= Ilyicha, Kursk Oblast =

Rural locality in Kursk Oblast, Russia

Ilyicha Ильича
- Khutor
- Interactive map of Ilyicha
- Location of Ilyicha Ilyicha (Kursk Oblast)
- Coordinates: 51°48′51″N 35°51′17″E
- Country: Russia
- Federal subject: Kursk Oblast
- Administrative district: Oktyabrsky District
- SelsovietSelsoviet: Filippovsky

Population (2010 Census)
  - Total: 12
  - Estimate (2010): 12 (0%)

Municipal status
  - Municipal district: Oktyabrsky Municipal District
  - Rural settlement: Filippovsky Selsoviet Rural Settlement
- Time zone: UTC+3 (MSK)
- Postal code: 307215
- Dialing code: +7 47142
- OKTMO ID: 38628432111
- Website: philipovo.ru

Ilyicha (Russian: Ильича) is a rural locality (a khutor) in Filippovsky Selsoviet Rural Settlement, Oktyabrsky District, Kursk Oblast, Russia. Population: 12 (2010 census); 13 (2002 census);

== Geography ==
The khutor is located on the Sukhaya Rogozna River (a left tributary of the Rogozna in the Seym River basin), 82 km from the Russia–Ukraine border, 21 km north-west of Kursk, 18 km north-west of the district center – the urban-type settlement Pryamitsyno, 3 km from the selsoviet center – Alyabyeva.

Climate

Ilyicha has a warm-summer humid continental climate (Dfb in the Köppen climate classification).

== Transport ==
Ilyicha is located 15 km from the federal route M-2 Crimea Highway (a part of the European route E105), 18 km from the road of regional importance 38K-017 (Kursk – Lgov – Rylsk – border with Ukraine), 1 km from the road of intermunicipal significance 38H-073 (Dyakonovo – Starkovo – Sokolovka), 20 km from the nearest railway halt 433 km (railway line Lgov I — Kursk).

The rural locality is situated 30 km from Kursk Vostochny Airport, 138 km from Belgorod International Airport and 232 km from Voronezh Peter the Great Airport.
