= Filippova, Kursk Oblast =

Rural locality in Kursk Oblast, Russia

Filippova Филиппова
- Village
- Interactive map of Filippova
- Location of Filippova Filippova (Kursk Oblast)
- Coordinates: 51°50′29″N 35°48′10″E
- Country: Russia
- Federal subject: Kursk Oblast
- Administrative district: Oktyabrsky District
- SelsovietSelsoviet: Filippovsky

Population (2010 Census)
  - Total: 38
  - Estimate (2010): 38 (0%)

Municipal status
  - Municipal district: Oktyabrsky Municipal District
  - Rural settlement: Filippovsky Selsoviet Rural Settlement
- Time zone: UTC+3 (MSK)
- Postal code: 307215
- Dialing code: +7 47142
- OKTMO ID: 38628432121
- Website: philipovo.ru

Filippova (Russian: Филиппова) is a rural locality (Russian: деревня, lit. 'village') in Filippovsky Selsoviet Rural Settlement, Oktyabrsky District, Kursk Oblast, Russia. Population: 38 (2010 census); 66 (2002 census);

== Geography ==
The village is located on the Rogozna Brook (a right tributary of the Sukhaya Rogozna in the Seym River basin), 83 km from the Russia–Ukraine border, 26 km north-west of Kursk, 22 km north-west of the district center – the urban-type settlement Pryamitsyno, 1.5 km from the selsoviet center – Alyabyeva.

Climate

Filippova has a warm-summer humid continental climate (Dfb in the Köppen climate classification).

== Transport ==
Filippova is located 17 km from the federal route M-2 Crimea Highway (a part of the European route E105), 20 km from the road of regional importance 38K-017 (Kursk – Lgov – Rylsk – border with Ukraine), 2 km from the road of intermunicipal significance 38H-073 (Dyakonovo – Starkovo – Sokolovka), 21.5 km from the nearest railway halt 433 km (railway line Lgov I — Kursk).

The rural locality is situated 35 km from Kursk Vostochny Airport, 143 km from Belgorod International Airport and 236 km from Voronezh Peter the Great Airport.
