= Nikolskoye, Oktyabrsky District, Kursk Oblast =

Rural locality in Kursk Oblast, Russia

Nikolskoye Никольское
- Selo
- Interactive map of Nikolskoye
- Location of Nikolskoye Nikolskoye (Kursk Oblast)
- Coordinates: 51°50′18″N 35°42′53″E
- Country: Russia
- Federal subject: Kursk Oblast
- Administrative district: Oktyabrsky District
- SelsovietSelsoviet: Nikolsky

Population (2010 Census)
  - Total: 5
  - Estimate (2010): 5 (0%)

Municipal status
  - Municipal district: Oktyabrsky Municipal District
  - Rural settlement: Nikolsky Selsoviet Rural Settlement
- Time zone: UTC+3 (MSK)
- Postal code: 307200
- Dialing code: +7 47142
- OKTMO ID: 38628424136
- Website: nikolskii46.ru

Nikolskoye (Russian: Никольское) is a rural locality (Russian: село, lit. 'village') in Nikolsky Selsoviet Rural Settlement, Oktyabrsky District, Kursk Oblast, Russia. Population: 5 (2010 census); 10 (2002 census);

== Geography ==
The village is located on the Rogozna River (a right tributary of the Seym River), 79 km from the Russia–Ukraine border, 31 km north-west of Kursk, 25 km north-west of the district center – the urban-type settlement Pryamitsyno, 3 km from the selsoviet center – Stoyanova.

Climate

Nikolskoye has a warm-summer humid continental climate (Dfb in the Köppen climate classification).

== Transport ==
Nikolskoye is located 22.5 km from the federal route M-2 Crimea Highway (a part of the European route E105), 19 km from the road of regional importance 38K-017 (Kursk – Lgov – Rylsk – border with Ukraine), 6.5 km from the road of intermunicipal significance 38H-073 (Dyakonovo – Starkovo – Sokolovka), 3 km from the road 38H-077 (38N-073 – Stoyanova), 20.5 km from the nearest railway halt 433 km (railway line Lgov I — Kursk).

The rural locality is situated 40.5 km from Kursk Vostochny Airport, 144 km from Belgorod International Airport and 242 km from Voronezh Peter the Great Airport.
