= 1st Malaya Dolzhenkova =

Rural locality in Kursk Oblast, Russia

1st Malaya Dolzhenkova 1-я Малая Долженкова
- Village
- Interactive map of 1st Malaya Dolzhenkova
- Location of 1st Malaya Dolzhenkova 1st Malaya Dolzhenkova (Kursk Oblast)
- Coordinates: 51°45′05″N 35°50′49″E
- Country: Russia
- Federal subject: Kursk Oblast
- Administrative district: Oktyabrsky District
- SelsovietSelsoviet: Starkovsky

Population (2010 Census)
  - Total: 69
  - Estimate (2010): 69 (0%)

Municipal status
  - Municipal district: Oktyabrsky Municipal District
  - Rural settlement: Starkovsky Selsoviet Rural Settlement
- Time zone: UTC+3 (MSK)
- Postal code: 307200
- Dialing code: +7 47142
- OKTMO ID: 38628428146
- Website: starkovo46.ru

1st Malaya Dolzhenkova or Pervaya Malaya Dolzhenkova (Russian: 1-я Малая Долженкова, Первая Малая Долженкова) is a rural locality (Russian: деревня, lit. 'village') in Starkovsky Selsoviet Rural Settlement, Oktyabrsky District, Kursk Oblast, Russia. Population: 69 (2010 census); 83 (2002 census);

== Geography ==
The village is located on the Sukhaya Rogozna River (a left tributary of the Rogozna in the Seym River basin), 76 km from the Russia–Ukraine border, 19 km north-west of Kursk, 11 km north-west of the district center – the urban-type settlement Pryamitsyno, 1 km from the selsoviet center – Starkovo.

Climate

1st Malaya Dolzhenkova has a warm-summer humid continental climate (Dfb in the Köppen climate classification).

== Transport ==
1st Malaya Dolzhenkova is located 16.5 km from the federal route M-2 Crimea Highway (a part of the European route E105), 11 km from the road of regional importance 38K-017 (Kursk – Lgov – Rylsk – border with Ukraine), 1 km from the road of intermunicipal significance 38H-073 (Dyakonovo – Starkovo – Sokolovka), on the road 38H-076 (38N-073 – Volobuyevo), 13 km from the nearest railway halt 439 km (railway line Lgov I — Kursk).

The rural locality is situated 30 km from Kursk Vostochny Airport, 132 km from Belgorod International Airport and 233 km from Voronezh Peter the Great Airport.
