= Bykanovo, Oktyabrsky District, Kursk Oblast =

Rural locality in Kursk Oblast, Russia

Bykanovo Быканово
- Selo
- Interactive map of Bykanovo
- Location of Bykanovo Bykanovo (Kursk Oblast)
- Coordinates: 51°48′44″N 35°46′38″E
- Country: Russia
- Federal subject: Kursk Oblast
- Administrative district: Oktyabrsky District
- SelsovietSelsoviet: Nikolsky

Population (2010 Census)
  - Total: 39
  - Estimate (2010): 39 (0%)

Municipal status
  - Municipal district: Oktyabrsky Municipal District
  - Rural settlement: Nikolsky Selsoviet Rural Settlement
- Time zone: UTC+3 (MSK)
- Postal code: 307200
- Dialing code: +7 47142
- OKTMO ID: 38628424106
- Website: nikolskii46.ru

Bykanovo (Russian: Быканово) is a rural locality (Russian: село, lit. 'village') in Nikolsky Selsoviet Rural Settlement, Oktyabrsky District, Kursk Oblast, Russia. Population: 39 (2010 census); 50 (2002 census);

== Geography ==
The village is located on the Vilna River (a left tributary of the Rogozna in the Seym River basin), 79 km from the Russia–Ukraine border, 26 km north-west of Kursk, 20 km north-west of the district center – the urban-type settlement Pryamitsyno, 3 km from the selsoviet center – Stoyanova.

Climate

Bykanovo has a warm-summer humid continental climate (Dfb in the Köppen climate classification).

== Transport ==
Bykanovo is located 20 km from the federal route M-2 Crimea Highway (a part of the European route E105), 16.5 km from the road of regional importance 38K-017 (Kursk – Lgov – Rylsk – border with Ukraine), 2 km from the road of intermunicipal significance 38H-073 (Dyakonovo – Starkovo – Sokolovka), 1 km from the road 38H-077 (38N-073 – Stoyanova), 18 km from the nearest railway halt 433 km (railway line Lgov I — Kursk).

The rural locality is situated 35.5 km from Kursk Vostochny Airport, 140 km from Belgorod International Airport and 238 km from Voronezh Peter the Great Airport.
