= Shuklinka, Oktyabrsky District, Kursk Oblast =

Rural locality in Kursk Oblast, Russia

Shuklinka Шуклинка
- Village
- Interactive map of Shuklinka
- Location of Shuklinka Shuklinka (Kursk Oblast)
- Coordinates: 51°49′19″N 35°46′25″E
- Country: Russia
- Federal subject: Kursk Oblast
- Administrative district: Oktyabrsky District
- SelsovietSelsoviet: Nikolsky

Population (2010 Census)
  - Total: 13
  - Estimate (2010): 13 (0%)

Municipal status
  - Municipal district: Oktyabrsky Municipal District
  - Rural settlement: Nikolsky Selsoviet Rural Settlement
- Time zone: UTC+3 (MSK)
- Postal code: 307200
- Dialing code: +7 47142
- OKTMO ID: 38628424156
- Website: nikolskii46.ru

Shuklinka (Russian: Шуклинка) is a rural locality (Russian: деревня, lit. 'village') in Nikolsky Selsoviet Rural Settlement, Oktyabrsky District, Kursk Oblast, Russia. Population: 13 (2010 census); 35 (2002 census);

== Geography ==
The village is located on the Vilna River (a left tributary of the Rogozna in the Seym River basin), 79 km from the Russia–Ukraine border, 27 km north-west of Kursk, 20 km north-west of the district center – the urban-type settlement Pryamitsyno, 3 km from the selsoviet center – Stoyanova.

Climate

Shuklinka has a warm-summer humid continental climate (Dfb in the Köppen climate classification).

== Transport ==
Shuklinka is located 19.5 km from the federal route M-2 Crimea Highway (a part of the European route E105), 17 km from the road of regional importance 38K-017 (Kursk – Lgov – Rylsk – border with Ukraine), 2 km from the road of intermunicipal significance 38H-073 (Dyakonovo – Starkovo – Sokolovka), 19 km from the nearest railway halt 433 km (railway line Lgov I — Kursk).

The rural locality is situated 36 km from Kursk Vostochny Airport, 141 km from Belgorod International Airport and 238 km from Voronezh Peter the Great Airport.
