= Rozhkova, Kursk Oblast =

Rural locality in Kursk Oblast, Russia

Rozhkova Рожкова
- Village
- Interactive map of Rozhkova
- Location of Rozhkova Rozhkova (Kursk Oblast)
- Coordinates: 51°47′08″N 35°46′33″E
- Country: Russia
- Federal subject: Kursk Oblast
- Administrative district: Oktyabrsky District
- SelsovietSelsoviet: Nikolsky

Population (2010 Census)
  - Total: 31
  - Estimate (2010): 31 (0%)

Municipal status
  - Municipal district: Oktyabrsky Municipal District
  - Rural settlement: Nikolsky Selsoviet Rural Settlement
- Time zone: UTC+3 (MSK)
- Postal code: 307200
- Dialing code: +7 47142
- OKTMO ID: 38628424151
- Website: nikolskii46.ru

Rozhkova (Russian: Рожкова) is a rural locality (Russian: деревня, lit. 'village') in Nikolsky Selsoviet Rural Settlement, Oktyabrsky District, Kursk Oblast, Russia. Population: 31 (2010 census); 62 (2002 census);

== Geography ==
The village is located on the Rogozna River (a right tributary of the Seym River), 76 km from the Russia–Ukraine border, 25 km north-west of Kursk, 17 km north-west of the district center – the urban-type settlement Pryamitsyno, 4 km from the selsoviet center – Stoyanova.

Climate

Rozhkova has a warm-summer humid continental climate (Dfb in the Köppen climate classification).

== Transport ==
Rozhkova is located 21 km from the federal route M-2 Crimea Highway (a part of the European route E105), 13.5 km from the road of regional importance 38K-017 (Kursk – Lgov – Rylsk – border with Ukraine), 3 km from the road of intermunicipal significance 38H-073 (Dyakonovo – Starkovo – Sokolovka), 2 km from the road 38H-077 (38N-073 – Stoyanova), 15 km from the nearest railway halt 433 km (railway line Lgov I — Kursk).

The rural locality is situated 35 km from Kursk Vostochny Airport, 137 km from Belgorod International Airport and 238 km from Voronezh Peter the Great Airport.
