= Bolshoye Umrikhino =

Rural locality in Kursk Oblast, Russia

Bolshoye Umrikhino Большое Умрихино
- Village
- Interactive map of Bolshoye Umrikhino
- Location of Bolshoye Umrikhino Bolshoye Umrikhino (Kursk Oblast)
- Coordinates: 51°45′34″N 35°48′03″E
- Country: Russia
- Federal subject: Kursk Oblast
- Administrative district: Oktyabrsky District
- SelsovietSelsoviet: Starkovsky

Population (2010 Census)
  - Total: 26
  - Estimate (2010): 26 (0%)

Municipal status
  - Municipal district: Oktyabrsky Municipal District
  - Rural settlement: Starkovsky Selsoviet Rural Settlement
- Time zone: UTC+3 (MSK)
- Postal code: 307200
- Dialing code: +7 47142
- OKTMO ID: 38628428116
- Website: starkovo46.ru

Bolshoye Umrikhino (Russian: Большое Умрихино) is a rural locality (Russian: деревня, lit. 'village') in Starkovsky Selsoviet Rural Settlement, Oktyabrsky District, Kursk Oblast, Russia. Population: 26 (2010 census); 42 (2002 census);

== Geography ==
The village is located on the Rogozna River (a right tributary of the Seym River), 75 km from the Russia–Ukraine border, 23 km north-west of Kursk, 13 km north-west of the district center – the urban-type settlement Pryamitsyno, 4 km from the selsoviet center – Starkovo.

Climate

Bolshoye Umrikhino has a warm-summer humid continental climate (Dfb in the Köppen climate classification).

== Transport ==
Bolshoye Umrikhino is located 19.5 km from the federal route M-2 Crimea Highway (a part of the European route E105), 11 km from the road of regional importance 38K-017 (Kursk – Lgov – Rylsk – border with Ukraine), 3.5 km from the road of intermunicipal significance 38H-073 (Dyakonovo – Starkovo – Sokolovka), 0.5 km from the road 38H-076 (38N-073 – Volobuyevo), 13 km from the nearest railway halt 433 km (railway line Lgov I — Kursk).

The rural locality is situated 33 km from Kursk Vostochny Airport, 134 km from Belgorod International Airport and 236 km from Voronezh Peter the Great Airport.
