= Seymsky =

Rural locality in Kursk Oblast, Russia

Seymsky Сеймский
- Khutor
- Interactive map of Seymsky
- Location of Seymsky Seymsky (Kursk Oblast)
- Coordinates: 51°40′22″N 35°52′58″E
- Country: Russia
- Federal subject: Kursk Oblast
- Administrative district: Oktyabrsky District
- SelsovietSelsoviet: Dolzhenkovsky

Population (2010 Census)
  - Total: 103
  - Estimate (2010): 103 (0%)

Municipal status
  - Municipal district: Oktyabrsky Municipal District
  - Rural settlement: Dolzhenkovsky Selsoviet Rural Settlement
- Time zone: UTC+3 (MSK)
- Postal code: 307200
- Dialing code: +7 47142
- OKTMO ID: 38628408136
- Website: bolshedol.rkursk.ru

Seymsky (Russian: Сеймский) is a rural locality (a khutor) in Dolzhenkovsky Selsoviet Rural Settlement, Oktyabrsky District, Kursk Oblast, Russia. Population: 103 (2010 census); 61 (2002 census);

== Geography ==
The khutor is located on the Seym River (a left tributary of the Desna), 72 km from the Russia–Ukraine border, 17 km south-west of Kursk, 4 km north-west of the district center – the urban-type settlement Pryamitsyno, 4.5 km from the selsoviet center – Bolshoye Dolzhenkovo.

Streets

There is Sosnovaya Street and 54 houses.

Climate

Seymsky has a warm-summer humid continental climate (Dfb in the Köppen climate classification).

== Transport ==
Seymsky is located 12.5 km from the federal route M-2 Crimea Highway (a part of the European route E105), 2.5 km from the road of regional importance 38K-017 (Kursk – Lgov – Rylsk – border with Ukraine), on the road of intermunicipal significance 38H-073 (Dyakonovo – Starkovo – Sokolovka), 5 km from the nearest railway halt 439 km (railway line Lgov I — Kursk).

The rural locality is situated 29 km from Kursk Vostochny Airport, 123 km from Belgorod International Airport and 232 km from Voronezh Peter the Great Airport.
