= Bolshoye Gostevo =

Rural locality in Kursk Oblast, Russia

Bolshoye Gostevo Большое Гостево
- Village
- Interactive map of Bolshoye Gostevo
- Location of Bolshoye Gostevo Bolshoye Gostevo (Kursk Oblast)
- Coordinates: 51°48′38″N 35°50′20″E
- Country: Russia
- Federal subject: Kursk Oblast
- Administrative district: Oktyabrsky District
- SelsovietSelsoviet: Starkovsky

Population (2010 Census)
  - Total: 14
  - Estimate (2010): 14 (0%)

Municipal status
  - Municipal district: Oktyabrsky Municipal District
  - Rural settlement: Starkovsky Selsoviet Rural Settlement
- Time zone: UTC+3 (MSK)
- Postal code: 307200
- Dialing code: +7 47142
- OKTMO ID: 38628428111
- Website: starkovo46.ru

Bolshoye Gostevo (Russian: Большое Гостево) is a rural locality (Russian: деревня, lit. 'village') in Starkovsky Selsoviet Rural Settlement, Oktyabrsky District, Kursk Oblast, Russia. Population: 14 (2010 census); 24 (2002 census);

== Geography ==
The village is located on the Rogozna Brook (a right tributary of the Sukhaya Rogozna in the Seym River basin), 81 km from the Russia–Ukraine border, 22 km north-west of Kursk, 18 km north-west of the district center – the urban-type settlement Pryamitsyno, 5 km from the selsoviet center – Starkovo.

Climate

Bolshoye Gostevo has a warm-summer humid continental climate (Dfb in the Köppen climate classification).

== Transport ==
Bolshoye Gostevo is located 16 km from the federal route M-2 Crimea Highway (a part of the European route E105), 17 km from the road of regional importance 38K-017 (Kursk – Lgov – Rylsk – border with Ukraine), 2 km from the road of intermunicipal significance 38H-073 (Dyakonovo – Starkovo – Sokolovka), 19 km from the nearest railway halt 433 km (railway line Lgov I — Kursk).

The rural locality is situated 31.5 km from Kursk Vostochny Airport, 138 km from Belgorod International Airport and 233 km from Voronezh Peter the Great Airport.
