= Andrianovka, Oktyabrsky District, Kursk Oblast =

Rural locality in Kursk Oblast, Russia

Andrianovka Андриановка
- Village
- Interactive map of Andrianovka
- Location of Andrianovka Andrianovka (Kursk Oblast)
- Coordinates: 51°50′01″N 35°52′11″E
- Country: Russia
- Federal subject: Kursk Oblast
- Administrative district: Oktyabrsky District
- SelsovietSelsoviet: Filippovsky

Population (2010 Census)
  - Total: 16
  - Estimate (2010): 16 (0%)

Municipal status
  - Municipal district: Oktyabrsky Municipal District
  - Rural settlement: Filippovsky Selsoviet Rural Settlement
- Time zone: UTC+3 (MSK)
- Postal code: 307215
- Dialing code: +7 47142
- OKTMO ID: 38628432106
- Website: philipovo.ru

Andrianovka (Russian: Андриановка) is a rural locality (Russian: деревня, lit. 'village') in Filippovsky Selsoviet Rural Settlement, Oktyabrsky District, Kursk Oblast, Russia. Population: 16 (2010 census); 18 (2002 census);

== Geography ==
The village is located on the Sukhaya Rogozna River (a left tributary of the Rogozna in the Seym River basin), 85 kilometres (53 mi) from the Russia–Ukraine border, 21 kilometres (13 mi) north-west of Kursk, 19 kilometres (12 mi) northwest of the district center – the urban-type settlement Pryamitsyno, and 3 kilometres (2 mi) from the selsoviet center – Alyabyeva.

Climate

Andrianovka has a warm-summer humid continental climate (Dfb in the Köppen climate classification).

== Transport ==
Andrianovka is located 13 kilometres (8.1 mi) from the federal route M-2 Crimea Highway (a part of the European route E105), 20.5 kilometres (12.7 mi) from the road of regional importance 38K-017 (Kursk – Lgov – Rylsk – border with Ukraine), 0.5 kilometres (0.31 mi) from the road of intermunicipal significance 38H-073 (Dyakonovo – Starkovo – Sokolovka), and 21.5 kilometres (13.4 mi) from the nearest railway halt 439 km (railway line Lgov I — Kursk).

The rural locality is situated 30 kilometres (19 mi) from Kursk Vostochny Airport, 139 kilometres (86 mi) from Belgorod International Airport, and 231 kilometres (144 mi) from Voronezh Peter the Great Airport.
