= Perkova, Kursk Oblast =

Rural locality in Kursk Oblast, Russia

Perkova Перькова
- Village
- Interactive map of Perkova
- Location of Perkova Perkova (Kursk Oblast)
- Coordinates: 51°46′29″N 35°47′55″E
- Country: Russia
- Federal subject: Kursk Oblast
- Administrative district: Oktyabrsky District
- SelsovietSelsoviet: Starkovsky

Population (2010 Census)
  - Total: 24
  - Estimate (2010): 24 (0%)

Municipal status
  - Municipal district: Oktyabrsky Municipal District
  - Rural settlement: Starkovsky Selsoviet Rural Settlement
- Time zone: UTC+3 (MSK)
- Postal code: 307200
- Dialing code: +7 47142
- OKTMO ID: 38628428161
- Website: starkovo46.ru

Perkova (Russian: Перькова) is a rural locality (Russian: деревня, lit. 'village') in Starkovsky Selsoviet Rural Settlement, Oktyabrsky District, Kursk Oblast, Russia. Population: 24 (2010 census); 38 (2002 census);

== Geography ==
The village is located on the Rogozna River (a right tributary of the Seym River), 76 km from the Russia–Ukraine border, 23 km north-west of Kursk, 15 km north-west of the district center – the urban-type settlement Pryamitsyno, 4 km from the selsoviet center – Starkovo.

Climate

Perkova has a warm-summer humid continental climate (Dfb in the Köppen climate classification).

== Transport ==
Perkova is located 20 km from the federal route M-2 Crimea Highway (a part of the European route E105), 12.5 km from the road of regional importance 38K-017 (Kursk – Lgov – Rylsk – border with Ukraine), 2 km from the road of intermunicipal significance 38H-073 (Dyakonovo – Starkovo – Sokolovka), 14 km from the nearest railway halt 433 km (railway line Lgov I — Kursk).

The rural locality is situated 33.5 km from Kursk Vostochny Airport, 135 km from Belgorod International Airport and 236 km from Voronezh Peter the Great Airport.
