= Pyzhova, Kursk Oblast =

Rural locality in Kursk Oblast, Russia

Pyzhova Пыжова
- Village
- Interactive map of Pyzhova
- Location of Pyzhova Pyzhova (Kursk Oblast)
- Coordinates: 51°46′27″N 35°47′40″E
- Country: Russia
- Federal subject: Kursk Oblast
- Administrative district: Oktyabrsky District
- SelsovietSelsoviet: Starkovsky
- Elevation: 177 m (581 ft)

Population (2010 Census)
  - Total: 10
  - Estimate (2010): 10 (0%)

Municipal status
  - Municipal district: Oktyabrsky Municipal District
  - Rural settlement: Starkovsky Selsoviet Rural Settlement
- Time zone: UTC+3 (MSK)
- Postal code: 307200
- Dialing code: +7 47142
- OKTMO ID: 38628428171
- Website: starkovo46.ru

Pyzhova (Russian: Пыжова) is a rural locality (Russian: деревня, lit. 'village') in Starkovsky Selsoviet Rural Settlement, Oktyabrsky District, Kursk Oblast, Russia. Population: 10 (2010 census); 16 (2002 census);

== Geography ==
The village is located on the Rogozna River (a right tributary of the Seym River), 76 km from the Russia–Ukraine border, 24 km north-west of Kursk, 15 km north-west of the district center – the urban-type settlement Pryamitsyno, 4.5 km from the selsoviet center – Starkovo.

Climate

Pyzhova has a warm-summer humid continental climate (Dfb in the Köppen climate classification).

== Transport ==
Pyzhova is located 20.5 km from the federal route M-2 Crimea Highway (a part of the European route E105), 12.5 km from the road of regional importance 38K-017 (Kursk – Lgov – Rylsk – border with Ukraine), 2.5 km from the road of intermunicipal significance 38H-073 (Dyakonovo – Starkovo – Sokolovka), 14 km from the nearest railway halt 433 km (railway line Lgov I — Kursk).

The rural locality is situated 34 km from Kursk Vostochny Airport, 135 km from Belgorod International Airport and 237 km from Voronezh Peter the Great Airport.
