= 2nd Malaya Dolzhenkova =

Rural locality in Kursk Oblast, Russia

2nd Malaya Dolzhenkova 2-я Малая Долженкова
- Village
- Interactive map of 2nd Malaya Dolzhenkova
- Location of 2nd Malaya Dolzhenkova 2nd Malaya Dolzhenkova (Kursk Oblast)
- Coordinates: 51°44′32″N 35°50′31″E
- Country: Russia
- Federal subject: Kursk Oblast
- Administrative district: Oktyabrsky District
- SelsovietSelsoviet: Starkovsky

Population (2010 Census)
  - Total: 33
  - Estimate (2010): 33 (0%)

Municipal status
  - Municipal district: Oktyabrsky Municipal District
  - Rural settlement: Starkovsky Selsoviet Rural Settlement
- Time zone: UTC+3 (MSK)
- Postal code: 307200
- Dialing code: +7 47142
- OKTMO ID: 38628428151
- Website: starkovo46.ru

2nd Malaya Dolzhenkova or Vtoraya Malaya Dolzhenkova (Russian: 2-я Малая Долженкова, Вторая Малая Долженкова) is a rural locality (Russian: деревня, lit. 'village') in Starkovsky Selsoviet Rural Settlement, Oktyabrsky District, Kursk Oblast, Russia. Population: 33 (2010 census); 39 (2002 census);

== Geography ==
The village is located on the Sukhaya Rogozna River (a left tributary of the Rogozna in the Seym River basin), 75 km from the Russia–Ukraine border, 20 km west of Kursk, 10 km north-west of the district center – the urban-type settlement Pryamitsyno, 2 km from the selsoviet center – Starkovo.

Climate

2nd Malaya Dolzhenkova has a warm-summer humid continental climate (Dfb in the Köppen climate classification).

== Transport ==
2nd Malaya Dolzhenkova is located 16.5 km from the federal route M-2 Crimea Highway (a part of the European route E105), 9.5 km from the road of regional importance 38K-017 (Kursk – Lgov – Rylsk – border with Ukraine), 1 km from the road of intermunicipal significance 38H-073 (Dyakonovo – Starkovo – Sokolovka), 11.5 km from the nearest railway halt 439 km (railway line Lgov I — Kursk).

The rural locality is situated 31 km from Kursk Vostochny Airport, 131 km from Belgorod International Airport and 234 km from Voronezh Peter the Great Airport.
