= Pozdnyakova, Kursk Oblast =

Rural locality in Kursk Oblast, Russia

Pozdnyakova Позднякова
- Village
- Interactive map of Pozdnyakova
- Location of Pozdnyakova Pozdnyakova (Kursk Oblast)
- Coordinates: 51°50′30″N 35°42′20″E
- Country: Russia
- Federal subject: Kursk Oblast
- Administrative district: Oktyabrsky District
- SelsovietSelsoviet: Nikolsky

Population (2010 Census)
  - Total: 10
  - Estimate (2010): 10 (0%)

Municipal status
  - Municipal district: Oktyabrsky Municipal District
  - Rural settlement: Nikolsky Selsoviet Rural Settlement
- Time zone: UTC+3 (MSK)
- Postal code: 307200
- Dialing code: +7 47142
- OKTMO ID: 38628424141
- Website: nikolskii46.ru

Pozdnyakova (Russian: Позднякова) is a rural locality (Russian: деревня, lit. 'village') in Nikolsky Selsoviet Rural Settlement, Oktyabrsky District, Kursk Oblast, Russia. Population: 10 (2010 census); 21 (2002 census);

== Geography ==
The village is located on the Rogozna River (a right tributary of the Seym River), 79 km from the Russia–Ukraine border, 32 km north-west of Kursk, 26 km north-west of the district center – the urban-type settlement Pryamitsyno, 3.5 km from the selsoviet center – Stoyanova.

Climate

Pozdnyakova has a warm-summer humid continental climate (Dfb in the Köppen climate classification).

== Transport ==
Pozdnyakova is located 22.5 km from the federal route M-2 Crimea Highway (a part of the European route E105), 19.5 km from the road of regional importance 38K-017 (Kursk – Lgov – Rylsk – border with Ukraine), 7.5 km from the road of intermunicipal significance 38H-073 (Dyakonovo – Starkovo – Sokolovka), 3.5 km from the road 38H-077 (38N-073 – Stoyanova), 21 km from the nearest railway halt 433 km (railway line Lgov I — Kursk).

The rural locality is situated 41 km from Kursk Vostochny Airport, 145 km from Belgorod International Airport and 243 km from Voronezh Peter the Great Airport.
