= Kosinova, Kursk Oblast =

Rural locality in Kursk Oblast, Russia

Kosinova Косинова
- Village
- Interactive map of Kosinova
- Location of Kosinova Kosinova (Kursk Oblast)
- Coordinates: 51°49′07″N 35°44′07″E
- Country: Russia
- Federal subject: Kursk Oblast
- Administrative district: Oktyabrsky District
- SelsovietSelsoviet: Nikolsky
- Elevation: 207 m (679 ft)

Population (2010 Census)
  - Total: 31
  - Estimate (2010): 31 (0%)

Municipal status
  - Municipal district: Oktyabrsky Municipal District
  - Rural settlement: Nikolsky Selsoviet Rural Settlement
- Time zone: UTC+3 (MSK)
- Postal code: 307200
- Dialing code: +7 47142
- OKTMO ID: 38628424126
- Website: nikolskii46.ru

Kosinova (Russian: Косинова) is a rural locality (Russian: деревня, lit. 'village') in Nikolsky Selsoviet Rural Settlement, Oktyabrsky District, Kursk Oblast, Russia. Population: 31 (2010 census); 55 (2002 census);

== Geography ==
The village is located on the Rogozna River (a right tributary of the Seym River), 78 km from the Russia–Ukraine border, 29 km north-west of Kursk, 22 km north-west of the district center – the urban-type settlement Pryamitsyno, at the еаstern border of the selsoviet center – Stoyanova.

Climate

Kosinova has a warm-summer humid continental climate (Dfb in the Köppen climate classification).

== Transport ==
Kosinova is located, 22 km from the federal route M-2 Crimea Highway (a part of the European route E105), 17 km from the road of regional importance 38K-017 (Kursk – Lgov – Rylsk – border with Ukraine), 5 km from the road of intermunicipal significance 38H-073 (Dyakonovo – Starkovo – Sokolovka), on the road 38H-077 (38N-073 – Stoyanova), 18.5 km from the nearest railway halt 433 km (railway line Lgov I — Kursk).

The rural locality is situated 38.5 km from Kursk Vostochny Airport, 142 km from Belgorod International Airport and 241 km from Voronezh Peter the Great Airport.
