= Lozovskoye, Kursk Oblast =

Rural locality in Kursk Oblast, Russia

Lozovskoye Лозовское
- Selo
- Interactive map of Lozovskoye
- Location of Lozovskoye Lozovskoye (Kursk Oblast)
- Coordinates: 51°38′58″N 35°48′42″E
- Country: Russia
- Federal subject: Kursk Oblast
- Administrative district: Oktyabrsky District
- SelsovietSelsoviet: Katyrinsky

Population (2010 Census)
  - Total: 229
  - Estimate (2010): 229 (0%)

Municipal status
  - Municipal district: Oktyabrsky Municipal District
  - Rural settlement: Katyrinsky Selsoviet Rural Settlement
- Time zone: UTC+3 (MSK)
- Postal code: 307202
- Dialing code: +7 47142
- OKTMO ID: 38628416116
- Website: katirinss.ru

Lozovskoye (Russian: Лозовское) is a rural locality (Russian: село, lit. 'village') in Katyrinsky Selsoviet Rural Settlement, Oktyabrsky District, Kursk Oblast, Russia. Population: 229 (2010 census); 231 (2002 census);

== Geography ==
The village is located on the Seym River (a left tributary of the Desna), 66 km from the Russia–Ukraine border, 23 km south-west of Kursk, 7 km west of the district center – the urban-type settlement Pryamitsyno, at the western border of the selsoviet center – Mitrofanova.

Climate

Lozovskoye has a warm-summer humid continental climate (Dfb in the Köppen climate classification).

== Transport ==
Lozovskoye is located 17.5 km from the federal route M-2 Crimea Highway (a part of the European route E105), on the road of regional importance 38K-017 (Kursk – Lgov – Rylsk – border with Ukraine), 2 km from the nearest railway halt 439 km (railway line Lgov I — Kursk).

The rural locality is situated 34.5 km from Kursk Vostochny Airport, 123 km from Belgorod International Airport and 236 km from Voronezh Peter the Great Airport.
