= Semenikhina, Kursk Oblast =

Rural locality in Kursk Oblast, Russia

Semenikhina Семенихина
- Village
- Interactive map of Semenikhina
- Location of Semenikhina Semenikhina (Kursk Oblast)
- Coordinates: 51°38′35″N 35°52′14″E
- Country: Russia
- Federal subject: Kursk Oblast
- Administrative district: Oktyabrsky District
- SelsovietSelsoviet: Katyrinsky

Population (2010 Census)
  - Total: 132
  - Estimate (2010): 132 (0%)

Municipal status
  - Municipal district: Oktyabrsky Municipal District
  - Rural settlement: Katyrinsky Selsoviet Rural Settlement
- Time zone: UTC+3 (MSK)
- Postal code: 307202
- Dialing code: +7 47142
- OKTMO ID: 38628416141
- Website: katirinss.ru

Semenikhina (Russian: Семенихина) is a rural locality (Russian: деревня, lit. 'village') in Katyrinsky Selsoviet Rural Settlement, Oktyabrsky District, Kursk Oblast, Russia. Population: 132 (2010 census); 136 (2002 census);

== Geography ==
The village is located in the Seym River basin (a left tributary of the Desna), 69 km from the Russia–Ukraine border, 20 km south-west of Kursk, 3 km south-west of the district center – the urban-type settlement Pryamitsyno, 2 km from the selsoviet center – Mitrofanova.

Climate

Semenikhina has a warm-summer humid continental climate (Dfb in the Köppen climate classification).

== Transport ==
Semenikhina is located 13.5 km from the federal route M-2 Crimea Highway (a part of the European route E105), on the road of regional importance 38K-017 (Kursk – Lgov – Rylsk – border with Ukraine), 2 km from the nearest railway halt 439 km (railway line Lgov I — Kursk).

The rural locality is situated 31 km from Kursk Vostochny Airport, 120 km from Belgorod International Airport and 232 km from Voronezh Peter the Great Airport.
