= Sukhodolovka =

Rural locality in Kursk Oblast, Russia

Sukhodolovka Суходоловка
- Village
- Interactive map of Sukhodolovka
- Location of Sukhodolovka Sukhodolovka (Kursk Oblast)
- Coordinates: 51°38′50″N 35°52′57″E
- Country: Russia
- Federal subject: Kursk Oblast
- Administrative district: Oktyabrsky District
- SelsovietSelsoviet: Dyakonovsky

Population (2010 Census)
  - Total: 645
  - Estimate (2010): 645 (0%)

Municipal status
  - Municipal district: Oktyabrsky Municipal District
  - Rural settlement: Dyakonovsky Selsoviet Rural Settlement
- Time zone: UTC+3 (MSK)
- Postal code: 307200
- Dialing code: +7 47142
- OKTMO ID: 38628412121
- Website: djakonovo.rkursk.ru

Sukhodolovka (Russian: Суходоловка) is a rural locality (Russian: деревня, lit. 'village') in Dyakonovsky Selsoviet Rural Settlement, Oktyabrsky District, Kursk Oblast, Russia. Population: 645 (2010 census); 490 (2002 census);

== Geography ==
The village is located in the Seym River basin (a left tributary of the Desna), 70 km from the Russia–Ukraine border, 18 km south-west of Kursk, 1.5 km south-west of the district center – the urban-type settlement Pryamitsyno, at the northern border of the selsoviet center – Dyakonovo.

Climate

Sukhodolovka has a warm-summer humid continental climate (Dfb in the Köppen climate classification).

== Transport ==
Sukhodolovka is located 12 km from the federal route M-2 Crimea Highway (a part of the European route E105), on the roads of regional importance 38K-017 (Kursk – Lgov – Rylsk – border with Ukraine) and 38K-004 (Dyakonovo – Sudzha – border with Ukraine), 3 km from the nearest railway halt 439 km (railway line Lgov I — Kursk).

The rural locality is situated 26 km from Kursk Vostochny Airport, 120 km from Belgorod International Airport and 232 km from Voronezh Peter the Great Airport.
