= Adoyeva =

Rural locality in Kursk Oblast, Russia

Adoyeva Адоева
- Village
- Interactive map of Adoyeva
- Location of Adoyeva Adoyeva (Kursk Oblast)
- Coordinates: 51°36′54″N 35°54′42″E
- Country: Russia
- Federal subject: Kursk Oblast
- Administrative district: Oktyabrsky District
- SelsovietSelsoviet: Dyakonovsky

Population (2010 Census)
  - Total: 37
  - Estimate (2010): 37 (0%)

Municipal status
  - Municipal district: Oktyabrsky Municipal District
  - Rural settlement: Dyakonovsky Selsoviet Rural Settlement
- Time zone: UTC+3 (MSK)
- Postal code: 307213
- Dialing code: +7 47142
- OKTMO ID: 38628412106
- Website: djakonovo.rkursk.ru

Adoyeva (Russian: Адоева) is a rural locality (Russian: деревня, lit. 'village') in Dyakonovsky Selsoviet Rural Settlement, Oktyabrsky District, Kursk Oblast, Russia. Population: 37 (2010 census); 50 (2002 census);

== Geography ==
The village is located on the Vorobzha River (a left tributary of the Seym River), 69 km from the Russia–Ukraine border, 19 km south-west of Kursk, 4 km south-west of the district center – the urban-type settlement Pryamitsyno, 0.5 km from the selsoviet center – Dyakonovo.

Climate

Adoyeva has a warm-summer humid continental climate (Dfb in the Köppen climate classification).

== Transport ==
Adoyeva is located 4 km from the road of regional importance 38K-017 (Kursk – Lgov – Rylsk – border with Ukraine), 2.5 km from the road 38K-004 (Dyakonovo – Sudzha – border with Ukraine), 0.7 km from the road of intermunicipal significance 38H-078 (38K-004 – a part of a selo Dyakonovo: 4th Okolotok), 4.5 km from the nearest railway station Dyakonovo (railway line Lgov I — Kursk).

The rural locality is situated 30 km from Kursk Vostochny Airport, 117 km from Belgorod International Airport and 230 km from Voronezh Peter the Great Airport.
