= Repina, Kursk Oblast =

Rural locality in Kursk Oblast, Russia

Repina Репина
- Village
- Interactive map of Repina
- Location of Repina Repina (Kursk Oblast)
- Coordinates: 51°39′36″N 35°55′33″E
- Country: Russia
- Federal subject: Kursk Oblast
- Administrative district: Oktyabrsky District
- SelsovietSelsoviet: Chernitsynsky

Population (2010 Census)
  - Total: 469
  - Estimate (2010): 469 (0%)

Municipal status
  - Municipal district: Oktyabrsky Municipal District
  - Rural settlement: Chernitsynsky Selsoviet Rural Settlement
- Time zone: UTC+3 (MSK)
- Postal code: 307200
- Dialing code: +7 47142
- OKTMO ID: 38628436121
- Website: chernicino.ru

Repina (Russian: Репина) is a rural locality (Russian: деревня, lit. 'village') in Chernitsynsky Selsoviet Rural Settlement, Oktyabrsky District, Kursk Oblast, Russia. Population: 469 (2010 census); 506 (2002 census);

== Geography ==
The village is located on the Seym River (a left tributary of the Desna), 73 km from the Russia–Ukraine border, 15 km south-west of Kursk, at the western border of the district center – the urban-type settlement Pryamitsyno, 3.5 km from the selsoviet center – Chernitsyno.

Streets

There are the following streets in the locality: Bazarnaya, Repina, Tikhaya and Vishnyovaya (183 houses).

Climate

Repina has a warm-summer humid continental climate (Dfb in the Köppen climate classification).

== Transport ==
Repina is located 9.5 km from the federal route M-2 Crimea Highway (a part of the European route E105), on the road of regional importance 38K-017 (Kursk – Lgov – Rylsk – border with Ukraine), 2.5 km from the nearest railway station Dyakonovo (railway line Lgov I — Kursk).

The rural locality is situated 27 km from Kursk Vostochny Airport, 121 km from Belgorod International Airport and 228 km from Voronezh Peter the Great Airport.
