= Nizhnyaya Malykhina =

Rural locality in Kursk Oblast, Russia

Nizhnyaya Malykhina Нижняя Малыхина
- Village
- Interactive map of Nizhnyaya Malykhina
- Location of Nizhnyaya Malykhina Nizhnyaya Malykhina (Kursk Oblast)
- Coordinates: 51°40′04″N 35°46′57″E
- Country: Russia
- Federal subject: Kursk Oblast
- Administrative district: Oktyabrsky District
- SelsovietSelsoviet: Katyrinsky

Population (2010 Census)
  - Total: 85
  - Estimate (2010): 85 (0%)

Municipal status
  - Municipal district: Oktyabrsky Municipal District
  - Rural settlement: Katyrinsky Selsoviet Rural Settlement
- Time zone: UTC+3 (MSK)
- Postal code: 307202
- Dialing code: +7 47142
- OKTMO ID: 38628416126
- Website: katirinss.ru

Nizhnyaya Malykhina (Russian: Нижняя Малыхина) is a rural locality (Russian: деревня, lit. 'village') in Katyrinsky Selsoviet Rural Settlement, Oktyabrsky District, Kursk Oblast, Russia. Population: 85 (2010 census); 87 (2002 census);

== Geography ==
The village is located on the Seym River (a left tributary of the Desna), 66 km from the Russia–Ukraine border, 24 km south-west of Kursk, 9 km west of the district center – the urban-type settlement Pryamitsyno, 3.5 km from the selsoviet center – Mitrofanova.

Climate

Nizhnyaya Malykhina has a warm-summer humid continental climate (Dfb in the Köppen climate classification).

== Transport ==
Nizhnyaya Malykhina is located 19 km from the federal route M-2 Crimea Highway (a part of the European route E105), on the road of regional importance 38K-017 (Kursk – Lgov – Rylsk – border with Ukraine), 3.5 km from the nearest railway halt 433 km (railway line Lgov I — Kursk).

The rural locality is situated 36 km from Kursk Vostochny Airport, 125 km from Belgorod International Airport and 239 km from Voronezh Peter the Great Airport.
