= Reutova, Kursk Oblast =

Rural locality in Kursk Oblast, Russia

Reutova Реутова
- Village
- Interactive map of Reutova
- Location of Reutova Reutova (Kursk Oblast)
- Coordinates: 51°38′22″N 35°51′44″E
- Country: Russia
- Federal subject: Kursk Oblast
- Administrative district: Oktyabrsky District
- SelsovietSelsoviet: Katyrinsky

Population (2010 Census)
  - Total: 76
  - Estimate (2010): 76 (0%)

Municipal status
  - Municipal district: Oktyabrsky Municipal District
  - Rural settlement: Katyrinsky Selsoviet Rural Settlement
- Time zone: UTC+3 (MSK)
- Postal code: 307202
- Dialing code: +7 47142
- OKTMO ID: 38628416136
- Website: katirinss.ru

Reutova (Russian: Реутова) is a rural locality (Russian: деревня, lit. 'village') in Katyrinsky Selsoviet Rural Settlement, Oktyabrsky District, Kursk Oblast, Russia. Population: 76 (2010 census); 66 (2002 census);

== Geography ==
The village is located in the Seym River basin (a left tributary of the Desna), 68 km from the Russia–Ukraine border, 20 km south-west of Kursk, 4 km south-west of the district center – the urban-type settlement Pryamitsyno, 2 km from the selsoviet center – Mitrofanova.

Climate

Reutova has a warm-summer humid continental climate (Dfb in the Köppen climate classification).

== Transport ==
Reutova is located 14 km from the federal route M-2 Crimea Highway (a part of the European route E105), on the road of regional importance 38K-017 (Kursk – Lgov – Rylsk – border with Ukraine), 1.5 km from the nearest railway halt 439 km (railway line Lgov I — Kursk).

The rural locality is situated 31.5 km from Kursk Vostochny Airport, 120 km from Belgorod International Airport and 233 km from Voronezh Peter the Great Airport.
