= Korablyova, Kursk Oblast =

Rural locality in Kursk Oblast, Russia

Korablyova Кораблёва
- Village
- Interactive map of Korablyova
- Location of Korablyova Korablyova (Kursk Oblast)
- Coordinates: 51°38′19″N 35°50′20″E
- Country: Russia
- Federal subject: Kursk Oblast
- Administrative district: Oktyabrsky District
- SelsovietSelsoviet: Katyrinsky
- Elevation: 158 m (518 ft)

Population (2010 Census)
  - Total: 109
  - Estimate (2010): 109 (0%)

Municipal status
  - Municipal district: Oktyabrsky Municipal District
  - Rural settlement: Katyrinsky Selsoviet Rural Settlement
- Time zone: UTC+3 (MSK)
- Postal code: 307202
- Dialing code: +7 47142
- OKTMO ID: 38628416111
- Website: katirinss.ru

Korablyova (Russian: Кораблёва) is a rural locality (Russian: деревня, lit. 'village') in Katyrinsky Selsoviet Rural Settlement, Oktyabrsky District, Kursk Oblast, Russia. Population: 109 (2010 census); 104 (2002 census);

== Geography ==
The village is located in the Seym River basin (a left tributary of the Desna), 67 km from the Russia–Ukraine border, 21 km south-west of Kursk, 5 km west of the district center – the urban-type settlement Pryamitsyno, at the еаstern border of the selsoviet center – Mitrofanova.

Climate

Korablyova has a warm-summer humid continental climate (Dfb in the Köppen climate classification).

== Transport ==
Korablyova is located 15.5 km from the federal route M-2 Crimea Highway (a part of the European route E105), on the road of regional importance 38K-017 (Kursk – Lgov – Rylsk – border with Ukraine), in the vicinity of the railway halt 439 km (railway line Lgov I — Kursk).

The rural locality is situated 33 km from Kursk Vostochny Airport, 120 km from Belgorod International Airport and 235 km from Voronezh Peter the Great Airport.
