= Katyrina =

Rural locality in Kursk Oblast, Russia

Katyrina Катырина
- Village
- Interactive map of Katyrina
- Location of Katyrina Katyrina (Kursk Oblast)
- Coordinates: 51°39′36″N 35°47′24″E
- Country: Russia
- Federal subject: Kursk Oblast
- Administrative district: Oktyabrsky District
- SelsovietSelsoviet: Katyrinsky

Population (2010 Census)
  - Total: 160
  - Estimate (2010): 160 (0%)

Municipal status
  - Municipal district: Oktyabrsky Municipal District
  - Rural settlement: Katyrinsky Selsoviet Rural Settlement
- Time zone: UTC+3 (MSK)
- Postal code: 307202
- Dialing code: +7 47142
- OKTMO ID: 38628416106
- Website: katirinss.ru

Katyrina (Russian: Катырина) is a rural locality (Russian: деревня, lit. 'village') in Katyrinsky Selsoviet Rural Settlement, Oktyabrsky District, Kursk Oblast, Russia. Population: 160 (2010 census); 195 (2002 census);

== Geography ==
The village is located on the Seym River (a left tributary of the Desna), 66 km from the Russia–Ukraine border, 24 km south-west of Kursk, 8 km west of the district center – the urban-type settlement Pryamitsyno, 2 km from the selsoviet center – Mitrofanova.

Climate

Katyrina has a warm-summer humid continental climate (Dfb in the Köppen climate classification).

== Transport ==
Katyrina is located 18.5 km from the federal route M-2 Crimea Highway (a part of the European route E105), on the road of regional importance 38K-017 (Kursk – Lgov – Rylsk – border with Ukraine), 2.5 km from the nearest railway halt 433 km (railway line Lgov I — Kursk).

The rural locality is situated 35 km from Kursk Vostochny Airport, 124 km from Belgorod International Airport and 238 km from Voronezh Peter the Great Airport.
