= Anakhina, Kursk Oblast =

Rural locality in Kursk Oblast, Russia

Anakhina Анахина
- Village
- Interactive map of Anakhina
- Location of Anakhina Anakhina (Kursk Oblast)
- Coordinates: 51°39′10″N 36°00′15″E
- Country: Russia
- Federal subject: Kursk Oblast
- Administrative district: Oktyabrsky District
- SelsovietSelsoviet: Chernitsynsky

Population (2010 Census)
  - Total: 1,289
  - Estimate (2010): 1,289 (0%)

Municipal status
  - Municipal district: Oktyabrsky Municipal District
  - Rural settlement: Chernitsynsky Selsoviet Rural Settlement
- Time zone: UTC+3 (MSK)
- Postal code: 307207
- Dialing code: +7 47142
- OKTMO ID: 38628436106
- Website: chernicino.ru

Anakhina (Russian: Анахина) is a rural locality (Russian: деревня, lit. 'village') in Chernitsynsky Selsoviet Rural Settlement, Oktyabrsky District, Kursk Oblast, Russia. Population: 1,289 (2010 census); 3,028 (2002 census);

== Geography ==
The village is located on the Seym River (a left tributary of the Desna), 76 km from the Russia–Ukraine border, 11 km south-west of Kursk, 2 km east of the district center – the urban-type settlement Pryamitsyno, at the eastern border of the selsoviet center – Chernitsyno.

Streets

There are the following streets in the locality: Druzhby, Internatsionalnaya, Narodnaya, Prigorodnaya, Priseymskaya, Shkolnaya, Shkolny pereulok, Solnechnaya, Stepnaya, Yunosti, Yuzhny pereulok, Vostochnaya, Zheleznodorozhnaya and Zelyonaya (510 houses).

Climate

Anakhina has a warm-summer humid continental climate (Dfb in the Köppen climate classification).

Climate data for Anakhina
Month	Jan	Feb	Mar	Apr	May	Jun	Jul	Aug	Sep	Oct	Nov	Dec	Year
Mean daily maximum °C (°F)	−4.2 (24.4)	−3.2 (26.2)	2.7 (36.9)	13 (55)	19.4 (66.9)	22.7 (72.9)	25.3 (77.5)	24.7 (76.5)	18.2 (64.8)	10.5 (50.9)	3.3 (37.9)	−1.2 (29.8)	10.9 (51.6)
Daily mean °C (°F)	−6.2 (20.8)	−5.7 (21.7)	−0.8 (30.6)	8.2 (46.8)	14.8 (58.6)	18.4 (65.1)	21 (70)	20.1 (68.2)	14 (57)	7.3 (45.1)	1.1 (34.0)	−3.2 (26.2)	7.4 (45.3)
Mean daily minimum °C (°F)	−8.7 (16.3)	−8.8 (16.2)	−4.9 (23.2)	2.7 (36.9)	9.1 (48.4)	13.1 (55.6)	15.9 (60.6)	14.9 (58.8)	9.8 (49.6)	3.9 (39.0)	−1.2 (29.8)	−5.4 (22.3)	3.4 (38.1)
Average precipitation mm (inches)	51 (2.0)	45 (1.8)	47 (1.9)	50 (2.0)	62 (2.4)	71 (2.8)	73 (2.9)	55 (2.2)	59 (2.3)	59 (2.3)	47 (1.9)	49 (1.9)	668 (26.4)
Source: https://en.climate-data.org/asia/russian-federation/kursk-oblast/анахина-500167/

== Transport ==
Anakhina is located 3.5 km from the federal route M-2 Crimea Highway (a part of the European route E105), on the road of regional importance 38K-017 (Kursk – Lgov – Rylsk – border with Ukraine), 3 km from the nearest railway station Dyakonovo (railway line Lgov I — Kursk).

The rural locality is situated 22 km from Kursk Vostochny Airport, 118 km from Belgorod International Airport and 223 km from Voronezh Peter the Great Airport.
