= Maslova, Kursk Oblast =

Rural locality in Kursk Oblast, Russia

Maslova Маслова
- Village
- Interactive map of Maslova
- Location of Maslova Maslova (Kursk Oblast)
- Coordinates: 51°39′35″N 35°57′57″E
- Country: Russia
- Federal subject: Kursk Oblast
- Administrative district: Oktyabrsky District
- SelsovietSelsoviet: Chernitsynsky

Population (2010 Census)
  - Total: 1,295
  - Estimate (2010): 1,295 (0%)

Municipal status
  - Municipal district: Oktyabrsky Municipal District
  - Rural settlement: Chernitsynsky Selsoviet Rural Settlement
- Time zone: UTC+3 (MSK)
- Postal code: 307200
- Dialing code: +7 47142
- OKTMO ID: 38628436111
- Website: chernicino.ru

Maslova (Russian: Маслова) is a rural locality (Russian: деревня, lit. 'village') in Chernitsynsky Selsoviet Rural Settlement, Oktyabrsky District, Kursk Oblast, Russia. Population: 1,295 (2010 census); 1,284 (2002 census);

== Geography ==
The village is located on the Seym River (a left tributary of the Desna), 74 km from the Russia–Ukraine border, 13 km south-west of Kursk, at the eastern border of the district center – the urban-type settlement Pryamitsyno and at the western border of the selsoviet center – Chernitsyno.

Streets

There are the following streets in the locality: Mezhevaya, Novo-Maslovo, Oktyabrskaya, Polevaya and Rechnaya (436 houses).

Climate

Maslova has a warm-summer humid continental climate (Dfb in the Köppen climate classification).

Climate data for Maslova
Month	Jan	Feb	Mar	Apr	May	Jun	Jul	Aug	Sep	Oct	Nov	Dec	Year
Mean daily maximum °C (°F)	−4.2 (24.4)	−3.2 (26.2)	2.7 (36.9)	13 (55)	19.4 (66.9)	22.7 (72.9)	25.3 (77.5)	24.7 (76.5)	18.2 (64.8)	10.5 (50.9)	3.3 (37.9)	−1.2 (29.8)	10.9 (51.6)
Daily mean °C (°F)	−6.2 (20.8)	−5.7 (21.7)	−0.8 (30.6)	8.2 (46.8)	14.8 (58.6)	18.4 (65.1)	21 (70)	20.1 (68.2)	14 (57)	7.3 (45.1)	1.1 (34.0)	−3.2 (26.2)	7.4 (45.3)
Mean daily minimum °C (°F)	−8.7 (16.3)	−8.8 (16.2)	−4.9 (23.2)	2.7 (36.9)	9.1 (48.4)	13.1 (55.6)	15.9 (60.6)	14.9 (58.8)	9.8 (49.6)	3.9 (39.0)	−1.2 (29.8)	−5.4 (22.3)	3.4 (38.1)
Average precipitation mm (inches)	51 (2.0)	45 (1.8)	47 (1.9)	50 (2.0)	62 (2.4)	71 (2.8)	73 (2.9)	55 (2.2)	59 (2.3)	59 (2.3)	47 (1.9)	49 (1.9)	668 (26.4)
Source: https://en.climate-data.org/asia/russian-federation/kursk-oblast/маслова-682018/

== Transport ==
Maslova is located 7 km from the federal route M-2 Crimea Highway (a part of the European route E105), on the road of regional importance 38K-017 (Kursk – Lgov – Rylsk – border with Ukraine), 0.8 km from the nearest railway station Dyakonovo (railway line Lgov I — Kursk).

The rural locality is situated 25 km from Kursk Vostochny Airport, 119 km from Belgorod International Airport and 226 km from Voronezh Peter the Great Airport.
