= Alyabyeva, Kursk Oblast =

Rural locality in Kursk Oblast, Russia

Alyabyeva Алябьева
- Village
- Interactive map of Alyabyeva
- Location of Alyabyeva Alyabyeva (Kursk Oblast)
- Coordinates: 51°50′08″N 35°49′25″E
- Country: Russia
- Federal subject: Kursk Oblast
- Administrative district: Oktyabrsky District
- SelsovietSelsoviet: Filippovsky
- Elevation: 205 m (673 ft)

Population (2010 Census)
  - Total: 126
  - Estimate (2010): 126 (0%)

Administrative status
  - Capital of: Filippovsky Selsoviet

Municipal status
  - Municipal district: Oktyabrsky Municipal District
  - Rural settlement: Filippovsky Selsoviet Rural Settlement
  - Capital of: Filippovsky Selsoviet Rural Settlement
- Time zone: UTC+3 (MSK)
- Postal code: 307215
- Dialing code: +7 47142
- OKTMO ID: 38628432101
- Website: philipovo.ru

Alyabyeva (Russian: Алябьева) is a rural locality (Russian: деревня, lit. 'village') and the administrative center of Filippovsky Selsoviet Rural Settlement, Oktyabrsky District, Kursk Oblast, Russia. Population: 126 (2010 census); 155 (2002 census);

== Geography ==
The village is located on the Rogozna Brook (a right tributary of the Sukhaya Rogozna in the Seym River basin), 83 km from the Russia–Ukraine border, 25 km north-west of Kursk, 20 km north-west of the district center – the urban-type settlement Pryamitsyno.

Climate

Alyabyeva has a warm-summer humid continental climate (Dfb in the Köppen climate classification).

Climate data for Alyabyeva
Month	Jan	Feb	Mar	Apr	May	Jun	Jul	Aug	Sep	Oct	Nov	Dec	Year
Mean daily maximum °C (°F)	−4.2 (24.4)	−3.3 (26.1)	2.5 (36.5)	12.8 (55.0)	19.1 (66.4)	22.4 (72.3)	25.1 (77.2)	24.4 (75.9)	18 (64)	10.4 (50.7)	3.2 (37.8)	−1.3 (29.7)	10.8 (51.3)
Daily mean °C (°F)	−6.3 (20.7)	−5.8 (21.6)	−1.1 (30.0)	8 (46)	14.5 (58.1)	18.1 (64.6)	20.7 (69.3)	19.8 (67.6)	13.8 (56.8)	7.1 (44.8)	1 (34)	−3.3 (26.1)	7.2 (45.0)
Mean daily minimum °C (°F)	−8.8 (16.2)	−8.9 (16.0)	−5.2 (22.6)	2.5 (36.5)	8.9 (48.0)	12.8 (55.0)	15.7 (60.3)	14.7 (58.5)	9.6 (49.3)	3.8 (38.8)	−1.3 (29.7)	−5.4 (22.3)	3.2 (37.8)
Average precipitation mm (inches)	52 (2.0)	45 (1.8)	48 (1.9)	51 (2.0)	63 (2.5)	72 (2.8)	75 (3.0)	56 (2.2)	59 (2.3)	59 (2.3)	48 (1.9)	49 (1.9)	677 (26.6)
Source: https://en.climate-data.org/asia/russian-federation/kursk-oblast/алябьева-682244/

== Transport ==
Alyabyeva is located 16 km from the federal route M-2 Crimea Highway (a part of the European route E105), 19.5 km from the road of regional importance 38K-017 (Kursk – Lgov – Rylsk – border with Ukraine), on the road of intermunicipal significance 38H-073 (Dyakonovo – Starkovo – Sokolovka), 21 km from the nearest railway halt 433 km (railway line Lgov I — Kursk).

The rural locality is situated 33 km from Kursk Vostochny Airport, 141 km from Belgorod International Airport and 234 km from Voronezh Peter the Great Airport.
