= Pozdnyakov =

Pozdnyakov (masculine, Russian: Поздняков) or Pozdnyakova (feminine, Russian: Поздняков), also transliterated as Pozdniakov, is a Russian surname. Notable people with the surname include:

- Anastasia Pozdniakova (born 1985), Russian diver
- Anatoly Pozdnyakov (died 2001), Russian general
- Boris Pozdnyakov (born 1962), Russian football player
- Irina Pozdnyakova (born 1953), Russian swimmer
- Konstantin Pozdniakov (born 1952), Russian linguist
- Stanislav Pozdnyakov (born 1973), Russian fencer and president of the Russian Olympic Commission
- Tatyana Pozdnyakova (born 1955), Ukrainian Soviet long-distance runner
- Vasily Pozdnyakov (1869–1921), Russian conscientious objector and author
- Vyacheslav Pozdnyakov (born 1978), Russian fencer

== See also ==
- Pozdnyakova, Irkutsk Oblast, a village in Irkutsk Oblast
- Pozdnyakova, Kursk Oblast, a village in Oktyabrsky District of Kursk Oblast
