= Kosinova =

Kosinova may refer to:

- Feminine form of the Russian surname Kosinov
- Kosinova, Kursk Oblast, a village in Oktyabrsky District of Kursk Oblast
- Karolína Kosinová (born 1998), a Czech ice hockey player
