= Andrianovka (disambiguation) =

Andrianovka (Russian: Андриановка), rural localities and rivers in Russia, may refer to:

Localities

- Andrianovka, Bashkortostan, a village
- Andrianovka, Kamchatka Krai, a village
- Andrianovka, Medvensky District, Kursk Oblast, a village
- Andrianovka, Oktyabrsky District, Kursk Oblast, a village
- Andrianovka, Nizhny Novgorod Oblast, a settlement
- Andrianovka, Ryazan Oblast, a village
- Andrianovka, Tambov Oblast, a village
- Andrianovka, Voronezh Oblast, a khutor

Rivers

- Andrianovka (Northern Dvina), a tributary of the Northern Dvina, Arkhangelsk Oblast
- Andrianovka (Kamchatka), a left tributary of the Kamchatka River, Kamchatka Krai

See also

- Andrianov
