= Yakshina =

Yakshina may refer to:

- Yakshina, Arkhangelsk Oblast, a rural locality in Plesetsky District, Arkhangelsk Oblast, Russia
- Yakshina, Kursk Oblast, a rural locality in Oktyabrsky District, Kursk Oblast, Russia
