= Maslov (disambiguation) =

Maslova is the feminine form of the surname Maslov

Maslova may also refer to:

- Maslova, Kursk Oblast, village in Russia
- Maslova Pristan, urban-type settlement in Belgorod Oblast, Russia
