= Kosinov =

Kosinov may refer to:

- Kosinov, Adygeya, rural locality (khutor) in Adygea, Russia
- Kosinov, Kursk Oblast, rural locality (khutor) in Kursk Oblast, Russia
- Košinov, village in Studnice (Chrudim District), Czech Republic
- Kosinov (surname)
