= Chernitsyno, Kursk Oblast =

Rural locality in Kursk Oblast, Russia

Chernitsyno Черницыно
- Selo
- Interactive map of Chernitsyno
- Location of Chernitsyno Chernitsyno (Kursk Oblast)
- Coordinates: 51°39′02″N 35°59′03″E
- Country: Russia
- Federal subject: Kursk Oblast
- Administrative district: Oktyabrsky District
- SelsovietSelsoviet: Chernitsynsky

Population (2010 Census)
  - Total: 3,046
  - Estimate (2021): 2,926 (−3.9%)

Administrative status
  - Capital of: Chernitsynsky Selsoviet

Municipal status
  - Municipal district: Oktyabrsky Municipal District
  - Rural settlement: Chernitsynsky Selsoviet Rural Settlement
  - Capital of: Chernitsynsky Selsoviet Rural Settlement
- Time zone: UTC+3 (MSK)
- Postal code: 307207
- Dialing code: +7 47142
- OKTMO ID: 38628436101
- Website: chernicino.ru

Chernitsyno (Russian: Черницыно) is a rural locality (Russian: село, lit. 'village') and the administrative center of Chernitsynsky Selsoviet Rural Settlement, Oktyabrsky District, Kursk Oblast, Russia. Population: 3,046 (2010 census); 3,028 (2002 census);

== Geography ==
The village is located on the Seym River (a left tributary of the Desna), 75 km from the Russia–Ukraine border, 11 km south-west of Kursk, at the еаstern border of the district center – the urban-type settlement Pryamitsyno.

Streets

There are the following streets in the locality: Burovaya, Geologicheskaya, Listyanka, Magistralnaya, Naberezhnaya, Nadezhdy, Oktyabrskaya, Oktyabrsky pereulok, Pushkarka, Sportivnaya, Svetlaya, Shirokaya, Tsentralnaya, Tsukanovka and Verkhnyaya Naberezhnaya (1039 houses).

Climate

Chernitsyno has a warm-summer humid continental climate (Dfb in the Köppen climate classification).

Climate data for Chernitsyno
Month	Jan	Feb	Mar	Apr	May	Jun	Jul	Aug	Sep	Oct	Nov	Dec	Year
Mean daily maximum °C (°F)	−4.2 (24.4)	−3.2 (26.2)	2.7 (36.9)	13 (55)	19.4 (66.9)	22.7 (72.9)	25.3 (77.5)	24.7 (76.5)	18.2 (64.8)	10.5 (50.9)	3.3 (37.9)	−1.2 (29.8)	10.9 (51.6)
Daily mean °C (°F)	−6.2 (20.8)	−5.7 (21.7)	−0.8 (30.6)	8.2 (46.8)	14.8 (58.6)	18.4 (65.1)	21 (70)	20.1 (68.2)	14 (57)	7.3 (45.1)	1.1 (34.0)	−3.2 (26.2)	7.4 (45.3)
Mean daily minimum °C (°F)	−8.7 (16.3)	−8.8 (16.2)	−4.9 (23.2)	2.7 (36.9)	9.1 (48.4)	13.1 (55.6)	15.9 (60.6)	14.9 (58.8)	9.8 (49.6)	3.9 (39.0)	−1.2 (29.8)	−5.4 (22.3)	3.4 (38.1)
Average precipitation mm (inches)	51 (2.0)	45 (1.8)	47 (1.9)	50 (2.0)	62 (2.4)	71 (2.8)	73 (2.9)	55 (2.2)	59 (2.3)	59 (2.3)	47 (1.9)	49 (1.9)	668 (26.4)
Source: https://en.climate-data.org/asia/russian-federation/kursk-oblast/черницыно-500168/

== Transport ==
Chernitsyno is located 5 km from the federal route M-2 Crimea Highway (a part of the European route E105), on the road of regional importance 38K-017 (Kursk – Lgov – Rylsk – border with Ukraine), on the road of intermunicipal significance 38H-551 (Pryamitsyno – Asphalt plant of Oktyabrsky District – Chernitsyno), 1.5 km from the nearest railway station Dyakonovo (railway line Lgov I — Kursk).

The rural locality is situated 23 km from Kursk Vostochny Airport, 118 km from Belgorod International Airport and 225 km from Voronezh Peter the Great Airport.
