= Yakshina, Arkhangelsk Oblast =

Yakshina Якшина
- Village
- Location within Arkhangelsk Oblast Location within Russia
- Coordinates: 62°48′N 41°09′E
- Country: Russia
- Region: Arkhangelsk Oblast
- District: Plesetsky District
- Time zone: UTC+3:00

Yakshina (Russian: Якшина) is a rural locality (a village) in Plesetsky District, Arkhangelsk Oblast, Russia. The population was 18 as of 2010.

== Geography ==
Yakshina is located on the Puksa River, 114 km east of Plesetsk (the district's administrative centre) by road. Yurmala is the nearest rural locality.
