= Vasily Pozdnyakov =

Vasily Nikolaevich Pozdnyakov
- Born: 1869; Bogdanovka (now Ninotsminda), Georgia
- Died: 1921 (aged 51–52)
- Occupations: Peasant; conscientious objector; author.
- Known for: Writing a report on the treatment of the Doukhobor conscientious objectors in Russian Empire, and a number of other works on Doukhobor life and history

Vasily Nikolaevich Pozdnyakov (Russian: Василий Николаевич Поздняков) (1869–1921) was one of the members of the Russian Doukhobor community who in 1895 declared themselves conscientious objectors. Severely punished and exiled to Yakutia, he escaped and wrote an important account of his and his comrades' story, published internationally. He also authored a number of articles about the Doukhobor life in Russian Empire and Canada.

== Biography ==
Vasily Pozdnyakov originated from a Doukhobor family from the village of Bogdanovka (now Ninotsminda), in the south of Georgia. His ancestors, along with other Doukhobors, had been exiled to Georgia during the reign of Nicholas I.

Although the Doukhobor religion and world view had traditionally espoused non-violence, the dangerous conditions of life in the southern borderlands of Russian Empire and the necessity to co-operate with the authorities resulted in the Doukhobors of the mid- and late-19th century owning and using weapons for self-defence, and, when conscripted, joining the Russian military. However, as a moral and religious revival, inspired by the exiled community leader Peter Vasilevich Verigin and by Leo Tolstoy's philosophy of non-violence, by 1895 many of the Doukhobors living in Transcaucasia resolved to destroy the weapons they owned. Those of them who had already served in the military returned their reservist registration cards to the authorities, meanwhile the young Doukhobor conscripts currently in the army returned their weapons to their commanders and refused further service.

The punishment was swift, both for the civilians and the conscripts. Vasily Pozdnyakov, who was a reservist at the time of his protest, had 300 lashes, and after 20 days in jail was called up once again to do his military service. As he again refused to bear arms, he spent some time in prison, which was to be followed by a 13-year exile to Yakutia. His party of convicts left the Tiflis prison to Siberia around Easter 1897, but only reached as far as Irkutsk by the time winter fell. Having wintered in the Irkutsk prison, the survivors of the Pozdnyakov's party continued down the Lena River next spring, and eventually arrived to the place where other Doukhobors — those who had refused further service while already conscripted — had been exiled earlier. The location, known as Ust'-Notora (Russian: Усть-Нотора), where the Notora River flows into the Aldan River, was particularly remote and desolate even for Yakutia.

In autumn 1898 Pozdnyakov was chosen by his exile comrades to secretly leave and visit their spiritual leader, Peter Vasilevich Verigin, then in exile elsewhere in Siberia, and then their friends and family back in Transcaucasia. He managed to accomplish: crossing Siberia to meet Verigin in Obdorsk (disguised as a fishmonger, as no Doukhobor visitors were allowed to see Verigin); spending four days at Leo Tolstoy's at Yasnaya Polyana; spending a fortnight in the Transcaucasia, reporting to the exiles' wives on the situation in Yakutia and inviting them to join their husbands (which many of them did some time later); and returning to his place of exile in Yakutia. On the way, he delivered Verigin's letters to Tolstoy and to the Doukhbors in the Transcaucasia, and back from the Caucasus to the exiles in Yakutia.

Tolstoy described him in a letter to Vladimir Chertkov as "one of those people who are afraid of nothing".

Shortly before Pozdnyakov's visit to Tolstoy, Tolstoy had been asked by Vladimir Bonch-Bruevich, then in England, to provide him with more information on the persecution of the Doukhobors, for use in articles Bonch-Bruevich was publishing. Tolstoy's papers for this period to contain a list of questions that he (Tolstoy) was to ask his Doukhobor's visitor. In the opinion of a modern researcher, O.A. Golinenko, these Tolstoy's question list may have been compiled in response to Bonch-Bruevich letter, as a checklist for Tolstoy to collect the information from his Doukhobor visitor.

In 1901 a small book entitled "The tale of Doukhobor Vasya Pozdnyakov. With an Appendix including documents about beatings and rapes of Doukhobor women by the Cossacks" («Рассказ духобора Васи Позднякова. С приложением документов об избиении и изнасиловании духоборческих женщин казаками») was published in London by Vladimir Chertkov's Svobodnoye Slovo (The Free Word) Publishers. The editor and the author of the preface was Vladimir Bonch-Bruevich, the scholar who had requested the information from Tolstoy, and the author's text was dated 1898.

Once many of Doukhobor exiles' wives arrived to Ust'-Notora to join them, some of the Doukhobors relocated to a new village named Otradnoye (Russian: Отрадное, 'place of rejoicing'). After religious tolerance was declared by October Manifesto in 1905, Pozdnyakov, and the other exiles were able to abandon their Yakutia village and come to Canada.

After arrival to Saskatchewan, he, and some other survivors of the Yakutia exile, found the state of the affairs in the Doukhbor community there, in particular Verigin dictatorial leadership, quite a mismatch to those prospects of "radiant future" about which he was hearing from Veriging in 1898. His disillusionment shows in his Canadian essays, such as "Story of a Spiritual Upheaval" (1908). He later left the Doukhobor community.

In 1914 a number of Pozdnyakov's essays - on the life of the Doukhobors in Transcaucasia, in Siberian exile, and in Canada - appeared in The Monthly of Literary, Science, and Social Life («Ежемесячный журнал литературы, науки и общественной жизни»); one of them recounts his 1898 visit to Tolstoy, and carries Chertkov's comment that it was during those four days in 1898 that Pozdnyakov's Tale was written.

== Pozdnyakov's works available online ==
- Story of a Spiritual Upheaval (Swarthmore, Pennsylvania, 1908). (Doukhobor Heritage website) (in English)

== See also ==
- List of peace activists
