= Kosinov (surname) =

Kosinov (Russian: Косинов, feminine: Kosinova) is a Russian surname. Notable people with the surname include:

- Artem Kossinov (born 1986), Kazakhstani runner
- Mariya Kosinova (born 1984), Russian biathlete
- Olexandr Kosinov (born 1983), Ukrainian Paralympic judoka
- Oleksandr Kosinov (film director) (1936–2005), Ukrainian film director

== See also ==
- Kosinova (disambiguation)
