= Mitrofanova, Kursk Oblast =

Rural locality in Kursk Oblast, Russia

Mitrofanova Митрофанова
- Village
- Interactive map of Mitrofanova
- Location of Mitrofanova Mitrofanova (Kursk Oblast)
- Coordinates: 51°38′35″N 35°49′28″E
- Country: Russia
- Federal subject: Kursk Oblast
- Administrative district: Oktyabrsky District
- SelsovietSelsoviet: Katyrinsky

Population (2010 Census)
  - Total: 309
  - Estimate (2010): 309 (0%)

Administrative status
  - Capital of: Katyrinsky Selsoviet

Municipal status
  - Municipal district: Oktyabrsky Municipal District
  - Rural settlement: Katyrinsky Selsoviet Rural Settlement
  - Capital of: Katyrinsky Selsoviet Rural Settlement
- Time zone: UTC+3 (MSK)
- Postal code: 307202
- Dialing code: +7 47142
- OKTMO ID: 38628416101
- Website: katirinss.ru

Mitrofanova (Russian: Митрофанова) is a rural locality (Russian: деревня, lit. 'village') and the administrative center of Katyrinsky Selsoviet Rural Settlement, Oktyabrsky District, Kursk Oblast, Russia. Population: 309 (2010 census); 317 (2002 census);

== Geography ==
The village is located in the Seym River basin (a left tributary of the Desna), 67 km from the Russia–Ukraine border, 22 km south-west of Kursk, 6 km west of the district center – the urban-type settlement Pryamitsyno.

Climate

Mitrofanova has a warm-summer humid continental climate (Dfb in the Köppen climate classification).

== Transport ==
Mitrofanova is located 16.5 km from the federal route M-2 Crimea Highway (a part of the European route E105), on the road of regional importance 38K-017 (Kursk – Lgov – Rylsk – border with Ukraine), 0.5 km from the nearest railway halt 439 km (railway line Lgov I — Kursk).

The rural locality is situated 33 km from Kursk Vostochny Airport, 121 km from Belgorod International Airport and 235 km from Voronezh Peter the Great Airport.
