= Stoyanova, Kursk Oblast =

Rural locality in Kursk Oblast, Russia

Stoyanova Стоянова
- Village
- Interactive map of Stoyanova
- Location of Stoyanova Stoyanova (Kursk Oblast)
- Coordinates: 51°49′00″N 35°43′46″E
- Country: Russia
- Federal subject: Kursk Oblast
- Administrative district: Oktyabrsky District
- SelsovietSelsoviet: Nikolsky

Population (2010 Census)
  - Total: 64
  - Estimate (2010): 64 (0%)

Administrative status
  - Capital of: Nikolsky Selsoviet

Municipal status
  - Municipal district: Oktyabrsky Municipal District
  - Rural settlement: Nikolsky Selsoviet Rural Settlement
  - Capital of: Nikolsky Selsoviet Rural Settlement
- Time zone: UTC+3 (MSK)
- Postal code: 307217
- Dialing code: +7 47142
- OKTMO ID: 38628424101
- Website: nikolskii46.ru

Stoyanova (Russian: Стоянова) is a rural locality (Russian: деревня, lit. 'village') and the administrative center of Nikolsky Selsoviet Rural Settlement, Oktyabrsky District, Kursk Oblast, Russia. Population: 64 (2010 census); 88 (2002 census);

== Geography ==
The village is located on the Rogozna River (a right tributary of the Seym River), 77 km from the Russia–Ukraine border, 29 km north-west of Kursk, 21 km north-west of the district center – the urban-type settlement Pryamitsyno.

Climate

Stoyanova has a warm-summer humid continental climate (Dfb in the Köppen climate classification).

== Transport ==
Stoyanova is located 22 km from the federal route M-2 Crimea Highway (a part of the European route E105), 16.5 km from the road of regional importance 38K-017 (Kursk – Lgov – Rylsk – border with Ukraine), 5 km from the road of intermunicipal significance 38H-073 (Dyakonovo – Starkovo – Sokolovka), on the road 38H-077 (38N-073 – Stoyanova), 18 km from the nearest railway halt 433 km (railway line Lgov I — Kursk).

The rural locality is situated 39 km from Kursk Vostochny Airport, 141 km from Belgorod International Airport and 241 km from Voronezh Peter the Great Airport.
