= Sokolovka, Oktyabrsky District, Kursk Oblast =

Rural locality in Kursk Oblast, Russia

Sokolovka Соколовка
- Village
- Interactive map of Sokolovka
- Location of Sokolovka Sokolovka (Kursk Oblast)
- Coordinates: 51°49′45″N 35°52′06″E
- Country: Russia
- Federal subject: Kursk Oblast
- Administrative district: Oktyabrsky District
- SelsovietSelsoviet: Filippovsky

Population (2010 Census)
  - Total: 33
  - Estimate (2010): 33 (0%)

Municipal status
  - Municipal district: Oktyabrsky Municipal District
  - Rural settlement: Filippovsky Selsoviet Rural Settlement
- Time zone: UTC+3 (MSK)
- Postal code: 307215
- Dialing code: +7 47142
- OKTMO ID: 38628432116
- Website: philipovo.ru

Sokolovka (Russian: Соколовка) is a rural locality (Russian: деревня, lit. 'village') in Filippovsky Selsoviet Rural Settlement, Oktyabrsky District, Kursk Oblast, Russia. Population: 33 (2010 census); 46 (2002 census);

== Geography ==
The village is located on the Sukhaya Rogozna River (a left tributary of the Rogozna in the Seym River basin), 84 km from the Russia–Ukraine border, 21 km north-west of Kursk, 19 km north-west of the district center – the urban-type settlement Pryamitsyno, 2.5 km from the selsoviet center – Alyabyeva.

Climate

Sokolovka has a warm-summer humid continental climate (Dfb in the Köppen climate classification).

== Transport ==
Sokolovka is located 13.5 km from the federal route M-2 Crimea Highway (a part of the European route E105), 19 km from the road of regional importance 38K-017 (Kursk – Lgov – Rylsk – border with Ukraine), on the road of intermunicipal significance 38H-073 (Dyakonovo – Starkovo – Sokolovka), 21 km from the nearest railway station Dyakonovo (railway line Lgov I — Kursk).

The rural locality is situated 30 km from Kursk Vostochny Airport, 139 km from Belgorod International Airport and 232 km from Voronezh Peter the Great Airport.
