= Starkovo, Kursk Oblast =

Rural locality in Kursk Oblast, Russia

Starkovo Старково
- Selo
- Interactive map of Starkovo
- Location of Starkovo Starkovo (Kursk Oblast)
- Coordinates: 51°45′19″N 35°51′52″E
- Country: Russia
- Federal subject: Kursk Oblast
- Administrative district: Oktyabrsky District
- SelsovietSelsoviet: Starkovsky

Population (2010 Census)
  - Total: 294
  - Estimate (2010): 294 (0%)

Administrative status
  - Capital of: Starkovsky Selsoviet

Municipal status
  - Municipal district: Oktyabrsky Municipal District
  - Rural settlement: Starkovsky Selsoviet Rural Settlement
  - Capital of: Starkovsky Selsoviet Rural Settlement
- Time zone: UTC+3 (MSK)
- Postal code: 307212
- Dialing code: +7 47142
- OKTMO ID: 38628428101
- Website: starkovo46.ru

Starkovo (Russian: Старково) is a rural locality (Russian: село, lit. 'village') and the administrative center of Starkovsky Selsoviet Rural Settlement, Oktyabrsky District, Kursk Oblast, Russia. Population: 294 (2010 census); 363 (2002 census);

== Geography ==
The village is located on the Sukhaya Rogozna River (a left tributary of the Rogozna in the Seym River basin), 78 km from the Russia–Ukraine border, 20 km west of Kursk, 11 km north-west of the district center – the urban-type settlement Pryamitsyno.

Climate

Starkovo has a warm-summer humid continental climate (Dfb in the Köppen climate classification).

Climate data for Starkovo
Month	Jan	Feb	Mar	Apr	May	Jun	Jul	Aug	Sep	Oct	Nov	Dec	Year
Mean daily maximum °C (°F)	−4.3 (24.3)	−3.3 (26.1)	2.5 (36.5)	12.8 (55.0)	19.2 (66.6)	22.4 (72.3)	25.1 (77.2)	24.4 (75.9)	18 (64)	10.4 (50.7)	3.2 (37.8)	−1.3 (29.7)	10.8 (51.3)
Daily mean °C (°F)	−6.3 (20.7)	−5.8 (21.6)	−1.1 (30.0)	8 (46)	14.5 (58.1)	18.2 (64.8)	20.8 (69.4)	19.8 (67.6)	13.8 (56.8)	7.1 (44.8)	1 (34)	−3.3 (26.1)	7.2 (45.0)
Mean daily minimum °C (°F)	−8.8 (16.2)	−8.9 (16.0)	−5.1 (22.8)	2.5 (36.5)	8.9 (48.0)	12.8 (55.0)	15.7 (60.3)	14.7 (58.5)	9.6 (49.3)	3.8 (38.8)	−1.3 (29.7)	−5.5 (22.1)	3.2 (37.8)
Average precipitation mm (inches)	52 (2.0)	45 (1.8)	48 (1.9)	51 (2.0)	63 (2.5)	72 (2.8)	75 (3.0)	56 (2.2)	59 (2.3)	59 (2.3)	48 (1.9)	49 (1.9)	677 (26.6)
Source: https://en.climate-data.org/asia/russian-federation/kursk-oblast/старково-319647/

== Transport ==
Starkovo is located 15.5 km from the federal route M-2 Crimea Highway (a part of the European route E105), 12 km from the road of regional importance 38K-017 (Kursk – Lgov – Rylsk – border with Ukraine), on the road of intermunicipal significance 38H-073 (Dyakonovo – Starkovo – Sokolovka), 13.5 km from the nearest railway station Dyakonovo (railway line Lgov I — Kursk).

The rural locality is situated 29 km from Kursk Vostochny Airport, 132 km from Belgorod International Airport and 232 km from Voronezh Peter the Great Airport.
