= Dyakonovo, Kursk Oblast =

Rural locality in Kursk Oblast, Russia

Dyakonovo Дьяконово
- Selo
- Interactive map of Dyakonovo
- Location of Dyakonovo Dyakonovo (Kursk Oblast)
- Coordinates: 51°38′56″N 35°53′56″E
- Country: Russia
- Federal subject: Kursk Oblast
- Administrative district: Oktyabrsky District
- SelsovietSelsoviet: Dyakonovsky

Population (2010 Census)
  - Total: 3,906
  - Estimate (2021): 4,322 (+10.7%)

Administrative status
  - Capital of: Dyakonovsky Selsoviet

Municipal status
  - Municipal district: Oktyabrsky Municipal District
  - Rural settlement: Dyakonovsky Selsoviet Rural Settlement
  - Capital of: Dyakonovsky Selsoviet Rural Settlement
- Time zone: UTC+3 (MSK)
- Postal codes: 307213, 307214
- Dialing code: +7 47142
- OKTMO ID: 38628412101
- Website: djakonovo.rkursk.ru

Dyakonovo (Russian: Дьяконово) is a rural locality (Russian: село, lit. 'village') and the administrative center of Dyakonovsky Selsoviet Rural Settlement, Oktyabrsky District, Kursk Oblast, Russia. Population: 4,322 (2021 census); 3,906 (2010 census); 4,125 (2002 census);

== Geography ==
The village is located on the Vorobzha River (a left tributary of the Seym River), 68 km from the Russia–Ukraine border, 17 km south-west of Kursk, 2 km west of the district center – the urban-type settlement Pryamitsyno.

Streets

There are the following streets in the locality: Gorodskaya, Komsomolskaya, Krasnoy Zvezdy, Lomakina, Lugovaya, Magistralnaya, Mirnaya, Molodyozhnaya, Parkovaya, Pervomayskaya, Pobedy, pereulok Pobedy, Polevaya, Sadovaya, Shkolnaya, Simonenko, Sovetskaya, Tsentralnaya, Zarechnaya and Zavodskaya (1542 houses).

Climate

Dyakonovo has a warm-summer humid continental climate (Dfb in the Köppen climate classification).

Climate data for Dyakonovo
Month	Jan	Feb	Mar	Apr	May	Jun	Jul	Aug	Sep	Oct	Nov	Dec	Year
Mean daily maximum °C (°F)	−4.1 (24.6)	−3.1 (26.4)	2.9 (37.2)	13.1 (55.6)	19.4 (66.9)	22.7 (72.9)	25.3 (77.5)	24.7 (76.5)	18.2 (64.8)	10.6 (51.1)	3.4 (38.1)	−1.2 (29.8)	11.0 (51.8)
Daily mean °C (°F)	−6.2 (20.8)	−5.6 (21.9)	−0.7 (30.7)	8.3 (46.9)	14.8 (58.6)	18.4 (65.1)	21 (70)	20.1 (68.2)	14 (57)	7.3 (45.1)	1.2 (34.2)	−3.1 (26.4)	7.5 (45.4)
Mean daily minimum °C (°F)	−8.7 (16.3)	−8.7 (16.3)	−4.8 (23.4)	2.8 (37.0)	9.2 (48.6)	13.1 (55.6)	15.9 (60.6)	15 (59)	9.8 (49.6)	4 (39)	−1.2 (29.8)	−5.3 (22.5)	3.4 (38.1)
Average precipitation mm (inches)	51 (2.0)	45 (1.8)	47 (1.9)	50 (2.0)	62 (2.4)	71 (2.8)	73 (2.9)	55 (2.2)	59 (2.3)	59 (2.3)	47 (1.9)	49 (1.9)	668 (26.4)
Source: https://en.climate-data.org/asia/russian-federation/kursk-oblast/d-yakonovo-495659/

== Transport ==
Dyakonovo is located on the roads of regional importance 38K-017 (Kursk – Lgov – Rylsk – border with Ukraine) and 38K-004 (Dyakonovo – Sudzha – border with Ukraine), on the roads of intermunicipal significance 38H-073 (Dyakonovo – Starkovo – Sokolovka) and 38H-078 (38K-004 – a part of a selo Dyakonovo: 4th Okolotok), 3.5 km from the nearest railway station Dyakonovo (railway line Lgov I — Kursk).

The rural locality is situated 29 km from Kursk Vostochny Airport, 117 km from Belgorod International Airport and 230 km from Voronezh Peter the Great Airport.
