= Lgov, Kursk Oblast =

Town in Kursk Oblast, Russia

Lgov Льгов
- Town
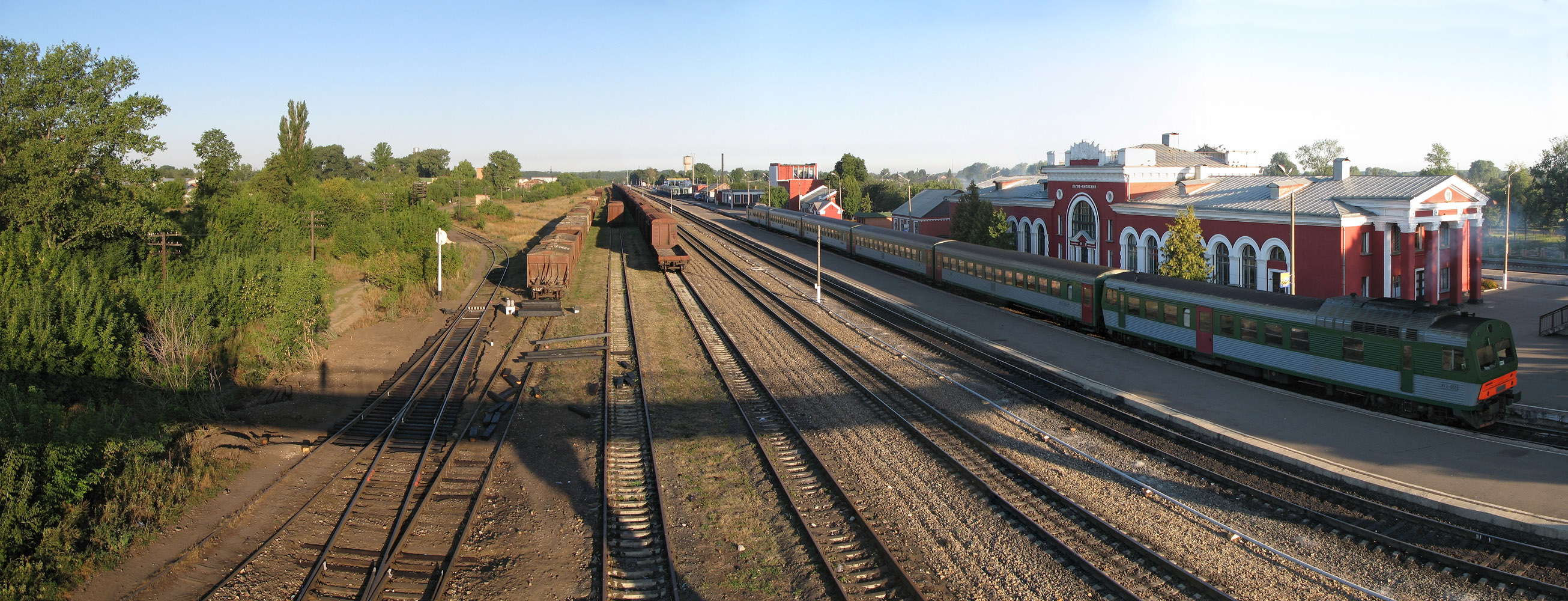
- Lgov-Kiyevsky railway station in Lgov

- Coat of arms
- Interactive map of Lgov
- Location of Lgov Lgov (Russia)
- Coordinates: 51°40′N 35°16′E
- Country: Russia
- Federal subject: Kursk Oblast
- First mentioned: 1152
- Town status since: 1779
- Elevation: 150 m (490 ft)

Population (2010 Census)
  - Total: 21,453
  - Estimate (2024): 16,779 (−21.8%)

Administrative status
  - Subordinated to: town of oblast significance of Lgov
  - Capital of: Lgovsky District, town of oblast significance of Lgov

Municipal status
  - Urban okrug: Lgov Urban Okrug
  - Capital of: Lgov Urban Okrug, Lgovsky Municipal District
- Time zone: UTC+3 (MSK)
- Postal code: 307750
- OKTMO ID: 38710000001

Lgov (Russian: Льгов, IPA: [ˈlʲɡof]) is a town in Kursk Oblast, Russia, located on both sides of the Seym river (a tributary of the Desna) 80 kilometers (50 mi) west of Kursk and an equal distance from Hlukhiv, Ukraine. Population as of 2021 was 17,557.

== History ==
It was first mentioned in a chronicle in 1152 under the name of Olgov (a possessive adjective from an old Russian name Olg, or Oleg).

Lgov was razed to the ground by the Mongols.

In 1669, Lgov Monastery was founded on the spot of the former town, which would be closed down in 1764. The monastic sloboda was transformed into the town of Lgov in 1779.

In 1852 towards the start of his career, Turgenev wrote a chapter in A Sportsman's Sketches entitled Lgov, in which a group of men go hunting in the lake with a pretentious hunter named Vladimir, sink the boat, and then wade to shore filthy after great difficulty.

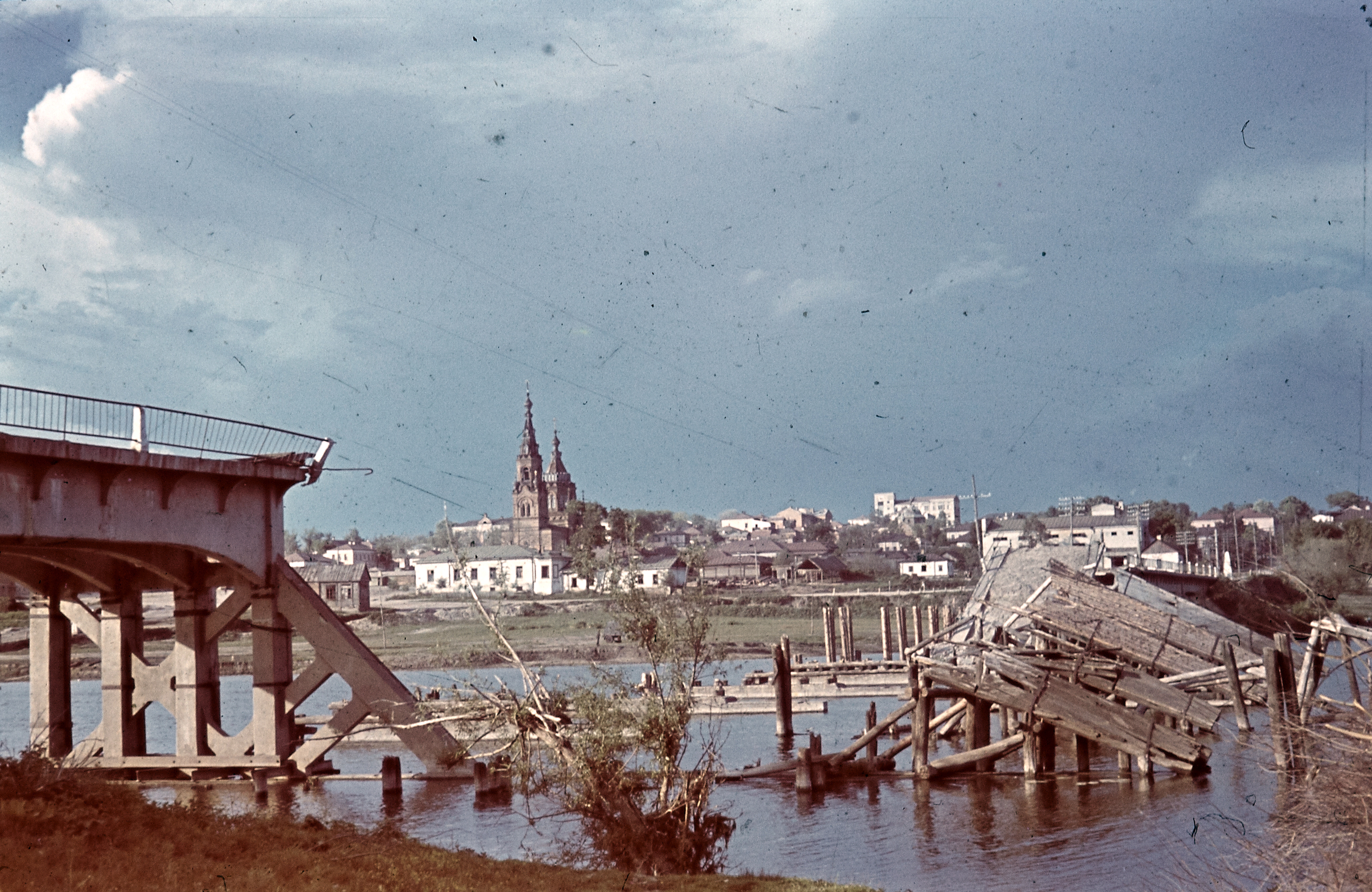
Lgov in 1942

During World War II, Lgov was occupied by German troops from 27 October 1941 to 3 March 1943.

On September 18, 2022, the town was heavily damaged by a significant F2/T5 tornado. Over 200 structures were damaged or destroyed as a result of this strong wedge tornado. Many residential structures had roofs torn off, and some sustained collapse of their exterior walls, but most of these structures were poorly built homes. Numerous trees were downed, and high-voltage power lines were also damaged or destroyed.

In August 2024, at the same time as the Russian authorities declared a "Federal-level" emergency, Lgov was first mentioned in a report during the Ukrainian incursion into Kursk. By late 2024, even though Lgov remained some 20 km behind the front lines of the engagement of military forces, the town became more frequently involved in hostilities. On 31 December 2024, multiple Ukrainian Storm Shadow long-range missiles struck Lgov including a Russian command bunker and a Russian troop barracks of the 810th Naval Infantry Brigade. Initial Russian news reports were that 8 military members were killed and 22 injured and hospitalized.

== Administrative and municipal status ==
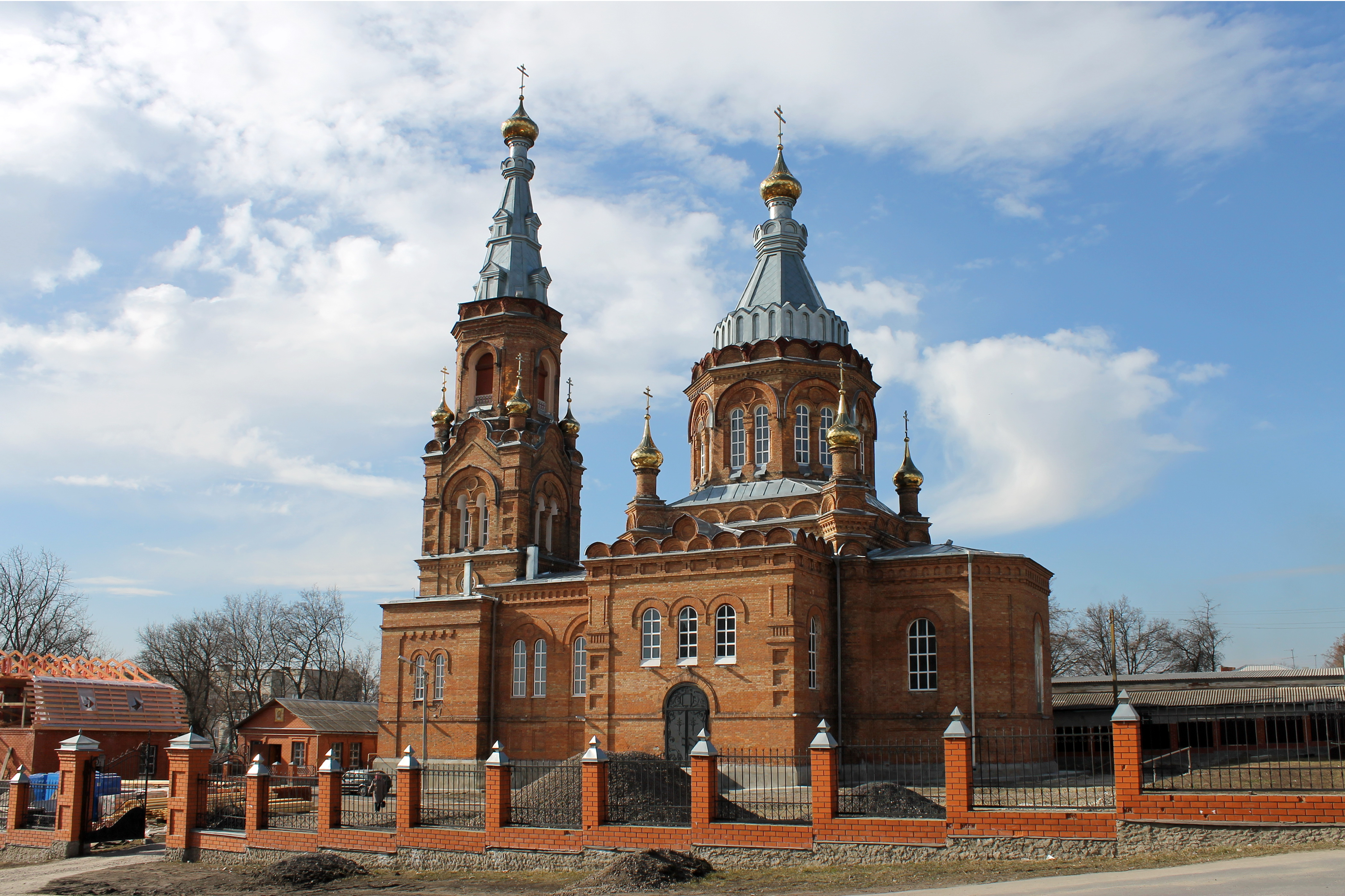
Lgov Cathedral

Within the framework of administrative divisions, Lgov served as the administrative center of Lgovsky District, even though it is not a part of it. As an administrative division, it is incorporated separately as the town of oblast significance of Lgov—an administrative unit with the status equal to that of the districts. As a municipal division, the town of oblast significance of Lgov is incorporated as Lgov Urban Okrug.

== Economy ==
Lgov Prison, a prison of the Federal Penitentiary Service, is located in Lgov.

In addition to being a fluvial city, Lgov is also a railway hub with five tracks in its station.

== Demographics ==
Population: 17,557 (2021 census); 21,453 (2010 census); 23,783 (2002 census); 25,643 (1989 Soviet census); 26,000 (1972).

== Notable people ==
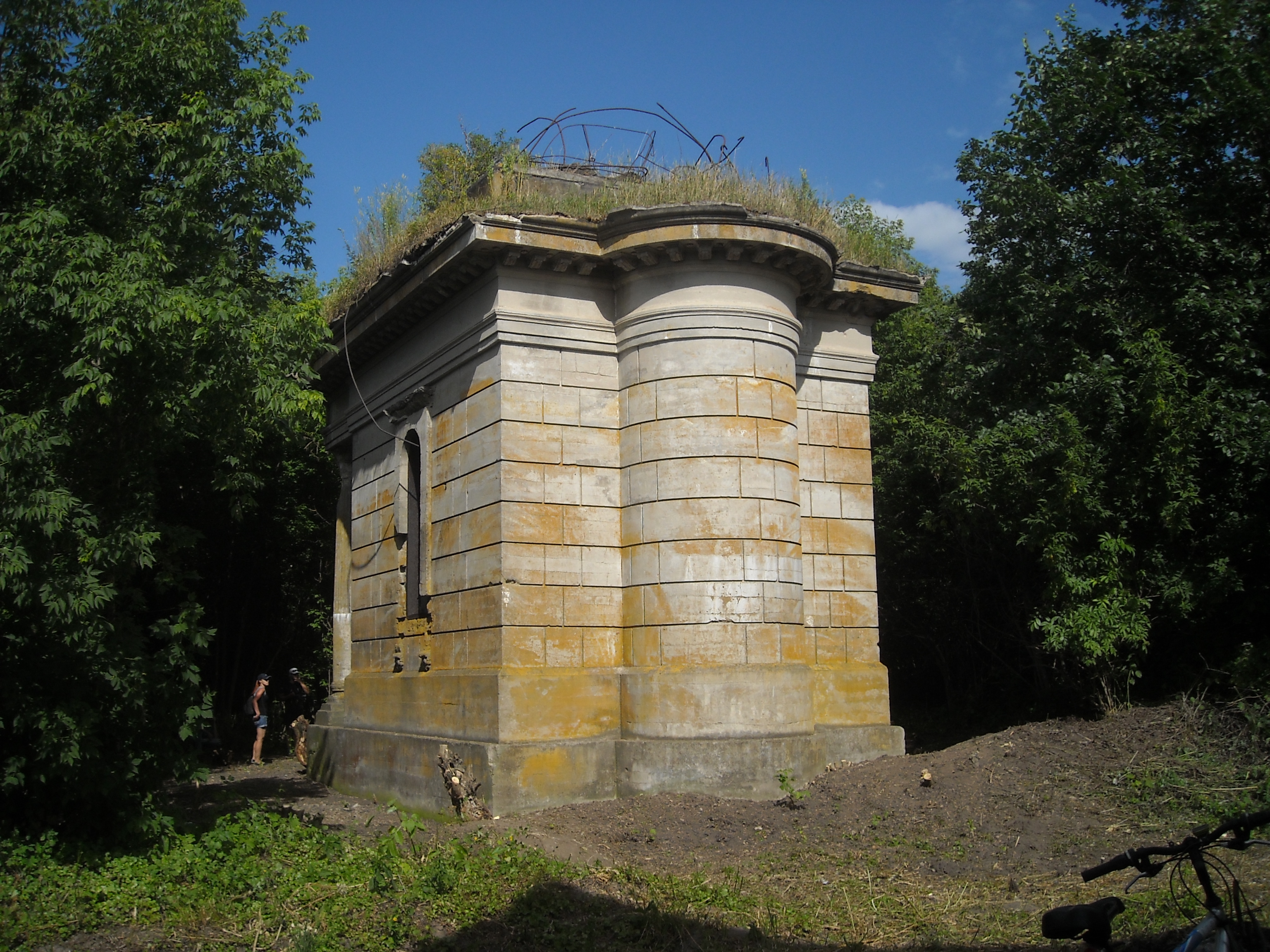
Stremoukhov Mausoleum in Lgov

- Tetiana Andriienko (1938–2016), botanist, conservationist, and professor
- Nikolay Aseyev (1889—1963), poet
- Boris Bukreev (1859–1962), mathematician
- Arkady Gaidar (1904—1941), writer
- Tamara Syomina (born 1938), film actress
