= Pryamitsyno =

Pryamitsyno Прямицыно
- Urban-type settlement
- Interactive map of Pryamitsyno
- Location of Pryamitsyno Pryamitsyno (Kursk Oblast)
- Coordinates: 51.6539°N 35.9380°E
- Country: Russia
- Federal subject: Kursk Oblast
- Administrative district: Oktyabrsky District

Population (2010 Census)
  - Total: 5,094
  - Estimate (2025): 5,145 (+1%)
- Time zone: UTC+3 (MSK)
- Postal code: 307200
- OKTMO ID: 38628151051

Pryamitsyno (Russian: Прямицыно) is an urban locality (an urban-type settlement) in Oktyabrsky District of Kursk Oblast, Russia. Population: 5,179 (2021 census); 5,094 (2010 census); 5,239 (2002 census); 5,821 (1989 Soviet census).
