= Rylsk, Russia =

Town in Kursk Oblast, Russia

Rylsk Рыльск
- Town
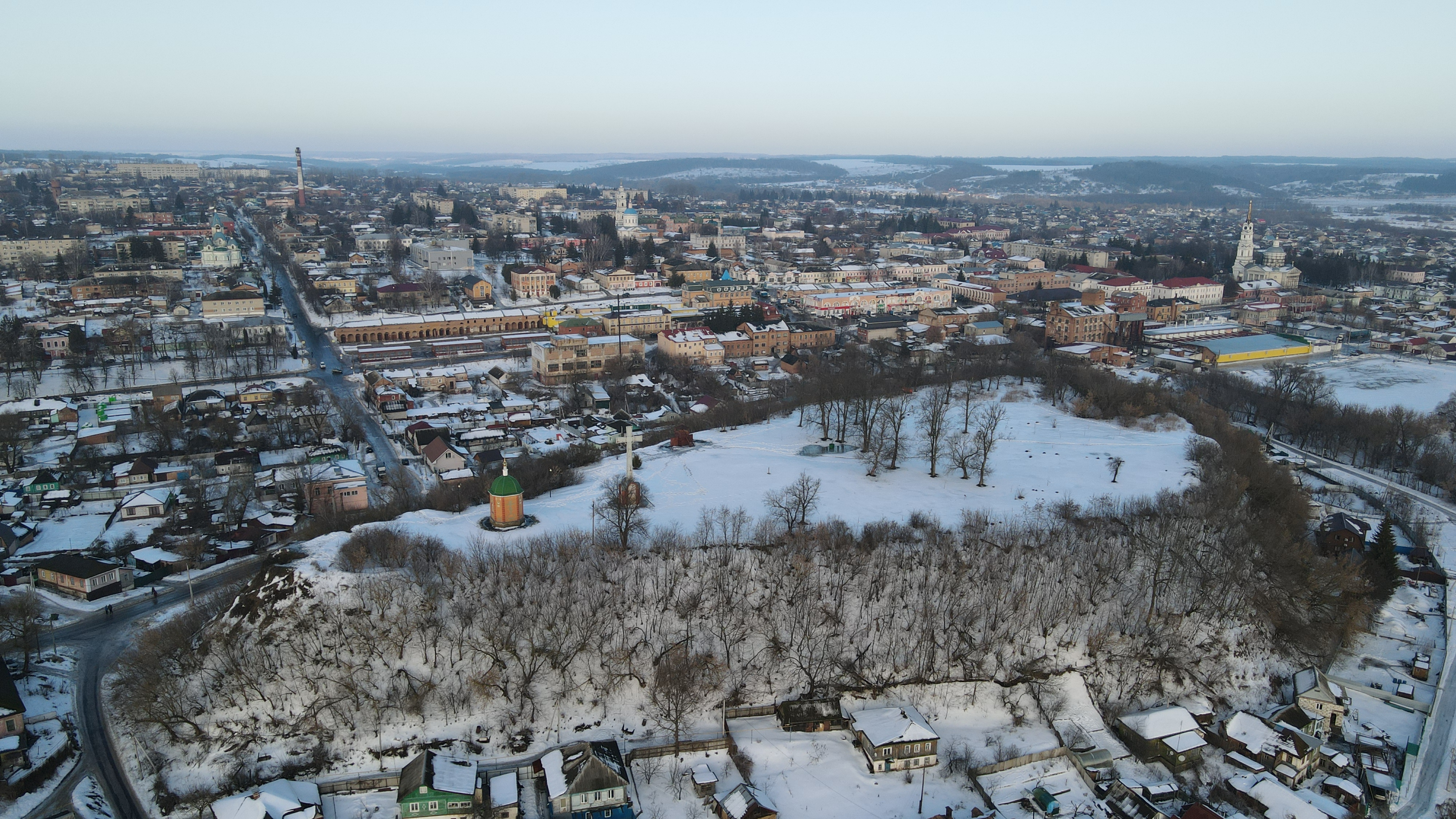
- View of Rylsk

- Flag Coat of arms
- Interactive map of Rylsk
- Location of Rylsk Rylsk (European Russia) Rylsk (Russia)
- Coordinates: 51°34′N 34°40′E
- Country: Russia
- Federal subject: Kursk Oblast
- Administrative district: Rylsky District
- Town of district significanceSelsoviet: Rylsk
- First mentioned: 1152
- Elevation: 160 m (520 ft)

Population (2010 Census)
  - Total: 15,671
  - Estimate (2024): 14,843 (−5.3%)

Administrative status
  - Capital of: Rylsky District, town of district significance of Rylsk

Municipal status
  - Municipal district: Rylsky Municipal District
  - Urban settlement: Rylsk Urban Settlement
  - Capital of: Rylsky Municipal District, Rylsk Urban Settlement
- Time zone: UTC+3 (MSK)
- Postal codes: 307370, 307371, 307373, 307374, 307379
- OKTMO ID: 38634101001
- Website: administracia.rylsk.ru

Rylsk (Russian: Рыльск) is a town and the administrative center of Rylsky District in Kursk Oblast, western Russia, located on the right bank of the Seym River (Dnieper's basin) 124 kilometres (77 mi) west of Kursk, the administrative center of the oblast. Population: 15,069 (2021 census); 15,671 (2010 census); 17,603 (2002 census); 19,472 (1989 Soviet census); 19,000 (1974).

== History ==
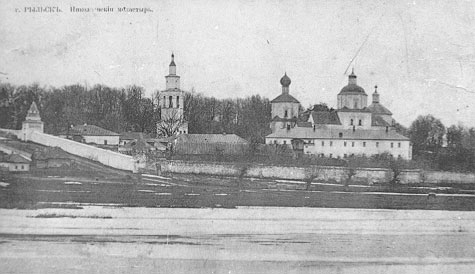
St. Nicholas Monastery in c. 1912

Rylsk was first mentioned in a chronicle in 1152 as one of the Severian towns. It had become the seat of an appanage principality by the end of the 12th century before coming into the hands of Lithuanian rulers sometime in the late 13th or early 14th century. The Polish king Casimir IV made a grant of it to Dmitry Shemyaka's son Ivan, who had settled in Lithuania. Ivan's son Vasily defected to the Grand Duchy of Moscow, but Lithuanians held the town until 1522.

During the Time of Troubles, it was one of the first towns to welcome False Dmitry I as the Tsar. After Ukraine's integration into the Russian Empire, Rylsk capitalized on the trade between Little Russia and Great Russia. Numerous merchants resided in the town. Today its population is the same as it had been about a century before.

Soviet authority in Rylsk was established in November 1917. In mid-1918, at the end of the first Ukrainian–Soviet War, Rylsk briefly became part of the Ukrainian State. It was retaken by the Soviets at the start of the second war.

During World War II, the town was occupied by the German Army from October 5, 1941 to August 31, 1943.

== Administrative and municipal status ==
Within the framework of administrative divisions, Rylsk serves as the administrative center of Rylsky District. As an administrative division, it is incorporated within Rylsky District as the town of district significance of Rylsk. As a municipal division, the town of district significance of Rylsk is incorporated within Rylsky Municipal District as Rylsk Urban Settlement.

== Attractions ==
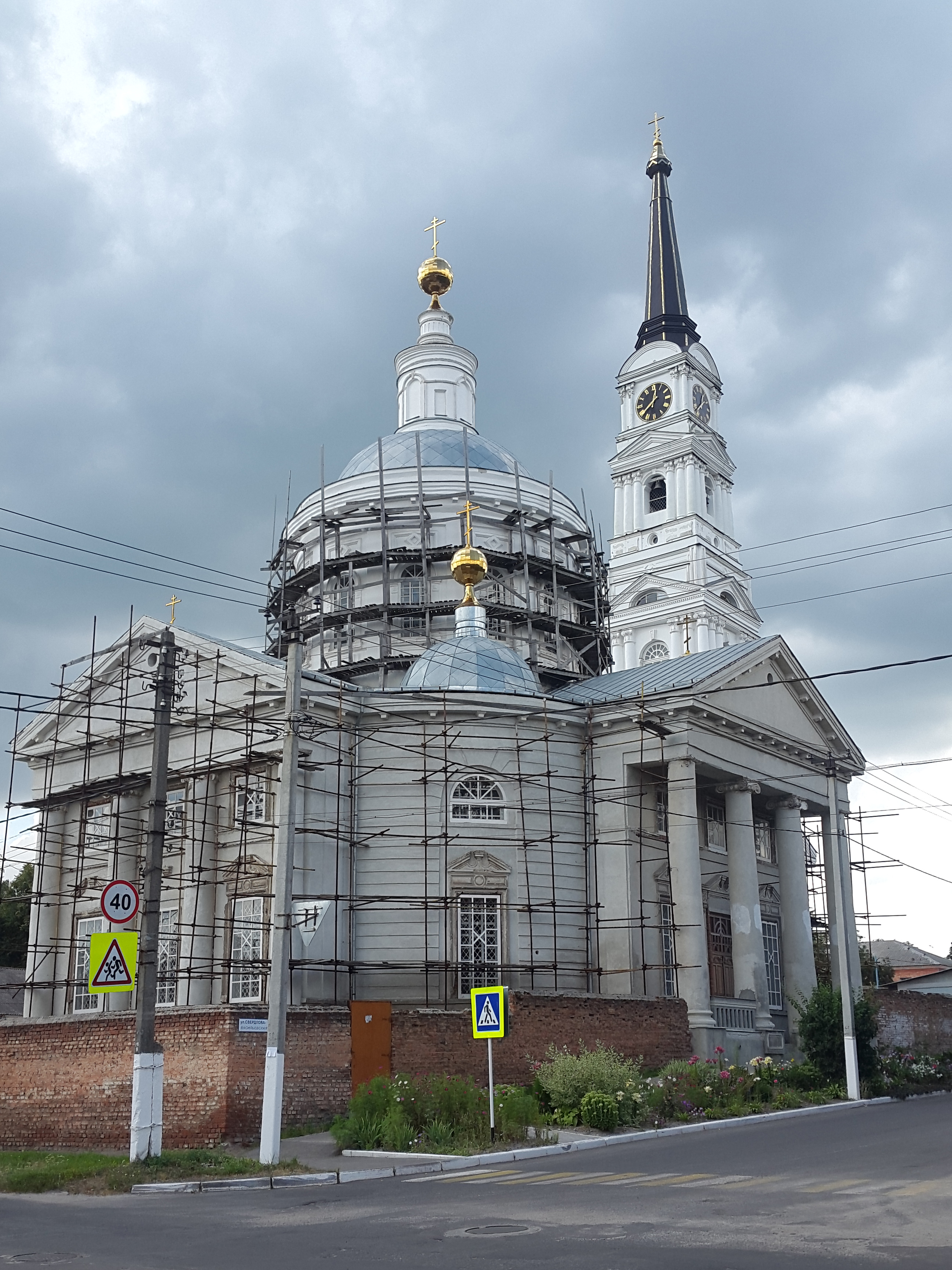
Uspensky Cathedral

Its oldest buildings are the three churches of the monastery of St. Nicholas, all erected in the mid-18th century. Some of the most prominent buildings in the town were commissioned by the Shelikhov merchants who traded with Alaska Natives in North America in the late 18th century, the most famous of whom, Grigory Shelikhov, was born in the town. A monument was erected to his memory on the central square. The foremost of the town's churches are the Uspensky Cathedral (1811) and the Pokrovsky Cathedral (1822).

== See also ==
- Bibliography of Russian history
