= Oktyabrsky District, Kursk Oblast =

Oktyabrsky District Октябрьский район (Russian)
- District
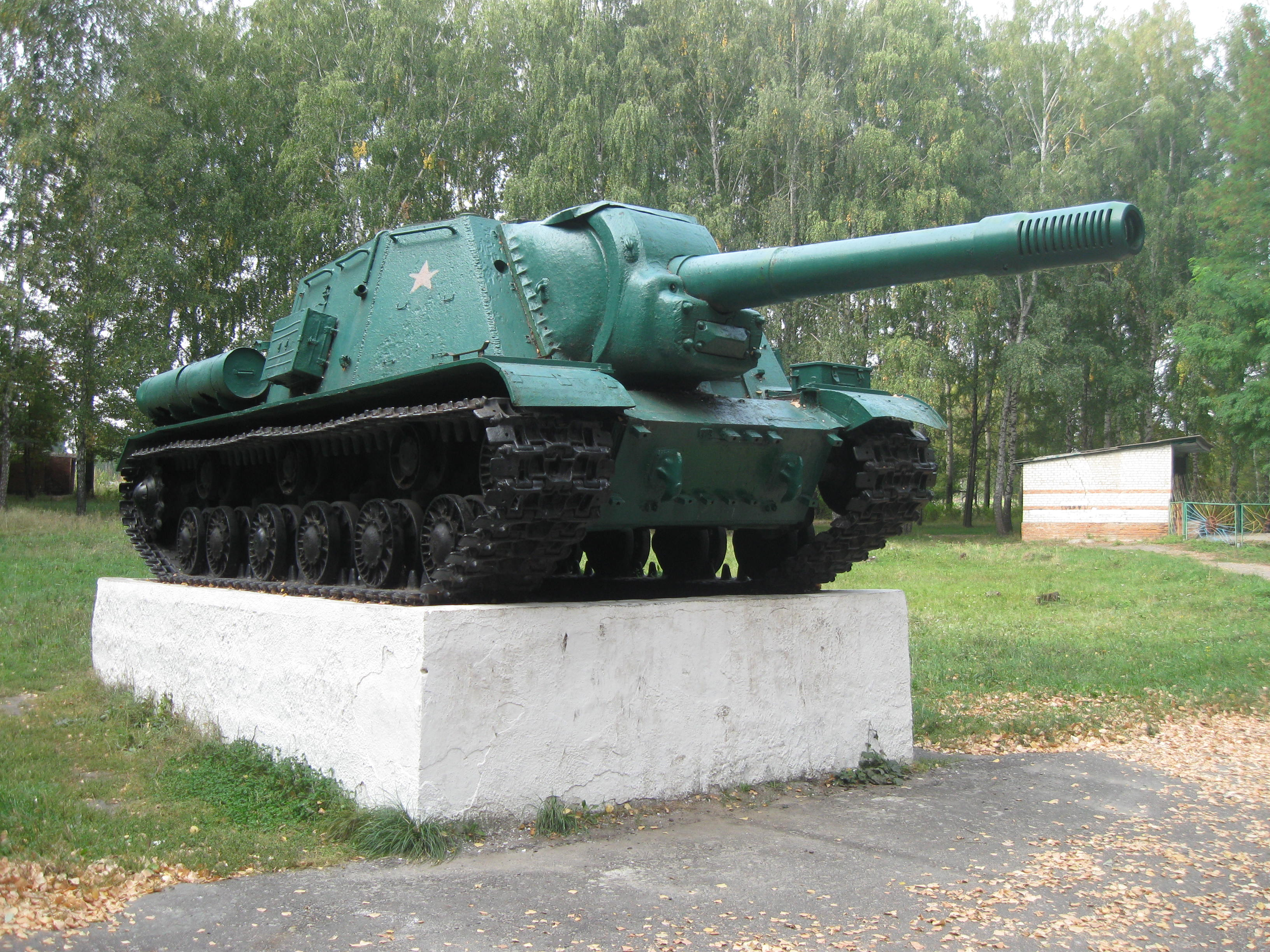
- ISU-152 self-propelled gun, Oktyabrsky District

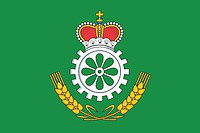
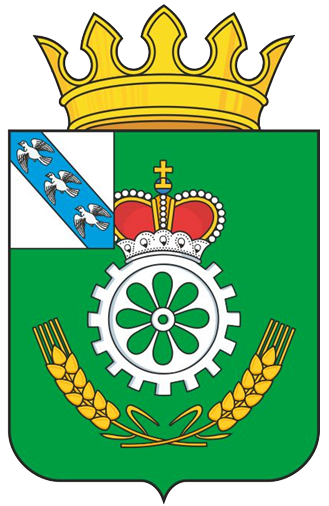
- Flag Coat of arms
- Location of Oktyabrsky District in Kursk Oblast
- Coordinates: 51°39′N 35°55′E
- Country: Russia
- Federal subject: Kursk Oblast
- Administrative center: Pryamitsyno

Area
  - Total: 628 km^{2} (242 sq mi)

Population (2010 Census)
  - Total: 22,569
  - Density: 35.9/km^{2} (93.1/sq mi)
  - Urban: 22.6%
  - Rural: 77.4%

Administrative structure
  - Administrative divisions: 1 Work settlements, 10 Selsoviets
  - Inhabited localities: 1 urban-type settlements, 92 rural localities

Municipal structure
  - Municipally incorporated as: Oktyabrsky Municipal District
  - Municipal divisions: 1 urban settlements, 10 rural settlements
- Time zone: UTC+3 (MSK)
- OKTMO ID: 38628000
- Website: http://oktiabr.rkursk.ru/

Oktyabrsky District (Russian: Октя́брьский райо́н) is an administrative and municipal district (raion), one of the twenty-eight in Kursk Oblast, Russia. It is located in the center of the oblast. The area of the district is 628 square kilometers (242 sq mi). Its administrative center is the urban locality (a work settlement) of Pryamitsyno. Population: 23,164 (2021 census); 22,569 (2010 census); 23,877 (2002 Census); 125,296 (1989 Soviet census). The population of Pryamitsyno accounts for 22.4% of the district's total population.

== Geography ==
Oktyabrsky District is located in the central region of Kursk Oblast. The terrain is hilly plain on the Central Russian Upland. The main river in the district is the Seym River (which from the district flows west to the Dnieper basin) and the Bolshaya Kuritsa, a minor tributary of the Seym. The district is 10 km west of the city of Kursk and 460 km southwest of Moscow. The area measures 40 km (north-south), and 15 km (west-east). The administrative center is the town of Pryamitsyno.

The district is bordered on the north by Fatezhsky District, on the east by Kursky District, on the south by Medvensky District, and on the west by Kurchatovsky District.
