= Kochetno =

Rural locality in Kursk Oblast, Russia

Kochetno Кочетно
- Selo
- Interactive map of Kochetno
- Location of Kochetno Kochetno (Kursk Oblast)
- Coordinates: 51°44′46″N 35°22′38″E
- Country: Russia
- Federal subject: Kursk Oblast
- Administrative district: Lgovsky District
- SelsovietSelsoviet: Ivanchikovsky

Population (2010 Census)
  - Total: 13
  - Estimate (2010): 13 (0%)

Municipal status
  - Municipal district: Lgovsky Municipal District
  - Rural settlement: Ivanchikovsky Selsoviet Rural Settlement
- Time zone: UTC+3 (MSK)
- Postal code: 307732
- Dialing code: +7 47140
- OKTMO ID: 38622435106
- Website: ivanchikovo.ru

Kochetno (Russian: Кочетно) is a rural locality (Russian: село, lit. 'village') in Ivanchikovsky Selsoviet Rural Settlement, Lgovsky District, Kursk Oblast, Russia. Population: 13 (2010 census); 42 (2002 census);

== Geography ==
The village is located on the Kochetna Brook (a left tributary of the Prutishche in the basin of the Seym), 59 km from the Russia–Ukraine border, 56 km west of Kursk, 10 km north-east of the district center – the town Lgov, 3 km from the selsoviet center – Ivanchikovo.

Climate

Kochetno has a warm-summer humid continental climate (Dfb in the Köppen climate classification).

== Transport ==
Kochetno is located 13 km from the road of regional importance 38K-017 (Kursk – Lgov – Rylsk – border with Ukraine) as part of the European route E38, 7.5 km from the road 38K-023 (Lgov – Konyshyovka), 12.5 km from the road of intermunicipal significance 38H-362 (38K-017 – Nikolayevka – Shirkovo), 3 km from the road 38H-437 (38K-023 – Olshanka – Marmyzhi – 38N-362), 3.5 km from the road 38H-435 (38N-437 – Polyachkovo), 9 km from the nearest railway halt Maritsa (railway line Navlya – Lgov-Kiyevsky).

The rural locality is situated 62 km from Kursk Vostochny Airport, 146 km from Belgorod International Airport and 265 km from Voronezh Peter the Great Airport.
