= Pesochny, Russia =

Pesochny (Russian: Песочный; masculine), Pesochnaya (Песочная; feminine), or Pesochnoye (Песочное; neuter) is the name of several inhabited localities in Russia.

== Arkhangelsk Oblast ==
As of 2010, one rural locality in Arkhangelsk Oblast bears this name:

- Pesochny, Arkhangelsk Oblast, a settlement in Kozminsky Selsoviet of Lensky District

== Belgorod Oblast ==
As of 2010, one rural locality in Belgorod Oblast bears this name:

- Pesochny, Belgorod Oblast, a khutor in Starooskolsky District

== Kaliningrad Oblast ==
As of 2010, two rural localities in Kaliningrad Oblast bear this name:

- Pesochnoye, Bagrationovsky District, Kaliningrad Oblast, a settlement in Gvardeysky Rural Okrug of Bagrationovsky District
- Pesochnoye, Pravdinsky District, Kaliningrad Oblast, a settlement under the administrative jurisdiction of the town of district significance of Pravdinsk in Pravdinsky District

== Kostroma Oblast ==
As of 2010, two rural localities in Kostroma Oblast bear this name:

- Pesochny, Kostroma Oblast, a settlement in Tikhonovskoye Settlement of Vokhomsky District
- Pesochnoye, Kostroma Oblast, a village in Baksheyevskoye Settlement of Kostromskoy District

== Krasnoyarsk Krai ==
As of 2010, one rural locality in Krasnoyarsk Krai bears this name:

- Pesochny, Krasnoyarsk Krai, a settlement in Yermakovsky Selsoviet of Yermakovsky District

== Kursk Oblast ==
As of 2010, two rural localities in Kursk Oblast bear this name:

- Pesochny, Kursk Oblast, a khutor in Ivanchikovsky Selsoviet of Lgovsky District
- Pesochnoye, Kursk Oblast, a khutor in Gostomlyansky Selsoviet of Medvensky District

== Leningrad Oblast ==
As of 2010, one rural locality in Leningrad Oblast bears this name:

- Pesochnoye, Leningrad Oblast, a logging depot settlement in Polyanskoye Settlement Municipal Formation of Vyborgsky District

== Mari El Republic ==
As of 2010, one rural locality in the Mari El Republic bears this name:

- Pesochnoye, Mari El Republic, a village in Nezhnursky Rural Okrug of Kilemarsky District

== Republic of Mordovia ==
As of 2010, one rural locality in the Republic of Mordovia bears this name:

- Pesochny, Republic of Mordovia, a settlement in Ladsky Selsoviet of Ichalkovsky District

== Moscow Oblast ==
As of 2010, one rural locality in Moscow Oblast bears this name:

- Pesochnoye, Moscow Oblast, a village in Uzunovskoye Rural Settlement of Serebryano-Prudsky District

== Nizhny Novgorod Oblast ==
As of 2010, four rural localities in Nizhny Novgorod Oblast bear this name:

- Pesochnoye, Semyonov, Nizhny Novgorod Oblast, a village in Pafnutovsky Selsoviet of the town of oblast significance of Semyonov
- Pesochnoye, Bogorodsky District, Nizhny Novgorod Oblast, a village in Aleshkovsky Selsoviet of Bogorodsky District
- Pesochnoye, Knyagininsky District, Nizhny Novgorod Oblast, a selo in Solovyevsky Selsoviet of Knyagininsky District
- Pesochnoye, Voskresensky District, Nizhny Novgorod Oblast, a village in Staroustinsky Selsoviet of Voskresensky District

== Oryol Oblast ==
As of 2010, one rural locality in Oryol Oblast bears this name:

- Pesochnoye, Oryol Oblast, a selo in Pesochensky Selsoviet of Verkhovsky District

== Saint Petersburg ==
As of 2010, one urban locality in Saint Petersburg bears this name:

- Pesochny, Saint Petersburg, a municipal settlement in Kurortny District

== Samara Oblast ==
As of 2010, two rural localities in Samara Oblast bear this name:

- Pesochny, Samara Oblast, a settlement in Syzransky District
- Pesochnoye, Samara Oblast, a selo in Bezenchuksky District

== Tula Oblast ==
As of 2010, one rural locality in Tula Oblast bears this name:

- Pesochnoye, Tula Oblast, a village in Aransky Rural Okrug of Arsenyevsky District

== Vladimir Oblast ==
As of 2010, two rural localities in Vladimir Oblast bear this name:

- Pesochnoye, Vladimir Oblast, a village in Suzdalsky District
- Pesochnaya, Russia, a village in Alexandrovsky District

== Vologda Oblast ==
As of 2010, one rural locality in Vologda Oblast bears this name:

- Pesochnoye, Vologda Oblast, a settlement in Kubensky Selsoviet of Vologodsky District

== Yaroslavl Oblast ==
As of 2010, two rural localities in Yaroslavl Oblast bear this name:

- Pesochnoye, Rostovsky District, Yaroslavl Oblast, a selo in Shurskolsky Rural Okrug of Rostovsky District
- Pesochnoye, Rybinsky District, Yaroslavl Oblast, a settlement in Pesochensky Rural Okrug of Rybinsky District
