= Krasny Pakhar, Lgovsky District, Kursk Oblast =

Rural locality in Kursk Oblast, Russia

Krasny Pakhar Красный Пахарь
- Khutor
- Interactive map of Krasny Pakhar
- Location of Krasny Pakhar Krasny Pakhar (Kursk Oblast)
- Coordinates: 51°47′53″N 35°18′45″E
- Country: Russia
- Federal subject: Kursk Oblast
- Administrative district: Lgovsky District
- SelsovietSelsoviet: Maritsky

Population (2010 Census)
  - Total: 13
  - Estimate (2010): 13 (0%)

Municipal status
  - Municipal district: Lgovsky Municipal District
  - Rural settlement: Maritsky Selsoviet Rural Settlement
- Time zone: UTC+3 (MSK)
- Postal code: 307705
- Dialing code: +7 47140
- OKTMO ID: 38622464111
- Website: marickiy.ru

Krasny Pakhar (Russian: Красный Пахарь) is a rural locality (a khutor) in Maritsky Selsoviet Rural Settlement, Lgovsky District, Kursk Oblast, Russia. Population: 13 (2010 census); 23 (2002 census);

== Geography ==
The khutor is located in the Prutishche River basin (a tributary of the Seym), 64.5 km from the Russia–Ukraine border, 61 km north-west of Kursk, 16 km north-east of the district center – the town Lgov, 5.5 km from the selsoviet center – Maritsa.

Climate

Krasny Pakhar has a warm-summer humid continental climate (Dfb in the Köppen climate classification).

== Transport ==
Krasny Pakhar is located, 19 km from the road of regional importance 38K-017 (Kursk – Lgov – Rylsk – border with Ukraine) as part of the European route E38, 5 km from the road 38K-023 (Lgov – Konyshyovka), 17.5 km from the road of intermunicipal significance 38H-362 (38K-017 – Nikolayevka – Shirkovo), 4.5 km from the road 38H-437 (38K-023 – Olshanka – Marmyzhi – 38N-362), 0.5 km from the road 38H-434 (38N-437 – Krasnaya Dubrava), 0.5 km from the nearest railway halt 565 km (railway line Navlya – Lgov-Kiyevsky).

The rural locality is situated 67 km from Kursk Vostochny Airport, 155 km from Belgorod International Airport and 271 km from Voronezh Peter the Great Airport.
