= Novyye Prudy, Kursk Oblast =

Rural locality in Kursk Oblast, Russia

Novyye Prudy Новые Пруды
- Khutor
- Interactive map of Novyye Prudy
- Location of Novyye Prudy Novyye Prudy (Kursk Oblast)
- Coordinates: 51°46′36″N 35°17′48″E
- Country: Russia
- Federal subject: Kursk Oblast
- Administrative district: Lgovsky District
- SelsovietSelsoviet: Maritsky

Population (2010 Census)
  - Total: 7
  - Estimate (2010): 7 (0%)

Municipal status
  - Municipal district: Lgovsky Municipal District
  - Rural settlement: Maritsky Selsoviet Rural Settlement
- Time zone: UTC+3 (MSK)
- Postal code: 307705
- Dialing code: +7 47140
- OKTMO ID: 38622464121
- Website: marickiy.ru

Novyye Prudy (Russian: Новые Пруды) is a rural locality (a khutor) in Maritsky Selsoviet Rural Settlement, Lgovsky District, Kursk Oblast, Russia. Population: 7 (2010 census); 9 (2002 census);

== Geography ==
The khutor is located on the Prutishche River in the basin of the Seym, 62 km from the Russia–Ukraine border, 62 km north-west of Kursk, 13 km north-east of the district center – the town Lgov, 4 km from the selsoviet center – Maritsa.

Climate

Novyye Prudy has a warm-summer humid continental climate (Dfb in the Köppen climate classification).

== Transport ==
Novyye Prudy is located 16.5 km from the road of regional importance 38K-017 (Kursk – Lgov – Rylsk – border with Ukraine) as part of the European route E38, 3.5 km from the road 38K-023 (Lgov – Konyshyovka), 18 km from the road of intermunicipal significance 38H-362 (38K-017 – Nikolayevka – Shirkovo), 2.5 km from the road 38H-437 (38K-023 – Olshanka – Marmyzhi – 38N-362), on the road 38H-434 (38N-437 – Krasnaya Dubrava), 2 km from the nearest railway halt 565 km (railway line Navlya – Lgov-Kiyevsky).

The rural locality is situated 68 km from Kursk Vostochny Airport, 153 km from Belgorod International Airport and 271 km from Voronezh Peter the Great Airport.
