= Tovarnaya Line =

Tovarnaya line Russian: Товарная линия
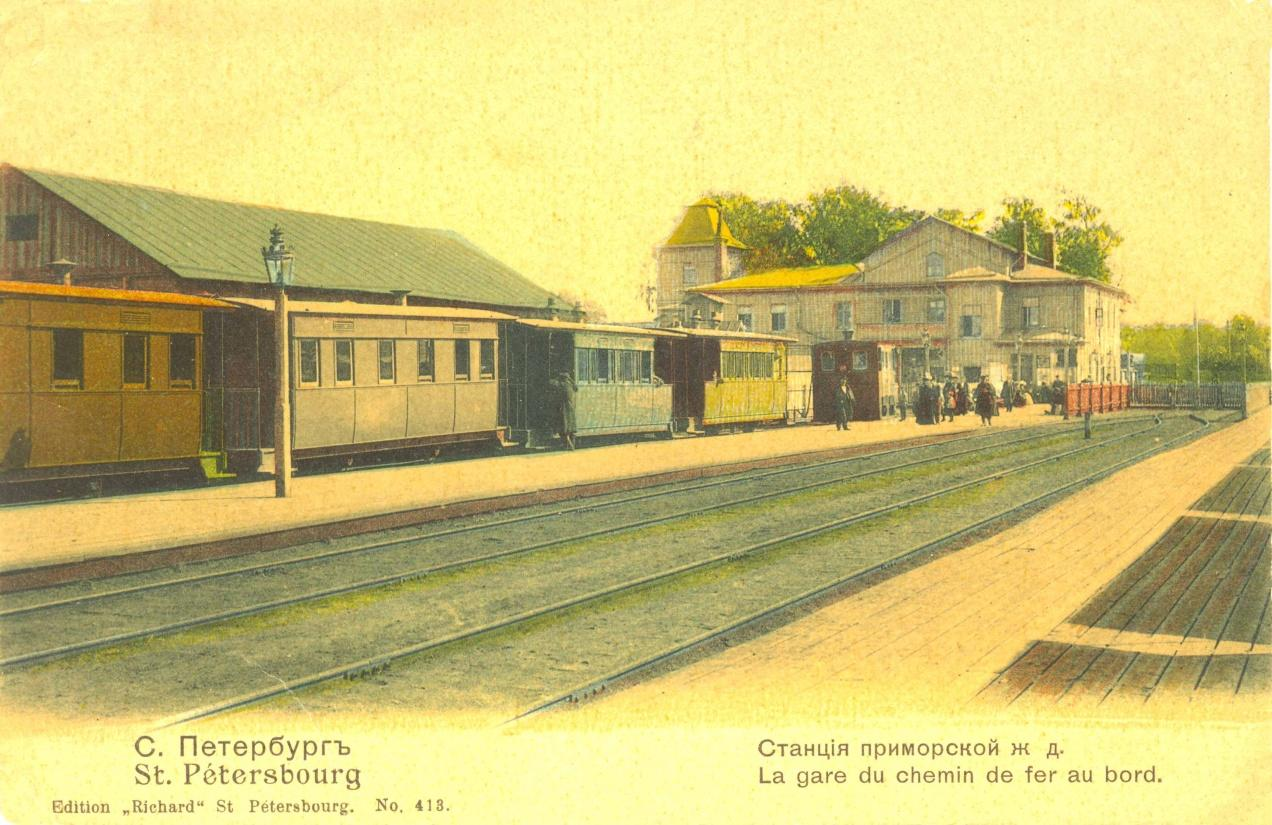
- Main station of Tovarnaya line - "Primorsky Rail Terminal"

Overview
- Status: Local
- Locale: Novaya Derevnya, St. Petersburg, Russia
- Termini: Primorsky Rail Terminal, Primorsky - goods, from 1924 - Novaya Derevnya; Flugov post, from 1924 - Finlyandsky Rail Terminal
- Stations: 4

Service
- Type: Heavy rail
- System: Commuter cargo and passenger railroad
- Services: Primorsky Rail Terminal - Flugov post, Primorsky - goods - Flugov post, from 1924 - Novaya Derevnya - Finlyandsky Rail Terminal

History
- Opened: 1904
- Closed: 1929

Technical
- Line length: 6.8 km (4.23 mi)
- Track gauge: 1,524 mm (5 ft)

Tovarnaya line was designed to connect Primorsky Rail Terminal with the city centre of Saint Petersburg. It was planned to construct a new terminal station between Finlyandsky Rail Terminal and the Military Medical Academy.

== History ==
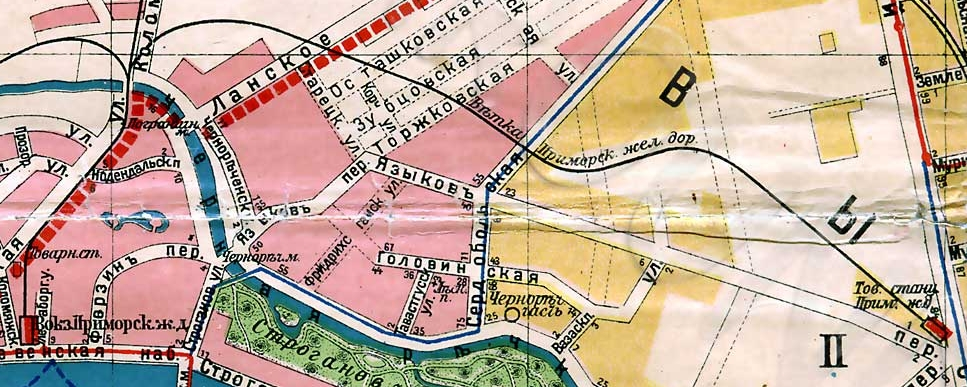
Line in 1916: Primorsky Rail Terminal - Flugov post

In 1904, the line from Finlyandsky Rail Terminal to Flyugov post rail station was constructed. The engineer was P. A. Avenarius. In May 1904, this part was opened.

Catastrophic flooding on 23 September 1924 put the Primorsky Rail Terminal out of commission and all passengers were re-routed to the Finlyandsky Rail Terminal in 1925.

By 1926, the line to Sestroretsk had been laid through Lanskaya station. In 1929, the line was reconstructed. The stations Flyugov post and Serdobolsky stop were no longer required and they were dismantled.

== See also ==
- Connecting Line
- Volkovskaya railway station
