= Predpankeyevsky =

Rural locality in Kursk Oblast, Russia

Predpankeyevsky Предпанкеевский
- Settlement
- Interactive map of Predpankeyevsky
- Location of Predpankeyevsky Predpankeyevsky (Kursk Oblast)
- Coordinates: 51°46′44″N 35°23′52″E
- Country: Russia
- Federal subject: Kursk Oblast
- Administrative district: Lgovsky District
- SelsovietSelsoviet: Ivanchikovsky

Population (2010 Census)
  - Total: 3
  - Estimate (2010): 3 (0%)

Municipal status
  - Municipal district: Lgovsky Municipal District
  - Rural settlement: Ivanchikovsky Selsoviet Rural Settlement
- Time zone: UTC+3 (MSK)
- Postal code: 307733
- Dialing code: +7 47140
- OKTMO ID: 38622435151
- Website: ivanchikovo.ru

Predpankeyevsky (Russian: Предпанкеевский) is a rural locality (a settlement) in Ivanchikovsky Selsoviet Rural Settlement, Lgovsky District, Kursk Oblast, Russia. Population: 3 (2010 census); 32 (2002 census);

== Geography ==
The settlement is located on the Prutishche River in the basin of the Seym, 64 km from the Russia–Ukraine border, 55 km north-west of Kursk, 15 km north-east of the district center – the town Lgov, 4.5 km from the selsoviet center – Ivanchikovo.

Climate

Predpankeyevsky has a warm-summer humid continental climate (Dfb in the Köppen climate classification).

== Transport ==
Predpankeyevsky is located 17.5 km from the road of regional importance 38K-017 (Kursk – Lgov – Rylsk – border with Ukraine) as part of the European route E38, 9.5 km from the road 38K-023 (Lgov – Konyshyovka), 11 km from the road of intermunicipal significance 38H-362 (38K-017 – Nikolayevka – Shirkovo), on the road 38H-437 (38K-023 – Olshanka – Marmyzhi – 38N-362), 7 km from the nearest railway halt 565 km (railway line Navlya – Lgov-Kiyevsky).

The rural locality is situated 61 km from Kursk Vostochny Airport, 150 km from Belgorod International Airport and 264 km from Voronezh Peter the Great Airport.
