= Ponura, Kursk Oblast =

Rural locality in Kursk Oblast, Russia

Ponura Понура
- Khutor
- Interactive map of Ponura
- Location of Ponura Ponura (Kursk Oblast)
- Coordinates: 51°47′10″N 35°21′43″E
- Country: Russia
- Federal subject: Kursk Oblast
- Administrative district: Lgovsky District
- SelsovietSelsoviet: Ivanchikovsky

Population (2010 Census)
  - Total: 9
  - Estimate (2010): 9 (0%)

Municipal status
  - Municipal district: Lgovsky Municipal District
  - Rural settlement: Ivanchikovsky Selsoviet Rural Settlement
- Time zone: UTC+3 (MSK)
- Postal code: 307732
- Dialing code: +7 47140
- OKTMO ID: 38622435131
- Website: ivanchikovo.ru

Ponura (Russian: Понура) is a rural locality (a khutor) in Ivanchikovsky Selsoviet Rural Settlement, Lgovsky District, Kursk Oblast, Russia. Population: 9 (2010 census); 8 (2002 census);

== Geography ==
The khutor is located on the Kotlevka River at its confluence with the Vablya River (in the basin of the Seym), 64 km from the Russia–Ukraine border, 58 km north-west of Kursk, 14 km north-east of the district center – the town Lgov, 3.5 km from the selsoviet center – Ivanchikovo.

Climate

Ponura has a warm-summer humid continental climate (Dfb in the Köppen climate classification).

== Transport ==
Ponura is located 18 km from the road of regional importance 38K-017 (Kursk – Lgov – Rylsk – border with Ukraine) as part of the European route E38, 8 km from the road 38K-023 (Lgov – Konyshyovka), 14 km from the road of intermunicipal significance 38H-362 (38K-017 – Nikolayevka – Shirkovo), 2 km from the road 38H-437 (38K-023 – Olshanka – Marmyzhi – 38N-362), 4 km from the nearest railway halt 565 km (railway line Navlya – Lgov-Kiyevsky).

The rural locality is situated 64 km from Kursk Vostochny Airport, 152 km from Belgorod International Airport and 266 km from Voronezh Peter the Great Airport.
