= Lansky =

Lansky (masculine), Lanskaya (feminine), or Lanskoye (neuter) may refer to:

- Lansky (surname)
- Lansky (1999 film), about Meyer Lansky
- Lansky (2021 film), about Meyer Lansky
- Lansky Brothers, a clothing store in Memphis, United States
- Lanskaya railway station, a railway station in St. Petersburg, Russia
- Lanskaya electric substation, an electric substation of Lanskaya railway station
- Lanskoye, a rural locality (a village) in Tula Oblast, Russia

== See also ==
- Lansky score, a performance status scale for children with cancer
- Lensky (disambiguation)
