= Polyachkovo =

Rural locality in Kursk Oblast, Russia

Polyachkovo Полячково
- Village
- Interactive map of Polyachkovo
- Location of Polyachkovo Polyachkovo (Kursk Oblast)
- Coordinates: 51°46′16″N 35°21′35″E
- Country: Russia
- Federal subject: Kursk Oblast
- Administrative district: Lgovsky District
- SelsovietSelsoviet: Ivanchikovsky
- Elevation: 157 m (515 ft)

Population (2010 Census)
  - Total: 227
  - Estimate (2010): 227 (0%)

Municipal status
  - Municipal district: Lgovsky Municipal District
  - Rural settlement: Ivanchikovsky Selsoviet Rural Settlement
- Time zone: UTC+3 (MSK)
- Postal code: 307732
- Dialing code: +7 47140
- OKTMO ID: 38622435126
- Website: ivanchikovo.ru

Polyachkovo (Russian: Полячково) is a rural locality (Russian: деревня, lit. 'village') in Ivanchikovsky Selsoviet Rural Settlement, Lgovsky District, Kursk Oblast, Russia. Population: 227 (2010 census); 285 (2002 census);

== Geography ==
The village is located on the Prutishche River in the basin of the Seym, 62 km from the Russia–Ukraine border, 56 km north-west of Kursk, 9 km north-east of the district center – the town Lgov, 1.5 km from the selsoviet center – Ivanchikovo.

Climate

Polyachkovo has a warm-summer humid continental climate (Dfb in the Köppen climate classification).

== Transport ==
Polyachkovo is located 16 km from the road of regional importance 38K-017 (Kursk – Lgov – Rylsk – border with Ukraine) as part of the European route E38, 6 km from the road 38K-023 (Lgov – Konyshyovka), 13 km from the road of intermunicipal significance 38H-362 (38K-017 – Nikolayevka – Shirkovo), on the roads 38H-437 (38K-023 – Olshanka – Marmyzhi – 38N-362) and 38H-435 (38N-437 – Polyachkovo), 4.5 km from the nearest railway halt 565 km (railway line Navlya – Lgov-Kiyevsky).

The rural locality is situated 63 km from Kursk Vostochny Airport, 150 km from Belgorod International Airport and 266 km from Voronezh Peter the Great Airport.
