= Lansky station overpass =

Lansky station crossover
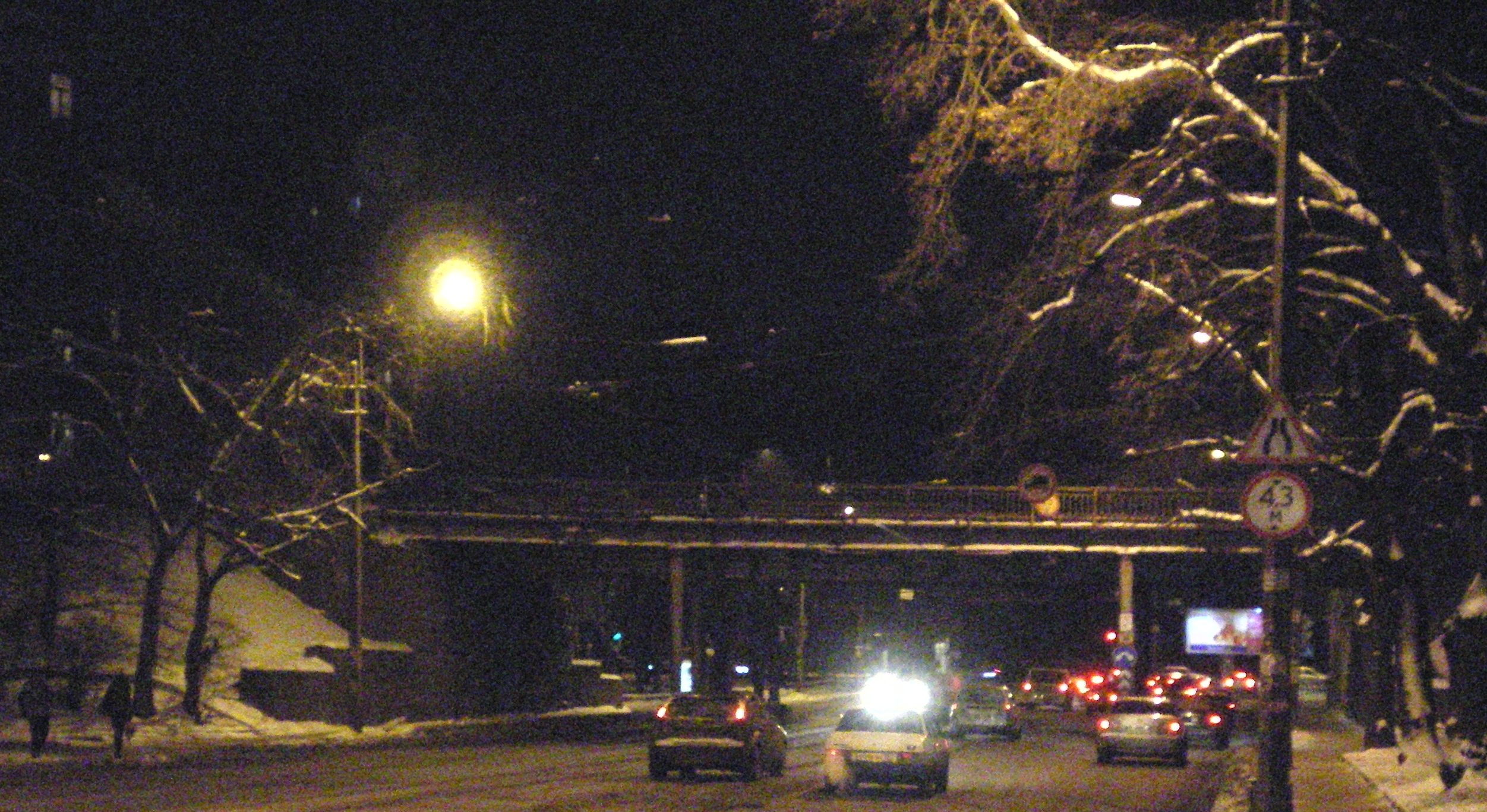
- Crossover at winter night
- Coordinates: 59°59′38″N 30°19′38″E
- Carries: Railroad
- Crosses: Serdobolsky street with tram line
- Locale: Between Lanskaya station platforms, Saint Peterburg, Russia
- Official name: Serdobolsky crossover
- Maintained by: RZhD, OktZhD, SPbZhD

Characteristics
- Design: Joist double bridge on metal tubular support and stone coastal foundations
- Material: Metal
- Total length: 30 m
- Width: 2 + 1 track way
- Longest span: 10 m
- No. of spans: 3

History
- Designer: Finnish Railways
- Construction end: 1869
- Opened: before 1910

Lansky station crossover is a railway bridge across Serdobolskaya Street in Saint Peterburg, Russia. On either side of it, on high embankments, there are the station platforms of Lanskaya railway station. The bridge was opened in 1869 and the first train proceeded through it on July 3 [O.S. June 22] 1869. The bridge was expanded in 1926.

== Station access ==
The platform of Lanskaya station, from the Saint Petersburg direction, is located on the embankment. Access to it is obtained from under the bridge.

== Memoirs ==
The bridge is mentioned in the memoir "March of 1917" by the novelist Aleksandr Solzhenitsyn.
