= Sherekinsky =

Rural locality in Kursk Oblast, Russia

Sherekinsky Шерекинский
- Settlement
- Interactive map of Sherekinsky
- Location of Sherekinsky Sherekinsky (Kursk Oblast)
- Coordinates: 51°44′13″N 35°16′21″E
- Country: Russia
- Federal subject: Kursk Oblast
- Administrative district: Lgovsky District
- SelsovietSelsoviet: Maritsky

Population (2010 Census)
  - Total: 125
  - Estimate (2010): 125 (0%)

Municipal status
  - Municipal district: Lgovsky Municipal District
  - Rural settlement: Maritsky Selsoviet Rural Settlement
- Time zone: UTC+3 (MSK)
- Postal code: 307705
- Dialing code: +7 47140
- OKTMO ID: 38622464131
- Website: marickiy.ru

Sherekinsky (Russian: Шерекинский) is a rural locality (a settlement) in Maritsky Selsoviet Rural Settlement, Lgovsky District, Kursk Oblast, Russia.

== Population ==
Population: 125 (2010 census); 157 (2002 census);

== Geography ==
The settlement is located 57.5 km from the Russia–Ukraine border, 63.5 km west of Kursk, 9 km north of the district center – the town Lgov, 2 km from the selsoviet center – Maritsa.

Climate

Sherekinsky has a warm-summer humid continental climate (Dfb in the Köppen climate classification).

== Transport ==
Sherekinsky is located 12 km from the road of regional importance 38K-017 (Kursk – Lgov – Rylsk – border with Ukraine) as part of the European route E38, on the road 38K-023 (Lgov – Konyshyovka), 1 km from the nearest (closed) railway halt 575 km (railway line Navlya – Lgov-Kiyevsky).

The rural locality is situated 70 km from Kursk Vostochny Airport, 151 km from Belgorod International Airport and 273 km from Voronezh Peter the Great Airport.
