= Pesochny =

Pesochny (masculine), Pesochnaya (feminine), or Pesochnoye (neuter) may refer to:

- Pesochny, Russia (Pesochnaya, Pesochnoye), several inhabited localities in Russia
- Pesochnaya, Kazakhstan, an inhabited locality in Atyrau Province, Kazakhstan
- Pesochnoye, Belarus, an agrotown in Minsk Region, Belarus
- Pesochnoye Urban Settlement, a former municipal formation in Rybinsky Municipal District of Yaroslavl Oblast, Russia demoted in status to that of a rural settlement in January 2012
