= Flyugov post =

Railway station in St. Petersburg, Russia

Flugov post Флю́гов Пост
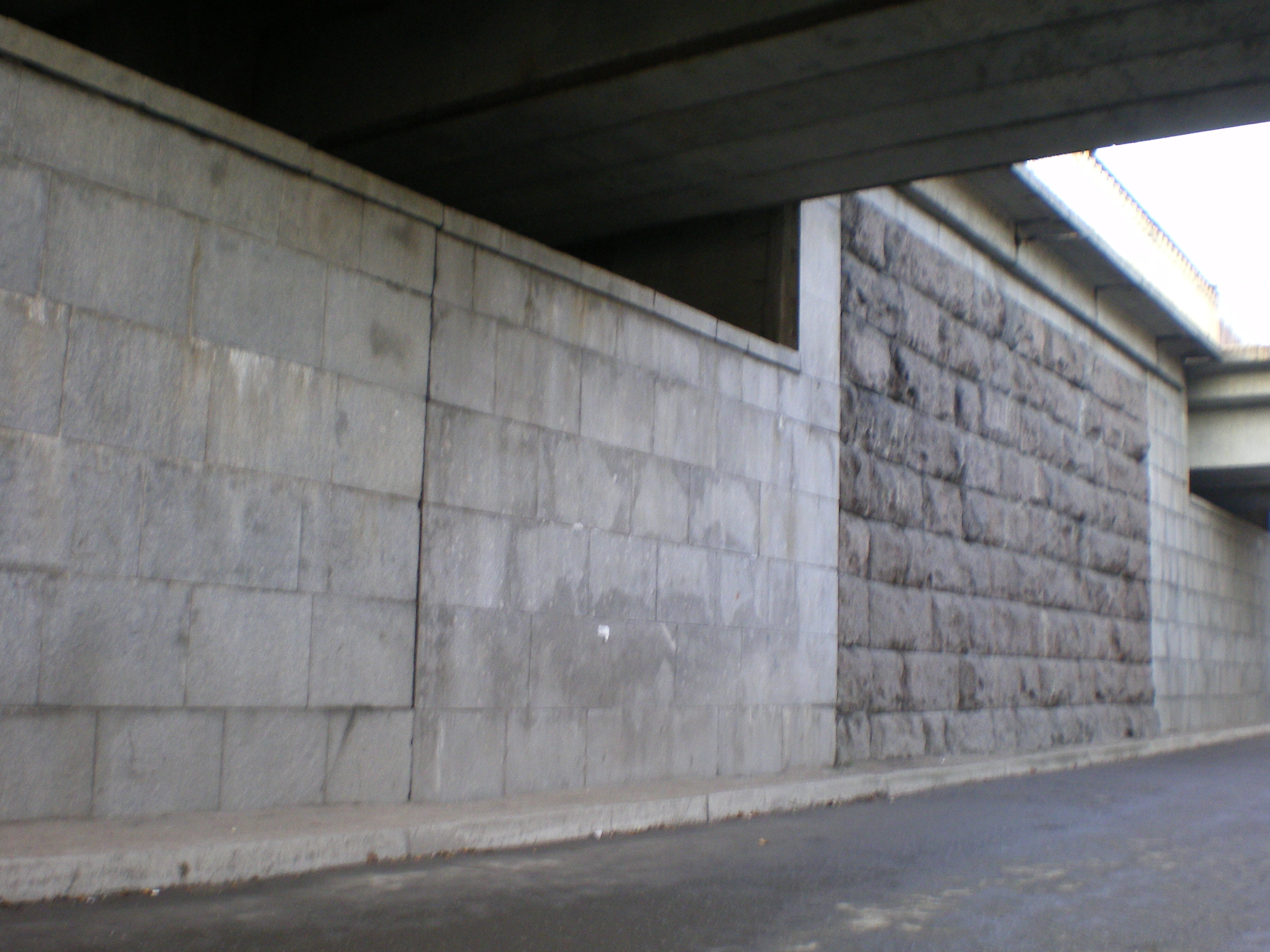
- Stone structure at Flugov post (railway station on the Vyborg line)

General information
- Other names: Flugov shunting loop
- Location: 80, B. Sampsonievsky Street; Saint Petersburg; Russia
- Coordinates: 59°59′07″N 30°20′00″E
- Tracks: 2

Construction
- Structure type: At-grade

Other information
- Status: Remain structures

History
- Opened: 1904 (Tovarnaya line); 1925 (Vyborg line)
- Closed: 1929 (Tovarnaya line); 1934 (Vyborg line)

Former services
Preceding station	Primorskaya Railway	Following station
Primorsky Terminus	Tovarnaya Line	Serdobolsky stop towards Finlyandsky Rail Terminal
Location

Flugov post (Russian: Флю́гов Пост) also known as Flugov shunting loop, was a goods station in Saint Petersburg, built for delivering cargo from tram stations on the Flugov lane (Rus. Флюгов переулок, now Kantemirovskaya street) to Sestroretsk.

== History ==
=== On Tovarnaya line ===
The station was constructed as a branch of the Primorsky Rail Terminal to Flugov Post line in May, 1904 by engineer Pyotr Alexandrovich Avenarius.

Catastrophic flooding on 23 September 1924 closed the Primorsky Rail Terminal. Another branch to the Finlyandsky Rail Terminal was constructed in 1925 and 1927. By 1926, the line to Sestroretsk had been laid through Lanskaya station. In 1929, the line was reconstructed. The station Flyugov post was no longer required and was dismantled.

=== On Vyborg line ===
Flyugov Post was also the name of a station on the line between Finlyandsky Rail Terminal and Lanskaya, constructed in 1925 and taken out of service in 1934.

== Picture gallery ==
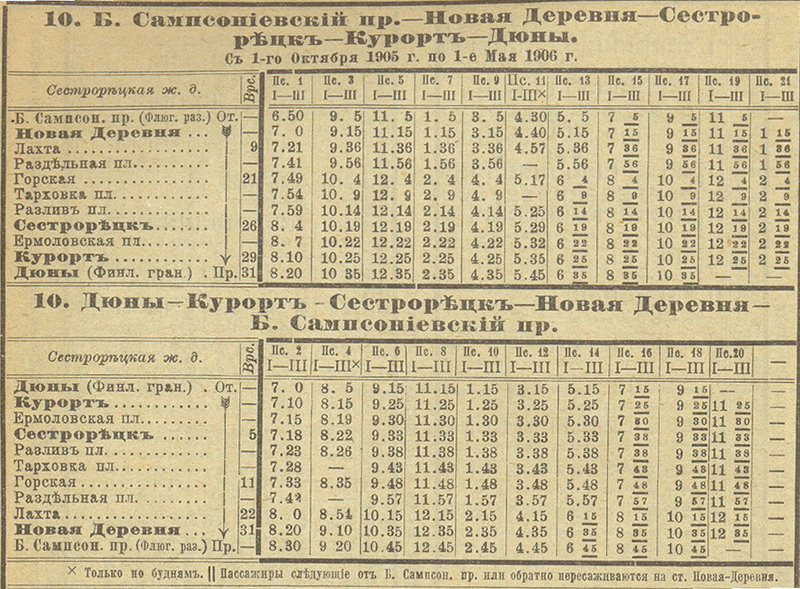
The schedule of the Sestroretsk direction in 1905.

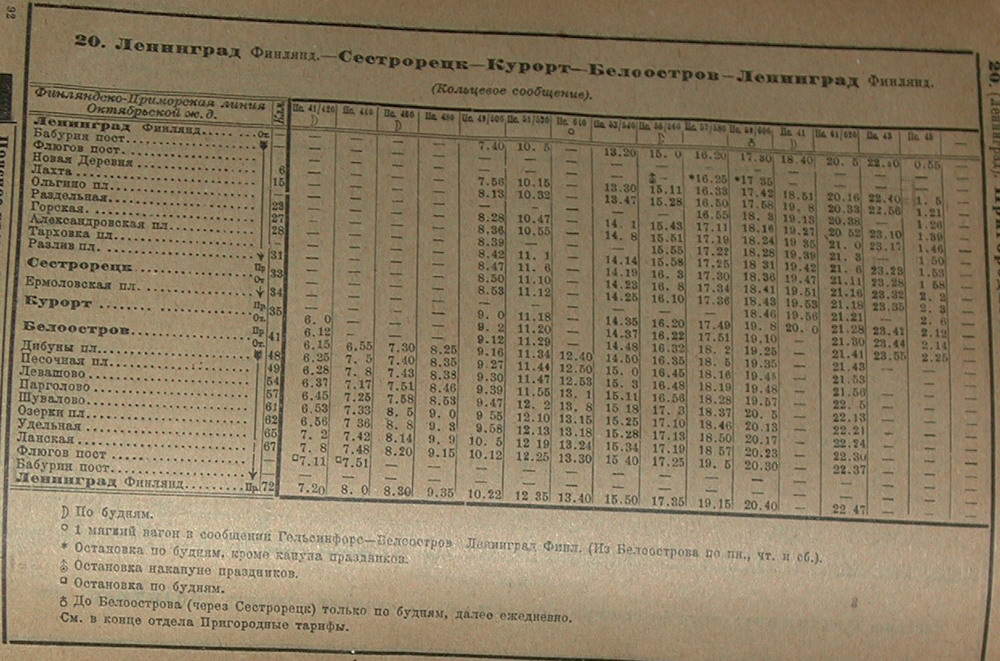
The schedule of the Sestroretsk direction in 1927

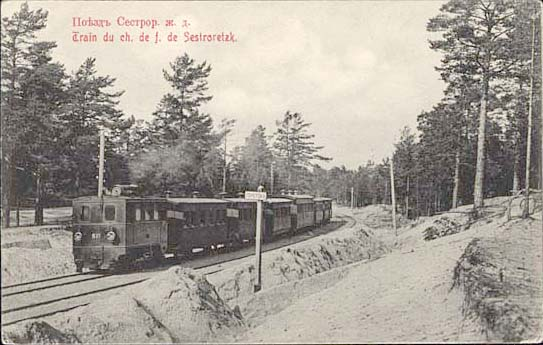
Train of the Seaside Sestroretsk railway. In operation at this station at this time

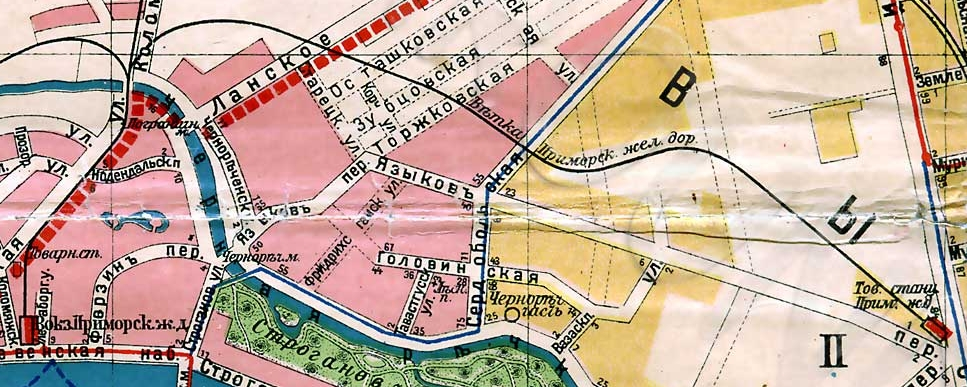
Plan of the Tovarnaya Line in 1916
