= Lensk (inhabited locality) =

Lensk (Russian: Ленск) is the name of several inhabited localities in Russia.

== Modern localities ==
Urban localities

- Lensk, a town in Lensky District of the Sakha Republic

Rural localities

- Lensk, Krasnoyarsk Krai, a village in Subbotinsky Selsoviet of Shushensky District in Krasnoyarsk Krai
- Lensk, Perm Krai, a selo in Kungursky District of Perm Krai

== Alternative names ==
- Lensk, alternative name of Lenskoye, a selo in Mosalsky District of Kaluga Oblast

== See also ==
- Lensky (disambiguation)
