= Volkovskaya railway station =

Railway station in St. Petersburg, Russia

Волковская Волковская
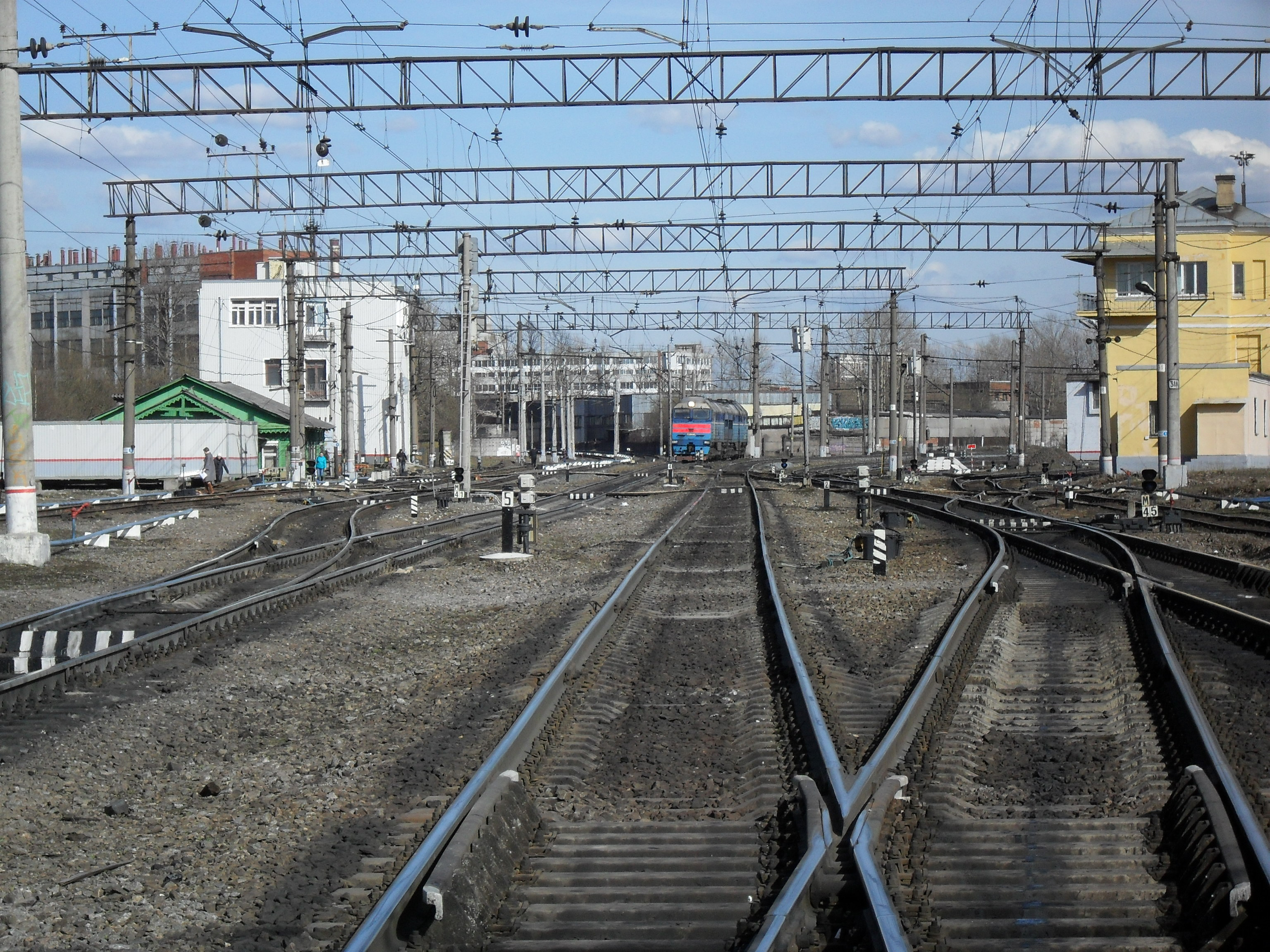
- Volkovskaya station in 2017, western part

General information
- Location: Russia
- Coordinates: 59.8939°N 30.3689°E
- Operator: RZD
- Line: Connecting Line

History
- Opened: 1900
- Electrified: ~1950s
Location

Volkovskaya (Волковская) railway station is a nodal railway station within Saint Petersburg railway system in Russia. It was created in 1900 in a historical location on the crossroads of several important railway lines ascending to initial formation of the whole Russia's railway network, where the Connecting Line and Putilovskaya Line had a joint section.

It has been generally used for freight distributing, but recent plans of city's railway network expansion suppose that it is transformed into a large passenger hub interconnecting with the nearby Volkovskaya metro station.

The name is after nearby village (in Russian).

== See also ==
- Tovarnaya line
