= Connecting Line =

Historical railway line in Saint Petersburg, Russia

Connecting Line / Putilovskaya Line
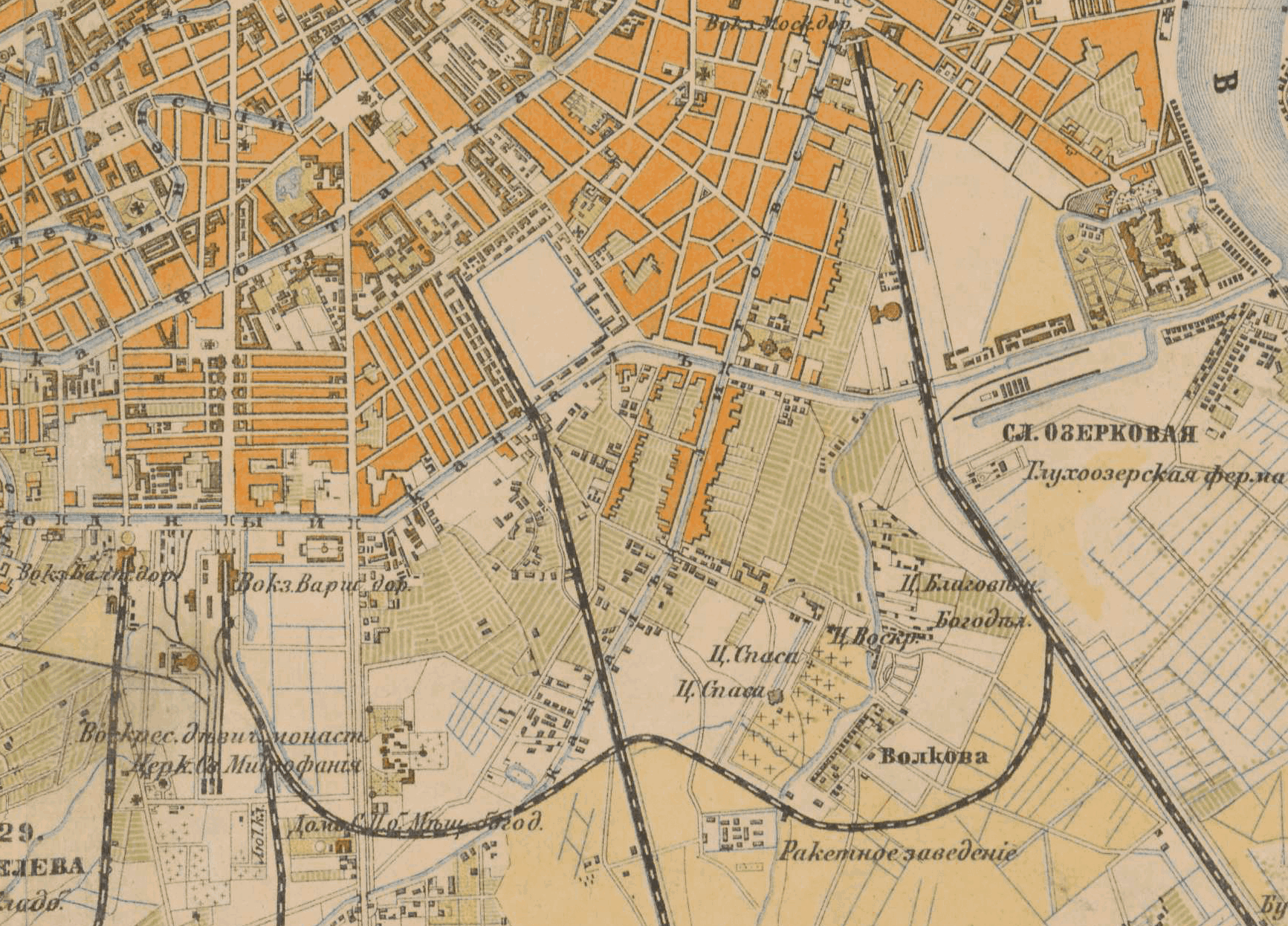
- The Connecting Line at a 1870s map (horizontal curved, connecting vertical straight)

Overview
- Native name: Соединительная ветвь / Путиловская ветвь

History
- Opened: 1854

Technical
- Line length: 4.73 km as Connecting, 16 km as Putilovskaya
- Track gauge: Russian gauge (1524 mm, later 1520 mm)

The Connecting Line (Russian: Соединительная ветвь, romanized: Soyedinitel'naya vetv') is a historical railway line in the southern part of Saint Petersburg, Russia, that may be considered the initial step in the process of forming a unified Russian railway network. It was constructed in 1853 and started operation in 1854. Before that, Russian railways consisted only of several separate lines connecting a few major cities. Decades later, in the first half of the 20th century, the line was merged with the later-built neighboring Putilovskaya Line (Путиловская ветвь), also known as the Port Line (Портовая ветвь), and was lengthened to the city's northern territories forming the so-called Northern Semi-Ring (Северное полукольцо) and the consequent massive Saint Petersburg railway hub.

== Premises ==
In the 19th century, Saint Petersburg was the capital of the Russian Empire and the residence of Russian tsars who aimed to develop the national economy and infrastructure. The first Russian railway of mass usage, the 27-kilometers Tsarskoye Selo Railway, was inaugurated in 1837 and connected the capital city with the suburban royal residency at the settlement of Tsarskoye Selo, nowadays known as Pushkin. For several years it was considered mainly a recreational object primarily for serving the imperial family's needs but was valuable as testing range for future railway development (special attention was paid to winter-time exploitation as Russian winters are considered to be especially cold and hard on mechanisms).

The efficiency of railways was proven and in 1845 the next Russian mass-usage railroad began to be operated – the Warsaw–Vienna railway in Congress Poland, which was a part of Russian Empire at the time. It was planned to be connected with the forming European railway network at Austrian-Russian border, and besides passengers it was prepared for transporting coal from Dąbrowa Basin. The road had commercial success, so Russia's rulers, headed by Nicholas I, decided to connect by railroad the two main Russian cities – Saint Petersburg and the former capital Moscow. This resulted in the creation of the Saint Petersburg–Moscow railway, entitled Nikolaevskaya, that started working in 1851 with the northern terminus at a place in Petersburg nowadays known as Moskovsky railway station.

In 1852, the separate Saint Petersburg–Warsaw railway began to be constructed with the northern terminus at a place in Petersburg later known as Varshavsky railway station, 4 kilometers to the west from Moskovsky station. Tsarskoye Selo railway terminus was located between them – nowadays known as Vitebsky railway station. Moscow and Warsaw railways were built with similar technologies and had a gauge of 1524 mm, later known as Russian gauge. The earlier "experimental" Tsarskoye Selo railway (Tsarskoselskaya) in the middle had broader gauge of 1829 mm so it was incompatible.

== Construction ==
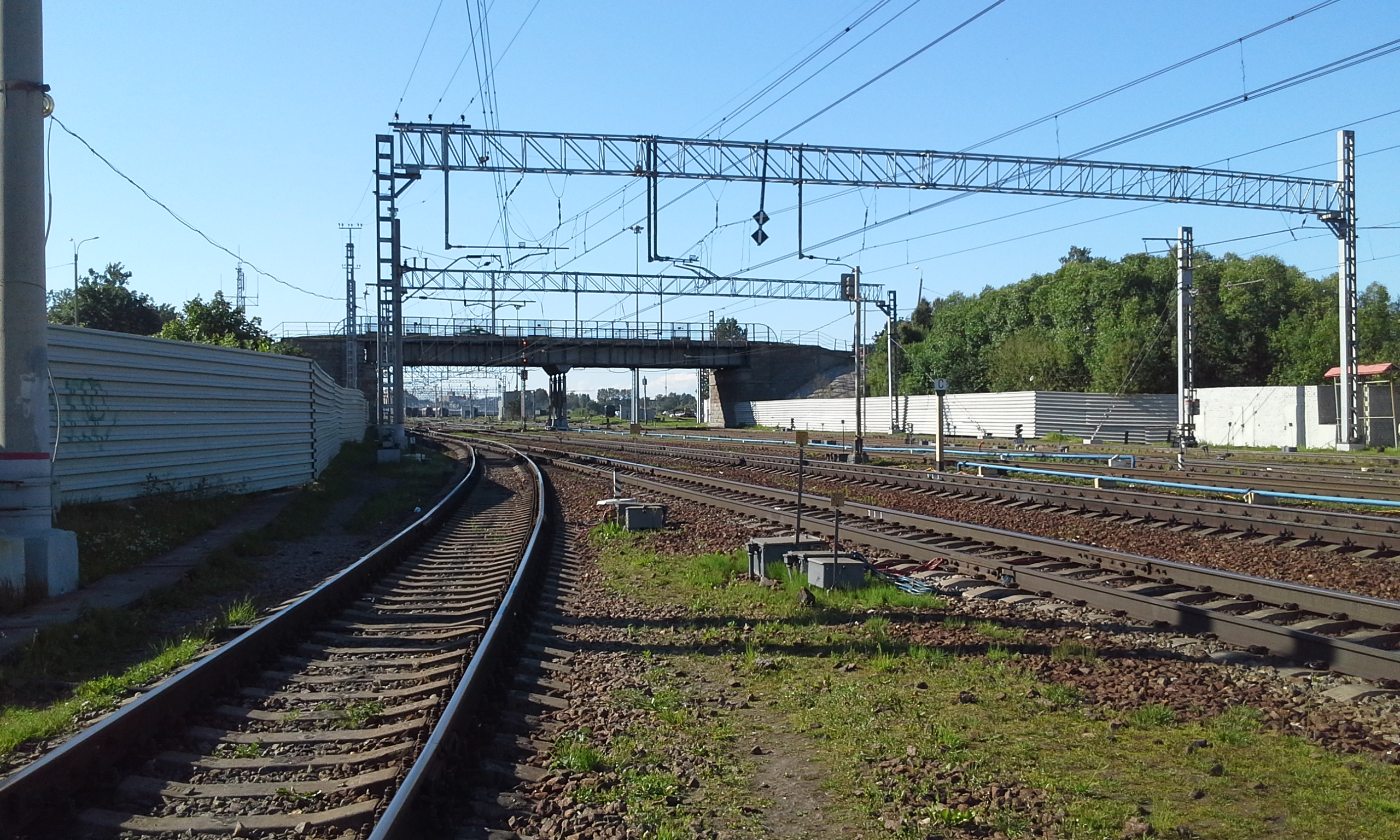
2019 photo of the point of the Line's beginning

Saint Petersburg was founded in the 17th century by Peter the Great and was made the capital by him to serve as Russia's main sea and river port (Peter also invested heavily in creation of Imperial Russian Navy). Sea and river cargo transfers were largely used and were dominating in massive cargo movements. In 1800s Saint Petersburg seaport became a large cargo hub and with appearance of railways cargo transfers began to relocate to railways to reach inland destinations. The abovementioned Moscow and Warsaw railways began transferring cargo that also was circulating to the seaport using horses. So, the planned Connecting Line was meant to connect the two for cargo purposes with no plans of passenger movement.

The single-track line was planned by Russian government and was 4.73 kilometers in length. Construction went during 1853 and finished in 1854. Seven wooden bridges were built along the way.

In the middle of the route there had to be a crossing of the Tsarskoselskaya railway. It had no cargo traffic, had other gauge width, and no connection with it was intended. The crossing was implemented as the same-level perpendicular overlapping of the tracks. Also, the latitudinal Connecting Line path had a significant curve to the north at the point of crossing (see 1870s map above): this was because of the nearby Rocket Range (later known as Aeronautical Park), which was a military firing range and thus unsuitable for a civilian railway. With the development of railroad operations, train traffic grew up and by 1870 a "half-station" called Kresty ("the crosses") was organized at the crossing point. Its purpose was to prevent perpendicularly moving trains from collision and to distribute cargo carriages. It turned out that the mentioned curve was not suitable for longer freight trains so Kresty station was used to separate them into parts. This was the first dedicated non-passenger station within the growing and developing network of the whole country.

== Putilovskaya Line ==
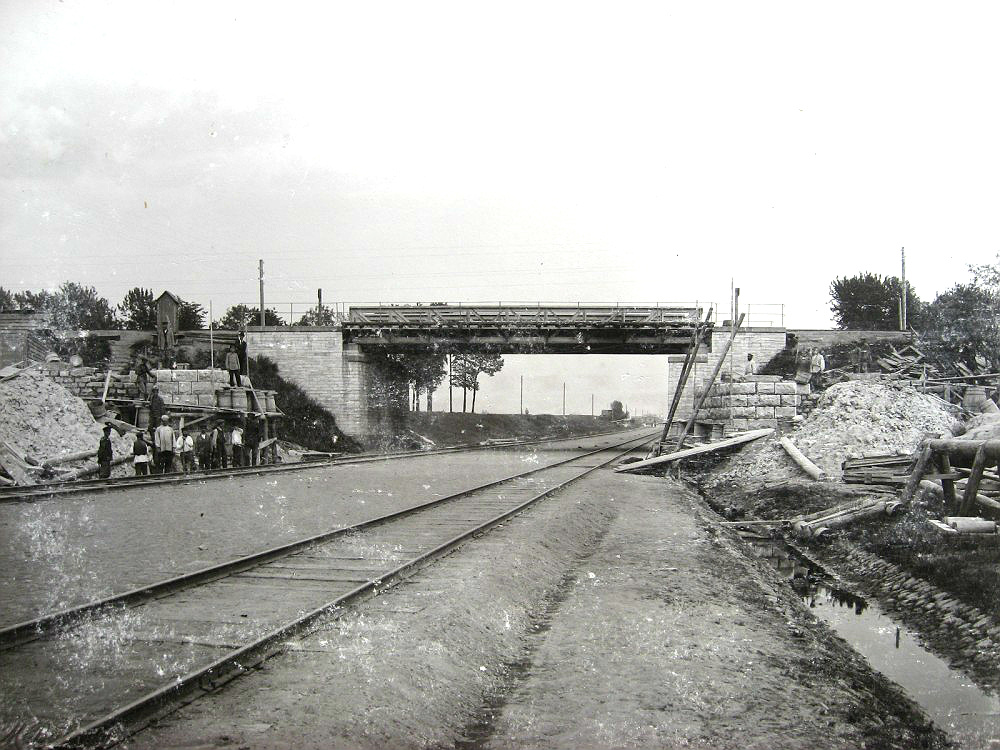
Joint Putilovskaya-Connecting lines under the Tsarskoselskaya-Vitebskaya bridge in about 1900

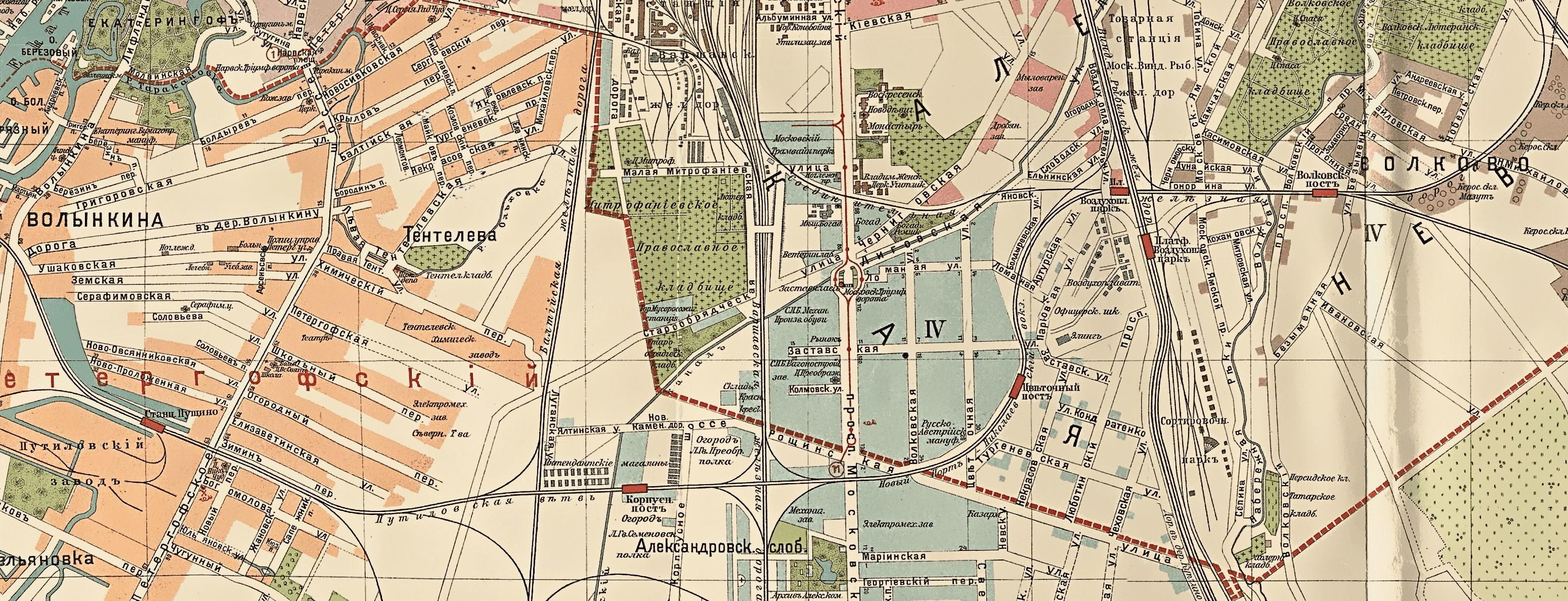
Central parts of both Connecting and Putilovskaya lines on a 1912 map during period of merging

In 1875–1885, with the expansion of the seaport, the "Sea Channel" was dug through shallow Gulf of Finland to allow bigger ships arrive from the Baltic Sea. This led to creation of the New Port of the city at the gulf shore while the older port was located in the city center within the Neva river delta. With the foundation of the New Port, a railway was constructed there for cargo reloading. The railway began to be known as the Port Line, or Putilovskaya Line, after major industrialist Nikolay Putilov, who is considered to be the main creator both of the New Port and the new railway line.

Putilov was the owner of the massive steel and machinery plant, founded in 1789, that is located on the same shore and had a big demand for transportation services. By the end of the 1860s its production included rails and other railway parts. In 1869 Putilov asked the imperial government to allow construction of a new railway line to connect his factory with existing water and railroad cargo hubs within the city. These included several cargo piers and cargo distribution centers at the railroad lines. By that time, a new railway line existed nearby: the Petergof line, parallel to the previous lines. Its terminus was located slightly to the West from the Varshavsky terminus and is nowadays known as Baltiysky railway station. It started working in 1857 and initially was also mainly a royal transport for travelling to Peterhof Palace, but used a then-standard Russian gauge and was gradually becoming a new mass-usage passenger and cargo line with vast plans of extension.

Putilov's demand led to governmental studies of the possibility for interconnection between the railways (two of them were already connected, as told above). In 1870 the emperor Alexander II allowed construction and the planning works began. The path was intended to connect the industrial and transport objects at the sea shore to the ones at the inner Neva River coast on the approach to the city. The city and its industry were growing and multiple objects of economy were appearing across the territory that began to have some industrial spur-type connections with railway lines. Conceptually, the path for the new railway followed the path of the Obvodny Canal, which had been built in 1769 for similar purposes but had turned out to be too shallow and narrow for the growing demand. The future Port Line was initially planned to have at least two its own steam locomotives and 60 cargo cars.

The eastern part of the new line partially coincided with the existing Connecting Line while the railroad authorities were seeking to eliminate its unsuitable curve during 1875. The Rocket Range was relocated and a straightened route was drawn through it for Putilovskaya Line, with the intention to construct a bridge under Tsarskoselskaya line to avoid a level crossing. This allowed optimization of the Connecting Line with elimination of the problematic Kresty station. The Putilovskaya Line was built from 1878 to 1880 and was inaugurated in 1881. A new stretch of the Connecting Line was laid along in parallel, running under the bridge, but the two lines were still separate structures. The curve remained until 1886 when it was dismantled together with the Kresty station.

Connections with the needed main lines were constructed, and the term "connecting line" («соединительная ветвь»), initially meant as the proper name for the original line, became a nominal common term at Russian Railways for any future "connecting lines" and is now widely used. Spur lines multiplied, Tsarskoselskaya line became Vitebskaya line and was converted into Russian gauge in 1900. In the same year, Volkovskaya railway station was founded at the common stretch between Vitebsk and Moscow lines that later became an important local hub for cargo trains distribution.

== 20th-century railway hub ==
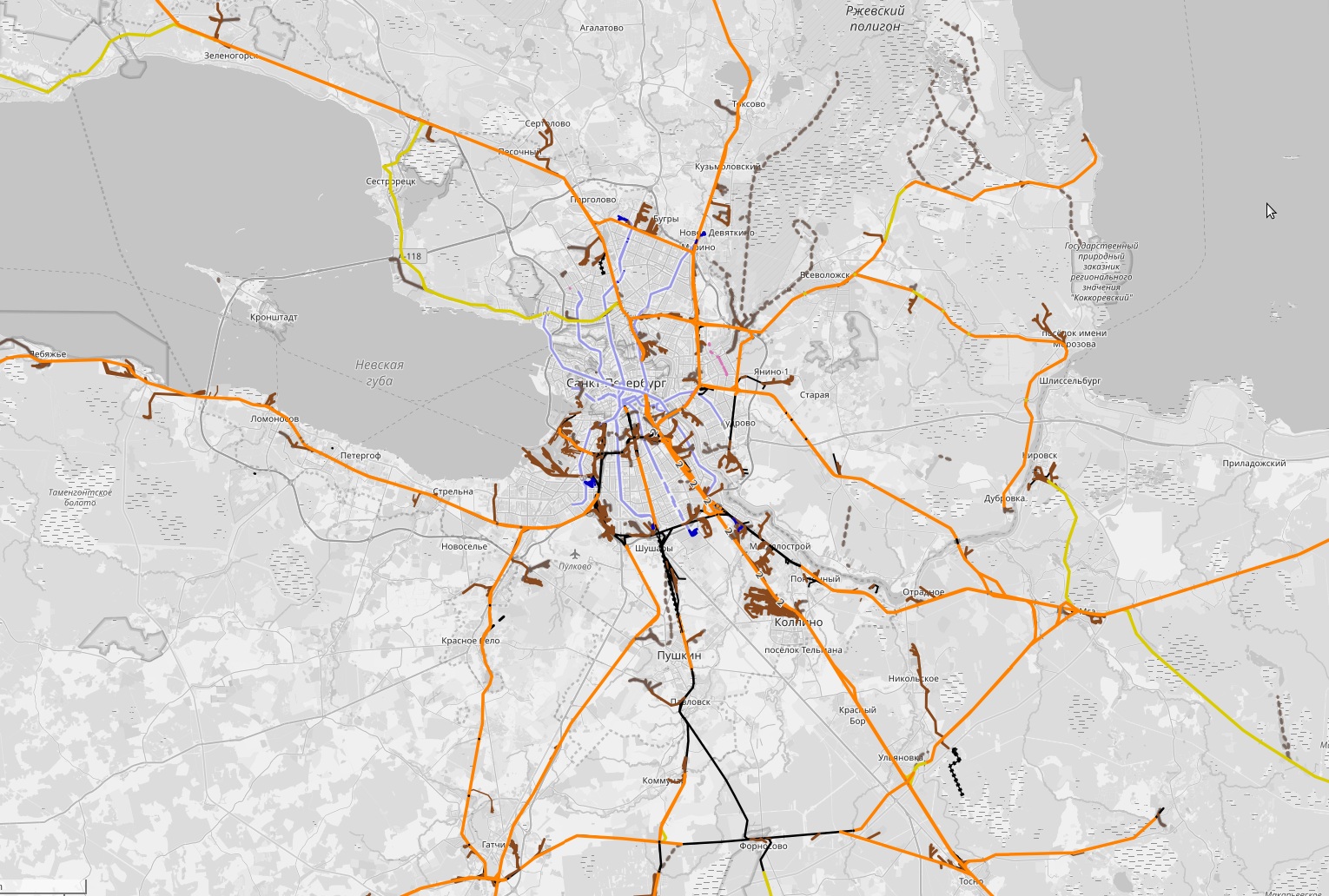
General structure of Saint Petersburg railway hub in 21st century as seen at OpenRailwayMap (OpenStreetMap)

The railway complex continued to grow with the massive industrialization of Russian Empire on the edge of centuries. New long-distance railway lines appeared on the opposite shore of Neva River heading to the then-Russian Grand Duchy of Finland and other northern and northeastern territories. This demanded the unification of all possible railway connections within Petersburg and led to construction of the Finland Railway Bridge in 1913, which in fact was an extension of the Putilovskaya Line and the beginning of forming a "semi-ring" around the city center. World War I and the Russian Revolution heavily influenced railroads in Russia, the significance of which became comparable to significance of the circulatory system for a human body.

In the meantime, the eliminated curve was not the Connecting Line's sole problem. While still remaining separate structures with the Putilovskaya Line, after common parallel stretch to the west, the two lines separated right after the bridge and the Connecting Line was still heading to Varshavsky freight yard. On the way, it was crossing with the major road nowadays known as Moskovsky Avenue. It ran almost strictly along the Pulkovo meridian straight from north to south and grew heavy traffic with popular tram lines on it. On 3 December 1930, a freight train moving on the Connecting Line collided with an overcrowded tram that lead to 28 deaths and 19 injuries. Shortly the crossing was closed and the train movements were cancelled at the stretch.

The Putilovskaya Line crosses the avenue 1.3 kilometers to the south via an overpass, and so train traffic was fully relocated there. By the end of 1930s, the disastrous crossing with surrounding tracks was eliminated and the original Connecting Line ceased to exist.

== See also ==
- Primorskaya Line
