= Lensky District =

Location of Arkhangelsk Oblast in Russia

Location of the Sakha Republic in Russia

Lensky District is the name of several administrative and municipal districts in Russia:

- Lensky District, Arkhangelsk Oblast, an administrative and municipal district of Arkhangelsk Oblast
- Lensky District, Sakha Republic, an administrative and municipal district of the Sakha Republic

== See also ==
- Lensky (disambiguation)
