= Lensky (rural locality) =

Lensky (Russian: Ле́нский; masculine), Lenskaya (Ле́нская; feminine), or Lenskoye (Ле́нское; neuter) is the name of several rural localities in Russia.

== Modern inhabited localities ==
- Lensky, Altai Krai, a settlement in Lukovsky Selsoviet of Pankrushikhinsky District of Altai Krai
- Lenskoye, a village in Babyninsky District of Kaluga Oblast
- Lenskaya, a village in Mekhonsky Selsoviet of Shatrovsky District of Kurgan Oblast

== Abolished inhabited localities ==
- Lensky, Bryansk Oblast, a settlement in Ponurovsky Selsoviet of Starodubsky District of Bryansk Oblast; abolished in May 2010
