= Lensky =

Lensky (masculine), Lenskaya (feminine), or Lenskoye (neuter) may refer to:

== People with the surname ==
- Aleksandr Pavlovich Lensky (1847–1908), Russian actor
- Arno von Lenski (1893–1986), German general
- Dmitry Lensky (1805–1860), nom de plume of D. Vorobyov, Russian comic actor
- Gerhard Lenski (1924–2015), American sociologist
- Haim Lensky (1905–1943), Russian Hebrew-language poet
- Irina Lenskiy (Lenskaya) (born 1971), Israeli athlete
- Jacob Lensky (born 1988), Canadian soccer player
- Lois Lenski (1893–1974), American children fiction writer
- Richard C. H. Lenski (1864–1936), German-American Lutheran scholar and author
- Richard Lenski (born 1956), American evolutionary biologist
- Simon Lenski, Belgian cello player of the band DAAU
- Julian Leszczyński (1889–1939), Polish communist activist, used the name Leński
- Vladimir Lensky, a character in Eugene Onegin

== Places ==
- Lensky District, several districts in Russia
- Lensky (rural locality) (Lenskaya, Lenskoye), several rural localities in Russia

== See also ==
- Lansky (disambiguation)
