= Pesochny, Belgorod Oblast =

Pesochny Песочный
- Khutor
- Location within Belgorod Oblast Location within Russia
- Coordinates: 51°09′N 37°53′E
- Country: Russia
- Region: Belgorod Oblast
- District: Starooskolsky District
- Time zone: UTC+3:00

Pesochny (Russian: Песочный) is a rural locality (a khutor) in Starooskolsky District, Belgorod Oblast, Russia. The population was 11 as of 2010. Pesochny has only one street.

== Geography ==
Pesochny is located 18 km south of Stary Oskol (the district's administrative centre) by road. Novikovo is the nearest rural locality.
