= 1869 in rail transport =

This article lists events related to rail transport that occurred in 1869.

== Events ==
=== January events ===
- January 9 – Government of India resolves not to create new guaranteed railway companies, thus determining future relationships between private enterprise and state in railway development.
- January 23 – George Westinghouse files for a patent on his air brake; this year also he founds the Westinghouse Air Brake Company ("WABCO").

=== February events ===
- February 17 – Henry Keyes succeeds Henry C. Lord as president of the Atchison, Topeka and Santa Fe Railway.
- February 27 – The first line of what is now Athens Metro, in Greece, opens as Athens Piraeus Railway SA, the first railroad in the country (8.8 km).

=== March events ===
- March – By an act of Congress, the Kansas Pacific Railway's name is shortened to Kansas Pacific.

=== April events ===
- April 6 – The Lake Shore and Michigan Southern Railway is formed through merger of the Michigan Southern and Northern Indiana Railroad and the Lake Shore Railway.
- April 23 – Crews building the Central Pacific Railroad lay 10 miles (16 km) of track in one day.
- April 26 – The Atchison, Topeka and Santa Fe Railroad opens its first segment of track (6 miles / 10 km long) between Topeka and Pauline, Kansas.
- April 28 – Franklin B. Gowen becomes president of the Philadelphia and Reading Railroad.

=== May events ===
- May 10 – The golden spike is driven at Promontory Summit, Utah, on the First transcontinental railroad in North America.
- May 15 – The first trains operate the entire length of the First transcontinental railroad in North America traveling between Omaha, Nebraska, and Sacramento, California.

=== June events ===
- June 1 – The Merchants Despatch is reformed as a joint stock trading company, with ownership divided among the Cleveland, Columbus, Cincinnati and Indianapolis Railway (CCC&I), the Lake Shore and Michigan Southern Railway, and the New York Central Railroad (NYC), all part of the Cornelius Vanderbilt rail empire.
- June 17 – The Atchison, Topeka and Santa Fe Railroad, building westward from Topeka, reaches Carbondale, Kansas.

=== July events ===
- July 3
  - Hannibal and St. Joseph Railroad subsidiary Kansas City and Cameron Railroad opens the Hannibal Bridge, the first railroad bridge across the Missouri River, connecting its namesake cities.
  - Completion of the Mount Washington Cog Railway in New Hampshire, U.S., the world's first mountain rack railway.
  - Riihimäki – Saint Petersburg Railway line in the Grand Duchy of Finland completed from the Finland Station in Saint Petersburg to Zelenogorsk. Stations opened at Lanskaya, Udelnaya, Ozerki, Pargolovo, Pesochny, Levashovo, Beloostrov, Solnechnoye, Repino, Komarovo and Zelenogorsk.

=== August events ===
- August 18 – The Windsor and Annapolis Railway in Nova Scotia officially opens between Annapolis and Grand Pre.

=== September events ===
- September 13 – The Solway Junction Railway is opened for iron ore traffic, including a 1-mile 8 chain (1.8 km) iron girder viaduct across the Solway Firth in Scotland.
- September 21 – The Lake Shore and Michigan Southern Railway leases the Kalamazoo, Allegan and Grand Rapids Railway in Michigan.

=== October events ===
- 10 October – A branch of the West Coast Main Line to Liverpool Lime Street, is opened by the London and North Western Railway, from Weaver Junction north of Crewe to Ditton Junction via the Runcorn Railway Bridge over the River Mersey, bypassing the earlier Liverpool and Manchester line.

=== November events ===
- November 8 – The Central Pacific Railroad completes the final leg of the First transcontinental railroad in North America, connecting Sacramento, California, to San Francisco, California.
- November 11 – After the New York and Erie Railroad moves its primary shop facilities from Dunkirk, New York, to Buffalo, Horatio G. Brooks leases the facilities in Dunkirk and opens Brooks Locomotive Works.
- November 22 – The Ft. Wayne, Jackson and Saginaw Railroad opens between Jackson and Reading, Michigan.

=== December events ===
- December – Newly founded Brooks Locomotive Works completes construction of the company's first steam locomotive; it is included in an order for the New York and Erie Railroad.

=== Unknown date events ===
- The New York State Legislature authorised the merger of railroads already owned by Cornelius Vanderbilt into the New York Central, including the Lake Shore and Michigan Southern Railway, the Canada Southern Railroad and the Michigan Central Railroad into the New York Central and Hudson River Railroad.
- William Henry Vanderbilt, son of Cornelius Vanderbilt, is promoted to Vice President of the New York Central and Hudson River Railroad.
- The first railroad built in New Jersey, the Camden and Amboy Railroad, is merged into the United New Jersey Railroad and Canal Company.
- Wells and French Company, later to become part of American Car and Foundry, is founded in Chicago, Illinois.
- Construction begins on the central pontifical railroad station in Rome, Italy.

== Births ==
=== June births ===
- June 8 – William R. Coe, chief executive officer of Virginian Railway during World War II (d. 1955).

=== July births ===
- July 24 – Julius Dorpmüller, German railway administrator (d. 1945).

=== August births ===
- August 11 – Hale Holden, president of Chicago, Burlington and Quincy Railroad 1914–1918 and 1920–1929, chairman of the board of directors for Southern Pacific Railroad 1932–1939, is born (d. 1940).

=== November births ===
- November 9 - Charles Donnelly, president of Northern Pacific Railway 1920–1939, is born (d. 1939).
