= Lensky, Altai Krai =

Lensky Ленский
- Settlement
- Location within Altai Krai Location within Russia
- Coordinates: 54°00′N 80°08′E
- Country: Russia
- Region: Altai Krai
- District: Pankrushikhinsky District
- Time zone: UTC+7:00

Lensky (Russian: Ленский) is a rural locality (a settlement) in Lukovsky Selsoviet, Pankrushikhinsky District, Altai Krai, Russia. The population was 217 in 2013. There are two streets.

== Geography ==
Lensky is located 27 km northwest of Pankrushikha (the district's administrative centre) by road. Petrovsky is the nearest rural locality.
