= Pesochnoye, Vologda Oblast =

Pesochnoye Песочное
- Settlement
- Location within Vologda Oblast Location within Russia
- Coordinates: 59°26′N 39°39′E
- Country: Russia
- Region: Vologda Oblast
- District: Vologodsky District
- Time zone: UTC+3:00

Pesochnoye (Russian: Песочное) is a rural locality (a settlement) in Kubenskoye Rural Settlement, Vologodsky District, Vologda Oblast, Russia. The population was 6 as of 2002. There are 8 streets.

== Geography ==
Pesochnoye is located 33 km northwest of Vologda (the district's administrative centre) by road. Irkhino is the nearest rural locality.
