= Pulkovo meridian =

Coordinates: 59.7717°N 30.3261°E

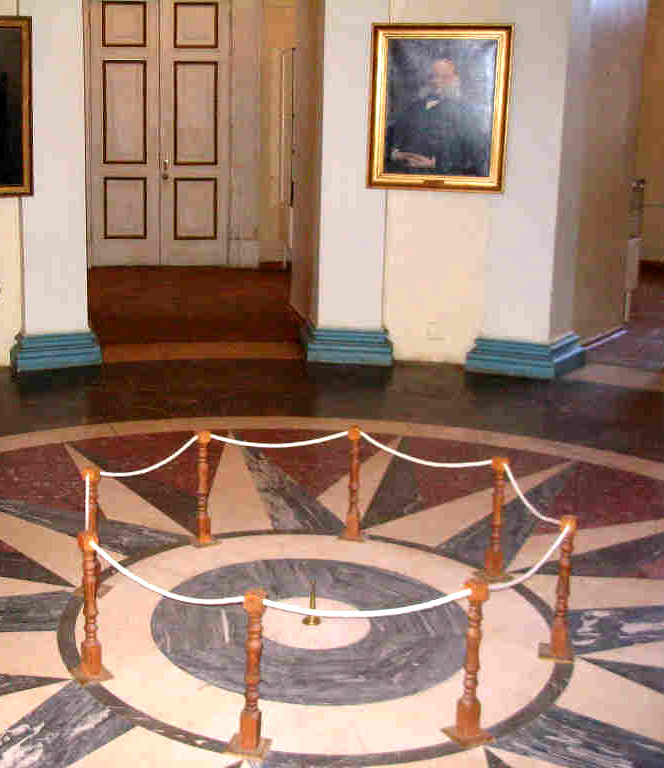
The zero-point of the Pulkovo meridian in the Round hall of the Pulkovo observatory

The Pulkovo meridian, which passes through the center of the main building of the Pulkovo Observatory and is at 30°19′34″ east of Greenwich, was the point of departure for all former geographical maps of Russia.

This meridian was used as the reference in the Russian Empire before the Prime meridian (Greenwich).

== See also ==
- Prime meridian#List of historic prime meridians on Earth
