= Pesochnoye, Vladimir Oblast =

Pesochnoye Песочное
- Village
- Location within Vladimir Oblast Location within Russia
- Coordinates: 56°23′N 40°39′E
- Country: Russia
- Region: Vladimir Oblast
- District: Suzdalsky District
- Time zone: UTC+3:00

Pesochnoye (Russian: Песочное) is a rural locality (a village) in Seletskoye Rural Settlement, Suzdalsky District, Vladimir Oblast, Russia. The population was 20 as of 2010. There are 4 streets.

== Geography ==
Pesochnoye is located on the Uyechka River, 15 km southeast of Suzdal (the district's administrative centre) by road. Prudy is the nearest rural locality.
