= Krasnaya Dubrava, Lgovsky District, Kursk Oblast =

Rural locality in Kursk Oblast, Russia

Krasnaya Dubrava Красная Дубрава
- Khutor
- Interactive map of Krasnaya Dubrava
- Location of Krasnaya Dubrava Krasnaya Dubrava (Kursk Oblast)
- Coordinates: 51°47′29″N 35°18′47″E
- Country: Russia
- Federal subject: Kursk Oblast
- Administrative district: Lgovsky District
- SelsovietSelsoviet: Maritsky

Population (2010 Census)
  - Total: 39
  - Estimate (2010): 39 (0%)

Municipal status
  - Municipal district: Lgovsky Municipal District
  - Rural settlement: Maritsky Selsoviet Rural Settlement
- Time zone: UTC+3 (MSK)
- Postal code: 307705
- Dialing code: +7 47140
- OKTMO ID: 38622464106
- Website: marickiy.ru

Krasnaya Dubrava (Russian: Красная Дубрава) is a rural locality (a khutor) in Maritsky Selsoviet Rural Settlement, Lgovsky District, Kursk Oblast, Russia. Population: 39 (2010 census); 54 (2002 census);

== Geography ==
The khutor is located in the Prutishche River basin (in the basin of the Seym), 64 km from the Russia–Ukraine border, 61 km north-west of Kursk, 15.5 km north-east of the district center – the town Lgov, 5.5 km from the selsoviet center – Maritsa.

Climate

Krasnaya Dubrava has a warm-summer humid continental climate (Dfb in the Köppen climate classification).

== Transport ==
Krasnaya Dubrava is located 18 km from the road of regional importance 38K-017 (Kursk – Lgov – Rylsk – border with Ukraine) as part of the European route E38, 5 km from the road 38K-023 (Lgov – Konyshyovka), 17 km from the road of intermunicipal significance 38H-362 (38K-017 – Nikolayevka – Shirkovo), 3.5 km from the road 38H-437 (38K-023 – Olshanka – Marmyzhi – 38N-362), on the road 38H-434 (38N-437 – Krasnaya Dubrava), 0.5 km from the nearest railway halt 565 km (railway line Navlya – Lgov-Kiyevsky).

The rural locality is situated 67 km from Kursk Vostochny Airport, 153 km from Belgorod International Airport and 270 km from Voronezh Peter the Great Airport.
