= Lanskaya electric substation =

Electric substation of Lanskaya railway station in Russia

Coordinates: 59.9953°N 30.3254°E

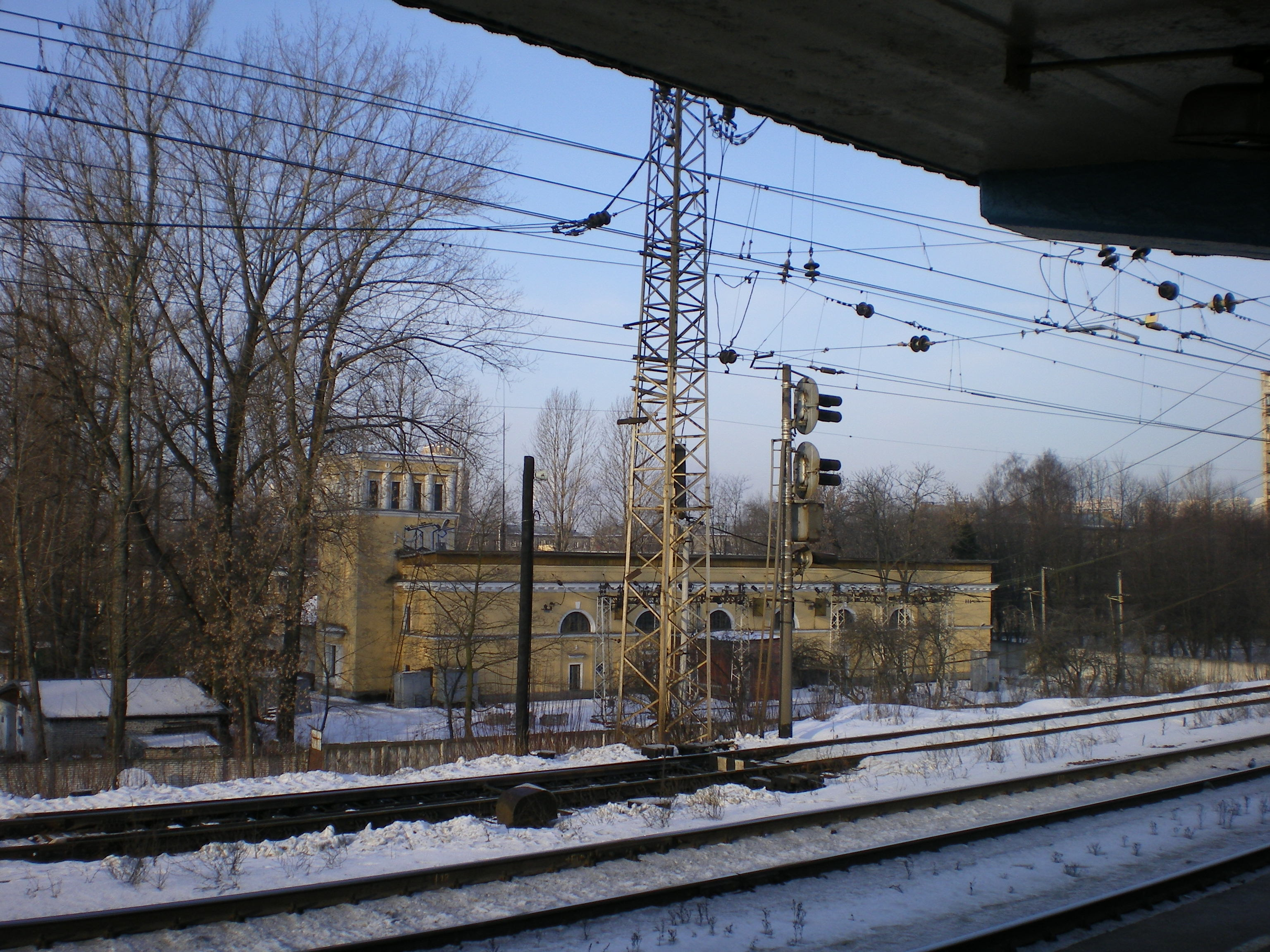
Substation at winter morning in 2009

The Lansky substation was the first electrical substation constructed on the Finlyandsky Rail direct of Saint Peterburg, Russia. It is located within Lanskaya station.

In the early 1950s the electric substation was built behind the station. The project building, in the style of Socialist Classicism, is a low squat building crowned by a small turret with a spire. Electrification of a site of road has begun with a direction Leningrad-Zelenogorsk (now it is a part of direct Saint Petersburg Finlyandsky-Vyborg) in 1951. The direction on station Finlyandsky Rail Terminal and Udelnaya station been electrified.

On 4 August 1951 at 0130 hours an electric-power dispatcher gave the command to bring up the current in the contact network of the first electrified in the Karelian Isthmus area Leningrad – Zelenogorsk. In 1 hour 50 minutes en route to a trial trip off the first electric train.

For the building of a high-speed rail line between Saint Petersburg (Finlyandsky Rail Terminal) and Helsinki station (see Karelian Trains) it is planned to modernise in 2009. After the end of works service of substations will be made remote-acting.
