= Lansky (surname) =

Lansky or Lanskaya is a surname. Notable people with the surname include:

== Lansky ==
- Aaron Lansky (born 1955), Yiddish book center organizer
- Greg Lansky (born 1982), Jewish French adult film producer
- Ida Lansky (1910–1997), American photographer
- Jake Lansky, American gangster
- Meyer Lansky (1902–1983), American gangster
- Paul Lansky (born 1944), American composer

== Lanskaya ==
- Alyona Lanskaya (born 1985), Belarusian singer
- Natalia Pushkina-Lanskaya (1812–1863), wife of Russian poet Alexander Pushkin
- Yelena Lanskaya, American film director, producer, and editor

== Fictional characters ==
- Lightmaster, Comic book villain whose actual name is Dr. Edward Lansky
