= Pesochnaya, Russia =

Pesochnaya Песочная
- Village
- Location within Vladimir Oblast Location within Russia
- Coordinates: 56°17′N 38°34′E
- Country: Russia
- Region: Vladimir Oblast
- District: Alexandrovsky District
- Time zone: UTC+3:00

Pesochnaya (Russian: Песочная) is a rural locality (a village) in Karinskoye Rural Settlement, Alexandrovsky District, Vladimir Oblast, Russia. The population was 3 as of 2010. There are 3 streets.

== Geography ==
Pesochnaya is located on the Molokcha River, 32 km southwest of Alexandrov (the district's administrative centre) by road. Perematkino is the nearest rural locality.
