= Lanskaya railway station =

Railway station in St. Petersburg, Russia

Lanskaya Ланская
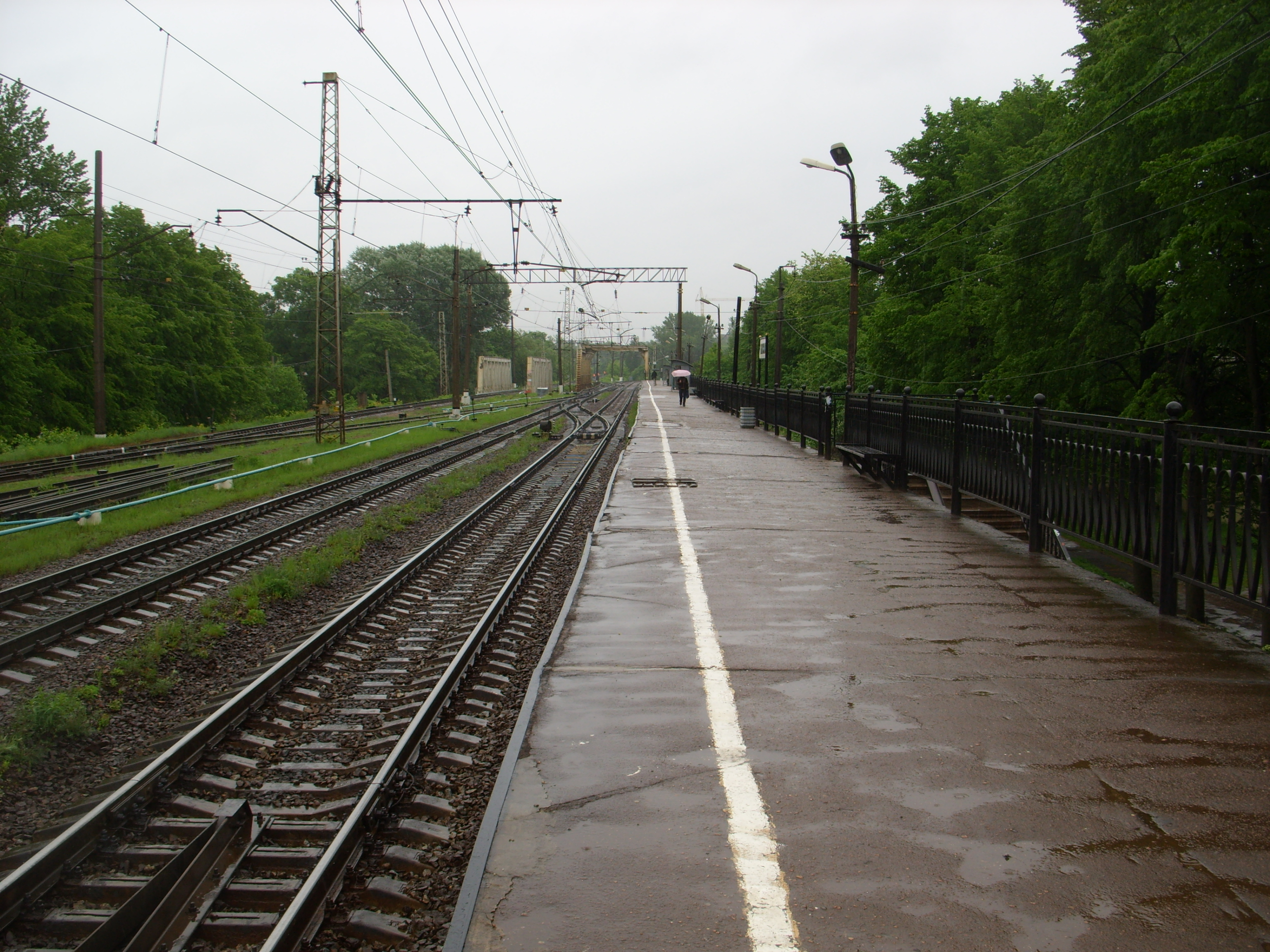
- Lanskaya railway platform

General information
- Location: 3, Serdobolskaya street Saint Petersburg; Russia
- Coordinates: 59°59′38″N 30°19′38″E
- Owner: Russian Railways
- Operator: October Railway
- Line: Saint Petersburg Railway Division
- Platforms: 2
- Tracks: 4

Other information
- Station code: 03821
- Fare zone: 1

History
- Opened: 1869
- Rebuilt: 1910
- Electrified: 1951

Services
Preceding station	Russian Railways	Following station
Udelnaya towards Riihimäki	Riihimäki–Saint Petersburg	Saint Petersburg–Finlyandsky Terminus
Novaya Derevnya towards Beloostrov	Saint Petersburg–Beloostrov	Saint Petersburg–Finlyandsky Terminus
Former services
Preceding station	October Railway	Following station
Novaya Derevnya towards Beloostrov	Saint Petersburg Finlyandsky–Beloostrov through Sestroretsk	Flyugov post towards Saint Petersburg–Finlyandsky
Location

Lanskaya railway station (Russian: Ланская железнодорожная станция) is a railway station in St. Petersburg, Russia located between Serdobolskaya street and Bolshoi Sampsonievsky street. It was named after the historical district of Saint Petersburg.

== History ==
The first wooden station building was constructed in 1869 by architect Wolmar Westling. The first train has solemnly proceeded through it on July 3 [O.S. June 22] 1869. It has been located a little in the heart of building and before it there was a place for transport. The facilities is located to the address 3, Serdobolskaya street. Through movement on all extent of a line between two capitals was opened personally by emperor Alexander II on September 12 [O.S. August 30] 1870.

The station building was rebuilt in stone in 1910 by architect Bruno Granholm as a four-storeyed building, which was designed in the rational branch of the “new style” of architecture at the beginning of the 20th century; an architectural style also known as a Romantic nationalism. The annexe leant to a high railway embankment, it looks extremely ascetical. The window openings are whimsically scattered on the exterior surface of the walls, and reflect the internal structure of the building.

=== The station during the Soviet period ===
The Saint Petersburg Finlyandsky–Vyborg line and Saint Petersburg Finlyandsky–Beloostrov through Sestroretsk line continued to work by steam power after the revolution up to World War II. The first work on electrification at this site began in 1950.

In the early 1950s, the Lanskaya electric substation was built behind the station. Electrification of the railway began in the direction of Leningrad to Zelenogorsk in 1951 (now it's part of Saint Petersburg Finlyandsky–Vyborg line). At the station, new platforms have been constructed and the length of trains has increased. The track in the direction of Finlyandsky Rail Terminal and Udelnaya station has also been electrified.

On 4 August 1951, at 1 hour and thirty minutes after midnight the electric power was switched on to the network of the first electrified line in the Karelian Isthmus area between Leningrad and Zelenogorsk. At 1 hour 50 minutes, a trial trip of the first electric train set off en route in the direction of Arsenyev N. A. The first passengers travelled on the electric train during the day, conducted by train driver-instructor Romanov A. N. Regular services also started on the same day.

In 1952, the Lansky–Sestroretsk–Beloostrov line (now it is named Saint Petersburg Finlyandsky–Beloostrov through Sestroretsk line) was electrified. On the day of 1 June 1952, the first trial of an electric train went through Lanskaya and Sestroretsk to Beloostrov, and on the same day, from the morning onwards regular services began.

The time of electrification of the line connecting Lanskaya to Кushelevka is not known, but as of 2000, it too was electrified, as well as all tracks at the station.

Probably, in 1951 at the station there was a railway failure. The probability of this event is indirectly confirmed by the law edition the same year.

=== Today ===
The station underwent major repairs in 2003. Work was done on the building of the station and on a platform. The enormous wood furnace which was in a corner of a waiting hall for almost a century was dismantled at this time.

== Landmarks near to Lanskaya station ==
- Near the station there was Lenin's museum in his last safe house apartment used before the revolution of October 25 (November 7), 1917. It was from this apartment that he left on foot to chair the revolution headquarters in downtown Smolny. The museum was mentioned in the computer game "Revolutionary quest" (2004).
- In January 1941 building, began of the Saint Petersburg Metro. Somewhere around the Lansky railway station it was planned to construct a terminal station for the Line 1 of Saint Petersburg Metro.
- Opposite a platform, there is Lanskaya electric substation.

== Notable events ==
The station is in the memoirs of famous people:

- The outstanding scientist, recipient of the USSR State Prize, Feodor Ivanovich Dubovitsky wrote that in 1931–1934 it by train with a steam locomotive went on a route from station Lansky to station Pesochny by last train.
- Well-known Russian clown and actor Yuri Nikulin went to the Winter War from Lanskaya station in 1940.

== Gallery ==
Buildings

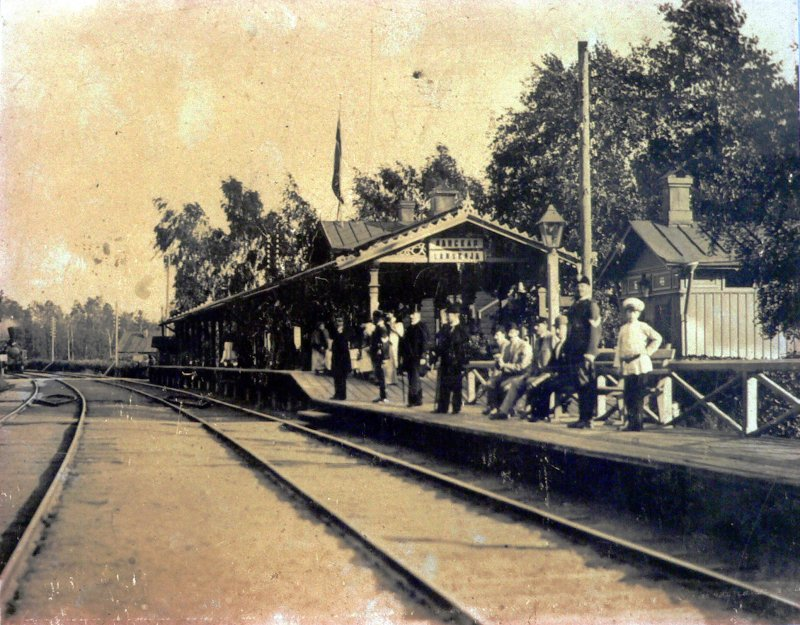
Lanskaya railway station in the 1900s.

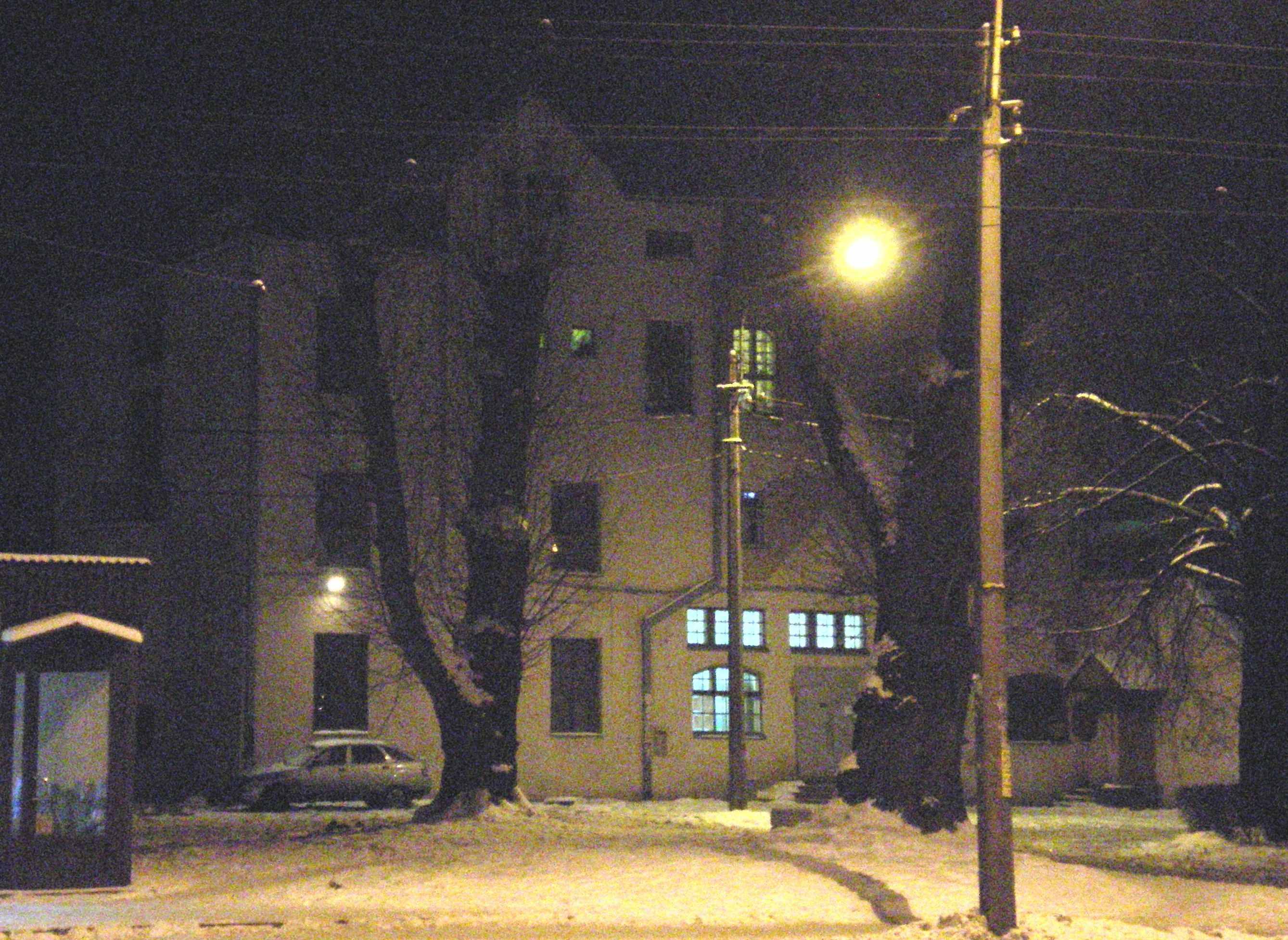
Lanskaya station-house

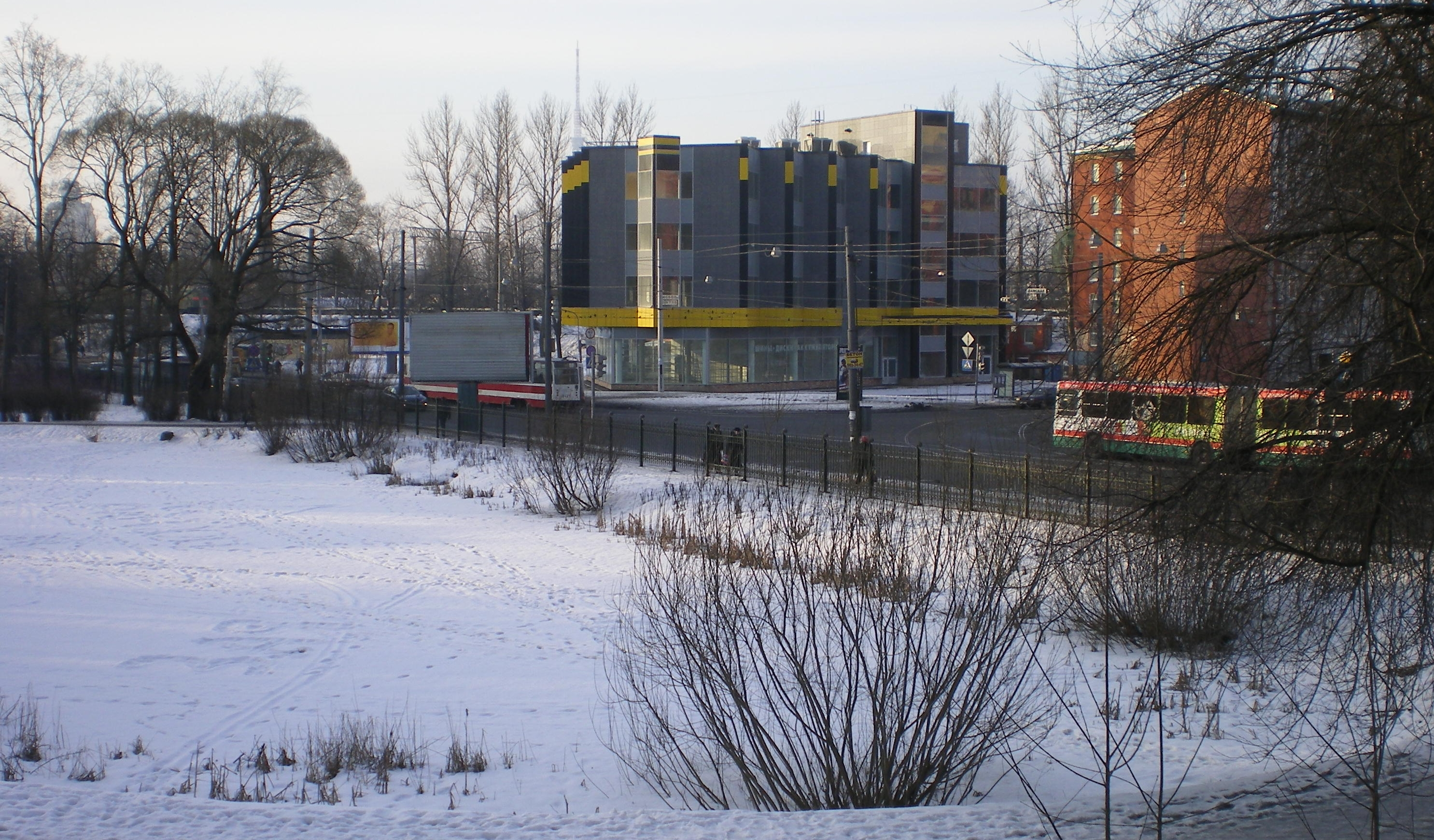
Railway station in 2009. The station is located behind houses

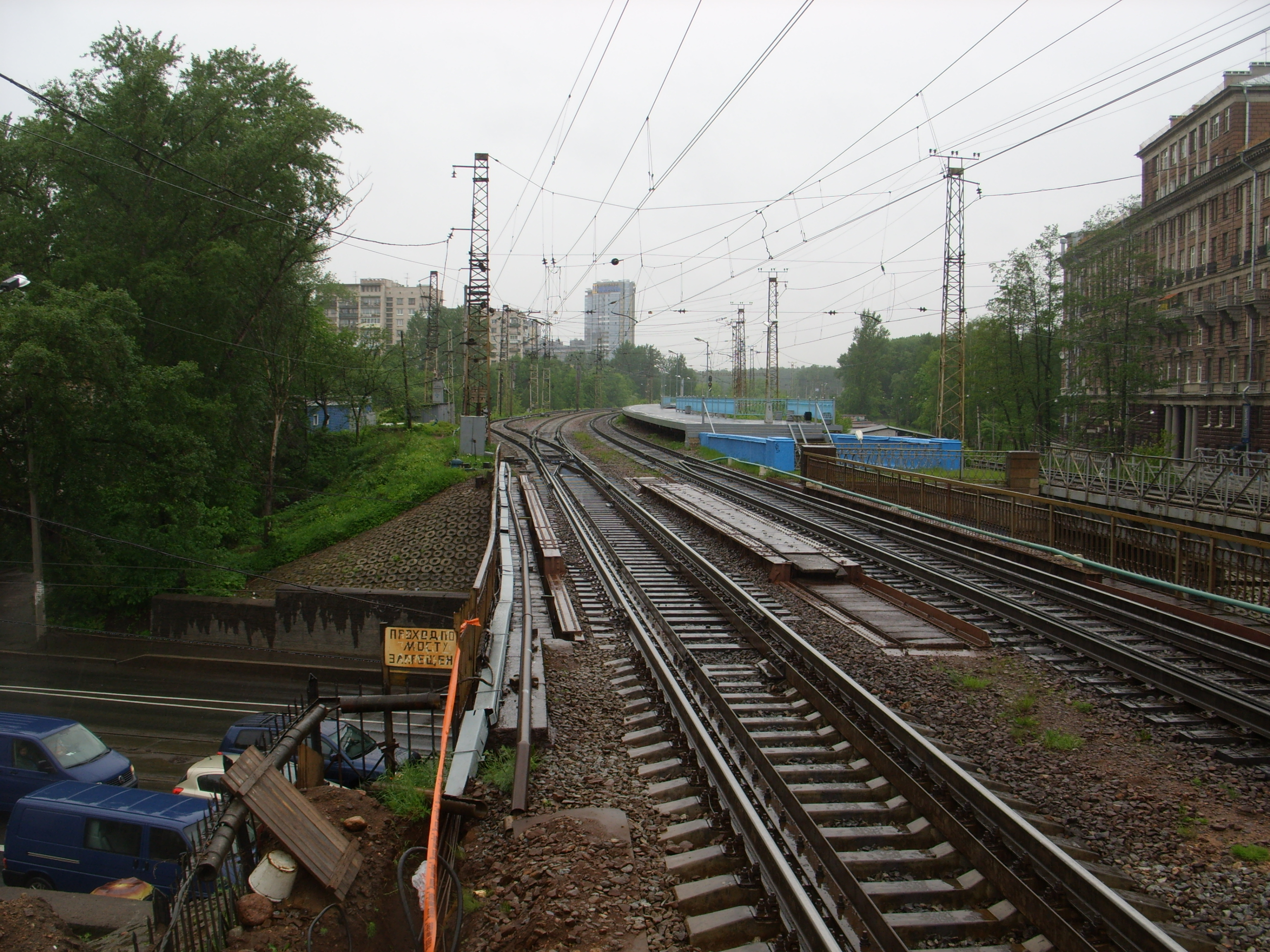
Station platform behind the overpass
Kinds of local passenger train

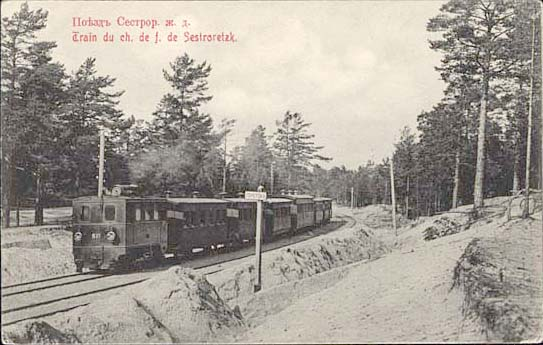
Train of the Seaside Sestroretsk railway. In operation at this station about 1900

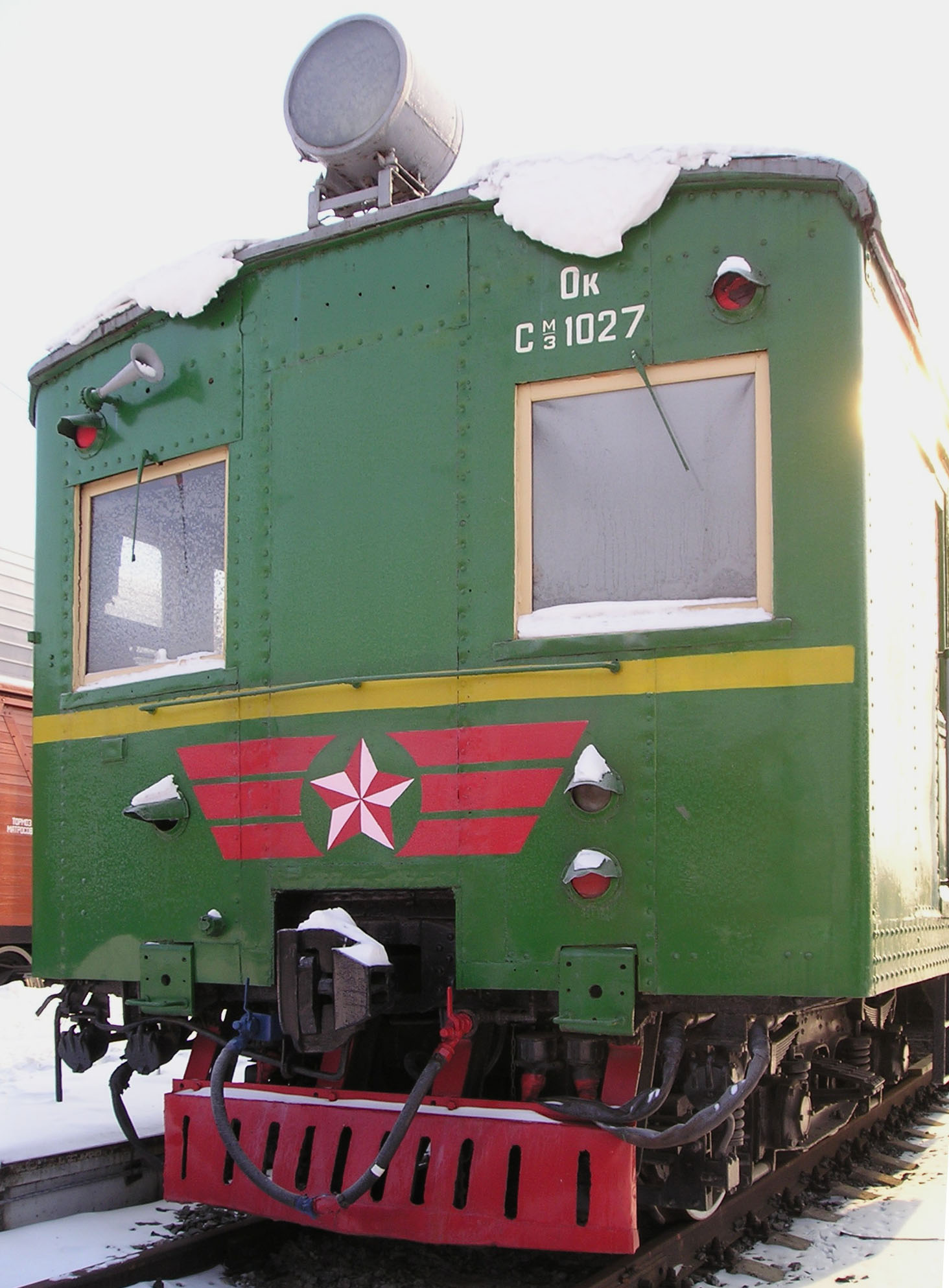
Train type Sm3. It was used here between 1950 and 1980

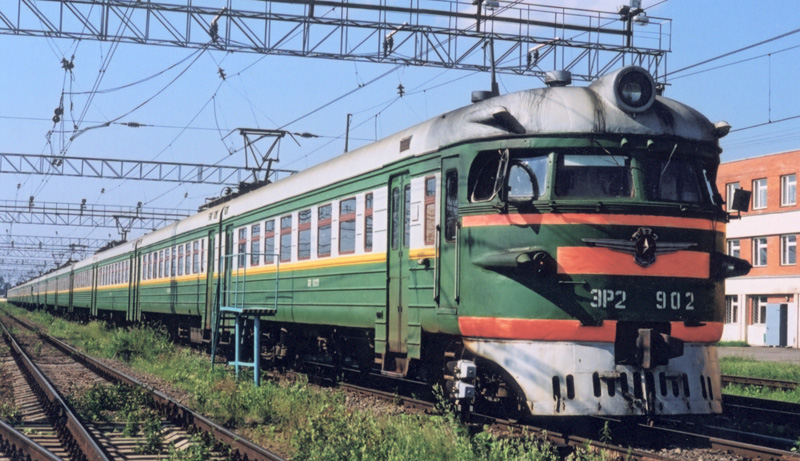
Train type ER2. These have been used here since 1980
