= 1925 in rail transport =

This article lists events related to rail transport that occurred in 1925.

== Events ==
=== January events ===
- January 1 – Government of India takes over East Indian Railway Company.

=== February events ===
- February 3 – Great Indian Peninsular Railway inaugurates first section of Bombay suburban electrification out of Victoria Terminus.
- February 16 – A new suspension bridge opens over Niagara Falls, replacing the previous span built in 1855.
- February 28 – The Chicago, Lake Shore and South Bend Railroad enters receivership.

=== March events ===
- March 14 – Groundbreaking ceremonies for construction of the Independent Subway System's Eighth Avenue Line are held at 123rd Street and St. Nicholas Avenue.
- March 24 – The Gyokunan Electric Railway in Japan opens.

=== April events ===
- April 24 – The first section of the Itsukaichi Railway opens between Haijima and Itsukaichi stations in Japan.

=== June events ===
- June 23 – The Chicago South Shore and South Bend Railroad is incorporated and purchases the assets of the Chicago, Lake Shore and South Bend Railroad.

=== July events ===
- July 1 – Government of India takes over Great Indian Peninsula Railway.
- July 5 – Samuel Insull begins serving as president of Chicago South Shore and South Bend Railroad with the introduction of major reconstruction projects for the railroad.
- July 10 – Tobu Tojo Line, Ikebukuro, Tokyo, to Yorii route officially completed in Japan.
- July 17 – Japanese Government Railways introduce automatic couplers in a 24-hour changeover.

=== September events ===
- September 8 – Hull Electric Railway discontinues through service to Queen's Park, Toronto: passengers must now transfer to trains running from Aylmer.
- September 27 – The Ginza Line, the oldest subway line in Asia, begins construction in Tokyo, Japan between Asakusa and Ueno.

=== October events ===
- October – Sir Henry Fowler succeeds George Hughes as Chief Mechanical Engineer of the London, Midland and Scottish Railway.
- October 22 – Central Railroad of New Jersey 1000, the first commercial diesel-electric locomotive, enters service at the Bronx Terminal Yard.

=== November events ===
- November 1 – Japan's Yamanote Line, which becomes one of Tokyo's busiest and most important commuter lines, opens.
- November 4 – Opening of Khyber Pass Railway, from Peshawar to Landi Kotal.
- November 21 – Seaboard Air Line introduces the “Orange Blossom Special”.

=== December events ===
- December 15 – Long Island Rail Road 401, the first diesel-electric locomotive used in mainline service, is demonstrated for the first time.

=== Unknown date events ===
- Rebuilding of Berlin Friedrichstraße station in Germany is completed.
- Henry deForest succeeds Julius Kruttschnitt as chairman of the executive committee for the Southern Pacific Company, the parent company of the Southern Pacific Railroad.
- Lima Locomotive Works builds the first 2-8-4 steam locomotives, their first "Super Power" types, for the Boston and Albany Railroad's routes through The Berkshires; also, the first production 2-10-4s, for the Texas and Pacific Railway.
- Electro-Motive Engineering changes its name to Electro-Motive Corporation (a company that would later become General Motors Electro-Motive Division).
- William W. Atterbury becomes president of the Pennsylvania Railroad.
- American Car and Foundry acquires Fageol and Hall-Scott.
- The New York Central Railroad establishes a new subsidiary, the Eastern Refrigerator Despatch. Operation of the ERD, along with its 2,100 reefers, is quickly absorbed by Merchants Despatch.

== Births ==
=== Unknown date births ===
- H. Reid, prominent railroad photographer and historian (died 1992).
