= Maritsa, Kursk Oblast =

Rural locality in Kursk Oblast, Russia

Maritsa Марица
- Selo
- Interactive map of Maritsa
- Location of Maritsa Maritsa (Kursk Oblast)
- Coordinates: 51°45′12″N 35°16′04″E
- Country: Russia
- Federal subject: Kursk Oblast
- Administrative district: Lgovsky District
- SelsovietSelsoviet: Maritsky

Population (2010 Census)
  - Total: 655
  - Estimate (2010): 655 (0%)

Administrative status
  - Capital of: Maritsky Selsoviet

Municipal status
  - Municipal district: Lgovsky Municipal District
  - Rural settlement: Maritsky Selsoviet Rural Settlement
  - Capital of: Maritsky Selsoviet Rural Settlement
- Time zone: UTC+3 (MSK)
- Postal code: 307705
- Dialing code: +7 47140
- OKTMO ID: 38622464101
- Website: marickiy.ru

Maritsa (Russian: Марица) is a rural locality (Russian: село, lit. 'village') and the administrative center of Maritsky Selsoviet Rural Settlement, Lgovsky District, Kursk Oblast, Russia. Population: 655 (2010 census); 868 (2002 census);

== Geography ==
The village is located on the Prutishche River in the basin of the Seym, 59 km from the Russia–Ukraine border, 64 km west of Kursk, 10 km north of the district center – the town Lgov.

Climate

Maritsa has a warm-summer humid continental climate (Dfb in the Köppen climate classification).

Climate data for Maritsa
Month	Jan	Feb	Mar	Apr	May	Jun	Jul	Aug	Sep	Oct	Nov	Dec	Year
Mean daily maximum °C (°F)	−3.9 (25.0)	−3 (27)	2.9 (37.2)	13 (55)	19.3 (66.7)	22.6 (72.7)	25.1 (77.2)	24.4 (75.9)	18.1 (64.6)	10.5 (50.9)	3.5 (38.3)	−1.1 (30.0)	11.0 (51.7)
Daily mean °C (°F)	−6 (21)	−5.5 (22.1)	−0.7 (30.7)	8.2 (46.8)	14.6 (58.3)	18.3 (64.9)	20.8 (69.4)	19.8 (67.6)	13.9 (57.0)	7.3 (45.1)	1.3 (34.3)	−3 (27)	7.4 (45.3)
Mean daily minimum °C (°F)	−8.4 (16.9)	−8.5 (16.7)	−4.7 (23.5)	2.8 (37.0)	9.1 (48.4)	12.9 (55.2)	15.8 (60.4)	14.7 (58.5)	9.7 (49.5)	4 (39)	−1 (30)	−5.2 (22.6)	3.4 (38.1)
Average precipitation mm (inches)	50 (2.0)	44 (1.7)	48 (1.9)	50 (2.0)	63 (2.5)	71 (2.8)	77 (3.0)	54 (2.1)	57 (2.2)	57 (2.2)	48 (1.9)	49 (1.9)	668 (26.2)
Source: https://en.climate-data.org/asia/russian-federation/kursk-oblast/марица-653997/

== Transport ==
Maritsa is located 14 km from the road of regional importance 38K-017 (Kursk – Lgov – Rylsk – border with Ukraine) as part of the European route E38, on the road 38K-023 (Lgov – Konyshyovka), 20 km from the road of intermunicipal significance 38H-362 (38K-017 – Nikolayevka – Shirkovo), on the roads 38H-437 (38K-023 – Olshanka – Marmyzhi – 38N-362) and 38H-434 (38N-437 – Krasnaya Dubrava). There is a railway halt Maritsa within the locality limits (railway line Navlya – Lgov-Kiyevsky).

The rural locality is situated 70 km from Kursk Vostochny Airport, 153 km from Belgorod International Airport and 273 km from Voronezh Peter the Great Airport.
