= Olshanka, Lgovsky District, Kursk Oblast =

Rural locality in Kursk Oblast, Russia

Olshanka Ольшанка
- Selo
- Interactive map of Olshanka
- Location of Olshanka Olshanka (Kursk Oblast)
- Coordinates: 51°46′15″N 35°25′28″E
- Country: Russia
- Federal subject: Kursk Oblast
- Administrative district: Lgovsky District
- SelsovietSelsoviet: Ivanchikovsky

Population (2010 Census)
  - Total: 456
  - Estimate (2010): 456 (0%)

Municipal status
  - Municipal district: Lgovsky Municipal District
  - Rural settlement: Ivanchikovsky Selsoviet Rural Settlement
- Time zone: UTC+3 (MSK)
- Postal code: 307733
- Dialing code: +7 47140
- OKTMO ID: 38622435141
- Website: ivanchikovo.ru

Olshanka (Russian: Ольшанка) is a rural locality (Russian: село, lit. 'village') in Ivanchikovsky Selsoviet Rural Settlement, Lgovsky District, Kursk Oblast, Russia. Population: 456 (2010 census); 614 (2002 census);

== Geography ==
The village is located on the Olshanka River (a left tributary of the Prutishche in the basin of the Seym), 64 km from the Russia–Ukraine border, 53 km north-west of Kursk, 16 km north-east of the district center – the town Lgov, 6 km from the selsoviet center – Ivanchikovo.

Climate

Olshanka has a warm-summer humid continental climate (Dfb in the Köppen climate classification).

Climate data for Olshanka
Month	Jan	Feb	Mar	Apr	May	Jun	Jul	Aug	Sep	Oct	Nov	Dec	Year
Mean daily maximum °C (°F)	−4 (25)	−3 (27)	2.8 (37.0)	12.9 (55.2)	19.2 (66.6)	22.5 (72.5)	25 (77)	24.4 (75.9)	18 (64)	10.5 (50.9)	3.4 (38.1)	−1.1 (30.0)	10.9 (51.6)
Daily mean °C (°F)	−6.1 (21.0)	−5.5 (22.1)	−0.8 (30.6)	8.1 (46.6)	14.6 (58.3)	18.2 (64.8)	20.7 (69.3)	19.8 (67.6)	13.9 (57.0)	7.2 (45.0)	1.2 (34.2)	−3.1 (26.4)	7.4 (45.2)
Mean daily minimum °C (°F)	−8.5 (16.7)	−8.6 (16.5)	−4.9 (23.2)	2.7 (36.9)	9 (48)	12.9 (55.2)	15.7 (60.3)	14.7 (58.5)	9.7 (49.5)	3.9 (39.0)	−1.1 (30.0)	−5.2 (22.6)	3.4 (38.0)
Average precipitation mm (inches)	51 (2.0)	45 (1.8)	48 (1.9)	51 (2.0)	63 (2.5)	71 (2.8)	76 (3.0)	55 (2.2)	58 (2.3)	58 (2.3)	48 (1.9)	49 (1.9)	673 (26.6)
Source: https://en.climate-data.org/asia/russian-federation/kursk-oblast/ольшанка-555438/

== Transport ==
Olshanka is located 17 km from the road of regional importance 38K-017 (Kursk – Lgov – Rylsk – border with Ukraine) as part of the European route E38, 11 km from the road 38K-023 (Lgov – Konyshyovka), 9 km from the road of intermunicipal significance 38H-362 (38K-017 – Nikolayevka – Shirkovo), on the road 38H-437 (38K-023 – Olshanka – Marmyzhi – 38N-362), 8.5 km from the nearest railway halt 565 km (railway line Navlya – Lgov-Kiyevsky).

The rural locality is situated 59 km from Kursk Vostochny Airport, 147 km from Belgorod International Airport and 262 km from Voronezh Peter the Great Airport.
