= Marmyzhi, Kurchatovsky District, Kursk Oblast =

Rural locality in Kursk Oblast, Russia

Marmyzhi Мармыжи
- Selo
- Interactive map of Marmyzhi
- Location of Marmyzhi Marmyzhi (Kursk Oblast)
- Coordinates: 51°48′18″N 35°29′30″E
- Country: Russia
- Federal subject: Kursk Oblast
- Administrative district: Kurchatovsky District
- SelsovietSelsoviet: Kosteltsevsky

Population (2010 Census)
  - Total: 115
  - Estimate (2010): 115 (0%)

Municipal status
  - Municipal district: Kurchatovsky Municipal District
  - Rural settlement: Kosteltsevsky Selsoviet Rural Settlement
- Time zone: UTC+3 (MSK)
- Postal code: 307222
- Dialing code: +7 47131
- OKTMO ID: 38621425121
- Website: костельцевский-сельсовет.рф

Marmyzhi (Russian: Мармыжи) is a rural locality (Russian: село, lit. 'village') in Kosteltsevsky Selsoviet Rural Settlement, Kurchatovsky District, Kursk Oblast, Russia. Population: 115 (2010 census); 171 (2002 census);

== Geography ==
The village is located on the Prutishche River in the basin of the Seym, 69 km from the Russia–Ukraine border, 49 km north-west of Kursk, 20 km north-west of the district center – the town Kurchatov, 5 km from the selsoviet center – Kosteltsevo.

Climate

Marmyzhi has a warm-summer humid continental climate (Dfb in the Köppen climate classification).

Climate data for Marmyzhi
Month	Jan	Feb	Mar	Apr	May	Jun	Jul	Aug	Sep	Oct	Nov	Dec	Year
Mean daily maximum °C (°F)	−4.1 (24.6)	−3.1 (26.4)	2.7 (36.9)	12.9 (55.2)	19.1 (66.4)	22.4 (72.3)	25 (77)	24.3 (75.7)	18 (64)	10.4 (50.7)	3.4 (38.1)	−1.2 (29.8)	10.8 (51.4)
Daily mean °C (°F)	−6.1 (21.0)	−5.6 (21.9)	−0.8 (30.6)	8.1 (46.6)	14.5 (58.1)	18.2 (64.8)	20.7 (69.3)	19.8 (67.6)	13.9 (57.0)	7.2 (45.0)	1.2 (34.2)	−3.1 (26.4)	7.3 (45.2)
Mean daily minimum °C (°F)	−8.5 (16.7)	−8.6 (16.5)	−4.9 (23.2)	2.7 (36.9)	9 (48)	12.9 (55.2)	15.7 (60.3)	14.7 (58.5)	9.6 (49.3)	3.9 (39.0)	−1.1 (30.0)	−5.3 (22.5)	3.3 (38.0)
Average precipitation mm (inches)	51 (2.0)	45 (1.8)	48 (1.9)	51 (2.0)	63 (2.5)	71 (2.8)	76 (3.0)	55 (2.2)	58 (2.3)	58 (2.3)	48 (1.9)	49 (1.9)	673 (26.6)
Source: https://en.climate-data.org/asia/russian-federation/kursk-oblast/мармыжи-666590/

== Transport ==
Marmyzhi is located 36.5 km from the federal route M-2 Crimea Highway, 20 km from the road of regional importance 38K-017 (Kursk – Lgov – Rylsk – border with Ukraine), 13.5 km from the road 38K-023 (Lgov – Konyshyovka), on the road of intermunicipal significance 38H-437 (38K-023 – Olshanka – Marmyzhi – 38K-017), 13,5 km from the nearest railway halt 565 km (railway line Navlya – Lgov-Kiyevsky).

The rural locality is situated 55 km from Kursk Vostochny Airport, 149 km from Belgorod International Airport and 258 km from Voronezh Peter the Great Airport.
