= Uspenka, Russia =

Uspenka (Russian: Успенка) is the name of several inhabited localities in Russia.

== Altai Krai ==
As of 2012, two rural localities in Altai Krai bear this name:

- Uspenka, Loktevsky District, Altai Krai, a selo and the administrative center of Uspensky Selsoviet of Loktevsky District;
- Uspenka, Tabunsky District, Altai Krai, a selo in Serebropolsky Selsoviet of Tabunsky District;

== Astrakhan Oblast ==
As of 2012, one rural locality in Astrakhan Oblast bears this name:

- Uspenka, Astrakhan Oblast, a village and the administrative center of Uspensky Selsoviet of Akhtubinsky District

== Republic of Bashkortostan ==
As of 2012, two rural localities in Altai Krai bear this name:

- Uspenka, Arkhangelsky District, Republic of Bashkortostan, a selo in Krasnokurtovsky Selsoviet of Arkhangelsky District;
- Uspenka, Blagoveshchensky District, Republic of Bashkortostan, a selo in Izyaksky Selsoviet of Blagoveshchensky District;

== Belgorod Oblast ==
As of 2012, two rural localities in Belgorod Oblast bear this name:

- Uspenka, Gubkinsky District, Belgorod Oblast, a selo in Gubkinsky District;
- Uspenka, Volokonovsky District, Belgorod Oblast, a selo in Volokonovsky District;

== Kurgan Oblast ==
As of 2012, one rural locality in Kurgan Oblast bears this name:

- Uspenka, Kurgan Oblast, a village in Polovinsky District

== Kursk Oblast ==
As of 2012, three rural localities in Kursk Oblast bear this name:

- Uspenka, Kastorensky District, Kursk Oblast, a selo in Kastorensky District;
- Uspenka, Kurchatovsky District, Kursk Oblast, a selo in Kurchatovsky District;
- Uspenka, Timsky District, Kursk Oblast, a selo in Timsky District;

== Mari El ==
As of 2012, one rural locality in Mari El bears this name:

- Uspenka, Mari El, a village in Orshansky District;

== Perm Krai ==
As of 2012, one rural locality in Perm Krai bears this name:

- Uspenka, Perm Krai, a village in Chusovskoye Urban Settlement;

== Volgograd Oblast ==
As of 2012, one rural locality in Volgograd Oblast bears this name:

- Uspenka, Volgograd Oblast, a village in Nekhayevsky District;
