= Soglayevo =

Rural locality in Kursk Oblast, Russia

Soglayevo Соглаево
- Village
- Interactive map of Soglayevo
- Location of Soglayevo Soglayevo (Kursk Oblast)
- Coordinates: 51°47′26″N 35°36′10″E
- Country: Russia
- Federal subject: Kursk Oblast
- Administrative district: Kurchatovsky District
- SelsovietSelsoviet: Kosteltsevsky

Population (2010 Census)
  - Total: 21
  - Estimate (2010): 21 (0%)

Municipal status
  - Municipal district: Kurchatovsky Municipal District
  - Rural settlement: Kosteltsevsky Selsoviet Rural Settlement
- Time zone: UTC+3 (MSK)
- Postal code: 307223
- Dialing code: +7 47131
- OKTMO ID: 38621425176
- Website: костельцевский-сельсовет.рф

Soglayevo (Russian: Соглаево) is a rural locality (Russian: деревня, lit. 'village') in Kosteltsevsky Selsoviet Rural Settlement, Kurchatovsky District, Kursk Oblast, Russia. Population: 21 (2010 census); 28 (2002 census);

== Geography ==
The village is located on the Demina River (a right tributary of the Seym), 70.5 km from the Russia–Ukraine border, 41 km north-west of Kursk, 15.5 km north of the district center – the town Kurchatov, 4.5 km from the selsoviet center – Kosteltsevo.

Climate

Soglayevo has a warm-summer humid continental climate (Dfb in the Köppen climate classification).

== Transport ==
Soglayevo is located 31.5 km from the federal route M-2 Crimea Highway, 15 km from the road of regional importance 38K-017 (Kursk – Lgov – Rylsk – border with Ukraine), 21 km from the road 38K-023 (Lgov – Konyshyovka), 2 km from the road of intermunicipal significance 38H-362 (38K-017 – Nikolayevka – Shirkovo), 0.5 km from the road 38H-363 (38N-362 – Afanasyevka – Rogovo), 15,5 km from the nearest railway halt Kurchatow (railway line Lgov I — Kursk).

The rural locality is situated 47 km from Kursk Vostochny Airport, 144 km from Belgorod International Airport and 250 km from Voronezh Peter the Great Airport.
