= Durnevo, Kurchatovsky District, Kursk Oblast =

Rural locality in Kursk Oblast, Russia

Durnevo Дурнево
- Village
- Interactive map of Durnevo
- Location of Durnevo Durnevo (Kursk Oblast)
- Coordinates: 51°45′32″N 35°36′11″E
- Country: Russia
- Federal subject: Kursk Oblast
- Administrative district: Kurchatovsky District
- SelsovietSelsoviet: Kosteltsevsky

Population (2010 Census)
  - Total: 44
  - Estimate (2010): 44 (0%)

Municipal status
  - Municipal district: Kurchatovsky Municipal District
  - Rural settlement: Kosteltsevsky Selsoviet Rural Settlement
- Time zone: UTC+3 (MSK)
- Postal code: 307223
- Dialing code: +7 47131
- OKTMO ID: 38621425151
- Website: костельцевский-сельсовет.рф

Durnevo (Russian: Дурнево) is a rural locality (Russian: деревня, lit. 'village') in Kosteltsevsky Selsoviet Rural Settlement, Kurchatovsky District, Kursk Oblast, Russia. Population: 44 (2010 census); 53 (2002 census);

== Geography ==
The village is located on the Demina River (a right tributary of the Seym), 67 km from the Russia–Ukraine border, 41 km north-west of Kursk, 12 km north-west of the district center – the town Kurchatov, 8 km from the selsoviet center – Kosteltsevo.

Climate

Durnevo has a warm-summer humid continental climate (Dfb in the Köppen climate classification).

== Transport ==
Durnevo is located 32.5 km from the federal route M-2 Crimea Highway, 11 km from the road of regional importance 38K-017 (Kursk – Lgov – Rylsk – border with Ukraine), 23 km from the road 38K-023 (Lgov – Konyshyovka), 3 km from the road of intermunicipal significance 38H-362 (38K-017 – Nikolayevka – Shirkovo), 2 km from the road 38H-363 (38N-362 – Afanasyevka – Rogovo), on the road 38H-781 (38N-363 – Durnevo), 11.5 km from the nearest railway halt Kurchatow (railway line Lgov I — Kursk).

The rural locality is situated 46.5 km from Kursk Vostochny Airport, 140 km from Belgorod International Airport and 250 km from Voronezh Peter the Great Airport.
