= Kosoy Khutor =

Rural locality in Kursk Oblast, Russia

Kosoy Khutor Косой Хутор
- Settlement
- Interactive map of Kosoy Khutor
- Location of Kosoy Khutor Kosoy Khutor (Kursk Oblast)
- Coordinates: 51°44′24″N 35°39′19″E
- Country: Russia
- Federal subject: Kursk Oblast
- Administrative district: Kurchatovsky District
- SelsovietSelsoviet: Kosteltsevsky

Population (2010 Census)
  - Total: 6
  - Estimate (2010): 6 (0%)

Municipal status
  - Municipal district: Kurchatovsky Municipal District
  - Rural settlement: Kosteltsevsky Selsoviet Rural Settlement
- Time zone: UTC+3 (MSK)
- Postal code: 307223
- Dialing code: +7 47131
- OKTMO ID: 38621425156
- Website: костельцевский-сельсовет.рф

Kosoy Khutor (Russian: Косой Хутор) is a rural locality (a settlement) in Kosteltsevsky Selsoviet Rural Settlement, Kurchatovsky District, Kursk Oblast, Russia. Population: 6 (2010 census); 14 (2002 census);

== Geography ==
The settlement is located 67.5 km from the Russia–Ukraine border, 37 km west of Kursk, 9.5 km north of the district center – the town Kurchatov, 11.5 km from the selsoviet center – Kosteltsevo.

Climate

Kosoy Khutor has a warm-summer humid continental climate (Dfb in the Köppen climate classification).

== Transport ==
Kosoy Khutor is located 29 km from the federal route M-2 Crimea Highway, 9 km from the road of regional importance 38K-017 (Kursk – Lgov – Rylsk – border with Ukraine), 26.5 km from the road 38K-023 (Lgov – Konyshyovka), 2.5 km from the road of intermunicipal significance 38H-575 (Seym River – Mosolovo – Nizhneye Soskovo), 3 km from the road Kurchatov – Zhmakino – Checheviznya, 9.5 km from the nearest railway halt Kurchatow (railway line Lgov I — Kursk).

The rural locality is situated 43.5 km from Kursk Vostochny Airport, 137 km from Belgorod International Airport and 247 km from Voronezh Peter the Great Airport.
