= Aleksandrovsky, Kurchatovsky District, Kursk Oblast =

Rural locality in Kursk Oblast, Russia

Aleksandrovsky Александровский
- Khutor
- Interactive map of Aleksandrovsky
- Location of Aleksandrovsky Aleksandrovsky (Kursk Oblast)
- Coordinates: 51°41′29″N 35°43′53″E
- Country: Russia
- Federal subject: Kursk Oblast
- Administrative district: Kurchatovsky District
- SelsovietSelsoviet: Makarovsky

Population (2010 Census)
  - Total: 3
  - Estimate (2010): 3 (0%)

Municipal status
  - Municipal district: Kurchatovsky Municipal District
  - Rural settlement: Makarovsky Selsoviet Rural Settlement
- Time zone: UTC+3 (MSK)
- Postal code: 307221
- Dialing code: +7 47131
- OKTMO ID: 38621422126
- Website: макаровский-сельсовет.рф

Aleksandrovsky (Russian: Александровский) is a rural locality (a khutor) in Makarovsky Selsoviet Rural Settlement, Kurchatovsky District, Kursk Oblast, Russia. Population: 3 (2010 census); 10 (2002 census);

== Geography ==
The khutor is located on the Seym River, 66 km from the Russia–Ukraine border, 32 km south-west of Kursk, 7 km north-east of the district center – the town Kurchatov, 14.5 km from the selsoviet center – Makarovka.

Climate

Aleksandrovsky has a warm-summer humid continental climate (Dfb in the Köppen climate classification).

== Transport ==
Aleksandrovsky is located 23 km from the federal route M-2 Crimea Highway, 2.5 km from the road of regional importance 38K-017 (Kursk – Lgov – Rylsk – border with Ukraine), 3 km from the road of intermunicipal significance 38H-575 (Seym River – Mosolovo – Nizhneye Soskovo), 1.5 km from the road 38H-576 (38N-575 – Zolotukhino), 4 km from the nearest railway halt 433 km (railway line Lgov I — Kursk).

The rural locality is situated 38.5 km from Kursk Vostochny Airport, 130 km from Belgorod International Airport and 242 km from Voronezh Peter the Great Airport.
