= Uspenka (rural locality) =

Uspenka is the name of several rural localities in Russia:

- Uspenka, Loktevsky District, Altai Krai
- Uspenka, Tabunsky District, Altai Krai
- Uspenka, Astrakhan Oblast
- Uspenka, Arkhangelsky District, Republic of Bashkortostan
- Uspenka, Blagoveshchensky District, Republic of Bashkortostan
- Uspenka, Perm Krai

== See also ==
- Uspenka, an urban-type settlement in Luhansk Oblast, Ukraine
