= Zhuravinka, Kurchatovsky District, Kursk Oblast =

Rural locality in Kursk Oblast, Russia

Zhuravinka Журавинка
- Village
- Location of Zhuravinka
- Location of Zhuravinka Zhuravinka (Kursk Oblast)
- Coordinates: 51°49′35″N 35°30′42″E
- Country: Russia
- Federal subject: Kursk Oblast
- Administrative district: Kurchatovsky District
- Selsoviet: Kosteltsevsky

Population (2010 Census)
  - Total: 15

Municipal status
  - Municipal district: Kurchatovsky Municipal District
  - Rural settlement: Kosteltsevsky Selsoviet Rural Settlement
- Time zone: UTC+3 (MSK)
- Postal code(s): 307224
- Dialing code(s): +7 47131
- OKTMO ID: 38621425106
- Website: костельцевский-сельсовет.рф

Zhuravinka (Russian: Журавинка) is a rural locality (Russian: деревня, lit. 'village') in Kosteltsevsky Selsoviet Rural Settlement, Kurchatovsky District, Kursk Oblast, Russia. Population: 15 (2010 Census); 28 (2002 Census);

== Geography ==
The village is located on the Prutishche River in the basin of the Seym, 72 km (45 mi) from the Russia–Ukraine border, 48.5 km (30.1 mi) north-west of Kursk, 21 km (13 mi) north-west of the district center – the town Kurchatov, 3 km (1.9 mi) from the selsoviet center – Kosteltsevo.

Climate

Zhuravinka has a warm-summer humid continental climate (Dfb in the Köppen climate classification).

== Transport ==
Zhuravinka is located 34 km from the federal route M-2 Crimea Highway, 20 km from the road of regional importance 38K-017 (Kursk – Lgov – Rylsk – border with Ukraine), 14 km from the road 38K-023 (Lgov – Konyshyovka), 5 km from the road of intermunicipal significance 38H-362 (38K-017 – Nikolayevka – Shirkovo), 2.5 km from the road 38H-365 (38N-362 – Kosteltsevo – Zaprutye), 15.5 km from the nearest railway station Konyshyovka (railway line Navlya – Lgov-Kiyevsky).

The rural locality is 54 km (34 mi) from Kursk Vostochny Airport, 150 km (93 mi) from Belgorod International Airport and 256 km (159 mi) from Voronezh Peter the Great Airport.
