= Plaksino, Kursk Oblast =

Rural locality in Kursk Oblast, Russia

Plaksino Плаксино
- Village
- Interactive map of Plaksino
- Location of Plaksino Plaksino (Kursk Oblast)
- Coordinates: 51°43′11″N 35°44′15″E
- Country: Russia
- Federal subject: Kursk Oblast
- Administrative district: Kurchatovsky District
- SelsovietSelsoviet: Kosteltsevsky

Population (2010 Census)
  - Total: 27
  - Estimate (2010): 27 (0%)

Municipal status
  - Municipal district: Kurchatovsky Municipal District
  - Rural settlement: Kosteltsevsky Selsoviet Rural Settlement
- Time zone: UTC+3 (MSK)
- Postal code: 307250
- Dialing code: +7 47131
- OKTMO ID: 38621425166
- Website: костельцевский-сельсовет.рф

Plaksino (Russian: Плаксино) is a rural locality (Russian: деревня, lit. 'village') in Kosteltsevsky Selsoviet Rural Settlement, Kurchatovsky District, Kursk Oblast, Russia. Population: 27 (2010 census); 51 (2002 census);

== Geography ==
The village is located on the Lomna River (a right tributary of the Seym), 69 km from the Russia–Ukraine border, 32 km west of Kursk, 9 km north-east of the district center – the town Kurchatov, 17 km from the selsoviet center – Kosteltsevo.

=== Climate ===
Plaksino has a warm-summer humid continental climate (Dfb in the Köppen climate classification).

== Transport ==
Plaksino is located 23 km from the federal route M-2 Crimea Highway, 6 km from the road of regional importance 38K-017 (Kursk – Lgov – Rylsk – border with Ukraine), 1.5 km from the road of intermunicipal significance 38H-575 (Seym River – Mosolovo – Nizhneye Soskovo), 2 km from the road 38H-576 (38N-575 – Zolotukhino), 7,5 km from the nearest railway halt 433 km (railway line Lgov I — Kursk).

Plaksino is situated 38 km from Kursk Vostochny Airport, 132 km from Belgorod International Airport and 241 km from Voronezh Peter the Great Airport.
