= Gupovo =

Rural locality in Kursk Oblast, Russia

Gupovo Гупово
- Village
- Interactive map of Gupovo
- Location of Gupovo Gupovo (Kursk Oblast)
- Coordinates: 51°42′35″N 35°40′34″E
- Country: Russia
- Federal subject: Kursk Oblast
- Administrative district: Kurchatovsky District
- SelsovietSelsoviet: Makarovsky

Population (2010 Census)
  - Total: 28
  - Estimate (2010): 28 (0%)

Municipal status
  - Municipal district: Kurchatovsky Municipal District
  - Rural settlement: Makarovsky Selsoviet Rural Settlement
- Time zone: UTC+3 (MSK)
- Postal code: 307226
- Dialing code: +7 47131
- OKTMO ID: 38621422131
- Website: макаровский-сельсовет.рф

Gupovo (Russian: Гупово) is a rural locality (Russian: деревня, lit. 'village') in Makarovsky Selsoviet Rural Settlement, Kurchatovsky District, Kursk Oblast, Russia. Population: 28 (2010 census); 45 (2002 census);

== Geography ==
The village is located on the Seym River, 65 km from the Russia–Ukraine border, 36 km west of Kursk, 6 km north of the district center – the town Kurchatov, 10.5 km from the selsoviet center – Makarovka.

Climate

Gupovo has a warm-summer humid continental climate (Dfb in the Köppen climate classification).

== Transport ==
Gupovo is located 27 km from the federal route M-2 Crimea Highway, 6 km from the road of regional importance 38K-017 (Kursk – Lgov – Rylsk – border with Ukraine), on the road of intermunicipal significance 38H-575 (Seym River – Mosolovo – Nizhneye Soskovo), 6 km from the nearest railway halt Kurchatow (railway line Lgov I — Kursk).

The rural locality is situated 42 km from Kursk Vostochny Airport, 133 km from Belgorod International Airport and 246 km from Voronezh Peter the Great Airport.
