= Mukhino, Kurchatovsky District, Kursk Oblast =

Rural locality in Kursk Oblast, Russia

Mukhino Мухино
- Village
- Interactive map of Mukhino
- Location of Mukhino Mukhino (Kursk Oblast)
- Coordinates: 51°50′35″N 35°35′34″E
- Country: Russia
- Federal subject: Kursk Oblast
- Administrative district: Kurchatovsky District
- SelsovietSelsoviet: Kosteltsevsky

Population (2010 Census)
  - Total: 34
  - Estimate (2010): 34 (0%)

Municipal status
  - Municipal district: Kurchatovsky Municipal District
  - Rural settlement: Kosteltsevsky Selsoviet Rural Settlement
- Time zone: UTC+3 (MSK)
- Postal code: 307224
- Dialing code: +7 47131
- OKTMO ID: 38621425126
- Website: костельцевский-сельсовет.рф

Mukhino (Russian: Мухино) is a rural locality (Russian: деревня, lit. 'village') in Kosteltsevsky Selsoviet Rural Settlement, Kurchatovsky District, Kursk Oblast, Russia. Population: 34 (2010 census); 58 (2002 census);

== Geography ==
The village is located on the Prutishche River in the basin of the Seym, 75.5 km from the Russia–Ukraine border, 43 km north-west of Kursk, 21 km north-west of the district center – the town Kurchatov, 3 km from the selsoviet center – Kosteltsevo.

Climate

Mukhino has a warm-summer humid continental climate (Dfb in the Köppen climate classification).

== Transport ==
Mukhino is located 30 km from the federal route M-2 Crimea Highway, 20.5 km from the road of regional importance 38K-017 (Kursk – Lgov – Rylsk – border with Ukraine), 18 km from the road 38K-023 (Lgov – Konyshyovka), 2 km from the road of intermunicipal significance 38H-362 (38K-017 – Nikolayevka – Shirkovo), 3 km from the road 38H-365 (38N-362 – Kosteltsevo – Zaprutye), on the road 38H-173 (Kosteltsevo – Mukhino), 20 km from the nearest railway halt 552 km (railway line Navlya – Lgov-Kiyevsky).

The rural locality is situated 48.5 km from Kursk Vostochny Airport, 149 km from Belgorod International Airport and 250 km from Voronezh Peter the Great Airport.
