= Zagryadskoye =

Rural locality in Kursk Oblast, Russia

Zagryadskoye Загрядское
- Village
- Interactive map of Zagryadskoye
- Location of Zagryadskoye Zagryadskoye (Kursk Oblast)
- Coordinates: 51°46′48″N 35°29′47″E
- Country: Russia
- Federal subject: Kursk Oblast
- Administrative district: Kurchatovsky District
- SelsovietSelsoviet: Kosteltsevsky

Population (2010 Census)
  - Total: 0
  - Estimate (2010): 0 )

Municipal status
  - Municipal district: Kurchatovsky Municipal District
  - Rural settlement: Kosteltsevsky Selsoviet Rural Settlement
- Time zone: UTC+3 (MSK)
- Postal code: 307224
- Dialing code: +7 47131
- OKTMO ID: 38621425111
- Website: костельцевский-сельсовет.рф

Zagryadskoye (Russian: Загрядское) is a rural locality (Russian: деревня, lit. 'village') in Kosteltsevsky Selsoviet Rural Settlement, Kurchatovsky District, Kursk Oblast, Russia. Population: 0 (2010 census); 10 (2002 census);

== Geography ==
The village is located in the Prutishche River basin (in the basin of the Seym), 66.5 km from the Russia–Ukraine border, 48 km north-west of Kursk, 17.5 km north-west of the district center – the town Kurchatov, 6.5 km from the selsoviet center – Kosteltsevo.

Climate

Zagryadskoye has a warm-summer humid continental climate (Dfb in the Köppen climate classification).

== Transport ==
Zagryadskoye is located 38 km from the federal route M-2 Crimea Highway, 17 km from the road of regional importance 38K-017 (Kursk – Lgov – Rylsk – border with Ukraine), 16 km from the road 38K-023 (Lgov – Konyshyovka), 4.5 km from the road of intermunicipal significance 38H-362 (38K-017 – Nikolayevka – Shirkovo), 1.5 km from the road 38H-437 (38K-023 – Olshanka – Marmyzhi – 38K-017), 13.5 km from the nearest railway halt 565 km (railway line Navlya – Lgov-Kiyevsky).

The rural locality is situated 54.5 km from Kursk Vostochny Airport, 146 km from Belgorod International Airport and 258 km from Voronezh Peter the Great Airport.
