= Kozhlya =

Rural locality in Kursk Oblast, Russia

Kozhlya Кожля
- Village
- Interactive map of Kozhlya
- Location of Kozhlya Kozhlya (Kursk Oblast)
- Coordinates: 51°44′02″N 35°33′32″E
- Country: Russia
- Federal subject: Kursk Oblast
- Administrative district: Kurchatovsky District
- SelsovietSelsoviet: Makarovsky

Population (2010 Census)
  - Total: 18
  - Estimate (2010): 18 (0%)

Municipal status
  - Municipal district: Kurchatovsky Municipal District
  - Rural settlement: Makarovsky Selsoviet Rural Settlement
- Time zone: UTC+3 (MSK)
- Postal code: 307221
- Dialing code: +7 47131
- OKTMO ID: 38621422116
- Website: макаровский-сельсовет.рф

Kozhlya (Russian: Кожля) is a rural locality (Russian: деревня, lit. 'village') in Makarovsky Selsoviet Rural Settlement, Kurchatovsky District, Kursk Oblast, Russia. Population: 18 (2010 census); 45 (2002 census);

== Geography ==
The village is located 63.5 km from the Russia–Ukraine border, 43.5 km west of Kursk, 11 km north-west of the district center – the town Kurchatov, 5 km from the selsoviet center – Makarovka.

Climate

Kozhlya has a warm-summer humid continental climate (Dfb in the Köppen climate classification).

== Transport ==
Kozhlya is located 35.5 km from the federal route M-2 Crimea Highway, 9.5 km from the road of regional importance 38K-017 (Kursk – Lgov – Rylsk – border with Ukraine), 0.5 km from the road of intermunicipal significance 38H-362 (38K-017 – Nikolayevka – Shirkovo), 10 km from the nearest railway station Lukashevka (railway line Lgov I — Kursk).

The rural locality is situated 50 km from Kursk Vostochny Airport, 140 km from Belgorod International Airport and 254 km from Voronezh Peter the Great Airport.
