= Cherny Kolodez, Kursk Oblast =

Rural locality in Kursk Oblast, Russia

Cherny Kolodez Чёрный Колодезь
- Village
- Interactive map of Cherny Kolodez
- Location of Cherny Kolodez Cherny Kolodez (Kursk Oblast)
- Coordinates: 51°51′55″N 35°38′10″E
- Country: Russia
- Federal subject: Kursk Oblast
- Administrative district: Kurchatovsky District
- SelsovietSelsoviet: Kosteltsevsky

Population (2010 Census)
  - Total: 27
  - Estimate (2010): 27 (0%)

Municipal status
  - Municipal district: Kurchatovsky Municipal District
  - Rural settlement: Kosteltsevsky Selsoviet Rural Settlement
- Time zone: UTC+3 (MSK)
- Postal code: 307225
- Dialing code: +7 47131
- OKTMO ID: 38621425221
- Website: костельцевский-сельсовет.рф

Cherny Kolodez (Russian: Чёрный Колодезь) is a rural locality (Russian: деревня, lit. 'village') in Kosteltsevsky Selsoviet Rural Settlement, Kurchatovsky District, Kursk Oblast, Russia. Population: 27 (2010 census); 43 (2002 census);

== Geography ==
The village is located in the Prutishche River basin (in the basin of the Seym), 79 km from the Russia–Ukraine border, 41 km north-west of Kursk, 23 km north of the district center – the town Kurchatov, 7 km from the selsoviet center – Kosteltsevo.

Climate

Cherny Kolodez has a warm-summer humid continental climate (Dfb in the Köppen climate classification).

== Transport ==
Cherny Kolodez is located 25 km from the federal route M-2 Crimea Highway, 23 km from the road of regional importance 38K-017 (Kursk – Lgov – Rylsk – border with Ukraine), 18.5 km from the road 38K-023 (Lgov – Konyshyovka), on the road of intermunicipal significance 38H-362 (38K-017 – Nikolayevka – Shirkovo), 23 km from the nearest railway halt Kurchatow (railway line Lgov I — Kursk).

The rural locality is situated 46 km from Kursk Vostochny Airport, 150 km from Belgorod International Airport and 247 km from Voronezh Peter the Great Airport.
