= Dronyayevsky =

Rural locality in Kursk Oblast, Russia

Dronyayevsky Дроняевский
- Khutor
- Interactive map of Dronyayevsky
- Location of Dronyayevsky Dronyayevsky (Kursk Oblast)
- Coordinates: 51°42′58″N 35°39′35″E
- Country: Russia
- Federal subject: Kursk Oblast
- Administrative district: Kurchatovsky District
- SelsovietSelsoviet: Makarovsky

Population (2010 Census)
  - Total: 29
  - Estimate (2010): 29 (0%)

Municipal status
  - Municipal district: Kurchatovsky Municipal District
  - Rural settlement: Makarovsky Selsoviet Rural Settlement
- Time zone: UTC+3 (MSK)
- Postal code: 307221
- Dialing code: +7 47131
- OKTMO ID: 38621422136
- Website: макаровский-сельсовет.рф

Dronyayevsky (Russian: Дроняевский) is a rural locality (a khutor) in Makarovsky Selsoviet Rural Settlement, Kurchatovsky District, Kursk Oblast, Russia. Population: 29 (2010 census); 45 (2002 census);

== Geography ==
The khutor is located in the Seym River basin, 65 km from the Russia–Ukraine border, 37 km west of Kursk, 6.5 km north of the district center – the town Kurchatov, 10 km from the selsoviet center – Makarovka.

Climate

Dronyayevsky has a warm-summer humid continental climate (Dfb in the Köppen climate classification).

== Transport ==
Dronyayevsky is located 28 km from the federal route M-2 Crimea Highway, 6 km from the road of regional importance 38K-017 (Kursk – Lgov – Rylsk – border with Ukraine), 2 km from the road of intermunicipal significance 38H-575 (Seym River – Mosolovo – Nizhneye Soskovo), 6.5 km from the nearest railway halt Kurchatow (railway line Lgov I — Kursk).

The rural locality is situated 43 km from Kursk Vostochny Airport, 134 km from Belgorod International Airport and 247 km from Voronezh Peter the Great Airport.
