= Kabanovka, Kurchatovsky District, Kursk Oblast =

Rural locality in Kursk Oblast, Russia

Kabanovka Кабановка
- Village
- Interactive map of Kabanovka
- Location of Kabanovka Kabanovka (Kursk Oblast)
- Coordinates: 51°42′47″N 35°31′03″E
- Country: Russia
- Federal subject: Kursk Oblast
- Administrative district: Kurchatovsky District
- SelsovietSelsoviet: Makarovsky

Population (2010 Census)
  - Total: 27
  - Estimate (2010): 27 (0%)

Municipal status
  - Municipal district: Kurchatovsky Municipal District
  - Rural settlement: Makarovsky Selsoviet Rural Settlement
- Time zone: UTC+3 (MSK)
- Postal code: 307226
- Dialing code: +7 47131
- OKTMO ID: 38621422106
- Website: макаровский-сельсовет.рф

Kabanovka (Russian: Кабановка) is a rural locality (Russian: деревня, lit. 'village') in Makarovsky Selsoviet Rural Settlement, Kurchatovsky District, Kursk Oblast, Russia. Population: 27 (2010 census); 55 (2002 census);

== Geography ==
The village is located on the Tereblya River (a right tributary of the Seym), 60 km from the Russia–Ukraine border, 46.5 km west of Kursk, 11 km north-west of the district center – the town Kurchatov, 2.5 km from the selsoviet center – Makarovka.

Climate

Kabanovka has a warm-summer humid continental climate (Dfb in the Köppen climate classification).

== Transport ==
Kabanovka is located 38 km from the federal route M-2 Crimea Highway, 8.5 km from the road of regional importance 38K-017 (Kursk – Lgov – Rylsk – border with Ukraine), 16 km from the road 38K-023 (Lgov – Konyshyovka), 4 km from the road of intermunicipal significance 38H-362 (38K-017 – Nikolayevka – Shirkovo), 2.5 km from the road 38H-366 (38N-362 – Makarovka – Lgov), 9 km from the nearest railway station Lukashevka (railway line Lgov I — Kursk).

The rural locality is situated 53 km from Kursk Vostochny Airport, 139 km from Belgorod International Airport and 256 km from Voronezh Peter the Great Airport.
