= Bolvanovo =

Rural locality in Kursk Oblast, Russia

Bolvanovo Болваново
- Village
- Interactive map of Bolvanovo
- Location of Bolvanovo Bolvanovo (Kursk Oblast)
- Coordinates: 51°50′06″N 35°38′30″E
- Country: Russia
- Federal subject: Kursk Oblast
- Administrative district: Kurchatovsky District
- SelsovietSelsoviet: Kosteltsevsky

Population (2010 Census)
  - Total: 67
  - Estimate (1782): 474 (+607.5%)

Municipal status
  - Municipal district: Kurchatovsky Municipal District
  - Rural settlement: Kosteltsevsky Selsoviet Rural Settlement
- Time zone: UTC+3 (MSK)
- Postal code: 307225
- Dialing code: +7 47131
- OKTMO ID: 38621425196
- Website: костельцевский-сельсовет.рф

Bolvanovo (Russian: Болваново) is a rural locality (Russian: деревня, lit. 'village') in Kosteltsevsky Selsoviet Rural Settlement, Kurchatovsky District, Kursk Oblast, Russia. Population: 67 (2010 census); 101 (2002 census);

== Geography ==
The village is located in the Prutishche River basin (in the basin of the Seym), 76 km from the Russia–Ukraine border, 40 km north-west of Kursk, 20 km north of the district center – the town Kurchatov, 6 km from the selsoviet center – Kosteltsevo.

Climate

Bolvanovo has a warm-summer humid continental climate (Dfb in the Köppen climate classification).

== Transport ==
Bolvanovo is located 26.5 km from the federal route M-2 Crimea Highway, 20 km from the road of regional importance 38K-017 (Kursk – Lgov – Rylsk – border with Ukraine), 20 km from the road 38K-023 (Lgov – Konyshyovka), on the road of intermunicipal significance 38H-362 (38K-017 – Nikolayevka – Shirkovo), 20 km from the nearest railway halt Kurchatow (railway line Lgov I — Kursk).

The rural locality is situated 45 km from Kursk Vostochny Airport, 147 km from Belgorod International Airport and 247 km from Voronezh Peter the Great Airport.
