= Zhmakino, Kursk Oblast =

Rural locality in Kursk Oblast, Russia

Zhmakino Жмакино
- Village
- Location of Zhmakino
- Location of Zhmakino Zhmakino (Kursk Oblast)
- Coordinates: 51°46′30″N 35°36′33″E
- Country: Russia
- Federal subject: Kursk Oblast
- Administrative district: Kurchatovsky District
- Selsoviet: Kosteltsevsky

Population (2010 Census)
  - Total: 121

Municipal status
  - Municipal district: Kurchatovsky Municipal District
  - Rural settlement: Kosteltsevsky Selsoviet Rural Settlement
- Time zone: UTC+3 (MSK)
- Postal code(s): 307223
- Dialing code(s): +7 47131
- OKTMO ID: 38621425131
- Website: костельцевский-сельсовет.рф

Zhmakino (Russian: Жмакино) is a rural locality (Russian: деревня, lit. 'village') in Kosteltsevsky Selsoviet Rural Settlement, Kurchatovsky District, Kursk Oblast, Russia. Population: 121 (2010 Census); 171 (2002 Census);

== Geography ==
The village is located on the Demina River (a right tributary of the Seym), 69 km (43 mi) from the Russia–Ukraine border, 41 km (25 mi) north-west of Kursk, 13.5 km (8.4 mi) north of the district center – the town Kurchatov, 6.5 km (4.0 mi) from the selsoviet center – Kosteltsevo.

Climate

Zhmakino has a warm-summer humid continental climate (Dfb in the Köppen climate classification).

== Transport ==
Zhmakino is located 32 km (20 mi) from the federal route M-2 Crimea Highway, 13 km (8.1 mi) from the road of regional importance 38K-017 (Kursk – Lgov – Rylsk – border with Ukraine), 22 km (14 mi) from the road 38K-023 (Lgov – Konyshyovka), 3 km (1.9 mi) from the road of intermunicipal significance 38H-362 (38K-017 – Nikolayevka – Shirkovo), on the roads 38H-363 (38N-362 – Afanasyevka – Rogovo) and Kurchatov – Zhmakino – Checheviznya, 13 km (8.1 mi) from the nearest railway halt Kurchatow (railway line Lgov I — Kursk).

The rural locality is 47 km (29 mi) from Kursk Vostochny Airport, 142 km (88 mi) from Belgorod International Airport and 249 km (155 mi) from Voronezh Peter the Great Airport.
