= Faustovo, Kursk Oblast =

Rural locality in Kursk Oblast, Russia

Faustovo Фаустово
- Village
- Interactive map of Faustovo
- Location of Faustovo Faustovo (Kursk Oblast)
- Coordinates: 51°45′45″N 35°42′56″E
- Country: Russia
- Federal subject: Kursk Oblast
- Administrative district: Kurchatovsky District
- SelsovietSelsoviet: Kosteltsevsky

Population (2010 Census)
  - Total: 5
  - Estimate (2010): 5 (0%)

Municipal status
  - Municipal district: Kurchatovsky Municipal District
  - Rural settlement: Kosteltsevsky Selsoviet Rural Settlement
- Time zone: UTC+3 (MSK)
- Postal code: 307250
- Dialing code: +7 47131
- OKTMO ID: 38621425181
- Website: костельцевский-сельсовет.рф

Faustovo (Russian: Фаустово) is a rural locality (Russian: деревня, lit. 'village') in Kosteltsevsky Selsoviet Rural Settlement, Kurchatovsky District, Kursk Oblast, Russia. Population: 5 (2010 census); 6 (2002 census);

== Geography ==
The village is located on the Lomna River (a right tributary of the Seym), 72 km from the Russia–Ukraine border, 33 km west of Kursk, 12.5 km north-east of the district center – the town Kurchatov, 12.5 km from the selsoviet center – Kosteltsevo.

Climate

Faustovo has a warm-summer humid continental climate (Dfb in the Köppen climate classification).

== Transport ==
Faustovo is located 25.5 km from the federal route M-2 Crimea Highway, 10.5 km from the road of regional importance 38K-017 (Kursk – Lgov – Rylsk – border with Ukraine), 0.5 km from the road of intermunicipal significance 38H-575 (Seym River – Mosolovo – Nizhneye Soskovo), 12 km from the nearest railway halt 433 km (railway line Lgov I — Kursk).

The rural locality is situated 39 km from Kursk Vostochny Airport, 137 km from Belgorod International Airport and 242 km from Voronezh Peter the Great Airport.
