= Zolotukhino =

Zolotukhino (Russian: Золоту́хино) is the name of several inhabited localities in Russia.

== Urban localities ==
- Zolotukhino, Zolotukhinsky District, Kursk Oblast, a work settlement in Zolotukhinsky District of Kursk Oblast

== Rural localities ==
- Zolotukhino, Kirov Oblast, a village in Prosnitsky Rural Okrug of Kirovo-Chepetsky District of Kirov Oblast
- Zolotukhino, Kurchatovsky District, Kursk Oblast, a khutor in Dronyayevsky Selsoviet of Kurchatovsky District of Kursk Oblast
- Zolotukhino, Moscow Oblast, a village in Astapovskoye Rural Settlement of Lukhovitsky District of Moscow Oblast
- Zolotukhino, Cherlaksky District, Omsk Oblast, a village in Yuzhno-Podolsky Rural Okrug of Cherlaksky District of Omsk Oblast
- Zolotukhino, Pavlogradsky District, Omsk Oblast, a village in Novouralsky Rural Okrug of Pavlogradsky District of Omsk Oblast
- Zolotukhino, Krasnozorensky District, Oryol Oblast, a village in Uspensky Selsoviet of Krasnozorensky District of Oryol Oblast
- Zolotukhino, Mtsensky District, Oryol Oblast, a village in Cheremoshensky Selsoviet of Mtsensky District of Oryol Oblast
- Zolotukhino, Kunyinsky District, Pskov Oblast, a village in Kunyinsky District, Pskov Oblast
- Zolotukhino, Porkhovsky District, Pskov Oblast, a village in Porkhovsky District, Pskov Oblast
- Zolotukhino, Zabaykalsky Krai, a selo in Shilkinsky District of Zabaykalsky Krai
