= Dronyayevo, Kurchatovsky District, Kursk Oblast =

Rural locality in Kursk Oblast, Russia

Dronyayevo Дроняево
- Selo
- Interactive map of Dronyayevo
- Location of Dronyayevo Dronyayevo (Kursk Oblast)
- Coordinates: 51°42′47″N 35°37′04″E
- Country: Russia
- Federal subject: Kursk Oblast
- Administrative district: Kurchatovsky District
- SelsovietSelsoviet: Makarovsky

Population (2010 Census)
  - Total: 289
  - Estimate (2010): 289 (0%)

Municipal status
  - Municipal district: Kurchatovsky Municipal District
  - Rural settlement: Makarovsky Selsoviet Rural Settlement
- Time zone: UTC+3 (MSK)
- Postal code: 307221
- Dialing code: +7 47131
- OKTMO ID: 38621422121
- Website: макаровский-сельсовет.рф

Dronyayevo (Russian: Дроняево) is a rural locality (Russian: село, lit. 'village') in Makarovsky Selsoviet Rural Settlement, Kurchatovsky District, Kursk Oblast, Russia. Population: 289 (2010 census); 403 (2002 census);

== Geography ==
The village is located on the Seym River and its tributary, the Demina, 63 km from the Russia–Ukraine border, 40 km west of Kursk, 7 km north-west of the district center – the town Kurchatov, 7 km from the selsoviet center – Makarovka.

Climate

Dronyayevo has a warm-summer humid continental climate (Dfb in the Köppen climate classification).

Climate data for Dronyayevo
| Month | Jan | Feb | Mar | Apr | May | Jun | Jul | Aug | Sep | Oct | Nov | Dec | Year |
|---|---|---|---|---|---|---|---|---|---|---|---|---|---|
| Mean daily maximum °C (°F) | −4 (25) | −3 (27) | 2.9 (37.2) | 13.1 (55.6) | 19.4 (66.9) | 22.6 (72.7) | 25.2 (77.4) | 24.5 (76.1) | 18.2 (64.8) | 10.6 (51.1) | 3.4 (38.1) | −1.1 (30.0) | 11.0 (51.8) |
| Daily mean °C (°F) | −6.1 (21.0) | −5.6 (21.9) | −0.7 (30.7) | 8.3 (46.9) | 14.7 (58.5) | 18.3 (64.9) | 20.9 (69.6) | 20 (68) | 14 (57) | 7.3 (45.1) | 1.2 (34.2) | −3.1 (26.4) | 7.4 (45.4) |
| Mean daily minimum °C (°F) | −8.5 (16.7) | −8.6 (16.5) | −4.8 (23.4) | 2.8 (37.0) | 9.1 (48.4) | 13 (55) | 15.8 (60.4) | 14.9 (58.8) | 9.8 (49.6) | 4 (39) | −1.1 (30.0) | −5.3 (22.5) | 3.4 (38.1) |
| Average precipitation mm (inches) | 51 (2.0) | 45 (1.8) | 48 (1.9) | 51 (2.0) | 63 (2.5) | 71 (2.8) | 76 (3.0) | 55 (2.2) | 58 (2.3) | 58 (2.3) | 48 (1.9) | 49 (1.9) | 673 (26.6) |
Source: https://en.climate-data.org/asia/russian-federation/kursk-oblast/дроняево-656083/

== Transport ==
Dronyayevo is located 31 km from the federal route M-2 Crimea Highway, 6 km from the road of regional importance 38K-017 (Kursk – Lgov – Rylsk – border with Ukraine), 2 km from the road of intermunicipal significance 38H-362 (38K-017 – Nikolayevka – Shirkovo), on the road 38H-364 (38N-362 – Dronyayevo), 6 km from the nearest railway halt Kurchatow (railway line Lgov I — Kursk).

The rural locality is situated 46 km from Kursk Vostochny Airport, 134 km from Belgorod International Airport and 249 km from Voronezh Peter the Great Airport.
