= Berezutskoye =

Rural locality in Kursk Oblast, Russia

Berezutskoye Березуцкое
- Village
- Interactive map of Berezutskoye
- Location of Berezutskoye Berezutskoye (Kursk Oblast)
- Coordinates: 51°44′42″N 35°44′21″E
- Country: Russia
- Federal subject: Kursk Oblast
- Administrative district: Kurchatovsky District
- SelsovietSelsoviet: Kosteltsevsky

Population (2010 Census)
  - Total: 14
  - Estimate (2010): 14 (0%)

Municipal status
  - Municipal district: Kurchatovsky Municipal District
  - Rural settlement: Kosteltsevsky Selsoviet Rural Settlement
- Time zone: UTC+3 (MSK)
- Postal code: 307250
- Dialing code: +7 47131
- OKTMO ID: 38621425141
- Website: костельцевский-сельсовет.рф

Berezutskoye (Russian: Березуцкое) is a rural locality (Russian: деревня, lit. 'village') in Kosteltsevsky Selsoviet Rural Settlement, Kurchatovsky District, Kursk Oblast, Russia. Population: 14 (2010 census); 19 (2002 census);

== Geography ==
The village is located on the Lomna River (a right tributary of the Seym), 71 km from the Russia–Ukraine border, 31 km west of Kursk, 12 km north-east of the district center – the town Kurchatov, 15 km from the selsoviet center – Kosteltsevo.

Climate

Berezutskoye has a warm-summer humid continental climate (Dfb in the Köppen climate classification).

Climate data for Berezutskoye
Month	Jan	Feb	Mar	Apr	May	Jun	Jul	Aug	Sep	Oct	Nov	Dec	Year
Mean daily maximum °C (°F)	−4.1 (24.6)	−3.1 (26.4)	2.8 (37.0)	13 (55)	19.4 (66.9)	22.6 (72.7)	25.2 (77.4)	24.5 (76.1)	18.2 (64.8)	10.5 (50.9)	3.4 (38.1)	−1.2 (29.8)	10.9 (51.6)
Daily mean °C (°F)	−6.1 (21.0)	−5.6 (21.9)	−0.8 (30.6)	8.2 (46.8)	14.7 (58.5)	18.3 (64.9)	20.9 (69.6)	20 (68)	14 (57)	7.3 (45.1)	1.2 (34.2)	−3.1 (26.4)	7.4 (45.3)
Mean daily minimum °C (°F)	−8.6 (16.5)	−8.7 (16.3)	−4.9 (23.2)	2.8 (37.0)	9.1 (48.4)	13 (55)	15.8 (60.4)	14.8 (58.6)	9.7 (49.5)	4 (39)	−1.2 (29.8)	−5.3 (22.5)	3.4 (38.0)
Average precipitation mm (inches)	52 (2.0)	45 (1.8)	48 (1.9)	51 (2.0)	63 (2.5)	72 (2.8)	75 (3.0)	56 (2.2)	59 (2.3)	59 (2.3)	48 (1.9)	49 (1.9)	677 (26.6)
Source: https://en.climate-data.org/asia/russian-federation/kursk-oblast/березуцкое-672841/

== Transport ==
Berezutskoye is located 23 km from the federal route M-2 Crimea Highway, 8.5 km from the road of regional importance 38K-017 (Kursk – Lgov – Rylsk – border with Ukraine), on the road of intermunicipal significance 38H-803 (Nizhneye Soskovo – Gardens near the village of Berezutskoye), 10 km from the nearest railway halt 433 km (railway line Lgov I — Kursk).

The rural locality is situated 37,5 km from Kursk Vostochny Airport, 134 km from Belgorod International Airport and 241 km from Voronezh Peter the Great Airport.
