= Uspenka, Kurchatovsky District, Kursk Oblast =

Rural locality in Kursk Oblast, Russia

Uspenka Успенка
- Selo
- Interactive map of Uspenka
- Location of Uspenka Uspenka (Kursk Oblast)
- Coordinates: 51°39′32″N 35°42′12″E
- Country: Russia
- Federal subject: Kursk Oblast
- Administrative district: Kurchatovsky District
- SelsovietSelsoviet: Dichnyansky
- Elevation: 159 m (522 ft)

Population (2010 Census)
  - Total: 524
  - Estimate (2010): 524 (0%)

Municipal status
  - Municipal district: Kurchatovsky Municipal District
  - Rural settlement: Dichnyansky Selsoviet Rural Settlement
- Time zone: UTC+3 (MSK)
- Postal code: 307236
- Dialing code: +7 47131
- OKTMO ID: 38621442111

Uspenka (Russian: Успенка) is a rural locality (a selo) in Dichnyansky Selsoviet Rural Settlement, Kurchatovsky District, Kursk Oblast, Russia. Population: 524 (2010 census); 201 (2002 census);

== Geography ==
The selo is located in the Dichnya River basin (a tributary of the Seym River), 35 km south-west of Kursk, 3.5 km east of the district center – the town Kurchatov, 1.5 km from the selsoviet center – Dichnya. Uspenka is 159 m above sea level.

Climate

Uspenka has a warm-summer humid continental climate (Dfb in the Köppen climate classification).

Climate data for Uspenka
Month	Jan	Feb	Mar	Apr	May	Jun	Jul	Aug	Sep	Oct	Nov	Dec	Year
Mean daily maximum °C (°F)	−4.1 (24.6)	−3.1 (26.4)	2.8 (37.0)	13 (55)	19.4 (66.9)	22.6 (72.7)	25.2 (77.4)	24.5 (76.1)	18.2 (64.8)	10.5 (50.9)	3.4 (38.1)	−1.2 (29.8)	10.9 (51.6)
Daily mean °C (°F)	−6.1 (21.0)	−5.6 (21.9)	−0.8 (30.6)	8.2 (46.8)	14.7 (58.5)	18.3 (64.9)	20.9 (69.6)	20 (68)	14 (57)	7.3 (45.1)	1.2 (34.2)	−3.1 (26.4)	7.4 (45.3)
Mean daily minimum °C (°F)	−8.6 (16.5)	−8.7 (16.3)	−4.9 (23.2)	2.8 (37.0)	9.1 (48.4)	13 (55)	15.8 (60.4)	14.8 (58.6)	9.7 (49.5)	4 (39)	−1.2 (29.8)	−5.3 (22.5)	3.4 (38.0)
Average precipitation mm (inches)	52 (2.0)	45 (1.8)	48 (1.9)	51 (2.0)	63 (2.5)	72 (2.8)	75 (3.0)	56 (2.2)	59 (2.3)	59 (2.3)	48 (1.9)	49 (1.9)	677 (26.6)
Source: https://en.climate-data.org/asia/russian-federation/kursk-oblast/успенка-926793/

== Transport ==
Uspenka is located 25 km from the federal route M-2 Crimea Highway, on the road of regional importance 38K-017 (Kursk – Lgov – Rylsk – border with Ukraine), 7.5 km from the road 38K-010 (M2 – Ivanino), 1.5 km from the road of intermunicipal significance 38H-357 (38K-017 – Lukashevka), 1.5 km from the nearest railway halt 428 km (railway line Lgov I — Kursk).

The rural locality is situated 41 km from Kursk Vostochny Airport, 127 km from Belgorod International Airport and 244 km from Voronezh Peter the Great Airport.
