= Zaprutye, Kursk Oblast =

Rural locality in Kursk Oblast, Russia

Zaprutye Запрутье
- Village
- Interactive map of Zaprutye
- Location of Zaprutye Zaprutye (Kursk Oblast)
- Coordinates: 51°50′01″N 35°33′09″E
- Country: Russia
- Federal subject: Kursk Oblast
- Administrative district: Kurchatovsky District
- SelsovietSelsoviet: Kosteltsevsky

Population (2010 Census)
  - Total: 60
  - Estimate (2010): 60 (0%)

Municipal status
  - Municipal district: Kurchatovsky Municipal District
  - Rural settlement: Kosteltsevsky Selsoviet Rural Settlement
- Time zone: UTC+3 (MSK)
- Postal code: 307224
- Dialing code: +7 47131
- OKTMO ID: 38621425116
- Website: костельцевский-сельсовет.рф

Zaprutye (Russian: Запрутье) is a rural locality (Russian: деревня, lit. 'village') in Kosteltsevsky Selsoviet Rural Settlement, Kurchatovsky District, Kursk Oblast, Russia. Population: 60 (2010 census); 89 (2002 census);

== Geography ==
The village is located on the Prutishche River in the basin of the Seym, 73 km (45 mi) from the Russia–Ukraine border, 46 km (29 mi) north-west of Kursk, 21 km (13 mi) north-west of the district center – the town Kurchatov, 1 km (0.62 mi) from the selsoviet center – Kosteltsevo.

Climate

Zaprutye has a warm-summer humid continental climate (Dfb in the Köppen climate classification).

Climate data for Zaprutye
Month	Jan	Feb	Mar	Apr	May	Jun	Jul	Aug	Sep	Oct	Nov	Dec	Year
Mean daily maximum °C (°F)	−4.1 (24.6)	−3.2 (26.2)	2.6 (36.7)	12.9 (55.2)	19.1 (66.4)	22.4 (72.3)	25 (77)	24.3 (75.7)	18 (64)	10.4 (50.7)	3.3 (37.9)	−1.2 (29.8)	10.8 (51.4)
Daily mean °C (°F)	−6.2 (20.8)	−5.7 (21.7)	−0.9 (30.4)	8.1 (46.6)	14.5 (58.1)	18.1 (64.6)	20.7 (69.3)	19.8 (67.6)	13.8 (56.8)	7.2 (45.0)	1.1 (34.0)	−3.1 (26.4)	7.3 (45.1)
Mean daily minimum °C (°F)	−8.6 (16.5)	−8.7 (16.3)	−5 (23)	2.6 (36.7)	8.9 (48.0)	12.8 (55.0)	15.7 (60.3)	14.7 (58.5)	9.6 (49.3)	3.9 (39.0)	−1.2 (29.8)	−5.3 (22.5)	3.3 (37.9)
Average precipitation mm (inches)	51 (2.0)	45 (1.8)	48 (1.9)	51 (2.0)	63 (2.5)	71 (2.8)	76 (3.0)	55 (2.2)	58 (2.3)	58 (2.3)	48 (1.9)	49 (1.9)	673 (26.6)
Source: https://en.climate-data.org/asia/russian-federation/kursk-oblast/запрутье-662737/

== Transport ==
Zaprutye is located 31 km (19 mi) from the federal route M-2 Crimea Highway, 20 km (12 mi) from the road of regional importance 38K-017 (Kursk – Lgov – Rylsk – border with Ukraine), 16 km (9.9 mi) from the road 38K-023 (Lgov – Konyshyovka), 3 km (1.9 mi) from the road of intermunicipal significance 38H-362 (38K-017 – Nikolayevka – Shirkovo), on the road 38H-365 (38N-362 – Kosteltsevo – Zaprutye), 18 km (11 mi) from the nearest railway station Konyshyovka (railway line Navlya – Lgov-Kiyevsky).

The rural locality is situated 51 km (32 mi) from Kursk Vostochny Airport, 149 km (93 mi) from Belgorod International Airport and 253 km (157 mi) from Voronezh Peter the Great Airport.
