= Nizhnyaya Gorbulina =

Rural locality in Kursk Oblast, Russia

Nizhnyaya Gorbulina Нижняя Горбулина
- Village
- Interactive map of Nizhnyaya Gorbulina
- Location of Nizhnyaya Gorbulina Nizhnyaya Gorbulina (Kursk Oblast)
- Coordinates: 51°42′39″N 35°49′43″E
- Country: Russia
- Federal subject: Kursk Oblast
- Administrative district: Oktyabrsky District
- SelsovietSelsoviet: Dolzhenkovsky

Population (2010 Census)
  - Total: 72
  - Estimate (2010): 72 (0%)

Municipal status
  - Municipal district: Oktyabrsky Municipal District
  - Rural settlement: Dolzhenkovsky Selsoviet Rural Settlement
- Time zone: UTC+3 (MSK)
- Postal code: 307210
- Dialing code: +7 47142
- OKTMO ID: 38628408126
- Website: bolshedol.rkursk.ru

Nizhnyaya Gorbulina (Russian: Нижняя Горбулина) is a rural locality (Russian: деревня, lit. 'village') in Dolzhenkovsky Selsoviet Rural Settlement, Oktyabrsky District, Kursk Oblast, Russia. Population: 72 (2010 census); 73 (2002 census);

== Geography ==
The village is located on the Rogozna River (a right tributary of the Seym River), 72 km from the Russia–Ukraine border, 21 km west of Kursk, 8 km north-west of the district center – the urban-type settlement Pryamitsyno, 1 km from the selsoviet center – Bolshoye Dolzhenkovo.

Climate

Nizhnyaya Gorbulina has a warm-summer humid continental climate (Dfb in the Köppen climate classification).

== Transport ==
Nizhnyaya Gorbulina is located 16.5 km from the federal route M-2 Crimea Highway (a part of the European route E105), 6.5 km from the road of regional importance 38K-017 (Kursk – Lgov – Rylsk – border with Ukraine), 2 km from the road of intermunicipal significance 38H-073 (Dyakonovo – Starkovo – Sokolovka), 1 km from the road 38H-074 (38N-073 – Bolshoye Dolzhenkovo via Avdeyeva), on the road 38H-745 (38N-074 – Nizhnyaya Gorbulina – Verkhnyaya Gorbulina), 8.5 km from the nearest railway halt 439 km (railway line Lgov I — Kursk).

The rural locality is situated 32 km from Kursk Vostochny Airport, 128 km from Belgorod International Airport and 235 km from Voronezh Peter the Great Airport.
