= Sorokina, Kursk Oblast =

Rural locality in Kursk Oblast, Russia

Sorokina Сорокина
- Village
- Interactive map of Sorokina
- Location of Sorokina Sorokina (Kursk Oblast)
- Coordinates: 51°42′17″N 35°45′26″E
- Country: Russia
- Federal subject: Kursk Oblast
- Administrative district: Oktyabrsky District
- SelsovietSelsoviet: Dolzhenkovsky

Population (2010 Census)
  - Total: 33
  - Estimate (2010): 33 (0%)

Municipal status
  - Municipal district: Oktyabrsky Municipal District
  - Rural settlement: Dolzhenkovsky Selsoviet Rural Settlement
- Time zone: UTC+3 (MSK)
- Postal code: 307211
- Dialing code: +7 47142
- OKTMO ID: 38628408141
- Website: bolshedol.rkursk.ru

Sorokina (Russian: Сорокина) is a rural locality (Russian: деревня, lit. 'village') in Dolzhenkovsky Selsoviet Rural Settlement, Oktyabrsky District, Kursk Oblast, Russia. Population: 33 (2010 census); 61 (2002 census);

== Geography ==
The village is located on the Lomna River (a right tributary of the Seym), 69 km from the Russia–Ukraine border, 26 km west of Kursk, 12 km north-west of the district center – the urban-type settlement Pryamitsyno, 5.5 km from the selsoviet center – Bolshoye Dolzhenkovo.

Climate

Sorokina has a warm-summer humid continental climate (Dfb in the Köppen climate classification).

== Transport ==
Sorokina is located 21 km from the federal route M-2 Crimea Highway (a part of the European route E105), 4.5 km from the road of regional importance 38K-017 (Kursk – Lgov – Rylsk – border with Ukraine), 1 km from the road of intermunicipal significance 38H-576 (38N-575 – Zolotukhino), 6 km from the nearest railway halt 433 km (railway line Lgov I — Kursk).

The rural locality is situated 33 km from Kursk Vostochny Airport, 131 km from Belgorod International Airport and 241 km from Voronezh Peter the Great Airport.
