= Lipina, Kursk Oblast =

Rural locality in Kursk Oblast, Russia

Lipina Липина
- Village
- Interactive map of Lipina
- Location of Lipina Lipina (Kursk Oblast)
- Coordinates: 51°40′15″N 35°49′29″E
- Country: Russia
- Federal subject: Kursk Oblast
- Administrative district: Oktyabrsky District
- SelsovietSelsoviet: Dolzhenkovsky

Population (2010 Census)
  - Total: 157
  - Estimate (2010): 157 (0%)

Municipal status
  - Municipal district: Oktyabrsky Municipal District
  - Rural settlement: Dolzhenkovsky Selsoviet Rural Settlement
- Time zone: UTC+3 (MSK)
- Postal code: 307211
- Dialing code: +7 47142
- OKTMO ID: 38628408121
- Website: bolshedol.rkursk.ru

Lipina (Russian: Липина) is a rural locality (Russian: деревня, lit. 'village') in Dolzhenkovsky Selsoviet Rural Settlement, Oktyabrsky District, Kursk Oblast, Russia. Population: 157 (2010 census); 206 (2002 census);

== Geography ==
The village is located on the Seym River (a left tributary of the Desna), 69 km from the Russia–Ukraine border, 21 km south-west of Kursk, 6 km north-west of the district center – the urban-type settlement Pryamitsyno, 3.5 km from the selsoviet center – Bolshoye Dolzhenkovo.

Climate

Lipina has a warm-summer humid continental climate (Dfb in the Köppen climate classification).

== Transport ==
Lipina is located 16 km from the federal route M-2 Crimea Highway (a part of the European route E105), 2.5 km from the road of regional importance 38K-017 (Kursk – Lgov – Rylsk – border with Ukraine), 3 km from the road of intermunicipal significance 38H-073 (Dyakonovo – Starkovo – Sokolovka), on the road 38H-074 (38N-073 – Bolshoye Dolzhenkovo via Avdeyeva), 4 km from the nearest railway halt 439 km (railway line Lgov I — Kursk).

The rural locality is situated 33 km from Kursk Vostochny Airport, 124 km from Belgorod International Airport and 235 km from Voronezh Peter the Great Airport.
