= Nizhnyaya Plaksina =

Rural locality in Kursk Oblast, Russia

Nizhnyaya Plaksina Нижняя Плаксина
- Village
- Interactive map of Nizhnyaya Plaksina
- Location of Nizhnyaya Plaksina Nizhnyaya Plaksina (Kursk Oblast)
- Coordinates: 51°43′10″N 35°44′54″E
- Country: Russia
- Federal subject: Kursk Oblast
- Administrative district: Oktyabrsky District
- SelsovietSelsoviet: Dolzhenkovsky

Population (2010 Census)
  - Total: 10
  - Estimate (2010): 10 (0%)

Municipal status
  - Municipal district: Oktyabrsky Municipal District
  - Rural settlement: Dolzhenkovsky Selsoviet Rural Settlement
- Time zone: UTC+3 (MSK)
- Postal code: 307211
- Dialing code: +7 47142
- OKTMO ID: 38628408131
- Website: bolshedol.rkursk.ru

Nizhnyaya Plaksina (Russian: Нижняя Плаксина) is a rural locality (Russian: деревня, lit. 'village') in Dolzhenkovsky Selsoviet Rural Settlement, Oktyabrsky District, Kursk Oblast, Russia. Population: 10 (2010 census); 32 (2002 census);

== Geography ==
The village is located on the Lomna River (a right tributary of the Seym), 69 km from the Russia–Ukraine border, 26 km west of Kursk, 14 km north-west of the district center – the urban-type settlement Pryamitsyno, 6 km from the selsoviet center – Bolshoye Dolzhenkovo.

Climate

Nizhnyaya Plaksina has a warm-summer humid continental climate (Dfb in the Köppen climate classification).

== Transport ==
Nizhnyaya Plaksina is located 22 km from the federal route M-2 Crimea Highway (a part of the European route E105), 6 km from the road of regional importance 38K-017 (Kursk – Lgov – Rylsk – border with Ukraine), 2 km from the road of intermunicipal significance 38H-576 (38N-575 – Zolotukhino), 7.5 km from the nearest railway halt 433 km (railway line Lgov I — Kursk).

The rural locality is situated 33 km from Kursk Vostochny Airport, 131 km from Belgorod International Airport and 241 km from Voronezh Peter the Great Airport.
