= Afanasyevka, Kurchatovsky District, Kursk Oblast =

Rural locality in Kursk Oblast, Russia

Afanasyevka Афанасьевка
- Selo
- Interactive map of Afanasyevka
- Location of Afanasyevka Afanasyevka (Kursk Oblast)
- Coordinates: 51°45′48″N 35°36′49″E
- Country: Russia
- Federal subject: Kursk Oblast
- Administrative district: Kurchatovsky District
- SelsovietSelsoviet: Kosteltsevsky

Population (2010 Census)
  - Total: 22
  - Estimate (2010): 22 (0%)

Municipal status
  - Municipal district: Kurchatovsky Municipal District
  - Rural settlement: Kosteltsevsky Selsoviet Rural Settlement
- Time zone: UTC+3 (MSK)
- Postal code: 307223
- Dialing code: +7 47131
- OKTMO ID: 38621425136
- Website: костельцевский-сельсовет.рф

Afanasyevka (Russian: Афанасьевка) is a rural locality (Russian: село, lit. 'village') in Kosteltsevsky Selsoviet Rural Settlement, Kurchatovsky District, Kursk Oblast, Russia. Population: 22 (2010 census); 31 (2002 census);

== Geography ==
The village is located on the Demina River (a right tributary of the Seym), 68 km from the Russia–Ukraine border, 40 km west of Kursk, 12 km north of the district center – the town Kurchatov, 8 km from the selsoviet center – Kosteltsevo.

Climate

Afanasyevka has a warm-summer humid continental climate (Dfb in the Köppen climate classification).

== Transport ==
Afanasyevka is located 32 km from the federal route M-2 Crimea Highway, 11.5 km from the road of regional importance 38K-017 (Kursk – Lgov – Rylsk – border with Ukraine), 23 km from the road 38K-023 (Lgov – Konyshyovka), 3.5 km from the road of intermunicipal significance 38H-362 (38K-017 – Nikolayevka – Shirkovo), on the road 38H-363 (38N-362 – Afanasyevka – Rogovo), 22 km from the nearest railway halt 565 km (railway line Navlya – Lgov-Kiyevsky).

The rural locality is situated 46 km from Kursk Vostochny Airport, 140 km from Belgorod International Airport and 249 km from Voronezh Peter the Great Airport.
