= Rogovo =

Rogovo is the name of several rural localities in Russia, including:

- Rogovo, Bryansk Oblast
- Rogovo, Kursk Oblast
- Rogovo, Vladimir Oblast

== See also ==
- Rugova Canyon, a river canyon in Kosovo sometimes known as Rogovo Canyon
