= Verkhnyaya Gorbulina =

Rural locality in Kursk Oblast, Russia

Verkhnyaya Gorbulina Верхняя Горбулина
- Village
- Interactive map of Verkhnyaya Gorbulina
- Location of Verkhnyaya Gorbulina Verkhnyaya Gorbulina (Kursk Oblast)
- Coordinates: 51°43′32″N 35°49′14″E
- Country: Russia
- Federal subject: Kursk Oblast
- Administrative district: Oktyabrsky District
- SelsovietSelsoviet: Dolzhenkovsky

Population (2010 Census)
  - Total: 71
  - Estimate (2010): 71 (0%)

Municipal status
  - Municipal district: Oktyabrsky Municipal District
  - Rural settlement: Dolzhenkovsky Selsoviet Rural Settlement
- Time zone: UTC+3 (MSK)
- Postal code: 307210
- Dialing code: +7 47142
- OKTMO ID: 38628408116
- Website: bolshedol.rkursk.ru

Verkhnyaya Gorbulina (Russian: Верхняя Горбулина) is a rural locality (Russian: деревня, lit. 'village') in Dolzhenkovsky Selsoviet Rural Settlement, Oktyabrsky District, Kursk Oblast, Russia. Population: 71 (2010 census); 108 (2002 census);

== Geography ==
The village is located on the Rogozna River (a right tributary of the Seym River), 73 km from the Russia–Ukraine border, 21 km west of Kursk, 10 km north-west of the district center – the urban-type settlement Pryamitsyno, 1 km from the selsoviet center – Bolshoye Dolzhenkovo.

Climate

Verkhnyaya Gorbulina has a warm-summer humid continental climate (Dfb in the Köppen climate classification).

== Transport ==
Verkhnyaya Gorbulina is located 17 km from the federal route M-2 Crimea Highway (a part of the European route E105), 8 km from the road of regional importance 38K-017 (Kursk – Lgov – Rylsk – border with Ukraine), 2 km from the road of intermunicipal significance 38H-073 (Dyakonovo – Starkovo – Sokolovka), 1 km from the road 38H-074 (38N-073 – Bolshoye Dolzhenkovo via Avdeyeva), on the road 38H-745 (38N-074 – Nizhnyaya Gorbulina – Verkhnyaya Gorbulina), 10 km from the nearest railway halt 433 km (railway line Lgov I — Kursk).

The rural locality is situated 32 km from Kursk Vostochny Airport, 130 km from Belgorod International Airport and 236 km from Voronezh Peter the Great Airport.
