= Dronyayevo =

Dronyayevo, (Russian: Дроняево) may refer to:

- Dronyayevo, Kursky District, Kursk Oblast, a village in Kursk Oblast, Russia
- Dronyayevo, Kurchatovsky District, Kursk Oblast, a village (selo) in Kursk Oblast, Russia
