= Ozerovo =

Ozerovo (Russian: Озерово) is the name of several rural localities in Russia:

- Ozerovo, Belgorod Oblast, a selo in Yakovlevsky District of Belgorod Oblast
- Ozerovo, Kaliningrad Oblast, a settlement in Kovrovsky Rural Okrug of Zelenogradsky District of Kaliningrad Oblast
- Ozerovo, Kostroma Oblast, a village in Chukhlomskoye Settlement of Chukhlomsky District of Kostroma Oblast
- Ozerovo, Kursk Oblast, a village in Shestopalovsky Selsoviet of Zolotukhinsky District of Kursk Oblast
- Ozerovo, Oryol Oblast, a village in Arkhangelsky Selsoviet of Uritsky District of Oryol Oblast
- Ozerovo, Ostrovsky District, Pskov Oblast, a village in Ostrovsky District, Pskov Oblast
- Ozerovo, Strugo-Krasnensky District, Pskov Oblast, a village in Strugo-Krasnensky District, Pskov Oblast
