= Zolotukhinsky =

Zolotukhinsky (masculine), Zolotukhinskaya (feminine), or Zolotukhinskoye (neuter) may refer to:

- Zolotukhinsky District, a district of Kursk Oblast, Russia
- Zolotukhinsky (rural locality), a rural locality (a settlement) in Tambov Oblast, Russia
