= Dichnya =

Dichnya (Russian: Дичня) is the name of rural localities and rivers in Russia:

- Dichnya, Kursk Oblast, a selo and the administrative center of Dichnyansky Selsoviet Rural Settlement, Kurchatovsky District, Kursk Oblast
- Dichnya, Oryol Oblast, a selo in Turovsky Selsoviet Rural Settlement, Verkhovsky District, Oryol Oblast
- Dichnya (a tributary of the Seym), a river, a tributary of the Seym River in Kursk Oblast
- Dichnya (a tributary of the Pshevka), a river, a tributary of the Pshevka River in Oryol Oblast
