= Lukashevka, Kursk Oblast =

Rural locality in Kursk Oblast, Russia

Lukashevka Лукашевка
- Village
- Interactive map of Lukashevka
- Location of Lukashevka Lukashevka (Kursk Oblast)
- Coordinates: 51°36′32″N 35°40′50″E
- Country: Russia
- Federal subject: Kursk Oblast
- Administrative district: Kurchatovsky District
- SelsovietSelsoviet: Dichnyansky

Population (2010 Census)
  - Total: 111
  - Estimate (2010): 111 (0%)

Municipal status
  - Municipal district: Kurchatovsky Municipal District
  - Rural settlement: Dichnyansky Selsoviet Rural Settlement
- Time zone: UTC+3 (MSK)
- Postal code: 307236
- Dialing code: +7 47131
- OKTMO ID: 38621442106

Lukashevka (Russian: Лукашевка) is a rural locality (a village) in Dichnyansky Selsoviet Rural Settlement, Kurchatovsky District, Kursk Oblast, Russia. Population: 111 (2010 census); 73 (2002 census);

== Geography ==
The village is located in the Dichnya River basin (a tributary of the Seym River), 38 km south-west of Kursk, 5.5 km east of the district center – the town Kurchatov, 6.5 km from the selsoviet center – Dichnya.

Climate

Lukashevka has a warm-summer humid continental climate (Dfb in the Köppen climate classification).

== Transport ==
Lukashevka is located 28 km from the federal route M-2 Crimea Highway, 5 km from the road of regional importance 38K-017 (Kursk – Lgov – Rylsk – border with Ukraine), 2.5 km from the road 38K-010 (M2 – Ivanino), on the road of intermunicipal significance 38H-357 (38K-017 – Lukashevka), 4.5 km from the nearest railway halt 428 km (railway line Lgov I — Kursk).

The rural locality is situated 45 km from Kursk Vostochny Airport, 123 km from Belgorod International Airport and 246 km from Voronezh Peter the Great Airport.
