= Rogovo, Kursk Oblast =

Rural locality in Kursk Oblast, Russia

Rogovo Рогово
- Village
- Interactive map of Rogovo
- Location of Rogovo Rogovo (Kursk Oblast)
- Coordinates: 51°47′54″N 35°36′41″E
- Country: Russia
- Federal subject: Kursk Oblast
- Administrative district: Kurchatovsky District
- SelsovietSelsoviet: Kosteltsevsky

Population (2010 Census)
  - Total: 57
  - Estimate (2010): 57 (0%)

Municipal status
  - Municipal district: Kurchatovsky Municipal District
  - Rural settlement: Kosteltsevsky Selsoviet Rural Settlement
- Time zone: UTC+3 (MSK)
- Postal code: 307223
- Dialing code: +7 47131
- OKTMO ID: 38621425171
- Website: костельцевский-сельсовет.рф

Rogovo (Russian: Рогово) is a rural locality (Russian: деревня, lit. 'village') in Kosteltsevsky Selsoviet Rural Settlement, Kurchatovsky District, Kursk Oblast, Russia. Population: 57 (2010 census); 122 (2002 census);

== Geography ==
The village is located on the Demina River (a right tributary of the Seym), 71 km from the Russia–Ukraine border, 41 km north-west of Kursk, 16 km north of the district center – the town Kurchatov, 4.5 km from the selsoviet center – Kosteltsevo.

Climate

Rogovo has a warm-summer humid continental climate (Dfb in the Köppen climate classification).

Climate data for Rogovo
Month	Jan	Feb	Mar	Apr	May	Jun	Jul	Aug	Sep	Oct	Nov	Dec	Year
Mean daily maximum °C (°F)	−4.1 (24.6)	−3.2 (26.2)	2.6 (36.7)	12.9 (55.2)	19.1 (66.4)	22.4 (72.3)	25 (77)	24.3 (75.7)	18 (64)	10.4 (50.7)	3.3 (37.9)	−1.2 (29.8)	10.8 (51.4)
Daily mean °C (°F)	−6.2 (20.8)	−5.7 (21.7)	−0.9 (30.4)	8.1 (46.6)	14.5 (58.1)	18.1 (64.6)	20.7 (69.3)	19.8 (67.6)	13.8 (56.8)	7.2 (45.0)	1.1 (34.0)	−3.1 (26.4)	7.3 (45.1)
Mean daily minimum °C (°F)	−8.6 (16.5)	−8.7 (16.3)	−5 (23)	2.6 (36.7)	8.9 (48.0)	12.8 (55.0)	15.7 (60.3)	14.7 (58.5)	9.6 (49.3)	3.9 (39.0)	−1.2 (29.8)	−5.3 (22.5)	3.3 (37.9)
Average precipitation mm (inches)	51 (2.0)	45 (1.8)	48 (1.9)	51 (2.0)	63 (2.5)	71 (2.8)	76 (3.0)	55 (2.2)	58 (2.3)	58 (2.3)	48 (1.9)	49 (1.9)	673 (26.6)
Source: https://en.climate-data.org/asia/russian-federation/kursk-oblast/рогово-667974/

== Transport ==
Rogovo is located 31 km from the federal route M-2 Crimea Highway, 15 km from the road of regional importance 38K-017 (Kursk – Lgov – Rylsk – border with Ukraine), 22 km from the road 38K-023 (Lgov – Konyshyovka), 2 km from the road of intermunicipal significance 38H-362 (38K-017 – Nikolayevka – Shirkovo), on the road 38H-363 (38N-362 – Afanasyevka – Rogovo), 15 km from the nearest railway halt Kurchatow (railway line Lgov I — Kursk).

The rural locality is situated 47 km from Kursk Vostochny Airport, 143 km from Belgorod International Airport and 250 km from Voronezh Peter the Great Airport.
