= Zolotukhino, Kurchatovsky District, Kursk Oblast =

Rural locality in Kursk Oblast, Russia

Zolotukhino Золотухино
- Khutor
- Interactive map of Zolotukhino
- Location of Zolotukhino Zolotukhino (Kursk Oblast)
- Coordinates: 51°42′09″N 35°45′16″E
- Country: Russia
- Federal subject: Kursk Oblast
- Administrative district: Kurchatovsky District
- SelsovietSelsoviet: Makarovsky

Population (2010 Census)
  - Total: 7
  - Estimate (2010): 7 (0%)

Municipal status
  - Municipal district: Kurchatovsky Municipal District
  - Rural settlement: Makarovsky Selsoviet Rural Settlement
- Time zone: UTC+3 (MSK)
- Postal code: 307221
- Dialing code: +7 47131
- OKTMO ID: 38621422141
- Website: макаровский-сельсовет.рф

Zolotukhino (Russian: Золотухино) is a rural locality (a khutor) in Makarovsky Selsoviet Rural Settlement, Kurchatovsky District, Kursk Oblast, Russia. Population: 7 (2010 census); 11 (2002 census);

== Geography ==
The khutor is located on the Lomna River (a right tributary of the Seym), 68 km from the Russia–Ukraine border, 30.5 km west of Kursk, 9 km north-east of the district center – the town Kurchatov, 16 km from the selsoviet center – Makarovka.

Climate

Zolotukhino has a warm-summer humid continental climate (Dfb in the Köppen climate classification).

== Transport ==
Zolotukhino is located 21.5 km from the federal route M-2 Crimea Highway, 4 km from the road of regional importance 38K-017 (Kursk – Lgov – Rylsk – border with Ukraine), 3.5 km from the road of intermunicipal significance 38H-575 (Seym River – Mosolovo – Nizhneye Soskovo), on the road 38H-576 (38N-575 – Zolotukhino), 5.5 km from the nearest railway halt 433 km (railway line Lgov I — Kursk).

The rural locality is situated 37 km from Kursk Vostochny Airport, 130 km from Belgorod International Airport and 241 km from Voronezh Peter the Great Airport.
