= Dichnya, Kursk Oblast =

Rural locality in Kursk Oblast, Russia

Dichnya Дичня
- Selo
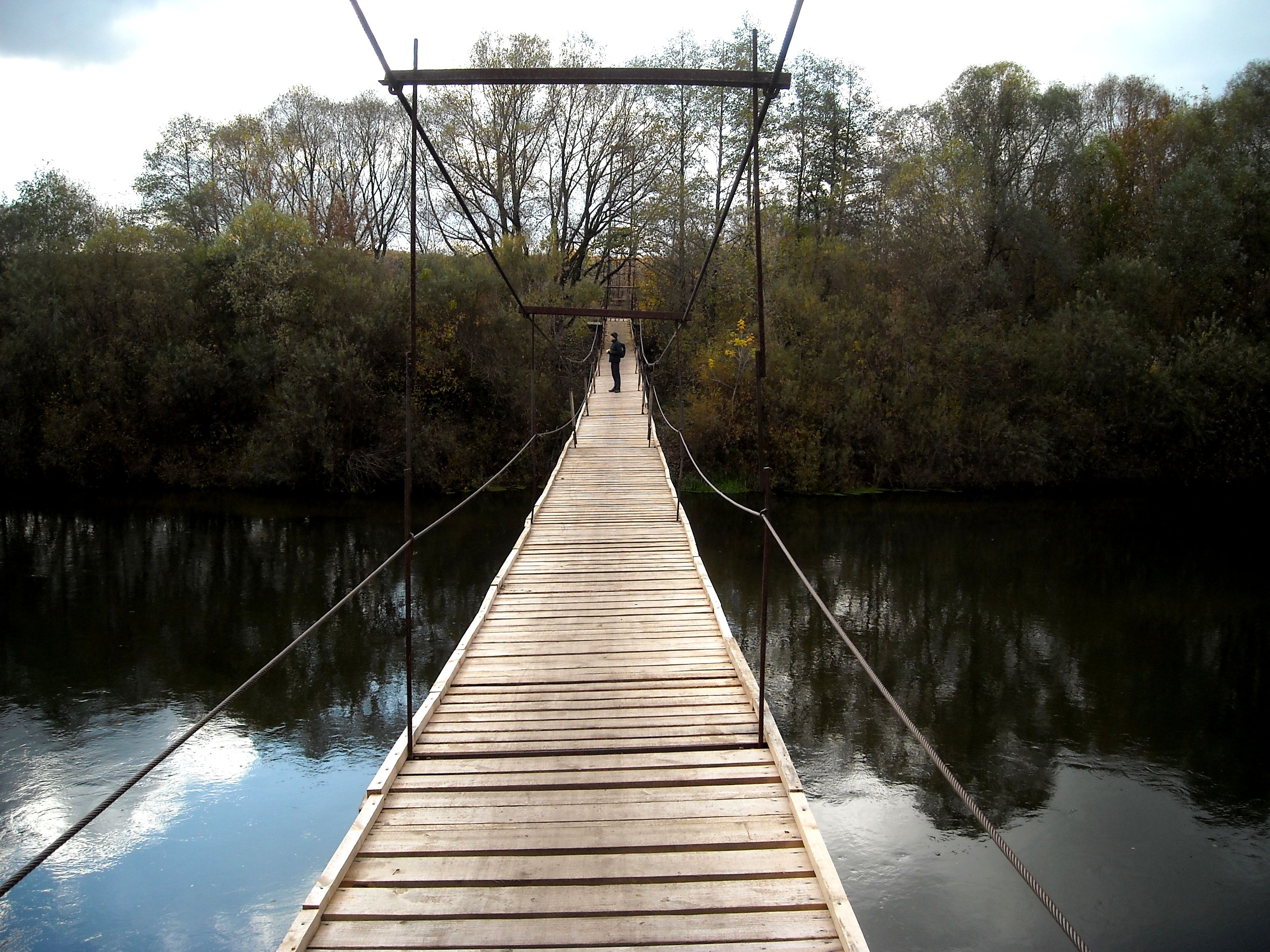
- Suspension bridge
- Interactive map of Dichnya
- Location of Dichnya Dichnya (Kursk Oblast)
- Coordinates: 51°39′33″N 35°43′41″E
- Country: Russia
- Federal subject: Kursk Oblast
- Administrative district: Kurchatovsky District
- SelsovietSelsoviet: Dichnyansky
- Elevation: 154 m (505 ft)

Population (2010 Census)
  - Total: 2,370
  - Estimate (2010): 2,370 (0%)

Administrative status
  - Capital of: Dichnyansky Selsoviet

Municipal status
  - Municipal district: Kurchatovsky Municipal District
  - Rural settlement: Dichnyansky Selsoviet Rural Settlement
  - Capital of: Dichnyansky Selsoviet Rural Settlement
- Time zone: UTC+3 (MSK)
- Postal code: 307236
- Dialing code: +7 47131
- OKTMO ID: 38621442101

Dichnya (Russian: Дичня) is a rural locality (a selo) and the administrative center of Dichnyansky Selsoviet Rural Settlement, Kurchatovsky District, Kursk Oblast, Russia. Population: 2,370 (2010 census); 2,250 (2002 census);

== Geography ==
The selo is located on the Dichnya River (a tributary of the Seym River), 33 km south-west of Kursk, 5 km east of the district center – the town Kurchatov. Dichnya is 154 m above sea level.

Climate

Dichnya has a warm-summer humid continental climate (Dfb in the Köppen climate classification).

Climate data for Dichnya
Month	Jan	Feb	Mar	Apr	May	Jun	Jul	Aug	Sep	Oct	Nov	Dec	Year
Mean daily maximum °C (°F)	−4.1 (24.6)	−3.1 (26.4)	2.8 (37.0)	13 (55)	19.4 (66.9)	22.6 (72.7)	25.2 (77.4)	24.5 (76.1)	18.2 (64.8)	10.5 (50.9)	3.4 (38.1)	−1.2 (29.8)	10.9 (51.6)
Daily mean °C (°F)	−6.1 (21.0)	−5.6 (21.9)	−0.8 (30.6)	8.2 (46.8)	14.7 (58.5)	18.3 (64.9)	20.9 (69.6)	20 (68)	14 (57)	7.3 (45.1)	1.2 (34.2)	−3.1 (26.4)	7.4 (45.3)
Mean daily minimum °C (°F)	−8.6 (16.5)	−8.7 (16.3)	−4.9 (23.2)	2.8 (37.0)	9.1 (48.4)	13 (55)	15.8 (60.4)	14.8 (58.6)	9.7 (49.5)	4 (39)	−1.2 (29.8)	−5.3 (22.5)	3.4 (38.0)
Average precipitation mm (inches)	52 (2.0)	45 (1.8)	48 (1.9)	51 (2.0)	63 (2.5)	72 (2.8)	75 (3.0)	56 (2.2)	59 (2.3)	59 (2.3)	48 (1.9)	49 (1.9)	677 (26.6)
Source: https://en.climate-data.org/asia/russian-federation/kursk-oblast/дичня-319649/

== Transport ==
Dichnya is located 23 km from the federal route M-2 Crimea Highway, on the road of regional importance 38K-017 (Kursk – Lgov – Rylsk – border with Ukraine), 8.5 km from the road 38K-010 (M2 – Ivanino), on the road of intermunicipal significance 38H-357 (38K-017 – Lukashevka), in the immediate vicinity of the railway halt 433 km (railway line Lgov I — Kursk).

The rural locality is situated 40 km from Kursk Vostochny Airport, 126 km from Belgorod International Airport and 242 km from Voronezh Peter the Great Airport.
