= Uspenka, Volgograd Oblast =

Uspenka Успенка
- Khutor
- Location within Volgograd Oblast Location within Russia
- Coordinates: 50°38′N 41°28′E
- Country: Russia
- Region: Volgograd Oblast
- District: Nekhayevsky District
- Time zone: UTC+4:00

Uspenka (Russian: Успенка) is a rural locality (a khutor) and the administrative center of Uspenskoye Rural Settlement, Nekhayevsky District, Volgograd Oblast, Russia. The population was 415 as of 2010. There are 12 streets.

== Geography ==
Uspenka is located on the Kalach Upland, on the Manina River, 43 km northwest of Nekhayevskaya (the district's administrative centre) by road. Dryaglovsky is the nearest rural locality.
