= Zolotukhino, Zolotukhinsky District, Kursk Oblast =

Zolotukhino Золотухино
- Urban-type settlement
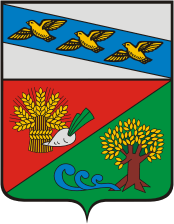
- Coat of arms
- Interactive map of Zolotukhino
- Location of Zolotukhino Zolotukhino (Kursk Oblast)
- Coordinates: 52.0845°N 36.3800°E
- Country: Russia
- Federal subject: Kursk Oblast
- Administrative district: Zolotukhinsky District

Population (2010 Census)
  - Total: 4,702
  - Estimate (2025): 4,216 (−10.3%)
- Time zone: UTC+3 (MSK)
- Postal code: 306020
- OKTMO ID: 38612151051

Zolotukhino (Russian: Золотухино) is an urban locality (an urban-type settlement) in Zolotukhinsky District of Kursk Oblast, Russia. Population: 4,487 (2021 census); 4,702 (2010 census); 4,999 (2002 census); 5,447 (1989 Soviet census).
