= Rogovo, Vladimir Oblast =

Rogovo Рогово
- Village
- Location within Vladimir Oblast Location within Russia
- Coordinates: 55°56′N 40°24′E
- Country: Russia
- Region: Vladimir Oblast
- District: Sudogodsky District
- Time zone: UTC+3:00

Rogovo (Russian: Рогово) is a rural locality (a village) in Golovinskoye Rural Settlement, Sudogodsky District, Vladimir Oblast, Russia. The population was 14 as of 2010.

== Geography ==
Rogovo is located on the Pol River, 33 km west of Sudogda (the district's administrative centre) by road. Golovino is the nearest rural locality.
