= Uspenka, Volokonovsky District, Belgorod Oblast =

Uspenka Успенка
- Selo
- Location within Belgorod Oblast Location within Russia
- Coordinates: 50°32′N 38°06′E
- Country: Russia
- Region: Belgorod Oblast
- District: Volokonovsky District
- Time zone: UTC+3:00

Uspenka (Russian: Успенка) is a rural locality (a selo) in Volokonovsky District, Belgorod Oblast, Russia. The population was 418 as of 2010. There are 3 streets.

== Geography ==
Uspenka is located 24 km northeast of Volokonovka (the district's administrative centre) by road. Krasnoye Gorodishche is the nearest rural locality.
