= Uspenka, Perm Krai =

Uspenka Успенка
- Village
- Location within Perm Krai Location within Russia
- Coordinates: 58°12′N 57°03′E
- Country: Russia
- Region: Perm Krai
- District: Chusovoy
- Time zone: UTC+5:00

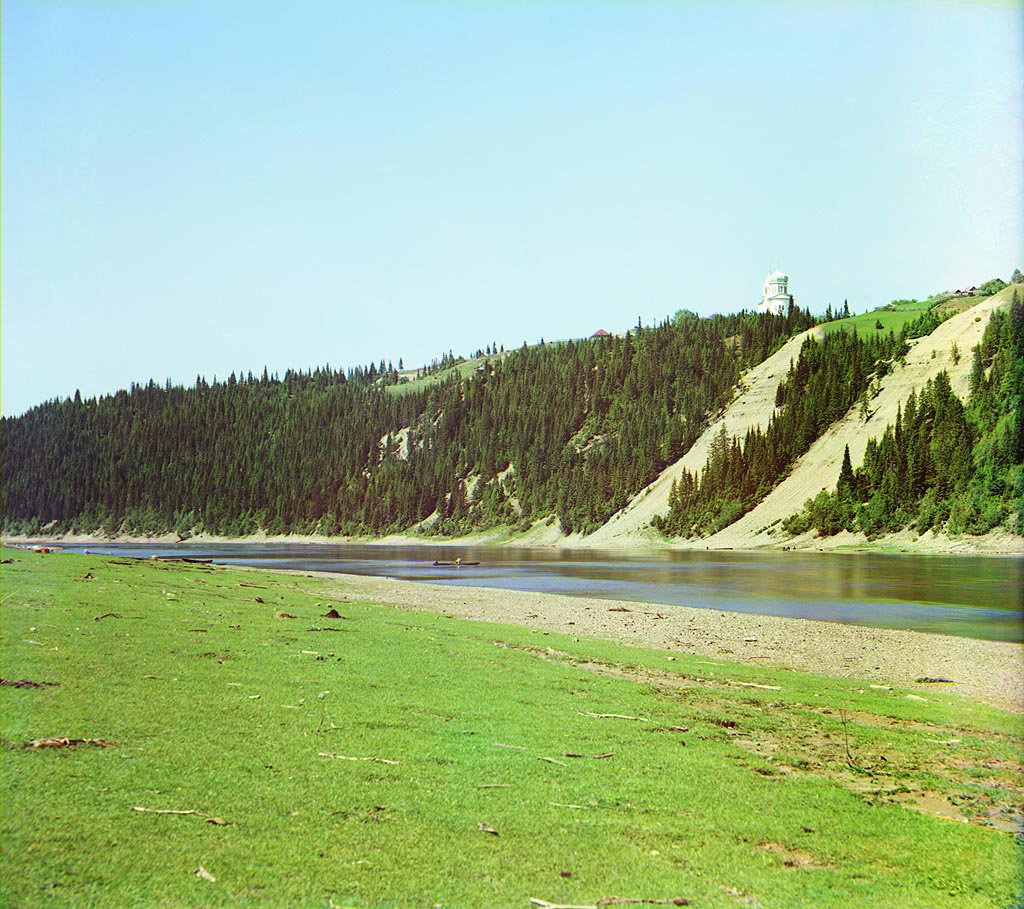
High bank of the Chusovaya River near Uspenka, photographed by Sergei Mikhailovich Prokudin-Gorsky in 1912

Uspenka (Russian: Успенка) is a rural locality (a village) in Chusovoy, Perm Krai, Russia. The population was 236 as of 2010. There are 9 streets.

== Geography ==
Uspenka is located 52 km west of Chusovoy. Vilizhnaya is the nearest rural locality.
