= Uspenka, Tabunsky District, Altai Krai =

Uspenka Успенка
- Selo
- Location within Altai Krai Location within Russia
- Coordinates: 52°55′N 79°20′E
- Country: Russia
- Region: Altai Krai
- District: Tabunsky District
- Time zone: UTC+7:00

Uspenka (Russian: Успенка) is a rural locality (a selo) in Serebropolsky Selsoviet, Tabunsky District, Altai Krai, Russia. The population was 205 as of 2013. There are 2 streets.

== Geography ==
Uspenka lies in the Kulunda Steppe 2.5 kilometers (1.6 mi) to the west of Lake Kulunda, 15 kilometers (9.3 mi) to the southeast of Maloye Yarovoye and 13 kilometers (8.1 mi) to the NNW of lake Zhigilda. It is located 42 kilometers (26 mi) northeast of Tabuny (the district's administrative centre) by road. Serebropol is the nearest rural locality.
