= Uspenka, Blagoveshchensky District, Republic of Bashkortostan =

Uspenka Успенка
- Village
- Location within Bashkortostan Location within Russia
- Coordinates: 54°59′N 56°13′E
- Country: Russia
- Region: Bashkortostan
- District: Blagoveshchensky District
- Time zone: UTC+5:00

Uspenka (Russian: Успенка) is a rural locality (a village) in Izyaksky Selsoviet, Blagoveshchensky District, Bashkortostan, Russia. The population was 139 as of 2010. There are 2 streets.

== Geography ==
Uspenka is located 26 km southeast of Blagoveshchensk (the district's administrative centre) by road. Verkhny Izyak is the nearest rural locality.
