= Uspenka, Astrakhan Oblast =

Uspenka Успенка
- Selo
- Location within Astrakhan Oblast Location within Russia
- Coordinates: 48°12′N 46°15′E
- Country: Russia
- Region: Astrakhan Oblast
- District: Akhtubinsky District
- Time zone: UTC+4:00

Uspenka (Russian: Успенка) is a rural locality (a selo) and the administrative center of Uspensky Selsoviet of Akhtubinsky District, Astrakhan Oblast, Russia. The population was 987 as of 2010. There are 28 streets.

== Geography ==
Uspenka is located 16 km southeast of Akhtubinsk (the district's administrative centre) by road. Akhtubinsk is the nearest rural locality.
