= Uspenka, Arkhangelsky District, Republic of Bashkortostan =

Uspenka Успенка
- Village
- Location within Bashkortostan Location within Russia
- Coordinates: 54°37′N 56°41′E
- Country: Russia
- Region: Bashkortostan
- District: Arkhangelsky District
- Time zone: UTC+5:00

Uspenka (Russian: Успенка) is a rural locality (a village) in Krasnokurtovsky Selsoviet, Arkhangelsky District, Bashkortostan, Russia. The population was 87 as of 2010. There are 3 streets.

== Geography ==
Uspenka is located 34 km north of Arkhangelskoye (the district's administrative centre) by road. Troitskoye is the nearest rural locality.
