= Uspenka, Loktevsky District, Altai Krai =

Uspenka Успенка
- Village
- Location within Altai Krai Location within Russia
- Coordinates: 50°58′N 81°32′E
- Country: Russia
- Region: Altai Krai
- District: Loktevsky District
- Time zone: UTC+7:00

Uspenka (Russian: Успенка) is a rural locality (a selo) and the administrative center of Uspensky Selsoviet of Loktevsky District, Altai Krai, Russia. The population was 1,002 in 2016. There are 12 streets.

== Geography ==
Uspenka is located 7 km southeast of Gornyak (the district's administrative centre) by road. Fabrichka is the nearest rural locality.
