= Avdeyeva, Kursk Oblast =

Rural locality in Kursk Oblast, Russia

Avdeyeva Авдеева
- Village
- Interactive map of Avdeyeva
- Location of Avdeyeva Avdeyeva (Kursk Oblast)
- Coordinates: 51°41′25″N 35°48′08″E
- Country: Russia
- Federal subject: Kursk Oblast
- Administrative district: Oktyabrsky District
- SelsovietSelsoviet: Dolzhenkovsky
- Elevation: 156 m (512 ft)

Population (2010 Census)
  - Total: 122
  - Estimate (2010): 122 (0%)

Municipal status
  - Municipal district: Oktyabrsky Municipal District
  - Rural settlement: Dolzhenkovsky Selsoviet Rural Settlement
- Time zone: UTC+3 (MSK)
- Postal code: 307211
- Dialing code: +7 47142
- OKTMO ID: 38628408106
- Website: bolshedol.rkursk.ru

Avdeyeva (Russian: Авдеева) is a rural locality (Russian: деревня, lit. 'village') in Dolzhenkovsky Selsoviet Rural Settlement, Oktyabrsky District, Kursk Oblast, Russia. Population: 122 (2010 census); 145 (2002 census);

== Geography ==
The village is located on the Rogozna River (a right tributary of the Seym River), 69 km from the Russia–Ukraine border, 23 km south-west of Kursk, 8 km north-west of the district center – the urban-type settlement Pryamitsyno, 2.5 km from the selsoviet center – Bolshoye Dolzhenkovo.

Climate

Avdeyeva has a warm-summer humid continental climate (Dfb in the Köppen climate classification).

== Transport ==
Avdeyeva is located 18 km from the federal route M-2 Crimea Highway (a part of the European route E105), 3.5 km from the road of regional importance 38K-017 (Kursk – Lgov – Rylsk – border with Ukraine), 4 km from the road of intermunicipal significance 38H-073 (Dyakonovo – Starkovo – Sokolovka), on the road 38H-074 (38N-073 – Bolshoye Dolzhenkovo via Avdeyeva), 6 km from the nearest railway halt 433 km (railway line Lgov I — Kursk).

The rural locality is situated 34 km from Kursk Vostochny Airport, 127 km from Belgorod International Airport and 237 km from Voronezh Peter the Great Airport.
