= Zolotukhinsky District =

Zolotukhinsky District Золотухинский район (Russian)
- District
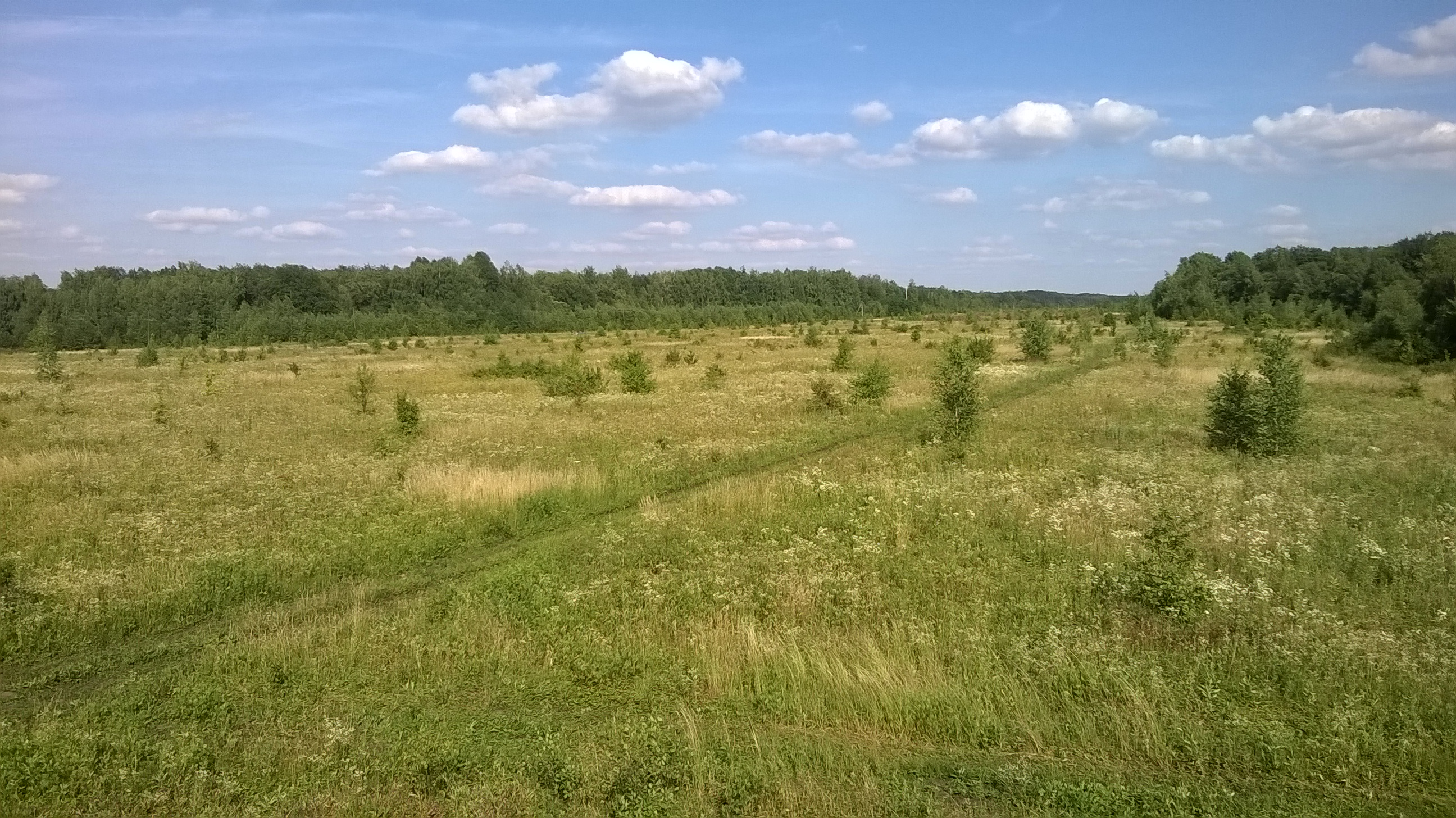
- Zhernovetskaya cottage, Zolotukhinsky District

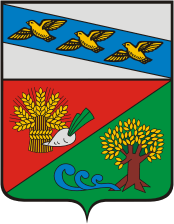
- Coat of arms
- Location of Zolotukhinsky District in Kursk Oblast
- Coordinates: 52°04′59″N 36°22′33″E
- Country: Russia
- Federal subject: Kursk Oblast
- Established: 1929
- Administrative center: Zolotukhino

Area
  - Total: 1,150 km^{2} (440 sq mi)

Population (2010 Census)
  - Total: 22,914
  - Density: 19.9/km^{2} (51.6/sq mi)
  - Urban: 20.5%
  - Rural: 79.5%

Administrative structure
  - Administrative divisions: 1 Work settlements, 19 Selsoviets
  - Inhabited localities: 1 urban-type settlements, 136 rural localities

Municipal structure
  - Municipally incorporated as: Zolotukhinsky Municipal District
  - Municipal divisions: 1 urban settlements, 9 rural settlements
- Time zone: UTC+3 (MSK)
- OKTMO ID: 38612000
- Website: http://zolotuhinsky.ru/

Zolotukhinsky District (Russian: Золоту́хинский райо́н) is an administrative and municipal district (raion), one of the twenty-eight in Kursk Oblast, Russia. It is located in the north of the oblast. The area of the district is 1,150 square kilometers (440 sq mi). Its administrative center is the urban locality (a work settlement) of Zolotukhino. Population: 21,151 (2021 census); 22,914 (2010 census); 26,800 (2002 Census); 31,564 (1989 Soviet census). The population of Zolotukhino accounts for 21.2% of the district's total population.

== Geography ==
Zolotukhinsky District is located in the north central region of Kursk Oblast, on the border with Oryol Oblast. The terrain is hilly plain; the district lies on the Orel-Kursk plateau of the Central Russian Upland. The main river in the district is the Tuskar River, a tributary of the Seym River and part of the Dnieper River Basin. The district is 20 km northeast of the city of Kursk, and 420 km southwest of Moscow. The area measures 44 km (north-south), and 40 km (west-east), with a total area of 1,150 km^{2} (3.7% of Kursk Oblast).

The district is bordered on the north by Ponyrovsky District and a portion of Oryol Oblast, on the east by Shchigrovsky District, on the south by Belovsky District, and on the west by Fatezhsky District.
