= Makarovka, Kurchatovsky District, Kursk Oblast =

Rural locality in Kursk Oblast, Russia

Makarovka Макаровка
- Selo
- Interactive map of Makarovka
- Location of Makarovka Makarovka (Kursk Oblast)
- Coordinates: 51°41′29″N 35°31′26″E
- Country: Russia
- Federal subject: Kursk Oblast
- Administrative district: Kurchatovsky District
- SelsovietSelsoviet: Makarovsky

Population (2010 Census)
  - Total: 615
  - Estimate (2010): 615 (0%)

Administrative status
  - Capital of: Makarovsky Selsoviet

Municipal status
  - Municipal district: Kurchatovsky Municipal District
  - Rural settlement: Makarovsky Selsoviet Rural Settlement
  - Capital of: Makarovsky Selsoviet Rural Settlement
- Time zone: UTC+3 (MSK)
- Postal code: 307226
- Dialing code: +7 47131
- OKTMO ID: 38621422101
- Website: макаровский-сельсовет.рф

Makarovka (Russian: Макаровка) is a rural locality (Russian: село, lit. 'village') and the administrative center of Makarovsky Selsoviet Rural Settlement, Kurchatovsky District, Kursk Oblast, Russia. Population: 615 (2010 census); 632 (2002 census);

== Geography ==
The village is located on the Seym River and its tributary, the Tereblya, 58 km from the Russia–Ukraine border, 44 km west of Kursk, 7 km north-west of the district center – the town Kurchatov.

Climate

Makarovka has a warm-summer humid continental climate (Dfb in the Köppen climate classification).

Climate data for Makarovka
Month	Jan	Feb	Mar	Apr	May	Jun	Jul	Aug	Sep	Oct	Nov	Dec	Year
Mean daily maximum °C (°F)	−4 (25)	−3 (27)	3 (37)	13.1 (55.6)	19.4 (66.9)	22.7 (72.9)	25.2 (77.4)	24.5 (76.1)	18.2 (64.8)	10.6 (51.1)	3.5 (38.3)	−1.1 (30.0)	11.0 (51.8)
Daily mean °C (°F)	−6 (21)	−5.5 (22.1)	−0.6 (30.9)	8.3 (46.9)	14.8 (58.6)	18.4 (65.1)	20.9 (69.6)	20 (68)	14 (57)	7.3 (45.1)	1.3 (34.3)	−3 (27)	7.5 (45.5)
Mean daily minimum °C (°F)	−8.4 (16.9)	−8.5 (16.7)	−4.7 (23.5)	2.9 (37.2)	9.2 (48.6)	13.1 (55.6)	15.9 (60.6)	14.9 (58.8)	9.8 (49.6)	4 (39)	−1 (30)	−5.2 (22.6)	3.5 (38.3)
Average precipitation mm (inches)	51 (2.0)	45 (1.8)	48 (1.9)	51 (2.0)	63 (2.5)	71 (2.8)	76 (3.0)	55 (2.2)	58 (2.3)	58 (2.3)	48 (1.9)	49 (1.9)	673 (26.6)
Source: https://en.climate-data.org/asia/russian-federation/kursk-oblast/макаровка-656073/

== Transport ==
Makarovka is located 37 km from the federal route M-2 Crimea Highway, 6 km from the road of regional importance 38K-017 (Kursk – Lgov – Rylsk – border with Ukraine), 2 km from the road of intermunicipal significance 38H-362 (38K-017 – Nikolayevka – Shirkovo), on the roads 38H-366 (38N-362 – Makarovka – Lgov) and 38H-752 (38N-366 – sanatoriums in the village of Makarovka), 6 km from the nearest railway station Lukashevka (railway line Lgov I — Kursk).

The rural locality is situated 53 km from Kursk Vostochny Airport, 137 km from Belgorod International Airport and 257 km from Voronezh Peter the Great Airport.
