= Bolshoye Dolzhenkovo =

Rural locality in Kursk Oblast, Russia

Bolshoye Dolzhenkovo Большое Долженково
- Selo
- Interactive map of Bolshoye Dolzhenkovo
- Location of Bolshoye Dolzhenkovo Bolshoye Dolzhenkovo (Kursk Oblast)
- Coordinates: 51°42′00″N 35°50′30″E
- Country: Russia
- Federal subject: Kursk Oblast
- Administrative district: Oktyabrsky District
- SelsovietSelsoviet: Dolzhenkovsky

Population (2010 Census)
  - Total: 477
  - Estimate (2010): 477 (0%)

Administrative status
  - Capital of: Dolzhenkovsky Selsoviet

Municipal status
  - Municipal district: Oktyabrsky Municipal District
  - Rural settlement: Dolzhenkovsky Selsoviet Rural Settlement
  - Capital of: Dolzhenkovsky Selsoviet Rural Settlement
- Time zone: UTC+3 (MSK)
- Postal code: 307210
- Dialing code: +7 47142
- OKTMO ID: 38628408101
- Website: bolshedol.rkursk.ru

Bolshoye Dolzhenkovo (Russian: Большое Долженково) is a rural locality (Russian: село, lit. 'village') and the administrative center of Dolzhenkovsky Selsoviet Rural Settlement, Oktyabrsky District, Kursk Oblast, Russia. Population: 477 (2010 census); 546 (2002 census);

== Geography ==
The village is located on the Rogozna River (a right tributary of the Seym River), 72 km from the Russia–Ukraine border, 20 km south-west of Kursk, 6 km north-west of the district center – the urban-type settlement Pryamitsyno.

Streets

There is Novaya Street and 272 houses.

Climate

Bolshoye Dolzhenkovo has a warm-summer humid continental climate (Dfb in the Köppen climate classification).

Climate data for Bolshoye Dolzhenkovo
Month	Jan	Feb	Mar	Apr	May	Jun	Jul	Aug	Sep	Oct	Nov	Dec	Year
Mean daily maximum °C (°F)	−4.1 (24.6)	−3.2 (26.2)	2.7 (36.9)	13 (55)	19.4 (66.9)	22.6 (72.7)	25.2 (77.4)	24.6 (76.3)	18.2 (64.8)	10.5 (50.9)	3.3 (37.9)	−1.2 (29.8)	10.9 (51.6)
Daily mean °C (°F)	−6.2 (20.8)	−5.7 (21.7)	−0.9 (30.4)	8.2 (46.8)	14.7 (58.5)	18.3 (64.9)	20.9 (69.6)	20 (68)	14 (57)	7.2 (45.0)	1.1 (34.0)	−3.2 (26.2)	7.4 (45.2)
Mean daily minimum °C (°F)	−8.7 (16.3)	−8.8 (16.2)	−4.9 (23.2)	2.7 (36.9)	9.1 (48.4)	13 (55)	15.8 (60.4)	14.9 (58.8)	9.7 (49.5)	3.9 (39.0)	−1.2 (29.8)	−5.4 (22.3)	3.3 (38.0)
Average precipitation mm (inches)	52 (2.0)	45 (1.8)	48 (1.9)	51 (2.0)	63 (2.5)	72 (2.8)	75 (3.0)	56 (2.2)	59 (2.3)	59 (2.3)	48 (1.9)	49 (1.9)	677 (26.6)
Source: https://en.climate-data.org/asia/russian-federation/kursk-oblast/bol-shoye-dolzhenkovo-658700/

== Transport ==
Bolshoye Dolzhenkovo is located 15 km from the federal route M-2 Crimea Highway (a part of the European route E105), 6 km from the road of regional importance 38K-017 (Kursk – Lgov – Rylsk – border with Ukraine), 0.3 km from the road of intermunicipal significance 38H-073 (Dyakonovo – Starkovo – Sokolovka), on the road 38H-074 (38N-073 – Bolshoye Dolzhenkovo via Avdeyeva), 7 km from the nearest railway halt 439 km (railway line Lgov I — Kursk).

The rural locality is situated 31 km from Kursk Vostochny Airport, 127 km from Belgorod International Airport and 234 km from Voronezh Peter the Great Airport.
