= Nizhneye Soskovo =

Rural locality in Kursk Oblast, Russia

Nizhneye Soskovo Нижнее Сосково
- Village
- Interactive map of Nizhneye Soskovo
- Location of Nizhneye Soskovo Nizhneye Soskovo (Kursk Oblast)
- Coordinates: 51°45′32″N 35°43′07″E
- Country: Russia
- Federal subject: Kursk Oblast
- Administrative district: Kurchatovsky District
- SelsovietSelsoviet: Kosteltsevsky

Population (2010 Census)
  - Total: 83
  - Estimate (2010): 83 (0%)

Municipal status
  - Municipal district: Kurchatovsky Municipal District
  - Rural settlement: Kosteltsevsky Selsoviet Rural Settlement
- Time zone: UTC+3 (MSK)
- Postal code: 307250
- Dialing code: +7 47131
- OKTMO ID: 38621425161
- Website: костельцевский-сельсовет.рф

Nizhneye Soskovo (Russian: Нижнее Сосково) is a rural locality (Russian: деревня, lit. 'village') in Kosteltsevsky Selsoviet Rural Settlement, Kurchatovsky District, Kursk Oblast, Russia. Population: 83 (2010 census); 125 (2002 census);

== Geography ==
The village is located on the Lomna River (a right tributary of the Seym), 71.5 km from the Russia–Ukraine border, 33 km west of Kursk, 12 km north-east of the district center – the town Kurchatov, 13 km from the selsoviet center – Kosteltsevo.

Climate

Nizhneye Soskovo has a warm-summer humid continental climate (Dfb in the Köppen climate classification).

Climate data for Nizhneye Soskovo
Month	Jan	Feb	Mar	Apr	May	Jun	Jul	Aug	Sep	Oct	Nov	Dec	Year
Mean daily maximum °C (°F)	−4.2 (24.4)	−3.2 (26.2)	2.6 (36.7)	12.8 (55.0)	19.1 (66.4)	22.4 (72.3)	25 (77)	24.4 (75.9)	18 (64)	10.4 (50.7)	3.3 (37.9)	−1.3 (29.7)	10.8 (51.4)
Daily mean °C (°F)	−6.2 (20.8)	−5.8 (21.6)	−1 (30)	8 (46)	14.5 (58.1)	18.1 (64.6)	20.7 (69.3)	19.8 (67.6)	13.8 (56.8)	7.1 (44.8)	1.1 (34.0)	−3.2 (26.2)	7.2 (45.0)
Mean daily minimum °C (°F)	−8.7 (16.3)	−8.8 (16.2)	−5.1 (22.8)	2.6 (36.7)	8.9 (48.0)	12.8 (55.0)	15.7 (60.3)	14.7 (58.5)	9.6 (49.3)	3.8 (38.8)	−1.2 (29.8)	−5.4 (22.3)	3.2 (37.8)
Average precipitation mm (inches)	52 (2.0)	45 (1.8)	48 (1.9)	51 (2.0)	63 (2.5)	72 (2.8)	75 (3.0)	56 (2.2)	59 (2.3)	59 (2.3)	48 (1.9)	49 (1.9)	677 (26.6)
Source: https://en.climate-data.org/asia/russian-federation/kursk-oblast/нижнее-сосково-672842/

== Transport ==
Nizhneye Soskovo is located 25 km from the federal route M-2 Crimea Highway, 10.5 km from the road of regional importance 38K-017 (Kursk – Lgov – Rylsk – border with Ukraine), on the roads of intermunicipal significance 38H-803 (Nizhneye Soskovo – Gardens near the village of Berezutskoye) and 38H-575 (Seym River – Mosolovo – Nizhneye Soskovo), 11.5 km from the nearest railway halt 433 km (railway line Lgov I — Kursk).

The rural locality is situated 39 km from Kursk Vostochny Airport, 137 km from Belgorod International Airport and 242 km from Voronezh Peter the Great Airport.
