= Mosolovo, Kursk Oblast =

Rural locality in Kursk Oblast, Russia

Mosolovo Мосолово
- Village
- Interactive map of Mosolovo
- Location of Mosolovo Mosolovo (Kursk Oblast)
- Coordinates: 51°41′42″N 35°40′46″E
- Country: Russia
- Federal subject: Kursk Oblast
- Administrative district: Kurchatovsky District
- SelsovietSelsoviet: Makarovsky

Population (2010 Census)
  - Total: 105
  - Estimate (2010): 105 (0%)

Municipal status
  - Municipal district: Kurchatovsky Municipal District
  - Rural settlement: Makarovsky Selsoviet Rural Settlement
- Time zone: UTC+3 (MSK)
- Postal code: 307237
- Dialing code: +7 47131
- OKTMO ID: 38621422146
- Website: макаровский-сельсовет.рф

Mosolovo (Russian: Мосолово) is a rural locality (Russian: деревня, lit. 'village') in Makarovsky Selsoviet Rural Settlement, Kurchatovsky District, Kursk Oblast, Russia. Population: 105 (2010 census); 167 (2002 census);

== Geography ==
The village is located on the Seym River, 64 km from the Russia–Ukraine border, 35.5 km south-west of Kursk, 4.5 km north of the district center – the town Kurchatov, 10.5 km from the selsoviet center – Makarovka.

Climate

Mosolovo has a warm-summer humid continental climate (Dfb in the Köppen climate classification).

Climate data for Mosolovo
Month	Jan	Feb	Mar	Apr	May	Jun	Jul	Aug	Sep	Oct	Nov	Dec	Year
Mean daily maximum °C (°F)	−4.1 (24.6)	−3.1 (26.4)	2.8 (37.0)	13 (55)	19.4 (66.9)	22.6 (72.7)	25.2 (77.4)	24.5 (76.1)	18.2 (64.8)	10.5 (50.9)	3.4 (38.1)	−1.2 (29.8)	10.9 (51.6)
Daily mean °C (°F)	−6.1 (21.0)	−5.6 (21.9)	−0.8 (30.6)	8.2 (46.8)	14.7 (58.5)	18.3 (64.9)	20.9 (69.6)	20 (68)	14 (57)	7.3 (45.1)	1.2 (34.2)	−3.1 (26.4)	7.4 (45.3)
Mean daily minimum °C (°F)	−8.6 (16.5)	−8.7 (16.3)	−4.9 (23.2)	2.8 (37.0)	9.1 (48.4)	13 (55)	15.8 (60.4)	14.8 (58.6)	9.7 (49.5)	4 (39)	−1.2 (29.8)	−5.3 (22.5)	3.4 (38.0)
Average precipitation mm (inches)	52 (2.0)	45 (1.8)	48 (1.9)	51 (2.0)	63 (2.5)	72 (2.8)	75 (3.0)	56 (2.2)	59 (2.3)	59 (2.3)	48 (1.9)	49 (1.9)	677 (26.6)
Source: https://en.climate-data.org/asia/russian-federation/kursk-oblast/мосолово-319646/

== Transport ==
Mosolovo is located 26 km from the federal route M-2 Crimea Highway, 4.5 km from the road of regional importance 38K-017 (Kursk – Lgov – Rylsk – border with Ukraine), on the road of intermunicipal significance 38H-575 (Seym River – Mosolovo – Nizhneye Soskovo), 4.5 km from the nearest railway halt Kurchatow (railway line Lgov I — Kursk).

The rural locality is situated 42.5 km from Kursk Vostochny Airport, 131 km from Belgorod International Airport and 245 km from Voronezh Peter the Great Airport.
