= Shirkovo, Kurchatovsky District, Kursk Oblast =

Rural locality in Kursk Oblast, Russia

Shirkovo Ширково
- Village
- Location of Shirkovo
- Location of Shirkovo Shirkovo (Kursk Oblast)
- Coordinates: 51°51′24″N 35°40′22″E
- Country: Russia
- Federal subject: Kursk Oblast
- Administrative district: Kurchatovsky District
- Selsoviet: Kosteltsevsky
- Elevation: 216 m (709 ft)

Population (2010 Census)
  - Total: 70

Municipal status
  - Municipal district: Kurchatovsky Municipal District
  - Rural settlement: Kosteltsevsky Selsoviet Rural Settlement
- Time zone: UTC+3 (MSK)
- Postal code(s): 307225
- Dialing code(s): +7 47131
- OKTMO ID: 38621425226
- Website: костельцевский-сельсовет.рф

Shirkovo (Russian: Ширково) is a rural locality (Russian: деревня, lit. 'village') in Kosteltsevsky Selsoviet Rural Settlement, Kurchatovsky District, Kursk Oblast, Russia. Population: 70 (2010 Census); 129 (2002 Census);

== Geography ==
The village is located on the Prutishche River in the basin of the Seym, 79 km (49 mi) from the Russia–Ukraine border, 39 km (24 mi) north-west of Kursk, 22.5 km (14.0 mi) north of the district center – the town Kurchatov, 8.5 km (5.3 mi) from the selsoviet center – Kosteltsevo.

Climate

Shirkovo has a warm-summer humid continental climate (Dfb in the Köppen climate classification).

Climate data for Shirkovo
Month	Jan	Feb	Mar	Apr	May	Jun	Jul	Aug	Sep	Oct	Nov	Dec	Year
Mean daily maximum °C (°F)	−4.3 (24.3)	−3.3 (26.1)	2.4 (36.3)	12.7 (54.9)	19 (66)	22.3 (72.1)	24.9 (76.8)	24.2 (75.6)	17.8 (64.0)	10.3 (50.5)	3.2 (37.8)	−1.3 (29.7)	10.7 (51.2)
Daily mean °C (°F)	−6.3 (20.7)	−5.8 (21.6)	−1 (30)	7.9 (46.2)	14.4 (57.9)	18 (64)	20.6 (69.1)	19.7 (67.5)	13.7 (56.7)	7 (45)	1 (34)	−3.2 (26.2)	7.2 (44.9)
Mean daily minimum °C (°F)	−8.7 (16.3)	−8.7 (16.3)	−5 (23)	2.6 (36.7)	8.9 (48.0)	12.8 (55.0)	15.6 (60.1)	14.6 (58.3)	9.6 (49.3)	3.8 (38.8)	−1.3 (29.7)	−5.4 (22.3)	3.2 (37.8)
Average precipitation mm (inches)	52 (2.0)	45 (1.8)	48 (1.9)	51 (2.0)	63 (2.5)	72 (2.8)	75 (3.0)	56 (2.2)	59 (2.3)	59 (2.3)	48 (1.9)	49 (1.9)	677 (26.6)
Source: https://en.climate-data.org/asia/russian-federation/kursk-oblast/shirkovo-656368/

== Transport ==
Shirkovo is located 23 km from the federal route M-2 Crimea Highway, 22 km from the road of regional importance 38K-017 (Kursk – Lgov – Rylsk – border with Ukraine), 20.5 km from the road 38K-023 (Lgov – Konyshyovka), on the road of intermunicipal significance 38H-362 (38K-017 – Nikolayevka – Shirkovo), 22 km from the nearest railway halt Kurchatow (railway line Lgov I — Kursk).

The rural locality is 44 km (27 mi) from Kursk Vostochny Airport, 148 km (92 mi) from Belgorod International Airport and 245 km (152 mi) from Voronezh Peter the Great Airport.
