= Kosteltsevo =

Rural locality in Kursk Oblast, Russia

Kosteltsevo Костельцево
- Selo
- Interactive map of Kosteltsevo
- Location of Kosteltsevo Kosteltsevo (Kursk Oblast)
- Coordinates: 51°49′24″N 35°33′32″E
- Country: Russia
- Federal subject: Kursk Oblast
- Administrative district: Kurchatovsky District
- SelsovietSelsoviet: Kosteltsevsky

Population (2010 Census)
  - Total: 177
  - Estimate (2010): 177 (0%)

Administrative status
  - Capital of: Kosteltsevsky Selsoviet

Municipal status
  - Municipal district: Kurchatovsky Municipal District
  - Rural settlement: Kosteltsevsky Selsoviet Rural Settlement
  - Capital of: Kosteltsevsky Selsoviet Rural Settlement
- Time zone: UTC+3 (MSK)
- Postal code: 307224
- Dialing code: +7 47131
- OKTMO ID: 38621425101
- Website: костельцевский-сельсовет.рф

Kosteltsevo (Russian: Костельцево) is a rural locality (Russian: село, lit. 'village') and the administrative center of Kosteltsevsky Selsoviet Rural Settlement, Kurchatovsky District, Kursk Oblast, Russia. Population: 177 (2010 census); 225 (2002 census);

== Geography ==
The village is located on the Prutishche River in the basin of the Seym, 73 km from the Russia–Ukraine border, 45 km north-west of Kursk, 19.5 km north-west of the district center – the town Kurchatov.

Climate

Kosteltsevo has a warm-summer humid continental climate (Dfb in the Köppen climate classification).

Climate data for Kosteltsevo
| Month | Jan | Feb | Mar | Apr | May | Jun | Jul | Aug | Sep | Oct | Nov | Dec | Year |
|---|---|---|---|---|---|---|---|---|---|---|---|---|---|
| Mean daily maximum °C (°F) | −4.1 (24.6) | −3.2 (26.2) | 2.6 (36.7) | 12.9 (55.2) | 19.1 (66.4) | 22.4 (72.3) | 25 (77) | 24.3 (75.7) | 18 (64) | 10.4 (50.7) | 3.3 (37.9) | −1.2 (29.8) | 10.8 (51.4) |
| Daily mean °C (°F) | −6.2 (20.8) | −5.7 (21.7) | −0.9 (30.4) | 8.1 (46.6) | 14.5 (58.1) | 18.1 (64.6) | 20.7 (69.3) | 19.8 (67.6) | 13.8 (56.8) | 7.2 (45.0) | 1.1 (34.0) | −3.1 (26.4) | 7.3 (45.1) |
| Mean daily minimum °C (°F) | −8.6 (16.5) | −8.7 (16.3) | −5 (23) | 2.6 (36.7) | 8.9 (48.0) | 12.8 (55.0) | 15.7 (60.3) | 14.7 (58.5) | 9.6 (49.3) | 3.9 (39.0) | −1.2 (29.8) | −5.3 (22.5) | 3.3 (37.9) |
| Average precipitation mm (inches) | 51 (2.0) | 45 (1.8) | 48 (1.9) | 51 (2.0) | 63 (2.5) | 71 (2.8) | 76 (3.0) | 55 (2.2) | 58 (2.3) | 58 (2.3) | 48 (1.9) | 49 (1.9) | 673 (26.6) |
Source: https://en.climate-data.org/азия/россииская-федерация/курская-область/костельцево-662738/

== Transport ==
Kosteltsevo is located 32 km from the federal route M-2 Crimea Highway, 21.5 km from the road of regional importance 38K-017 (Kursk – Lgov – Rylsk – border with Ukraine), 17 km from the road 38K-023 (Lgov – Konyshyovka), 2 km from the road of intermunicipal significance 38H-362 (38K-017 – Nikolayevka – Shirkovo), on the roads 38H-365 (38N-362 – Kosteltsevo – Zaprutye) and 38H-173 (Kosteltsevo – Mukhino), 18 km from the nearest railway halt 565 km (railway line Navlya – Lgov-Kiyevsky).

The rural locality is situated 51 km from Kursk Vostochny Airport, 149 km from Belgorod International Airport and 254 km from Voronezh Peter the Great Airport.
