= Kurchatov, Russia =

Town in Kursk Oblast, Russia

Kurchatov Курчатов
- Town
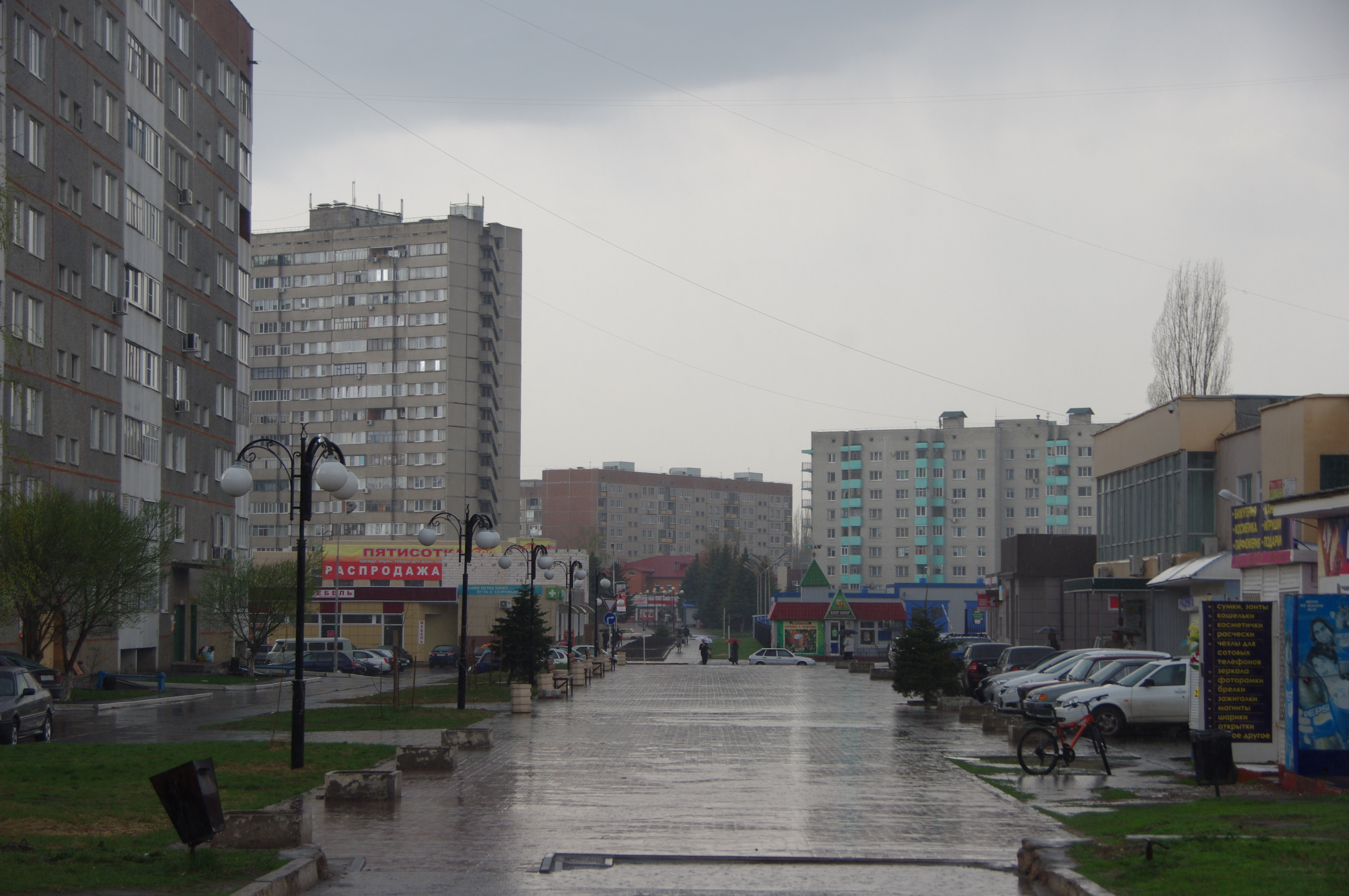
- Kurchatov

- Flag Coat of arms
- Interactive map of Kurchatov
- Location of Kurchatov Kurchatov (Russia)
- Coordinates: 51°40′N 35°39′E
- Country: Russia
- Federal subject: Kursk Oblast
- Founded: 1968
- Town status since: 1983
- Elevation: 160 m (520 ft)

Population (2010 Census)
  - Total: 42,706
  - Estimate (2025): 38,543 (−9.7%)

Administrative status
  - Subordinated to: town of oblast significance of Kurchatov
  - Capital of: Kurchatovsky District, town of oblast significance of Kurchatov

Municipal status
  - Urban okrug: Kurchatov Urban Okrug
  - Capital of: Kurchatov Urban Okrug, Kurchatovsky Municipal District
- Time zone: UTC+3 (MSK)
- Postal code: 307250
- OKTMO ID: 38708000001
- Website: www.kurchatov.info

Kurchatov (Russian: Курча́тов) is a town in Kursk Oblast, Russia, located on the Seym River 42 kilometers (26 mi) west of Kursk. Population: 40,318 (2021 census); 42,706 (2010 census); 45,556 (2002 census); 41,085 (1989 Soviet census).

== History ==
Kurchatov was founded in 1968 due to the construction of the Kursk Nuclear Power Plant and granted town status in 1983. It was named after Soviet physicist Igor Kurchatov.

The town of Kurchatov, along with the neighbouring Kursk Nuclear Power Plant, stood in for the town of Pripyat and the Chernobyl Nuclear Power Plant in the 1991 American television movie, Chernobyl: The Final Warning. Kurchatov and the Kursk nuclear power plant would play as Pripyat and the Chernobyl nuclear power plant once again in the 2021 Russian film Chernobyl: Abyss.

In what is now Kurchatov in 1943 fighting as part of the Battle of Kursk took place on two separate occasions that summer. The battle of Kursk was one of the pivotal battles of the Eastern Front and was one of the largest tank battles in the history of warfare.

== Administrative and municipal status ==
Within the framework of administrative divisions, Kurchatov serves as the administrative center of Kurchatovsky District, even though it is not a part of it. As an administrative division, it is incorporated separately as the town of oblast significance of Kurchatov—an administrative unit with the status equal to that of the districts. As a municipal division, the town of oblast significance of Kurchatov is incorporated as Kurchatov Urban Okrug.
