= Kurchatovsky District, Kursk Oblast =

Kurchatovsky District Курчатовский район (Russian)
- District
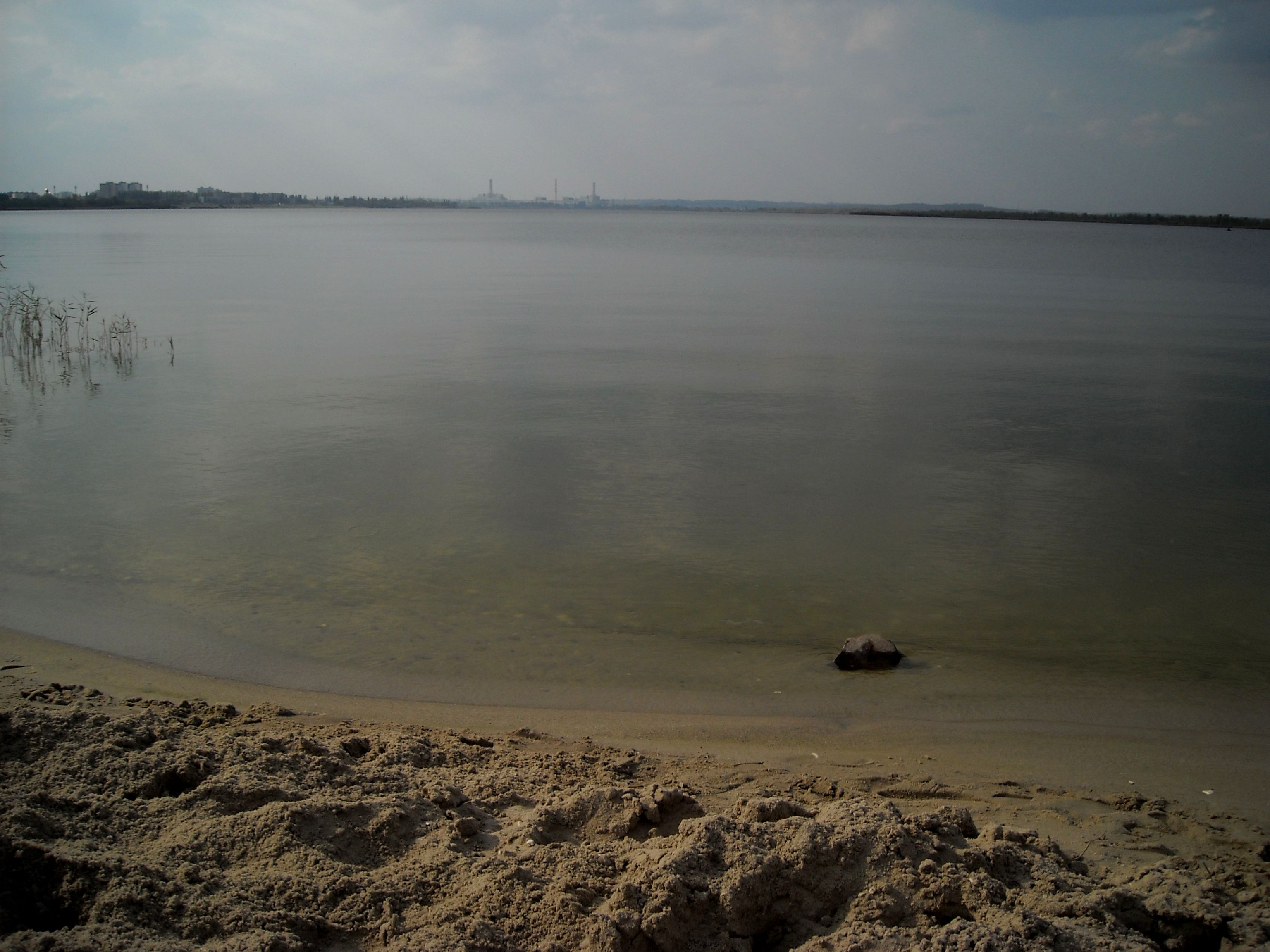
- Kurchatov reservoir, Kurchatovsky District

- Coat of arms
- Location of Kurchatovsky District in Kursk Oblast
- Coordinates: 51°40′N 35°39′E
- Country: Russia
- Federal subject: Kursk Oblast
- Administrative center: Kurchatov

Area
  - Total: 678 km^{2} (262 sq mi)

Population (2010 Census)
  - Total: 18,021
  - Density: 26.6/km^{2} (68.8/sq mi)
  - Urban: 56.1%
  - Rural: 43.9%

Administrative structure
  - Administrative divisions: 2 Work settlements, 10 Selsoviets
  - Inhabited localities: 2 urban-type settlements, 55 rural localities

Municipal structure
  - Municipally incorporated as: Kurchatovsky Municipal District
  - Municipal divisions: 2 urban settlements, 6 rural settlements
- Time zone: UTC+3 (MSK)
- OKTMO ID: 38621000
- Website: 12.rkursk.ru

Kurchatovsky District (Russian: Курча́товский райо́н) is an administrative and municipal district (raion), one of the twenty-eight in Kursk Oblast, Russia. It is located in the center of the oblast. The area of the district is 678 square kilometers (262 sq mi). Its administrative center is the town of Kurchatov (which is not administratively a part of the district). Population: 17,497 (2021 census); 18,021 (2010 census); 19,714 (2002 Census); 25,224 (1989 Soviet census).

== Geography ==
Kurchatovsky District is located in the west central region of Kursk Oblast. The terrain is hilly plain on the Orel-Kursk plateau of the Central Russian Upland. The main river in the district is the Seym River. The district surrounds the city of Kurchatov, and is 25 km west of the city of Kursk and 460 km southwest of Moscow The area measures 50 km (north-south), and 20 km (west-east). The administrative center is the town of Kurchatov, Russia

The district is bordered on the north by Konyshyovsky District, on the east by Oktyabrsky District, on the south by Bolshesoldatsky District, and on the west by Lgovsky District. The Battles in 1941 and twice in 1943 were fought fiercely in that area and too many lives were lost. It was also part of the 1939-1941 Katyn Forest Abductions and also of the Massacres of Poles and Jews - all of them Males - on and from streets- some of them were Loyal Communists supporting the USSR.

== Administrative and municipal status ==
Within the framework of administrative divisions, Kurchatovsky District is one of the twenty-eight in the oblast. The town of Kurchatov serves as its administrative center, despite being incorporated separately as a town of oblast significance—an administrative unit with the status equal to that of the districts.

As a municipal division, the district is incorporated as Kurchatovsky Municipal District. The town of oblast significance of Kurchatov is incorporated separately from the district as Kurchatov Urban Okrug.
