= Pokrovsky, Russia =

Pokrovsky (Russian: Покро́вский; masculine), Pokrovskaya (Покро́вская; feminine), or Pokrovskoye (Покро́вское; neuter) is the name of several inhabited localities in Russia.

== Arkhangelsk Oblast ==
As of 2010, three rural localities in Arkhangelsk Oblast bear this name:

- Pokrovskoye, Arkhangelsk Oblast, a settlement in Tamitsky Selsoviet of Onezhsky District
- Pokrovskaya, Shenkursky District, Arkhangelsk Oblast, a village in Fedorogorsky Selsoviet of Shenkursky District
- Pokrovskaya, Velsky District, Arkhangelsk Oblast, a village in Argunovsky Selsoviet of Velsky District

== Republic of Bashkortostan ==
As of 2010, one rural locality in the Republic of Bashkortostan bears this name:

- Pokrovskoye, Republic of Bashkortostan, a village in Ilyino-Polyansky Selsoviet of Blagoveshchensky District

== Belgorod Oblast ==
As of 2010, one rural locality in Belgorod Oblast bears this name:

- Pokrovsky, Belgorod Oblast, a khutor in Ivnyansky District

== Bryansk Oblast ==
As of 2010, two rural localities in Bryansk Oblast bear this name:

- Pokrovsky, Sevsky District, Bryansk Oblast, a settlement in Knyagininsky Selsoviet of Sevsky District
- Pokrovsky, Trubchevsky District, Bryansk Oblast, a settlement in Uzhansky Selsoviet of Trubchevsky District

== Chuvash Republic ==
As of 2010, two rural localities in the Chuvash Republic bear this name:

- Pokrovskoye, Mariinsko-Posadsky District, Chuvash Republic, a selo in Karabashskoye Rural Settlement of Mariinsko-Posadsky District
- Pokrovskoye, Shumerlinsky District, Chuvash Republic, a settlement in Magarinskoye Rural Settlement of Shumerlinsky District

== Republic of Dagestan ==
As of 2010, one rural locality in the Republic of Dagestan bears this name:

- Pokrovskoye, Republic of Dagestan, a selo in Pokrovsky Selsoviet of Khasavyurtovsky District

== Ivanovo Oblast ==
As of 2010, one rural locality in Ivanovo Oblast bears this name:

- Pokrovskoye, Ivanovo Oblast, a village in Savinsky District

== Kaliningrad Oblast ==
As of 2010, three rural localities in Kaliningrad Oblast bear this name:

- Pokrovskoye, Yantarny, Kaliningrad Oblast, a settlement under the administrative jurisdiction of the urban-type settlement of oblast significance of Yantarny
- Pokrovskoye, Chernyakhovsky District, Kaliningrad Oblast, a settlement in Kaluzhsky Rural Okrug of Chernyakhovsky District
- Pokrovskoye, Gusevsky District, Kaliningrad Oblast, a settlement in Mikhaylovsky Rural Okrug of Gusevsky District

== Kaluga Oblast ==
As of 2010, three rural localities in Kaluga Oblast bear this name:

- Pokrovskoye, Ferzikovsky District, Kaluga Oblast, a selo in Ferzikovsky District
- Pokrovskoye, Mosalsky District, Kaluga Oblast, a village in Mosalsky District
- Pokrovskoye, Peremyshlsky District, Kaluga Oblast, a village in Peremyshlsky District

== Republic of Karelia ==
As of 2010, one rural locality in the Republic of Karelia bears this name:

- Pokrovskoye, Republic of Karelia, a village in Medvezhyegorsky District

== Kirov Oblast ==
As of 2010, three rural localities in Kirov Oblast bear this name:

- Pokrovsky, Kirov Oblast, a pochinok in Buysky Rural Okrug of Urzhumsky District
- Pokrovskoye, Kilmezsky District, Kirov Oblast, a village in Zimnyaksky Rural Okrug of Kilmezsky District
- Pokrovskoye, Kotelnichsky District, Kirov Oblast, a selo in Pokrovsky Rural Okrug of Kotelnichsky District

== Kostroma Oblast ==
As of 2010, three rural localities in Kostroma Oblast bear this name:

- Pokrovskoye, Chukhlomsky District, Kostroma Oblast, a village in Nozhkinskoye Settlement of Chukhlomsky District
- Pokrovskoye, Galichsky District, Kostroma Oblast, a selo in Orekhovskoye Settlement of Galichsky District
- Pokrovskoye, Ostrovsky District, Kostroma Oblast, a selo in Adishchevskoye Settlement of Ostrovsky District

== Krasnodar Krai ==
As of 2010, two rural localities in Krasnodar Krai bear this name:

- Pokrovsky, Abinsky District, Krasnodar Krai, a khutor in Fedorovsky Rural Okrug of Abinsky District
- Pokrovsky, Otradnensky District, Krasnodar Krai, a khutor in Otradnensky Rural Okrug of Otradnensky District

== Kursk Oblast ==
As of 2010, six rural localities in Kursk Oblast bear this name:

- Pokrovsky, Medvensky District, Kursk Oblast, a khutor in Vyshnereutchansky Selsoviet of Medvensky District
- Pokrovsky, Oktyabrsky District, Kursk Oblast, a khutor in Starkovsky Selsoviet of Oktyabrsky District
- Pokrovsky, Sudzhansky District, Kursk Oblast, a khutor in Novoivanovsky Selsoviet of Sudzhansky District
- Pokrovskoye, Manturovsky District, Kursk Oblast, a selo in Kruto-Verkhovsky Selsoviet of Manturovsky District
- Pokrovskoye, Oktyabrsky District, Kursk Oblast, a selo in Artyukhovsky Selsoviet of Oktyabrsky District
- Pokrovskoye, Rylsky District, Kursk Oblast, a village in Gorelukhovsky Selsoviet of Rylsky District

== Leningrad Oblast ==
As of 2010, two rural localities in Leningrad Oblast bear this name:

- Pokrovskoye, Leningrad Oblast, a village in Oredezhskoye Settlement Municipal Formation of Luzhsky District
- Pokrovskaya, Leningrad Oblast, a village in Pudomyagskoye Settlement Municipal Formation of Gatchinsky District

== Lipetsk Oblast ==
As of 2010, three rural localities in Lipetsk Oblast bear this name:

- Pokrovskoye, Dankovsky District, Lipetsk Oblast, a selo in Malinkovsky Selsoviet of Dankovsky District
- Pokrovskoye, Stanovlyansky District, Lipetsk Oblast, a selo in Georgiyevsky Selsoviet of Stanovlyansky District
- Pokrovskoye, Terbunsky District, Lipetsk Oblast, a selo in Pokrovsky Selsoviet of Terbunsky District

== Mari El Republic ==
As of 2010, three rural localities in the Mari El Republic bear this name:

- Pokrovsky, Mari El Republic, a pochinok in Korkatovsky Rural Okrug of Morkinsky District
- Pokrovskoye, Gornomariysky District, Mari El Republic, a selo in Troitskoposadsky Rural Okrug of Gornomariysky District
- Pokrovskoye, Yurinsky District, Mari El Republic, a selo in Vasilyevsky Rural Okrug of Yurinsky District

== Republic of Mordovia ==
As of 2010, one rural locality in the Republic of Mordovia bears this name:

- Pokrovskoye, Republic of Mordovia, a selo in Pokrovsky Selsoviet of Atyashevsky District

== Moscow Oblast ==
As of 2010, ten rural localities in Moscow Oblast bear this name:

- Pokrovskoye, Dmitrovsky District, Moscow Oblast, a selo in Bolsherogachevskoye Rural Settlement of Dmitrovsky District
- Pokrovskoye, Istrinsky District, Moscow Oblast, a village in Obushkovskoye Rural Settlement of Istrinsky District
- Pokrovskoye (selo), Chastsovskoye Rural Settlement, Odintsovsky District, Moscow Oblast, a selo in Chastsovskoye Rural Settlement of Odintsovsky District
- Pokrovskoye (settlement), Chastsovskoye Rural Settlement, Odintsovsky District, Moscow Oblast, a settlement in Chastsovskoye Rural Settlement of Odintsovsky District
- Pokrovskoye, Yershovskoye Rural Settlement, Odintsovsky District, Moscow Oblast, a village in Yershovskoye Rural Settlement of Odintsovsky District
- Pokrovskoye, Podolsky District, Moscow Oblast, a selo in Voronovskoye Rural Settlement of Podolsky District
- Pokrovskoye, Ruzsky District, Moscow Oblast, a selo in Volkovskoye Rural Settlement of Ruzsky District
- Pokrovskoye, Stupinsky District, Moscow Oblast, a selo in Aksinyinskoye Rural Settlement of Stupinsky District
- Pokrovskoye, Chismenskoye Rural Settlement, Volokolamsky District, Moscow Oblast, a selo in Chismenskoye Rural Settlement of Volokolamsky District
- Pokrovskoye, Teryayevskoye Rural Settlement, Volokolamsky District, Moscow Oblast, a selo in Teryayevskoye Rural Settlement of Volokolamsky District

== Nizhny Novgorod Oblast ==
As of 2010, two rural localities in Nizhny Novgorod Oblast bear this name:

- Pokrovskoye, Semyonov, Nizhny Novgorod Oblast, a village in Shaldezhsky Selsoviet of the town of oblast significance of Semyonov
- Pokrovskoye, Gorodetsky District, Nizhny Novgorod Oblast, a village in Zinyakovsky Selsoviet of Gorodetsky District

== Novgorod Oblast ==
As of 2010, four rural localities in Novgorod Oblast bear this name:

- Pokrovskoye, Borovichsky District, Novgorod Oblast, a village in Konchansko-Suvorovskoye Settlement of Borovichsky District
- Pokrovskoye, Chudovsky District, Novgorod Oblast, a village in Gruzinskoye Settlement of Chudovsky District
- Pokrovskoye, Lyubytinsky District, Novgorod Oblast, a village under the administrative jurisdiction of the urban-type settlement of Lyubytino in Lyubytinsky District
- Pokrovskoye, Moshenskoy District, Novgorod Oblast, a village in Orekhovskoye Settlement of Moshenskoy District

== Novosibirsk Oblast ==
As of 2010, one rural locality in Novosibirsk Oblast bears this name:

- Pokrovskoye, Novosibirsk Oblast, a settlement in Chulymsky District

== Oryol Oblast ==
As of 2010, nine inhabited localities in Oryol Oblast bear this name.

Urban localities

- Pokrovskoye, Pokrovsky District, Oryol Oblast, an urban-type settlement in Pokrovsky District

Rural localities

- Pokrovsky, Trosnyansky District, Oryol Oblast, a settlement in Pennovsky Selsoviet of Trosnyansky District
- Pokrovsky, Znamensky District, Oryol Oblast, a settlement in Glotovsky Selsoviet of Znamensky District
- Pokrovskoye, Bolkhovsky District, Oryol Oblast, a selo in Odnolutsky Selsoviet of Bolkhovsky District
- Pokrovskoye, Krasnozorensky District, Oryol Oblast, a selo in Pokrovsky Selsoviet of Krasnozorensky District
- Pokrovskoye, Maloarkhangelsky District, Oryol Oblast, a village in Dubovitsky Selsoviet of Maloarkhangelsky District
- Pokrovskoye, Trosnyansky District, Oryol Oblast, a village in Trosnyansky Selsoviet of Trosnyansky District
- Pokrovskoye, Znamensky District, Oryol Oblast, a selo in Koptevsky Selsoviet of Znamensky District
- Pokrovskaya, Oryol Oblast, a village in Galichinsky Selsoviet of Verkhovsky District

== Perm Krai ==
As of 2010, two rural localities in Perm Krai bear this name:

- Pokrovskoye, Perm Krai, a selo in Nytvensky District
- Pokrovskaya, Perm Krai, a village in Ilyinsky District

== Pskov Oblast ==
As of 2010, three rural localities in Pskov Oblast bear this name:

- Pokrovskoye, Dedovichsky District, Pskov Oblast, a village in Dedovichsky District
- Pokrovskoye, Krasnogorodsky District, Pskov Oblast, a village in Krasnogorodsky District
- Pokrovskoye, Opochetsky District, Pskov Oblast, a village in Opochetsky District

== Rostov Oblast ==
As of 2010, two rural localities in Rostov Oblast bear this name:

- Pokrovsky, Rostov Oblast, a khutor in Gagarinskoye Rural Settlement of Morozovsky District
- Pokrovskoye, Rostov Oblast, a selo in Pokrovskoye Rural Settlement of Neklinovsky District

== Ryazan Oblast ==
As of 2010, two rural localities in Ryazan Oblast bear this name:

- Pokrovsky, Ryazan Oblast, a settlement in Uspensky Rural Okrug of Skopinsky District
- Pokrovskoye, Ryazan Oblast, a selo in Pokrovsky Rural Okrug of Ukholovsky District

== Smolensk Oblast ==
As of 2010, three rural localities in Smolensk Oblast bear this name:

- Pokrovskoye, Demidovsky District, Smolensk Oblast, a village in Vorobyevskoye Rural Settlement of Demidovsky District
- Pokrovskoye, Safonovsky District, Smolensk Oblast, a village in Beleninskoye Rural Settlement of Safonovsky District
- Pokrovskoye, Sychyovsky District, Smolensk Oblast, a village in Karavayevskoye Rural Settlement of Sychyovsky District

== Stavropol Krai ==
As of 2010, one rural locality in Stavropol Krai bears this name:

- Pokrovskoye, Stavropol Krai, a selo in Krasnogvardeysky District

== Sverdlovsk Oblast ==
As of 2010, three rural localities in Sverdlovsk Oblast bear this name:

- Pokrovskoye, Artyomovsky District, Sverdlovsk Oblast, a selo in Artyomovsky District
- Pokrovskoye, Kamensky District, Sverdlovsk Oblast, a selo in Kamensky District
- Pokrovskoye, Prigorodny District, Sverdlovsk Oblast, a selo in Prigorodny District

== Tambov Oblast ==
As of 2010, one rural locality in Tambov Oblast bears this name:

- Pokrovskoye, Tambov Oblast, a selo in Petrovsky Selsoviet of Petrovsky District

== Republic of Tatarstan ==
As of 2010, four rural localities in the Republic of Tatarstan bear this name:

- Pokrovsky, Bavlinsky District, Republic of Tatarstan, a settlement in Bavlinsky District
- Pokrovsky, Nurlatsky District, Republic of Tatarstan, a settlement in Nurlatsky District
- Pokrovskoye, Mamadyshsky District, Republic of Tatarstan, a selo in Mamadyshsky District
- Pokrovskoye, Yelabuzhsky District, Republic of Tatarstan, a selo in Yelabuzhsky District

== Tula Oblast ==
As of 2010, five rural localities in Tula Oblast bear this name:

- Pokrovskoye, Chernsky District, Tula Oblast, a village in Krestovskaya Rural Administration of Chernsky District
- Pokrovskoye, Kimovsky District, Tula Oblast, a selo in Pokrovsky Rural Okrug of Kimovsky District
- Pokrovskoye, Suvorovsky District, Tula Oblast, a village in Balevskaya Rural Territory of Suvorovsky District
- Pokrovskoye, Volovsky District, Tula Oblast, a selo in Baskakovsky Rural Okrug of Volovsky District
- Pokrovskoye, Zaoksky District, Tula Oblast, a selo in Malakhovsky Rural Okrug of Zaoksky District

== Tver Oblast ==
As of 2010, fourteen rural localities in Tver Oblast bear this name:

- Pokrovskoye, Firovsky District, Tver Oblast, a selo in Firovsky District
- Pokrovskoye, Kalininsky District, Tver Oblast, a selo in Kalininsky District
- Pokrovskoye (Farafonovskoye Rural Settlement), Kashinsky District, Tver Oblast, a village in Kashinsky District; municipally, a part of Farafonovskoye Rural Settlement of that district
- Pokrovskoye (Davydovskoye Rural Settlement), Kashinsky District, Tver Oblast, a village in Kashinsky District; municipally, a part of Davydovskoye Rural Settlement of that district
- Pokrovskoye, Kimrsky District, Tver Oblast, a village in Kimrsky District
- Pokrovskoye, Krasnokholmsky District, Tver Oblast, a village in Krasnokholmsky District
- Pokrovskoye (Sorozhskoye Rural Settlement), Ostashkovsky District, Tver Oblast, a village in Ostashkovsky District; municipally, a part of Sorozhskoye Rural Settlement of that district
- Pokrovskoye (Zamoshskoye Rural Settlement), Ostashkovsky District, Tver Oblast, a village in Ostashkovsky District; municipally, a part of Zamoshskoye Rural Settlement of that district
- Pokrovskoye, Rzhevsky District, Tver Oblast, a village in Rzhevsky District
- Pokrovskoye (Staritskoye Rural Settlement), Staritsky District, Tver Oblast, a village in Staritsky District; municipally, a part of Staritskoye Rural Settlement of that district
- Pokrovskoye (Novo-Yamskoye Rural Settlement), Staritsky District, Tver Oblast, a village in Staritsky District; municipally, a part of Novo-Yamskoye Rural Settlement of that district
- Pokrovskoye (Ponizovskoye Rural Settlement), Toropetsky District, Tver Oblast, a village in Toropetsky District; municipally, a part of Ponizovskoye Rural Settlement of that district
- Pokrovskoye (Skvortsovskoye Rural Settlement), Toropetsky District, Tver Oblast, a village in Toropetsky District; municipally, a part of Skvortsovskoye Rural Settlement of that district
- Pokrovskoye, Udomelsky District, Tver Oblast, a village in Udomelsky District

== Tyumen Oblast ==
As of 2010, one rural locality in Tyumen Oblast bears this name:

- Pokrovskoye, Tyumen Oblast, a selo in Pokrovsky Rural Okrug of Yarkovsky District

== Ulyanovsk Oblast ==
As of 2010, one rural locality in Ulyanovsk Oblast bears this name:

- Pokrovskoye, Ulyanovsk Oblast, a selo in Mokrobugurninsky Rural Okrug of Tsilninsky District

== Vologda Oblast ==
As of 2010, twelve rural localities in Vologda Oblast bear this name:

- Pokrovskoye, Chagodoshchensky District, Vologda Oblast, a selo in Pokrovsky Selsoviet of Chagodoshchensky District
- Pokrovskoye, Cherepovetsky District, Vologda Oblast, a village in Batransky Selsoviet of Cherepovetsky District
- Pokrovskoye, Pokrovsky Selsoviet, Gryazovetsky District, Vologda Oblast, a village in Pokrovsky Selsoviet of Gryazovetsky District
- Pokrovskoye, Yurovsky Selsoviet, Gryazovetsky District, Vologda Oblast, a village in Yurovsky Selsoviet of Gryazovetsky District
- Pokrovskoye, Ugolsky Selsoviet, Sheksninsky District, Vologda Oblast, a village in Ugolsky Selsoviet of Sheksninsky District
- Pokrovskoye, Zheleznodorozhny Selsoviet, Sheksninsky District, Vologda Oblast, a village in Zheleznodorozhny Selsoviet of Sheksninsky District
- Pokrovskoye, Chuchkovsky Selsoviet, Sokolsky District, Vologda Oblast, a village in Chuchkovsky Selsoviet of Sokolsky District
- Pokrovskoye, Kokoshilovsky Selsoviet, Sokolsky District, Vologda Oblast, a village in Kokoshilovsky Selsoviet of Sokolsky District
- Pokrovskoye, Vashkinsky District, Vologda Oblast, a village in Pokrovsky Selsoviet of Vashkinsky District
- Pokrovskoye, Vologodsky District, Vologda Oblast, a village in Borisovsky Selsoviet of Vologodsky District
- Pokrovskoye, Vozhegodsky District, Vologda Oblast, a selo in Yavengsky Selsoviet of Vozhegodsky District
- Pokrovskaya, Vologda Oblast, a village in Punemsky Selsoviet of Vozhegodsky District

== Voronezh Oblast ==
As of 2010, two rural localities in Voronezh Oblast bear this name:

- Pokrovsky, Voznesenovskoye Rural Settlement, Talovsky District, Voronezh Oblast, a settlement in Voznesenovskoye Rural Settlement of Talovsky District
- Pokrovsky, Voznesenskoye Rural Settlement, Talovsky District, Voronezh Oblast, a settlement in Voznesenskoye Rural Settlement of Talovsky District

== Yaroslavl Oblast ==
As of 2010, three rural localities in Yaroslavl Oblast bear this name:

- Pokrovskoye, Pokrovsky Rural Okrug, Borisoglebsky District, Yaroslavl Oblast, a selo in Pokrovsky Rural Okrug of Borisoglebsky District
- Pokrovskoye, Ramensky Rural Okrug, Borisoglebsky District, Yaroslavl Oblast, a selo in Ramensky Rural Okrug of Borisoglebsky District
- Pokrovskoye, Uglichsky District, Yaroslavl Oblast, a selo in Pokrovsky Rural Okrug of Uglichsky District
