= Borodino, Kursk Oblast =

Rural locality in Kursk Oblast, Russia

Borodino Бородино
- Village
- Interactive map of Borodino
- Location of Borodino Borodino (Kursk Oblast)
- Coordinates: 51°32′20″N 35°33′08″E
- Country: Russia
- Federal subject: Kursk Oblast
- Administrative district: Kurchatovsky District
- SelsovietSelsoviet: Kolpakovsky

Population (2010 Census)
  - Total: 46
  - Estimate (2010): 46 (0%)

Municipal status
  - Municipal district: Kurchatovsky Municipal District
  - Rural settlement: Kolpakovsky Selsoviet Rural Settlement
- Time zone: UTC+3 (MSK)
- Postal code: 307231
- Dialing code: +7 47131
- OKTMO ID: 38621418111

Borodino (Russian: Бородино) is a rural locality (a village) in Kolpakovsky Selsoviet Rural Settlement, Kurchatovsky District, Kursk Oblast, Russia. Population: 46 (2010 census); 62 (2002 census);

== Geography ==
The village is located in the Reut River basin, 49 km south-west of Kursk, 15 km south-west of the district center – the town Kurchatov, 4.5 km from the selsoviet center – Novosergeyevka.

Climate

Borodino has a warm-summer humid continental climate (Dfb in the Köppen climate classification).

== Transport ==
Borodino is located 34.5 km from the federal route M-2 Crimea Highway, 9.5 km from road of regional importance 38K-017 (Kursk – Lgov – Rylsk – border with Ukraine), 9 km from 38K-010 (M2 – Ivanino), 12 km from 38K-004 (Dyakonovo – Sudzha – border with Ukraine), 3 km from intermunicipal significance 38H-086 (38K-004 – Lyubimovka – Imeni Karla Libknekhta), 2 km from 38H-090 (38H-086 – Kolpakovo – Ivanino), on the road 38H-089 (38H-086 – Sopelovka), 10 km from the nearest railway station Blokhino (railway line Lgov I — Kursk).

The rural locality is situated 56 km from Kursk Vostochny Airport, 122 km from Belgorod International Airport and 256 km from Voronezh Peter the Great Airport.
