= Novosergeyevka =

Novosergeyevka (Russian: Преображеновка) is the name of several rural localities in Russia:

- Novosergeyevka, a selo, the administrative center of Novosergeyevsky Selsoviet of Arkharinsky District, Amur Oblast
- Novosergeyevka, a selo in Novosergeyevsky Selsoviet of Seryshevsky District, Amur Oblast
- Novosergeyevka – a village, the administrative center of Kolpakovsky Selsoviet of Kurchatovsky District, Kursk Oblast
- Novosergeyevka – a village in Kolpakovsky Selsoviet of Kurchatovsky District, Kursk Oblast
