= Soldatskoye, Kurchatovsky District, Kursk Oblast =

Rural locality in Kursk Oblast, Russia

Soldatskoye Солдатское
- Village
- Interactive map of Soldatskoye
- Location of Soldatskoye Soldatskoye (Kursk Oblast)
- Coordinates: 51°31′47″N 35°36′35″E
- Country: Russia
- Federal subject: Kursk Oblast
- Administrative district: Kurchatovsky District
- SelsovietSelsoviet: Kolpakovsky

Population (2010 Census)
  - Total: 11
  - Estimate (2010): 11 (0%)

Municipal status
  - Municipal district: Kurchatovsky Municipal District
  - Rural settlement: Kolpakovsky Selsoviet Rural Settlement
- Time zone: UTC+3 (MSK)
- Postal code: 307231
- Dialing code: +7 47131
- OKTMO ID: 38621418126

Soldatskoye (Russian: Солдатское) is a rural locality (a village) in Kolpakovsky Selsoviet Rural Settlement, Kurchatovsky District, Kursk Oblast, Russia. Population: 11 (2010 census); 22 (2002 census);

== Geography ==
The village is located in the Reut River basin, 46 km south-west of Kursk, 14.5 km south-west of the district center – the town Kurchatov, 6 km from the selsoviet center – Novosergeyevka.

Climate

Soldatskoye has a warm-summer humid continental climate (Dfb in the Köppen climate classification).

== Transport ==
Soldatskoye is located 30.5 km from the federal route M-2 Crimea Highway, 12 km from road of regional importance 38K-017 (Kursk – Lgov – Rylsk – border with Ukraine), 7.5 km from 38K-010 (M2 – Ivanino), 9 km from 38K-004 (Dyakonovo – Sudzha – border with Ukraine), 3 km from intermunicipal significance 38H-086 (38K-004 – Lyubimovka – Imeni Karla Libknekhta), 1 km from 38H-090 (38H-086 – Kolpakovo – Ivanino), 13 km from the nearest railway station Blokhino (railway line Lgov I — Kursk).

The rural locality is situated 53 km from Kursk Vostochny Airport, 119 km from Belgorod International Airport and 252 km from Voronezh Peter the Great Airport.
