= Pavlovka, Kurchatovsky District, Kursk Oblast =

Rural locality in Kursk Oblast, Russia

Pavlovka Павловка
- Village
- Interactive map of Pavlovka
- Location of Pavlovka Pavlovka (Kursk Oblast)
- Coordinates: 51°31′15″N 35°31′12″E
- Country: Russia
- Federal subject: Kursk Oblast
- Administrative district: Kurchatovsky District
- SelsovietSelsoviet: Kolpakovsky

Population (2010 Census)
  - Total: 27
  - Estimate (2010): 27 (0%)

Municipal status
  - Municipal district: Kurchatovsky Municipal District
  - Rural settlement: Kolpakovsky Selsoviet Rural Settlement
- Time zone: UTC+3 (MSK)
- Postal code: 307231
- Dialing code: +7 47131
- OKTMO ID: 38621418121

Pavlovka (Russian: Павловка) is a rural locality (a village) in Kolpakovsky Selsoviet Rural Settlement, Kurchatovsky District, Kursk Oblast, Russia. Population: 27 (2010 census); 35 (2002 census);

== Geography ==
The village is located on the Bobrik River, 52 km south-west of Kursk, 18 km south-west of the district center – the town Kurchatov, 2.5 km from the selsoviet center – Novosergeyevka.

Climate

Pavlovka has a warm-summer humid continental climate (Dfb in the Köppen climate classification).

== Transport ==
Pavlovka is located 36.5 km from the federal route M-2 Crimea Highway, 11 km from road of regional importance 38K-017 (Kursk – Lgov – Rylsk – border with Ukraine), 12.5 km from 38K-010 (M2 – Ivanino), 11.5 km from 38K-004 (Dyakonovo – Sudzha – border with Ukraine), on the road of intermunicipal significance 38H-086 (38K-004 – Lyubimovka – Imeni Karla Libknekhta), 2 km from 38H-090 (38H-086 – Kolpakovo – Ivanino), 13 km from the nearest railway halt 412 km (railway line Lgov I — Kursk).

The rural locality is situated 59 km from Kursk Vostochny Airport, 121 km from Belgorod International Airport and 259 km from Voronezh Peter the Great Airport.
