= Komyakino =

Rural locality in Kursk Oblast, Russia

Komyakino Комякино
- Village
- Interactive map of Komyakino
- Location of Komyakino Komyakino (Kursk Oblast)
- Coordinates: 51°36′15″N 35°33′32″E
- Country: Russia
- Federal subject: Kursk Oblast
- Administrative district: Kurchatovsky District
- SelsovietSelsoviet: Druzhnensky

Population (2010 Census)
  - Total: 108
  - Estimate (2010): 108 (0%)

Municipal status
  - Municipal district: Kurchatovsky Municipal District
  - Rural settlement: Druzhnensky Selsoviet Rural Settlement
- Time zone: UTC+3 (MSK)
- Postal code: 307230
- Dialing code: +7 47131
- OKTMO ID: 38621410106

Komyakino (Russian: Комякино) is a rural locality (a village) in Druzhnensky Selsoviet Rural Settlement, Kurchatovsky District, Kursk Oblast, Russia. Population: 108 (2010 census); 130 (2002 census);

== Geography ==
The village is located on the Reut River, 46 km south-west of Kursk, 8.5 km south-west of the district center – the town Kurchatov, 2 km from the selsoviet center – Druzhnaya

Climate

Komyakino has a warm-summer humid continental climate (Dfb in the Köppen climate classification).

== Transport ==
Komyakino is located 35.5 km from the federal route M-2 Crimea Highway, 2 km from road of regional importance 38K-017 (Kursk – Lgov – Rylsk – border with Ukraine), 3 km from 38K-010 (M2 – Ivanino), 18 km from 38K-004 (Dyakonovo – Sudzha – border with Ukraine), 5 km from intermunicipal significance 38H-086 (38K-004 – Lyubimovka – Imeni Karla Libknekhta), on the road 38H-090 (38H-086 – Kolpakovo – Ivanino), 4 km from the nearest railway station Blokhino (railway line Lgov I — Kursk).

The rural locality is situated 53 km from Kursk Vostochny Airport, 128 km from Belgorod International Airport and 255 km from Voronezh Peter the Great Airport.
