= Annino-Gusinovka =

Rural locality in Kursk Oblast, Russia

Annino-Gusinovka Аннино-Гусиновка
- Village
- Interactive map of Annino-Gusinovka
- Location of Annino-Gusinovka Annino-Gusinovka (Kursk Oblast)
- Coordinates: 51°28′57″N 35°34′42″E
- Country: Russia
- Federal subject: Kursk Oblast
- Administrative district: Kurchatovsky District
- SelsovietSelsoviet: Kolpakovsky

Population (2010 Census)
  - Total: 52
  - Estimate (2010): 52 (0%)

Municipal status
  - Municipal district: Kurchatovsky Municipal District
  - Rural settlement: Kolpakovsky Selsoviet Rural Settlement
- Time zone: UTC+3 (MSK)
- Postal code: 307233
- Dialing code: +7 47131
- OKTMO ID: 38621418136

Annino-Gusinovka (Russian: Аннино-Гусиновка) is a rural locality (a village) in Kolpakovsky Selsoviet Rural Settlement, Kurchatovsky District, Kursk Oblast, Russia. Population: 52 (2010 census); 75 (2002 census);

== Geography ==
The village is located in the Reut River basin, 51 km south-west of Kursk, 20 km south-west of the district center – the town Kurchatov, 4 km from the selsoviet center – Novosergeyevka.

Climate

Annino-Gusinovka has a warm-summer humid continental climate (Dfb in the Köppen climate classification).

== Transport ==
Annino-Gusinovka is located 32.5 km from the federal route M-2 Crimea Highway, 16 km from road of regional importance 38K-017 (Kursk – Lgov – Rylsk – border with Ukraine), 12.5 km from 38K-010 (M2 – Ivanino), 5.5 km from 38K-004 (Dyakonovo – Sudzha – border with Ukraine), 1 km from intermunicipal significance 38H-086 (38K-004 – Lyubimovka – Imeni Karla Libknekhta), 4 km from 38H-090 (38H-086 – Kolpakovo – Ivanino), 16 km from the nearest railway station Blokhino (railway line Lgov I — Kursk).

The rural locality is situated 58 km from Kursk Vostochny Airport, 116 km from Belgorod International Airport and 255 km from Voronezh Peter the Great Airport.
