= Lyutchina =

Rural locality in Kursk Oblast, Russia

Lyutchina Лютчина
- Village
- Interactive map of Lyutchina
- Location of Lyutchina Lyutchina (Kursk Oblast)
- Coordinates: 51°35′40″N 35°55′11″E
- Country: Russia
- Federal subject: Kursk Oblast
- Administrative district: Oktyabrsky District
- SelsovietSelsoviet: Dyakonovsky

Population (2010 Census)
  - Total: 79
  - Estimate (2010): 79 (0%)

Municipal status
  - Municipal district: Oktyabrsky Municipal District
  - Rural settlement: Dyakonovsky Selsoviet Rural Settlement
- Time zone: UTC+3 (MSK)
- Postal code: 307213
- Dialing code: +7 47142
- OKTMO ID: 38628412111
- Website: djakonovo.rkursk.ru

Lyutchina (Russian: Лютчина) is a rural locality (Russian: деревня, lit. 'village') in Dyakonovsky Selsoviet Rural Settlement, Oktyabrsky District, Kursk Oblast, Russia. Population: 79 (2010 census); 85 (2002 census);

== Geography ==
The village is located on the Vorobzha River (a left tributary of the Seym River), 68 km from the Russia–Ukraine border, 20 km south-west of Kursk, 6 km south-west of the district center – the urban-type settlement Pryamitsyno, 1 km from the selsoviet center – Dyakonovo.

Climate

Lyutchina has a warm-summer humid continental climate (Dfb in the Köppen climate classification).

== Transport ==
Lyutchina is located 3 km from the road of regional importance 38K-010 ("Crimea Highway" – Ivanino, part of the European route E38), 4.5 km from the road 38K-004 (Dyakonovo – Sudzha – border with Ukraine), on the road of intermunicipal significance 38H-072 (a part of the selo Dyakonovo: 4th Okolotok – Zhuravlinsky, Zhuravlino – Asphalt plant of Oktyabrsky District), 6.5 km from the nearest railway station Dyakonovo (railway line Lgov I — Kursk).

The rural locality is situated 31 km from Kursk Vostochny Airport, 114 km from Belgorod International Airport and 230 km from Voronezh Peter the Great Airport.
