= Sopelovka =

Rural locality in Kursk Oblast, Russia

Sopelovka Сопеловка
- Village
- Interactive map of Sopelovka
- Location of Sopelovka Sopelovka (Kursk Oblast)
- Coordinates: 51°28′57″N 35°34′42″E
- Country: Russia
- Federal subject: Kursk Oblast
- Administrative district: Kurchatovsky District
- SelsovietSelsoviet: Kolpakovsky

Population (2010 Census)
  - Total: 53
  - Estimate (2010): 53 (0%)

Municipal status
  - Municipal district: Kurchatovsky Municipal District
  - Rural settlement: Kolpakovsky Selsoviet Rural Settlement
- Time zone: UTC+3 (MSK)
- Postal code: 307231
- Dialing code: +7 47131
- OKTMO ID: 38621418106

Sopelovka (Russian: Сопеловка) is a rural locality (a village) in Kolpakovsky Selsoviet Rural Settlement, Kurchatovsky District, Kursk Oblast, Russia. Population: 53 (2010 census); 65 (2002 census);

== Geography ==
The village is located in the Reut River basin, 48 km south-west of Kursk, 14 km south-west of the district center – the town Kurchatov, 5.5 km from the selsoviet center – Novosergeyevka.

Climate

Sopelovka has a warm-summer humid continental climate (Dfb in the Köppen climate classification).

== Transport ==
Sopelovka is located 32.5 km from the federal route M-2 Crimea Highway, 10.5 km from road of regional importance 38K-017 (Kursk – Lgov – Rylsk – border with Ukraine), 8 km from 38K-010 (M2 – Ivanino), 11 km from 38K-004 (Dyakonovo – Sudzha – border with Ukraine), 4.5 km from intermunicipal significance 38H-086 (38K-004 – Lyubimovka – Imeni Karla Libknekhta), on the roads 38H-090 (38N-086 – Kolpakovo – Ivanino) and 38H-089 (38N-086 – Sopelovka), 13 km from the nearest railway station Blokhino (railway line Lgov I — Kursk).

The rural locality is situated 55 km from Kursk Vostochny Airport, 122 km from Belgorod International Airport and 254 km from Voronezh Peter the Great Airport.
