= Nikolskiy, Kurchatovsky District, Kursk Oblast =

Rural locality in Kursk Oblast, Russia

Nikolskiy Никольский
- Settlement
- Interactive map of Nikolskiy
- Location of Nikolskiy Nikolskiy (Kursk Oblast)
- Coordinates: 51°30′08″N 35°37′12″E
- Country: Russia
- Federal subject: Kursk Oblast
- Administrative district: Kurchatovsky District
- SelsovietSelsoviet: Kolpakovsky

Population (2010 Census)
  - Total: 287
  - Estimate (2010): 287 (0%)

Municipal status
  - Municipal district: Kurchatovsky Municipal District
  - Rural settlement: Kolpakovsky Selsoviet Rural Settlement
- Time zone: UTC+3 (MSK)
- Postal code: 307233
- Dialing code: +7 47131
- OKTMO ID: 38621418131

Nikolskiy (Russian: Никольский) is a rural locality (a settlement) in Kolpakovsky Selsoviet Rural Settlement, Kurchatovsky District, Kursk Oblast, Russia. Population: 287 (2010 census); 312 (2002 census);

== Geography ==
The settlement is located in the Reut River basin, 47 km south-west of Kursk, 17.5 km south-west of the district center – the town Kurchatov, 6 km from the selsoviet center – Novosergeyevka.

Climate

Nikolskiy has a warm-summer humid continental climate (Dfb in the Köppen climate classification).

== Transport ==
Nikolskiy is located 30 km from the federal route M-2 Crimea Highway, 15 km from road of regional importance 38K-017 (Kursk – Lgov – Rylsk – border with Ukraine), 9,5 km from 38K-010 (M2 – Ivanino), 6 km from 38K-004 (Dyakonovo – Sudzha – border with Ukraine), on the road of intermunicipal significance 38H-086 (38K-004 – Lyubimovka – Imeni Karla Libknekhta), 16 km from the nearest railway station Blokhino (railway line Lgov I — Kursk).

The rural locality is situated 54 km from Kursk Vostochny Airport, 116 km from Belgorod International Airport and 252 km from Voronezh Peter the Great Airport.
