= Lyubitskoye, Kurchatovsky District, Kursk Oblast =

Rural locality in Kursk Oblast, Russia

Lyubitskoye Любицкое
- Village
- Interactive map of Lyubitskoye
- Location of Lyubitskoye Lyubitskoye (Kursk Oblast)
- Coordinates: 51°34′46″N 35°34′20″E
- Country: Russia
- Federal subject: Kursk Oblast
- Administrative district: Kurchatovsky District
- SelsovietSelsoviet: Druzhnensky

Population (2010 Census)
  - Total: 81
  - Estimate (2010): 81 (0%)

Municipal status
  - Municipal district: Kurchatovsky Municipal District
  - Rural settlement: Druzhnensky Selsoviet Rural Settlement
- Time zone: UTC+3 (MSK)
- Postal code: 307230
- Dialing code: +7 47131
- OKTMO ID: 38621410111

Lyubitskoye (Russian: Любицкое) is a rural locality (a village) in Druzhnensky Selsoviet Rural Settlement, Kurchatovsky District, Kursk Oblast, Russia. Population: 81 (2010 census); 142 (2002 census);

== Geography ==
The village is located on the Reut River, 46 km south-west of Kursk, 10 km south-west of the district center – the town Kurchatov, 4.5 km from the selsoviet center – Druzhnaya

Climate

Lyubitskoye has a warm-summer humid continental climate (Dfb in the Köppen climate classification).

Climate data for Lyubitskoye
Month	Jan	Feb	Mar	Apr	May	Jun	Jul	Aug	Sep	Oct	Nov	Dec	Year
Mean daily maximum °C (°F)	−3.9 (25.0)	−2.9 (26.8)	3 (37)	13.2 (55.8)	19.5 (67.1)	22.8 (73.0)	25.3 (77.5)	24.7 (76.5)	18.3 (64.9)	10.7 (51.3)	3.5 (38.3)	−1.1 (30.0)	11.1 (51.9)
Daily mean °C (°F)	−6 (21)	−5.5 (22.1)	−0.6 (30.9)	8.4 (47.1)	14.9 (58.8)	18.5 (65.3)	21 (70)	20.1 (68.2)	14.1 (57.4)	7.4 (45.3)	1.3 (34.3)	−3 (27)	7.6 (45.6)
Mean daily minimum °C (°F)	−8.5 (16.7)	−8.6 (16.5)	−4.7 (23.5)	2.9 (37.2)	9.2 (48.6)	13.1 (55.6)	15.9 (60.6)	15 (59)	9.8 (49.6)	4 (39)	−1 (30)	−5.2 (22.6)	3.5 (38.2)
Average precipitation mm (inches)	51 (2.0)	44 (1.7)	48 (1.9)	50 (2.0)	63 (2.5)	70 (2.8)	74 (2.9)	54 (2.1)	57 (2.2)	57 (2.2)	47 (1.9)	49 (1.9)	664 (26.1)
Source: https://en.climate-data.org/asia/russian-federation/kursk-oblast/любицкое-666161/

== Transport ==
Lyubitskoye is located 33.5 km from the federal route M-2 Crimea Highway, 6 km from road of regional importance 38K-017 (Kursk – Lgov – Rylsk – border with Ukraine), 5 km from 38K-010 (M2 – Ivanino), 15 km from 38K-004 (Dyakonovo – Sudzha – border with Ukraine), 6 km from intermunicipal significance 38H-086 (38K-004 – Lyubimovka – Imeni Karla Libknekhta), on the road 38H-090 (38H-086 – Kolpakovo – Ivanino), 7 km from the nearest railway station Blokhino (railway line Lgov I — Kursk).

The rural locality is situated 53 km from Kursk Vostochny Airport, 124 km from Belgorod International Airport and 254 km from Voronezh Peter the Great Airport.
