= Gorbulino =

Rural locality in Kursk Oblast, Russia

Gorbulino Горбулино
- Khutor
- Interactive map of Gorbulino
- Location of Gorbulino Gorbulino (Kursk Oblast)
- Coordinates: 51°33′44″N 35°58′24″E
- Country: Russia
- Federal subject: Kursk Oblast
- Administrative district: Oktyabrsky District
- SelsovietSelsoviet: Lobazovsky

Population (2010 Census)
  - Total: 7
  - Estimate (2010): 7 (0%)

Municipal status
  - Municipal district: Oktyabrsky Municipal District
  - Rural settlement: Lobazovsky Selsoviet Rural Settlement
- Time zone: UTC+3 (MSK)
- Postal code: 307205
- Dialing code: +7 47142
- OKTMO ID: 38628420106
- Website: lobazovka.ru

Gorbulino (Russian: Горбулино) is a rural locality (a khutor) in Lobazovsky Selsoviet Rural Settlement, Oktyabrsky District, Kursk Oblast, Russia. Population: 7 (2010 census); 10 (2002 census);

== Geography ==
The khutor is located 69 km from the Russia–Ukraine border, 20 km south-west of Kursk, 9 km south of the district center – the urban-type settlement Pryamitsyno, at the western border of the selsoviet center – Zhuravlino.

Climate

Gorbulino has a warm-summer humid continental climate (Dfb in the Köppen climate classification).

== Transport ==
Gorbulino is located 6 km from the federal route M-2 Crimea Highway (a part of the European route E105), on the road of regional importance 38K-010 ("Crimea Highway" – Ivanino, part of the European route E38), on the road of intermunicipal significance 38H-215 (38K-010 – Lebedin), 9 km from the nearest railway station Dyakonovo (railway line Lgov I — Kursk).

The rural locality is situated 30 km from Kursk Vostochny Airport, 109 km from Belgorod International Airport and 226 km from Voronezh Peter the Great Airport.
