= Yakovlevka =

Yakovlevka (Russian: Я́ковлевка) is the name of several rural localities in Russia:

- Yakovlevka, Karmaskalinsky District, Republic of Bashkortostan, a village in Adzitarovsky Selsoviet of Karmaskalinsky District of the Republic of Bashkortostan
- Yakovlevka, Khaybullinsky District, Republic of Bashkortostan, a selo in Tatyr-Uzyaksky Selsoviet of Khaybullinsky District of the Republic of Bashkortostan
- Yakovlevka, Belgorod Oblast, a selo in Novooskolsky District of Belgorod Oblast
- Yakovlevka, Kaliningrad Oblast, abandoned village in Nesterovsky District of Kaliningrad Oblast
- Yakovlevka, Kemerovo Oblast, a settlement in Polutornikovskaya Rural Territory of Tashtagolsky District of Kemerovo Oblast
- Yakovlevka, Kurgan Oblast, a village in Chistovsky Selsoviet of Shchuchansky District of Kurgan Oblast
- Yakovlevka, Oktyabrsky District, Kursk Oblast, a village in Artyukhovsky Selsoviet of Oktyabrsky District of Kursk Oblast
- Yakovlevka, Pristensky District, Kursk Oblast, a village in Kotovsky Selsoviet of Pristensky District of Kursk Oblast
- Yakovlevka, Gryazinsky District, Lipetsk Oblast, a village in Karamyshevsky Selsoviet of Gryazinsky District of Lipetsk Oblast
- Yakovlevka, Lubnovsky Selsoviet, Lipetsky District, Lipetsk Oblast, a village in Lubnovsky Selsoviet of Lipetsky District of Lipetsk Oblast
- Yakovlevka, Sentsovsky Selsoviet, Lipetsky District, Lipetsk Oblast, a village in Sentsovsky Selsoviet of Lipetsky District of Lipetsk Oblast
- Yakovlevka, Nizhny Novgorod Oblast, a selo in Diveyevsky Selsoviet of Diveyevsky District of Nizhny Novgorod Oblast
- Yakovlevka, Omsk Oblast, a village in Astyrovsky Rural Okrug of Gorkovsky District of Omsk Oblast
- Yakovlevka, Abdulinsky District, Orenburg Oblast, a selo in Iskrinsky Selsoviet of Abdulinsky District of Orenburg Oblast
- Yakovlevka, Asekeyevsky District, Orenburg Oblast, a selo in Yakovlevsky Selsoviet of Asekeyevsky District of Orenburg Oblast
- Yakovlevka, Grachyovsky District, Orenburg Oblast, a selo in Alexandrovsky Selsoviet of Grachyovsky District of Orenburg Oblast
- Yakovlevka, Saraktashsky District, Orenburg Oblast, a selo in Nadezhdinsky Selsoviet of Saraktashsky District of Orenburg Oblast
- Yakovlevka, Penza Oblast, a selo in Yakovlevsky Selsoviet of Bekovsky District of Penza Oblast
- Yakovlevka, Perm Krai, a village in Ordinsky District of Perm Krai
- Yakovlevka, Primorsky Krai, a selo in Yakovlevsky District of Primorsky Krai
- Yakovlevka, Saratov Oblast, a selo in Bazarno-Karabulaksky District of Saratov Oblast
- Yakovlevka, Tambov Oblast, a village in Karpelsky Selsoviet of Mordovsky District of Tambov Oblast
- Yakovlevka, Vologda Oblast, a village in Pertsevsky Selsoviet of Gryazovetsky District of Vologda Oblast

== See also ==
- Yakovlivka, settlements in Ukraine with the equivalent Ukrainian-language name
