= Pokrovskoye, Oktyabrsky District, Kursk Oblast =

Rural locality in Kursk Oblast, Russia

Pokrovskoye Покровское
- Selo
- Interactive map of Pokrovskoye
- Location of Pokrovskoye Pokrovskoye (Kursk Oblast)
- Coordinates: 51°34′45″N 35°45′35″E
- Country: Russia
- Federal subject: Kursk Oblast
- Administrative district: Oktyabrsky District
- SelsovietSelsoviet: Artyukhovsky

Population (2010 Census)
  - Total: 102
  - Estimate (2010): 102 (0%)

Municipal status
  - Municipal district: Oktyabrsky Municipal District
  - Rural settlement: Artyukhovsky Selsoviet Rural Settlement
- Time zone: UTC+3 (MSK)
- Postal code: 307203
- Dialing code: +7 47142
- OKTMO ID: 38628404146
- Website: www.artuhovskiy.ru

Pokrovskoye (Russian: Покровское) is a rural locality (Russian: село, lit. 'village') in Artyukhovsky Selsoviet Rural Settlement, Oktyabrsky District, Kursk Oblast, Russia. Population: 102 (2010 census); 150 (2002 census);

== Geography ==
The village is located on the Dichnya River (a left tributary of the Seym River), 58 km from the Russia–Ukraine border, 30 km south-west of Kursk, 13 km south-west of the district center – the urban-type settlement Pryamitsyno, at the northern border of the selsoviet center – Artyukhovka.

Climate

Pokrovskoye has a warm-summer humid continental climate (Dfb in the Köppen climate classification).

== Transport ==
Pokrovskoye is located 21 km from the federal route M-2 Crimea Highway (a part of the European route E105), on the road of regional importance 38K-010 ("Crimea Highway" – Ivanino, part of the European route E38), on the road of intermunicipal significance 38H-214 (38K-010 – Verkhnyaya Malykhina), 8 km from the nearest railway halt 433 km (railway line Lgov I — Kursk).

The rural locality is situated 41 km from Kursk Vostochny Airport, 117 km from Belgorod International Airport and 241 km from Voronezh Peter the Great Airport.
