= Okhochevka, Oktyabrsky District, Kursk Oblast =

Rural locality in Kursk Oblast, Russia

Okhochevka Охочевка
- Village
- Interactive map of Okhochevka
- Location of Okhochevka Okhochevka (Kursk Oblast)
- Coordinates: 51°31′05″N 35°55′00″E
- Country: Russia
- Federal subject: Kursk Oblast
- Administrative district: Oktyabrsky District
- SelsovietSelsoviet: Plotavsky

Population (2010 Census)
  - Total: 56
  - Estimate (2010): 56 (0%)

Municipal status
  - Municipal district: Oktyabrsky Municipal District
  - Rural settlement: Plotavsky Selsoviet Rural Settlement
- Time zone: UTC+3 (MSK)
- Postal code: 307206
- Dialing code: +7 47142
- OKTMO ID: 38628426111
- Website: plotavss.ru

Okhochevka (Russian: Охочевка) is a rural locality (Russian: деревня, lit. 'village') in Plotavsky Selsoviet Rural Settlement, Oktyabrsky District, Kursk Oblast, Russia. Population: 56 (2010 census); 78 (2002 census);

== Geography ==
The village is located on the Vorobzha River (a left tributary of the Seym River), 63 km from the Russia–Ukraine border, 27 km south-west of Kursk, 15 km south-west of the district center – the urban-type settlement Pryamitsyno, 2 km from the selsoviet center – Plotava.

Climate

Okhochevka has a warm-summer humid continental climate (Dfb in the Köppen climate classification).

== Transport ==
Okhochevka is located 9 km from the federal route M-2 Crimea Highway (a part of the European route E105), 6 km from the road of regional importance 38K-004 (Dyakonovo – Sudzha – border with Ukraine), 5 km from the road 38K-010 ("Crimea Highway" – Ivanino, part of the European route E38), 1 km from the road of intermunicipal significance 38H-094 (38K-004 – Plotava), 14 km from the nearest railway halt 439 km (railway line Lgov I — Kursk).

The rural locality is situated 36 km from Kursk Vostochny Airport, 107 km from Belgorod International Airport and 232 km from Voronezh Peter the Great Airport.
