= Gremyachka, Oktyabrsky District, Kursk Oblast =

Rural locality in Kursk Oblast, Russia

Gremyachka Гремячка
- Village
- Interactive map of Gremyachka
- Location of Gremyachka Gremyachka (Kursk Oblast)
- Coordinates: 51°33′02″N 35°55′33″E
- Country: Russia
- Federal subject: Kursk Oblast
- Administrative district: Oktyabrsky District
- SelsovietSelsoviet: Lobazovsky

Population (2010 Census)
  - Total: 232
  - Estimate (2010): 232 (0%)

Municipal status
  - Municipal district: Oktyabrsky Municipal District
  - Rural settlement: Lobazovsky Selsoviet Rural Settlement
- Time zone: UTC+3 (MSK)
- Postal code: 307205
- Dialing code: +7 47142
- OKTMO ID: 38628420111
- Website: lobazovka.ru

Gremyachka (Russian: Гремячка) is a rural locality (Russian: деревня, lit. 'village') in Lobazovsky Selsoviet Rural Settlement, Oktyabrsky District, Kursk Oblast, Russia. Population: 232 (2010 census); 232 (2002 census);

== Geography ==
The village is located on the Vorobzha River (a left tributary of the Seym River), 66 km from the Russia–Ukraine border, 23 km south-west of Kursk, 10 km south of the district center – the urban-type settlement Pryamitsyno, 2.5 km from the selsoviet center – Zhuravlino.

Climate

Gremyachka has a warm-summer humid continental climate (Dfb in the Köppen climate classification).

== Transport ==
Gremyachka is located 9 km from the federal route M-2 Crimea Highway (a part of the European route E105), 1.5 km from the road of regional importance 38K-010 ("Crimea Highway" – Ivanino, part of the European route E38), on the road of intermunicipal significance 38H-774 (Lobazovka – Gremyachka – Yuryevka), 11 km from the nearest railway station Dyakonovo (railway line Lgov I — Kursk).

The rural locality is situated 33 km from Kursk Vostochny Airport, 109 km from Belgorod International Airport and 230 km from Voronezh Peter the Great Airport.
