= Sovetskaya Derevnya =

Rural locality in Kursk Oblast, Russia

Sovetskaya Derevnya Советская Деревня
- Khutor
- Interactive map of Sovetskaya Derevnya
- Location of Sovetskaya Derevnya Sovetskaya Derevnya (Kursk Oblast)
- Coordinates: 51°33′28″N 35°47′57″E
- Country: Russia
- Federal subject: Kursk Oblast
- Administrative district: Oktyabrsky District
- SelsovietSelsoviet: Plotavsky

Population (2010 Census)
  - Total: 5
  - Estimate (2010): 5 (0%)

Municipal status
  - Municipal district: Oktyabrsky Municipal District
  - Rural settlement: Plotavsky Selsoviet Rural Settlement
- Time zone: UTC+3 (MSK)
- Postal code: 307206
- Dialing code: +7 47142
- OKTMO ID: 38628426121
- Website: plotavss.ru

Sovetskaya Derevnya (Russian: Советская Деревня) is a rural locality (a khutor) in Plotavsky Selsoviet Rural Settlement, Oktyabrsky District, Kursk Oblast, Russia. Population: 5 (2010 census); 11 (2002 census);

== Geography ==
The khutor is located 59 km from the Russia–Ukraine border, 29 km south-west of Kursk, 13 km south-west of the district center – the urban-type settlement Pryamitsyno, 8 km from the selsoviet center – Plotava.

Climate

Sovetskaya Derevnya has a warm-summer humid continental climate (Dfb in the Köppen climate classification).

== Transport ==
Sovetskaya Derevnya is located 17.5 km from the federal route M-2 Crimea Highway (a part of the European route E105), 1.5 km from the road of regional importance 38K-004 (Dyakonovo – Sudzha – border with Ukraine), 1 km from the road 38K-010 ("Crimea Highway" – Ivanino, part of the European route E38), 9 km from the nearest railway halt 439 km (railway line Lgov I — Kursk).

The rural locality is situated 40 km from Kursk Vostochny Airport, 114 km from Belgorod International Airport and 239 km from Voronezh Peter the Great Airport.
