= Lyubitskoye =

Lyubitskoye (Russian: Любицкое) is the name of several rural localities in Russia:

- Lyubitskoye, a village in Kurchatovsky District, Kursk Oblast
- Lyubitskoye, a selo in Medvensky District, Kursk Oblast
- Lyubitskoye, a selo in Pugachyovsky District, Saratov Oblast
