= Kalinovka, Selsoviet Artyukhovsky, Oktyabrsky District, Kursk Oblast =

Rural locality in Kursk Oblast, Russia

Kalinovka Калиновка
- Khutor
- Interactive map of Kalinovka
- Location of Kalinovka Kalinovka (Kursk Oblast)
- Coordinates: 51°32′25″N 35°46′13″E
- Country: Russia
- Federal subject: Kursk Oblast
- Administrative district: Oktyabrsky District
- SelsovietSelsoviet: Artyukhovsky

Population (2010 Census)
  - Total: 0
  - Estimate (2010): 0 )

Municipal status
  - Municipal district: Oktyabrsky Municipal District
  - Rural settlement: Artyukhovsky Selsoviet Rural Settlement
- Time zone: UTC+3 (MSK)
- Postal code: 307203
- Dialing code: +7 47142
- OKTMO ID: 38628404126
- Website: www.artuhovskiy.ru

Kalinovka (Russian: Калиновка) is a rural locality (a khutor) in Artyukhovsky Selsoviet Rural Settlement, Oktyabrsky District, Kursk Oblast, Russia. Population: 0 (2010 census); 25 (2002 census);

== Geography ==
The khutor is located on the Dichnya River (a left tributary of the Seym River), 56 km from the Russia–Ukraine border, 31 km south-west of Kursk, 16 km south-west of the district center – the urban-type settlement Pryamitsyno, 3 km from the selsoviet center – Artyukhovka.

Climate

Kalinovka has a warm-summer humid continental climate (Dfb in the Köppen climate classification).

== Transport ==
Kalinovka is located 19.5 km from the federal route M-2 Crimea Highway (a part of the European route E105), 3 km from the road of regional importance 38K-010 ("Crimea Highway" – Ivanino, part of the European route E38), 12 km from the nearest railway halt 439 km (railway line Lgov I — Kursk).

The rural locality is situated 43 km from Kursk Vostochny Airport, 113 km from Belgorod International Airport and 241 km from Voronezh Peter the Great Airport.
