= Dontsy, Kursk Oblast =

Rural locality in Kursk Oblast, Russia

Dontsy Донцы
- Village
- Interactive map of Dontsy
- Location of Dontsy Dontsy (Kursk Oblast)
- Coordinates: 51°33′41″N 35°46′14″E
- Country: Russia
- Federal subject: Kursk Oblast
- Administrative district: Oktyabrsky District
- SelsovietSelsoviet: Artyukhovsky

Population (2010 Census)
  - Total: 15
  - Estimate (2010): 15 (0%)

Municipal status
  - Municipal district: Oktyabrsky Municipal District
  - Rural settlement: Artyukhovsky Selsoviet Rural Settlement
- Time zone: UTC+3 (MSK)
- Postal code: 307203
- Dialing code: +7 47142
- OKTMO ID: 38628404116
- Website: www.artuhovskiy.ru

Dontsy (Russian: Донцы) is a rural locality (Russian: деревня, lit. 'village') in Artyukhovsky Selsoviet Rural Settlement, Oktyabrsky District, Kursk Oblast, Russia. Population: 15 (2010 census); 26 (2002 census);

== Geography ==
The village is located on the Dichnya River (a left tributary of the Seym River), 57 km from the Russia–Ukraine border, 30 km south-west of Kursk, 14 km south-west of the district center – the urban-type settlement Pryamitsyno, at the еаstern border of the selsoviet center – Artyukhovka.

Climate

Dontsy has a warm-summer humid continental climate (Dfb in the Köppen climate classification).

== Transport ==
Dontsy is located 20 km from the federal route M-2 Crimea Highway (a part of the European route E105), 0.5 km from the road of regional importance 38K-010 ("Crimea Highway" – Ivanino, part of the European route E38), 10 km from the nearest railway halt 439 km (railway line Lgov I — Kursk).

The rural locality is situated 41 km from Kursk Vostochny Airport, 116 km from Belgorod International Airport and 240 km from Voronezh Peter the Great Airport.
