= Verkhniye Postoyalye Dvory =

Rural locality in Kursk Oblast, Russia

Verkhniye Postoyalye Dvory Верхние Постоялые Дворы
- Village
- Interactive map of Verkhniye Postoyalye Dvory
- Location of Verkhniye Postoyalye Dvory Verkhniye Postoyalye Dvory (Kursk Oblast)
- Coordinates: 51°32′23″N 35°49′34″E
- Country: Russia
- Federal subject: Kursk Oblast
- Administrative district: Oktyabrsky District
- SelsovietSelsoviet: Plotavsky

Population (2010 Census)
  - Total: 142
  - Estimate (2010): 142 (0%)

Municipal status
  - Municipal district: Oktyabrsky Municipal District
  - Rural settlement: Plotavsky Selsoviet Rural Settlement
- Time zone: UTC+3 (MSK)
- Postal code: 307206
- Dialing code: +7 47142
- OKTMO ID: 38628426106
- Website: plotavss.ru

Verkhniye Postoyalye Dvory (Russian: Верхние Постоялые Дворы) is a rural locality (Russian: деревня, lit. 'village') in Plotavsky Selsoviet Rural Settlement, Oktyabrsky District, Kursk Oblast, Russia. Population: 142 (2010 census); 164 (2002 census);

== Geography ==
The village is located 59 km from the Russia–Ukraine border, 29 km south-west of Kursk, 14 km south-west of the district center – the urban-type settlement Pryamitsyno, 6 km from the selsoviet center – Plotava.

Climate

Verkhniye Postoyalye Dvory has a warm-summer humid continental climate (Dfb in the Köppen climate classification).

== Transport ==
Verkhniye Postoyalye Dvory is located 15.5 km from the federal route M-2 Crimea Highway (a part of the European route E105), on the road of regional importance 38K-004 (Dyakonovo – Sudzha – border with Ukraine), 10.5 km from the nearest railway halt 439 km (railway line Lgov I — Kursk).

The rural locality is situated 39 km from Kursk Vostochny Airport, 111 km from Belgorod International Airport and 237 km from Voronezh Peter the Great Airport.
