= Skripkin =

Skripkin, feminine: Skripkina is a Russian surname. Notable people with the surname include:

- Artur Skripkin (born 1968), Soviet and Russian weightlifter
- Yuri Skripkin (1929–2016), Soviet and Russian medical scientist, dermatovenerologist, teacher and public figure
- Yuri Skripkin, drummer in Russian rock group Little Tragedies

== Fictional characters ==
- Pierre Skripkin from the play The Bedbug

== See also ==
- Skripkin, Kursk Oblast, village in Russia
