= Skripkin, Kursk Oblast =

Rural locality in Kursk Oblast, Russia

Skripkin Скрипкин
- Settlement
- Interactive map of Skripkin
- Location of Skripkin Skripkin (Kursk Oblast)
- Coordinates: 51°32′04″N 35°52′33″E
- Country: Russia
- Federal subject: Kursk Oblast
- Administrative district: Oktyabrsky District
- SelsovietSelsoviet: Plotavsky

Population (2010 Census)
  - Total: 92
  - Estimate (2010): 92 (0%)

Municipal status
  - Municipal district: Oktyabrsky Municipal District
  - Rural settlement: Plotavsky Selsoviet Rural Settlement
- Time zone: UTC+3 (MSK)
- Postal code: 307206
- Dialing code: +7 47142
- OKTMO ID: 38628426116
- Website: plotavss.ru

Skripkin (Russian: Скрипкин) is a rural locality (a settlement) in Plotavsky Selsoviet Rural Settlement, Oktyabrsky District, Kursk Oblast, Russia. Population: 92 (2010 census); 133 (2002 census);

== Geography ==
The settlement is located in the Vorobzha River basin (a left tributary of the Seym River), 61 km from the Russia–Ukraine border, 27 km south-west of Kursk, 14 km south-west of the district center – the urban-type settlement Pryamitsyno, 1 km from the selsoviet center – Plotava.

Climate

Skripkin has a warm-summer humid continental climate (Dfb in the Köppen climate classification).

== Transport ==
Skripkin is located 12 km from the federal route M-2 Crimea Highway (a part of the European route E105), 2.5 km from the road of regional importance 38K-004 (Dyakonovo – Sudzha – border with Ukraine), 3.5 km from the road 38K-010 ("Crimea Highway" – Ivanino, part of the European route E38), 1 km from the road of intermunicipal significance 38H-094 (38K-004 – Plotava), 11 km from the nearest railway halt 439 km (railway line Lgov I — Kursk).

The rural locality is situated 37 km from Kursk Vostochny Airport, 109 km from Belgorod International Airport and 233 km from Voronezh Peter the Great Airport.
