= Druzhnaya, Kursk Oblast =

Rural locality in Kursk Oblast, Russia

Druzhnaya Дружная
- Village
- Interactive map of Druzhnaya
- Location of Druzhnaya Druzhnaya (Kursk Oblast)
- Coordinates: 51°37′08″N 35°34′37″E
- Country: Russia
- Federal subject: Kursk Oblast
- Administrative district: Kurchatovsky District
- SelsovietSelsoviet: Druzhnensky

Population (2010 Census)
  - Total: 526
  - Estimate (2010): 526 (0%)

Administrative status
  - Capital of: Druzhnensky Selsoviet

Municipal status
  - Municipal district: Kurchatovsky Municipal District
  - Rural settlement: Druzhnensky Selsoviet Rural Settlement
  - Capital of: Druzhnensky Selsoviet Rural Settlement
- Time zone: UTC+3 (MSK)
- Postal code: 307220
- Dialing code: +7 47131
- OKTMO ID: 38621410101

Druzhnaya (Russian: Дружная) is a rural locality (a village) and the administrative center of Druzhnensky Selsoviet Rural Settlement, Kurchatovsky District, Kursk Oblast, Russia. Population: 526 (2010 census); 616 (2002 census);

== Geography ==
The village is located on the Reut River, 44 km south-west of Kursk, 7 km south-west of the district center – the town Kurchatov

Climate

Druzhnaya has a warm-summer humid continental climate (Dfb in the Köppen climate classification).

Climate data for Druzhnaya
Month	Jan	Feb	Mar	Apr	May	Jun	Jul	Aug	Sep	Oct	Nov	Dec	Year
Mean daily maximum °C (°F)	−3.9 (25.0)	−2.9 (26.8)	3 (37)	13.2 (55.8)	19.5 (67.1)	22.8 (73.0)	25.3 (77.5)	24.7 (76.5)	18.3 (64.9)	10.7 (51.3)	3.5 (38.3)	−1.1 (30.0)	11.1 (51.9)
Daily mean °C (°F)	−6 (21)	−5.5 (22.1)	−0.6 (30.9)	8.4 (47.1)	14.9 (58.8)	18.5 (65.3)	21 (70)	20.1 (68.2)	14.1 (57.4)	7.4 (45.3)	1.3 (34.3)	−3 (27)	7.6 (45.6)
Mean daily minimum °C (°F)	−8.5 (16.7)	−8.6 (16.5)	−4.7 (23.5)	2.9 (37.2)	9.2 (48.6)	13.1 (55.6)	15.9 (60.6)	15 (59)	9.8 (49.6)	4 (39)	−1 (30)	−5.2 (22.6)	3.5 (38.2)
Average precipitation mm (inches)	51 (2.0)	44 (1.7)	48 (1.9)	50 (2.0)	63 (2.5)	70 (2.8)	74 (2.9)	54 (2.1)	57 (2.2)	57 (2.2)	47 (1.9)	49 (1.9)	664 (26.1)
Source: https://en.climate-data.org/asia/russian-federation/kursk-oblast/дружная-666160/

== Transport ==
Druzhnaya is located 34 km from the federal route M-2 Crimea Highway, 0.5 km from road of regional importance 38K-017 (Kursk – Lgov – Rylsk – border with Ukraine), 0.5 km from 38K-010 (M2 – Ivanino), 18 km from 38K-004 (Dyakonovo – Sudzha – border with Ukraine), 7.5 km from intermunicipal significance 38H-086 (38K-004 – Lyubimovka – Imeni Karla Libknekhta), on the road 38H-090 (38H-086 – Kolpakovo – Ivanino), 3 km from the nearest railway station Lukashevka (railway line Lgov I — Kursk).

The rural locality is situated 51 km from Kursk Vostochny Airport, 128 km from Belgorod International Airport and 253 km from Voronezh Peter the Great Airport.
