= Shatov, Kursk Oblast =

Rural locality in Kursk Oblast, Russia

Shatov Шатов
- Khutor
- Interactive map of Shatov
- Location of Shatov Shatov (Kursk Oblast)
- Coordinates: 51°31′06″N 35°53′28″E
- Country: Russia
- Federal subject: Kursk Oblast
- Administrative district: Oktyabrsky District
- SelsovietSelsoviet: Plotavsky

Population (2010 Census)
  - Total: 7
  - Estimate (2010): 7 (0%)

Municipal status
  - Municipal district: Oktyabrsky Municipal District
  - Rural settlement: Plotavsky Selsoviet Rural Settlement
- Time zone: UTC+3 (MSK)
- Postal code: 307200
- Dialing code: +7 47142
- OKTMO ID: 38628426126
- Website: plotavss.ru

Shatov (Russian: Шатов) is a rural locality (a khutor) in Plotavsky Selsoviet Rural Settlement, Oktyabrsky District, Kursk Oblast, Russia. Population: 7 (2010 census); 18 (2002 census);

== Geography ==
The khutor is located in the Vorobzha River basin (a left tributary of the Seym River), 62 km (39 mi) from the Russia–Ukraine border, 27 km (17 mi) south-west of Kursk, 15 km (9.3 mi) south-west of the district center – the urban-type settlement Pryamitsyno, 2 km (1.2 mi) from the selsoviet center – Plotava.

Climate

Shatov has a warm-summer humid continental climate (Dfb in the Köppen climate classification).

== Transport ==
Shatov is located 10.5 km (6.5 mi) from the federal route M-2 Crimea Highway (a part of the European route E105), 5 km (3.1 mi) from the road of regional importance 38K-004 (Dyakonovo – Sudzha – border with Ukraine), 1 km (0.62 mi) from the road of intermunicipal significance 38H-094 (38K-004 – Plotava), 13.5 km (8.4 mi) from the nearest railway halt 439 km (railway line Lgov I — Kursk).

The rural locality is situated 37 km (23 mi) from Kursk Vostochny Airport, 107 km (66 mi) from Belgorod International Airport and 233 km (145 mi) from Voronezh Peter the Great Airport.
