= Yakovlivka =

Yakovlivka (Ukrainian: Яковлівка) is the name of several small settlements in Ukraine:

- Yakovlivka, Bakhmut Raion, Donetsk Oblast
- Yakovlivka, Donetsk Raion, Donetsk Oblast

== See also ==
- Yakovlevka (disambiguation), settlements in Russia with the equivalent Russian-language name
