= Zhuravlinsky =

Rural locality in Kursk Oblast, Russia

Zhuravlinsky Журавлинский
- Khutor
- Interactive map of Zhuravlinsky
- Location of Zhuravlinsky Zhuravlinsky (Kursk Oblast)
- Coordinates: 51°34′16″N 35°56′13″E
- Country: Russia
- Federal subject: Kursk Oblast
- Administrative district: Oktyabrsky District
- SelsovietSelsoviet: Lobazovsky

Population (2010 Census)
  - Total: 41
  - Estimate (2010): 41 (0%)

Municipal status
  - Municipal district: Oktyabrsky Municipal District
  - Rural settlement: Lobazovsky Selsoviet Rural Settlement
- Time zone: UTC+3 (MSK)
- Postal code: 307205
- Dialing code: +7 47142
- OKTMO ID: 38628420116
- Website: lobazovka.ru

Zhuravlinsky (Russian: Журавлинский) is a rural locality (a khutor) in Lobazovsky Selsoviet Rural Settlement, Oktyabrsky District, Kursk Oblast, Russia. Population: 41 (2010 census); 43 (2002 census);

== Geography ==
The khutor is located on the Vorobzha River (a left tributary of the Seym River), 67 km from the Russia–Ukraine border, 21 km south-west of Kursk, 9 km south of the district center – the urban-type settlement Pryamitsyno, 0.5 km from the selsoviet center – Zhuravlino.

Climate

Zhuravlinsky has a warm-summer humid continental climate (Dfb in the Köppen climate classification).

== Transport ==
Zhuravlinsky is located 9 km from the federal route M-2 Crimea Highway (a part of the European route E105), on the road of regional importance 38K-010 ("Crimea Highway" – Ivanino, part of the European route E38), 1 km from the road of intermunicipal significance 38H-072 (a part of a selo Dyakonovo: 4th Okolotok – Zhuravlinsky, Zhuravlino – Asphalt plant of Oktyabrsky District), 9 km from the nearest railway station Dyakonovo (railway line Lgov I — Kursk).

The rural locality is situated 31 km from Kursk Vostochny Airport, 111 km from Belgorod International Airport and 229 km from Voronezh Peter the Great Airport.
