= Pokrovskoye, Republic of Dagestan =

Pokrovskoye Покровское Шовде
- Selo
- Location within Republic of Dagestan Location within Russia
- Coordinates: 43°17′N 46°39′E
- Country: Russia
- Region: Republic of Dagestan
- District: Khasavyurtovsky District
- Time zone: UTC+3:00

Pokrovskoye (Russian: Покровское; Chechen: Шовде, Şovde) is a rural locality (a selo) and the administrative center of Pokrovsky Selsoviet, Khasavyurtovsky District, Republic of Dagestan, Russia. Population: 5,053 (2021 census); 3,575 (2002 census); 2,055 (1989 Soviet census). There are 61 streets.

== Population ==
National composition (2002)[10]: Chechens — 3488 people. (97.6%), Russians — 28 people. (0.8%), Lezgins — 24 people. (0.5%), Kumyki — 18 people. (0.5%), Avars — 15 people. (0.4%), other — 2 people. (0.1%).

== Education ==
Pokrovskaya Municipal Secondary Comprehensive School[11]

== History ==
The village was founded in 1907 by settlers from Belarus. The settlement of Khamzaevsky was founded on the lands of Prince Khamzayev. It was later renamed Pokrovsky in honor of the Feast of the Intercession of the Holy Virgin. After the Chechens returned from exile, they were resettled in this village. Currently, they constitute the absolute majority here.

== Geography ==
Pokrovskoye is situated 12 km northeast of Khasavyurt (the district's administrative centre) by road. Batayurt is the nearest rural locality.

Located 7 km northeast of the city of Khasavyurt.

Nearest settlements: to the northeast are the villages of Batayurt and Bayramaul; to the northwest are the villages of Simsir, Kandauraul, and Bammatyurt; to the southwest is the village of Mogilevskoye; and to the southeast is the village of Mutsalaul.
