= Pokrovskoye, Cherepovetsky District, Vologda Oblast =

Pokrovskoye Покровское
- Village
- Location within Vologda Oblast Location within Russia
- Coordinates: 58°58′N 38°23′E
- Country: Russia
- Region: Vologda Oblast
- District: Cherepovetsky District
- Time zone: UTC+3:00

Pokrovskoye (Russian: Покровское) is a rural locality (a village) in Yugskoye Rural Settlement, Cherepovetsky District, Vologda Oblast, Russia. The population was 42 as of 2002.

== Geography ==
Pokrovskoye is located 43 km (27 mi) southeast of Cherepovets (the district's administrative centre) by road. Shelkovo is the nearest rural locality.
