= Novosergeyevka, Seryshevsky District, Amur Oblast =

Novosergeyevka Новосергеевка
- Selo
- Location within Amur Oblast Location within Russia
- Coordinates: 50°54′N 128°47′E
- Country: Russia
- Region: Amur Oblast
- District: Seryshevsky District
- Time zone: UTC+9:00

Novosergeyevka (Russian: Новосергеевка) is a rural locality (a selo) and the administrative center of Novosergeyevsky Selsoviet of Seryshevsky District, Amur Oblast, Russia. The population was 462 as of 2018. There are 6 streets.

== Geography ==
Novosergeyevka is located on the Tom River, 42 km southeast of Seryshevo (the district's administrative centre) by road. Parunovka is the nearest rural locality.
