= Batayurt =

Batayurt Батаюрт Ботаюрт
- Selo
- Location within Republic of Dagestan Location within Russia
- Coordinates: 43°18′N 46°40′E
- Country: Russia
- Region: Republic of Dagestan
- District: Khasavyurtovsky District
- Time zone: UTC+3:00

Batayurt (Russian: Батаюрт; Kumyk: Ботаюрт, Botayurt) is a rural locality (a selo) and the administrative centre of Batayurtovsky Selsoviet, Khasavyurtovsky District, Republic of Dagestan, Russia. 6,484 (2021 census); 3,823 (2002 census); 1,867 (1989 Soviet census). There are 75 streets.

== Geography ==
Batayurt is located 15 km northeast of Khasavyurt (the district's administrative centre) by road. Umashaul is the nearest rural locality.
