= Lyubitskoye, Medvensky District, Kursk Oblast =

Rural locality in Kursk Oblast, Russia

Lyubitskoye Любицкое
- Selo
- Interactive map of Lyubitskoye
- Location of Lyubitskoye Lyubitskoye (Kursk Oblast)
- Coordinates: 51°31′58″N 36°24′39″E
- Country: Russia
- Federal subject: Kursk Oblast
- Administrative district: Medvensky District
- SelsovietSelsoviet: Kitayevsky

Population (2010 Census)
  - Total: 324
  - Estimate (2010): 324 (0%)

Municipal status
  - Municipal district: Medvensky Municipal District
  - Rural settlement: Kitayevsky Selsoviet Rural Settlement
- Time zone: UTC+3 (MSK)
- Postal code: 307051
- Dialing code: +7 47146
- OKTMO ID: 38624424106
- Website: kitayss.rkursk.ru

Lyubitskoye (Russian: Любицкое) is a rural locality (Russian: село, lit. 'village') in Kitayevsky Selsoviet Rural Settlement, Medvensky District, Kursk Oblast, Russia. Population: 324 (2010 census); 353 (2002 census);

== Geography ==
The village is located on the Polnaya River (a left tributary of the Seym), 89 km (55 mi) from the Russia–Ukraine border, 25 km (16 mi) south-east of Kursk, 22 km (14 mi) north-east of the district center – the urban-type settlement Medvenka, 6 km (3.7 mi) from the selsoviet center – 2nd Kitayevka.

Climate

Lyubitskoye has a warm-summer humid continental climate (Dfb in the Köppen climate classification).

Climate data for Lyubitskoye
Month	Jan	Feb	Mar	Apr	May	Jun	Jul	Aug	Sep	Oct	Nov	Dec	Year
Mean daily maximum °C (°F)	−4.1 (24.6)	−3.1 (26.4)	2.8 (37.0)	13 (55)	19.4 (66.9)	22.7 (72.9)	25.4 (77.7)	24.7 (76.5)	18.2 (64.8)	10.6 (51.1)	3.3 (37.9)	−1.2 (29.8)	11.0 (51.7)
Daily mean °C (°F)	−6.2 (20.8)	−5.7 (21.7)	−0.8 (30.6)	8.2 (46.8)	14.7 (58.5)	18.3 (64.9)	20.9 (69.6)	20 (68)	14 (57)	7.2 (45.0)	1.1 (34.0)	−3.2 (26.2)	7.4 (45.3)
Mean daily minimum °C (°F)	−8.8 (16.2)	−8.9 (16.0)	−5 (23)	2.6 (36.7)	9 (48)	12.9 (55.2)	15.8 (60.4)	14.8 (58.6)	9.6 (49.3)	3.9 (39.0)	−1.2 (29.8)	−5.4 (22.3)	3.3 (37.9)
Average precipitation mm (inches)	50 (2.0)	43 (1.7)	46 (1.8)	48 (1.9)	60 (2.4)	68 (2.7)	71 (2.8)	52 (2.0)	57 (2.2)	57 (2.2)	45 (1.8)	49 (1.9)	646 (25.4)
Source: https://en.climate-data.org/asia/russian-federation/kursk-oblast/любицкое-656079/

== Transport ==
Lyubitskoye is located 21 km (13 mi) from the federal route M-2 Crimea Highway (a part of the European route E105), 2 km (1.2 mi) from the road of intermunicipal significance 38H-236 (M2 "Crimea Highway" – Polevaya), on the road 38H-237 (M2 "Crimea Highway" – Polny – 38N-236), 9 km (5.6 mi) from the nearest railway station Polevaya (railway line Klyukva — Belgorod).

The rural locality is situated 25 km (16 mi) from Kursk Vostochny Airport, 99 km (62 mi) from Belgorod International Airport and 196 km (122 mi) from Voronezh Peter the Great Airport.
