= Novosergeyevka, Arkharinsky District, Amur Oblast =

Novosergeyevka Новосергеевка
- Selo
- Location within Amur Oblast Location within Russia
- Coordinates: 49°14′19″N 130°17′38″E
- Country: Russia
- Region: Amur Oblast
- District: Arkharinsky District
- Time zone: UTC+09:00

Novosergeyevka (Russian: Новосергеевка) is a rural locality (a selo) and the administrative center of Novosergeyevsky Selsoviet of Arkharinsky District, Amur Oblast, Russia. The population was 83 as of 2019. There are 3 streets.

== Geography ==
Novosergeyevka is located 34 km southeast of Arkhara (the district's administrative centre) by road. Boguchan is the nearest rural locality.

== Demography ==
Historical population
Year	Pop.	±%
2002	142	—
2010	102	−28.2%
2012	102	+0.0%
2013	101	−1.0%
2014	97	−4.0%
2015	95	−2.1%
2016	92	−3.2%
2017	90	−2.2%
2018	84	−6.7%
2019	83	−1.2%
Source: Оценка численности населения по городским округам, муниципальным районам, городским и сельским поселениям Амурской области
