= Yakovlevka, Karmaskalinsky District, Republic of Bashkortostan =

Yakovlevka Яковлевка
- Village
- Location within Bashkortostan Location within Russia
- Coordinates: 54°17′N 55°32′E
- Country: Russia
- Region: Bashkortostan
- District: Karmaskalinsky District
- Time zone: UTC+5:00

Yakovlevka (Russian: Яковлевка) is a rural locality (a village) in Adzitarovsky Selsoviet, Karmaskalinsky District, Bashkortostan, Russia. The population was 3 as of 2010. There is 1 street.

== Geography ==
Yakovlevka is located 55 km southwest of Karmaskaly (the district's administrative centre) by road. Chishma is the nearest rural locality.
