= Pokrovskaya, Vologda Oblast =

Pokrovskaya Покровская
- Village
- Location within Vologda Oblast Location within Russia
- Coordinates: 60°21′N 39°11′E
- Country: Russia
- Region: Vologda Oblast
- District: Vozhegodsky District
- Time zone: UTC+3:00

Pokrovskaya (Russian: Покровская) is a rural locality (a village) in Beketovskoye Rural Settlement, Vozhegodsky District, Vologda Oblast, Russia. The population was 39 as of 2002.

== Geography ==
Pokrovskaya is located 77 km southwest of Vozhega (the district's administrative centre) by road. Kuritsino is the nearest rural locality.
