= Pokrovskoye, Republic of Bashkortostan =

Pokrovskoye Покровское
- Village
- Location within Bashkortostan Location within Russia
- Coordinates: 55°06′N 56°17′E
- Country: Russia
- Region: Bashkortostan
- District: Blagoveshchensky District
- Time zone: UTC+5:00

Pokrovskoye (Russian: Покровское) is a rural locality (a village) in Ilyino-Polyansky Selsoviet, Blagoveshchensky District, Bashkortostan, Russia. The population was 1 as of 2010. There is 1 street.

== Geography ==
Pokrovskoye is located 28 km northeast of Blagoveshchensk (the district's administrative centre) by road. Voskresenka is the nearest rural locality.
