= Pokrovskoye, Chagodoshchensky District, Vologda Oblast =

Pokrovskoye Покровское
- Selo
- Location within Vologda Oblast Location within Russia
- Coordinates: 58°57′N 35°34′E
- Country: Russia
- Region: Vologda Oblast
- District: Chagodoshchensky District
- Time zone: UTC+3:00

Pokrovskoye (Russian: Покровское) is a rural locality (a selo) in Pokrovskoye Rural Settlement, Chagodoshchensky District, Vologda Oblast, Russia. The population was 415 as of 2002. There are 8 streets.

== Geography ==
Pokrovskoye is located 37 km (23 mi) southeast of Chagoda (the district's administrative centre) by road. Gora is the nearest rural locality.
