= Pokrovskoye, Vozhegodsky District, Vologda Oblast =

Pokrovskoye Покровское
- Selo
- Location within Vologda Oblast Location within Russia
- Coordinates: 60°35′N 40°10′E
- Country: Russia
- Region: Vologda Oblast
- District: Vozhegodsky District
- Time zone: UTC+3:00

Pokrovskoye (Russian: Покровское) is a rural locality (a selo) in Yavengskoye Rural Settlement, Vozhegodsky District, Vologda Oblast, Russia. The population was 102 as of 2002.

== Geography ==
Pokrovskoye is located 18 km north of Vozhega (the district's administrative centre) by road. Baza is the nearest rural locality.
