= Pokrovskoye, Ivanovo Oblast =

Pokrovskoye Покровское
- Village
- Location within Ivanovo Oblast Location within Russia
- Coordinates: 56°36′N 41°21′E
- Country: Russia
- Region: Ivanovo Oblast
- District: Savinsky District
- Time zone: UTC+3:00

Pokrovskoye (Russian: Покровское) is a rural locality (a village) in Savinsky District, Ivanovo Oblast, Russia. Population: 296 (2010 census);

== Geography ==
This rural locality is located 9 kilometres (5.6 mi) from Savino (the district's administrative centre), 50 kilometres (31 mi) from Ivanovo (capital of Ivanovo Oblast) and 248 kilometres (154 mi) from Moscow. Kurmysh is the nearest rural locality.
