= Pokrovskoye, Vashkinsky District, Vologda Oblast =

Pokrovskoye Покровское
- Village
- Location within Vologda Oblast Location within Russia
- Coordinates: 60°26′N 37°17′E
- Country: Russia
- Region: Vologda Oblast
- District: Vashkinsky District
- Time zone: UTC+3:00

Pokrovskoye (Russian: Покровское) is a rural locality (a village) in Kisnemskoye Rural Settlement, Vashkinsky District, Vologda Oblast, Russia. The population was 211 as of 2002. There are 5 streets.

== Geography ==
Pokrovskoye is located on the Kema River, 71 km northwest of Lipin Bor (the district's administrative centre) by road. Dryabloye is the nearest rural locality.
