= Lebedin, Kursk Oblast =

Rural locality in Kursk Oblast, Russia

Lebedin Лебедин
- Khutor
- Interactive map of Lebedin
- Location of Lebedin Lebedin (Kursk Oblast)
- Coordinates: 51°32′27″N 35°57′47″E
- Country: Russia
- Federal subject: Kursk Oblast
- Administrative district: Oktyabrsky District
- SelsovietSelsoviet: Lobazovsky

Population (2010 Census)
  - Total: 74
  - Estimate (2010): 74 (0%)

Municipal status
  - Municipal district: Oktyabrsky Municipal District
  - Rural settlement: Lobazovsky Selsoviet Rural Settlement
- Time zone: UTC+3 (MSK)
- Postal code: 307205
- Dialing code: +7 47142
- OKTMO ID: 38628420121
- Website: lobazovka.ru

Lebedin (Russian: Лебедин) is a rural locality (a khutor) in Lobazovsky Selsoviet Rural Settlement, Oktyabrsky District, Kursk Oblast, Russia. Population: 74 (2010 census); 90 (2002 census);

== Geography ==
The khutor is located 67 km from the Russia–Ukraine border, 22 km south-west of Kursk, 11 km south of the district center – the urban-type settlement Pryamitsyno, 2.5 km from the selsoviet center – Zhuravlino.

Climate

Lebedin has a warm-summer humid continental climate (Dfb in the Köppen climate classification).

== Transport ==
Lebedin is located 6 km from the federal route M-2 Crimea Highway (a part of the European route E105), 3 km from the road of regional importance 38K-010 ("Crimea Highway" – Ivanino, part of the European route E38), on the road of intermunicipal significance 38H-215 (38K-010 – Lebedin), 12 km from the nearest railway station Dyakonovo (railway line Lgov I — Kursk).

The rural locality is situated 32 km from Kursk Vostochny Airport, 107 km from Belgorod International Airport and 228 km from Voronezh Peter the Great Airport.
