= Plotava, Kursk Oblast =

Rural locality in Kursk Oblast, Russia

Plotava Плотава
- Village
- Interactive map of Plotava
- Location of Plotava Plotava (Kursk Oblast)
- Coordinates: 51°32′07″N 35°55′05″E
- Country: Russia
- Federal subject: Kursk Oblast
- Administrative district: Oktyabrsky District
- SelsovietSelsoviet: Plotavsky

Population (2010 Census)
  - Total: 249
  - Estimate (2010): 249 (0%)

Administrative status
  - Capital of: Plotavsky Selsoviet

Municipal status
  - Municipal district: Oktyabrsky Municipal District
  - Rural settlement: Plotavsky Selsoviet Rural Settlement
  - Capital of: Plotavsky Selsoviet Rural Settlement
- Time zone: UTC+3 (MSK)
- Postal code: 307206
- Dialing code: +7 47142
- OKTMO ID: 38628426101
- Website: plotavss.ru

Plotava (Russian: Плотава) is a rural locality (Russian: деревня, lit. 'village') and the administrative center of Plotavsky Selsoviet Rural Settlement, Oktyabrsky District, Kursk Oblast, Russia. Population: 249 (2010 census); 283 (2002 census);

== Geography ==
The village is located on the Vorobzha River (a left tributary of the Seym River), 64 km from the Russia–Ukraine border, 25 km south-west of Kursk, 13 km south of the district center – the urban-type settlement Pryamitsyno.

Climate

Plotava has a warm-summer humid continental climate (Dfb in the Köppen climate classification).

Climate data for Plotava
Month	Jan	Feb	Mar	Apr	May	Jun	Jul	Aug	Sep	Oct	Nov	Dec	Year
Mean daily maximum °C (°F)	−4 (25)	−3 (27)	3 (37)	13.1 (55.6)	19.4 (66.9)	22.7 (72.9)	25.3 (77.5)	24.6 (76.3)	18.2 (64.8)	10.6 (51.1)	3.4 (38.1)	−1.1 (30.0)	11.0 (51.9)
Daily mean °C (°F)	−6.1 (21.0)	−5.5 (22.1)	−0.6 (30.9)	8.3 (46.9)	14.8 (58.6)	18.4 (65.1)	20.9 (69.6)	20.1 (68.2)	14 (57)	7.3 (45.1)	1.2 (34.2)	−3.1 (26.4)	7.5 (45.4)
Mean daily minimum °C (°F)	−8.6 (16.5)	−8.6 (16.5)	−4.7 (23.5)	2.8 (37.0)	9.2 (48.6)	13.1 (55.6)	15.9 (60.6)	14.9 (58.8)	9.8 (49.6)	4 (39)	−1.1 (30.0)	−5.3 (22.5)	3.5 (38.2)
Average precipitation mm (inches)	51 (2.0)	44 (1.7)	47 (1.9)	49 (1.9)	62 (2.4)	69 (2.7)	73 (2.9)	55 (2.2)	57 (2.2)	57 (2.2)	46 (1.8)	49 (1.9)	659 (25.8)
Source: https://en.climate-data.org/asia/russian-federation/kursk-oblast/плотава-682143/

== Transport ==
Plotava is located 9.5 km from the federal route M-2 Crimea Highway (a part of the European route E105), 3.5 km from the road of regional importance 38K-010 ("Crimea Highway" – Ivanino, part of the European route E38), 6 km from the road 38K-004 (Dyakonovo – Sudzha – border with Ukraine), on the road of intermunicipal significance 38H-094 (38K-004 – Plotava), 12 km from the nearest railway halt 439 km (railway line Lgov I — Kursk).

The rural locality is situated 35 km from Kursk Vostochny Airport, 108 km from Belgorod International Airport and 231 km from Voronezh Peter the Great Airport.
