= Zhuravlino =

Rural locality in Kursk Oblast, Russia

Zhuravlino Журавлино
- Selo
- Interactive map of Zhuravlino
- Location of Zhuravlino Zhuravlino (Kursk Oblast)
- Coordinates: 51°33′56″N 35°56′47″E
- Country: Russia
- Federal subject: Kursk Oblast
- Administrative district: Oktyabrsky District
- SelsovietSelsoviet: Lobazovsky

Population (2010 Census)
  - Total: 223
  - Estimate (2010): 223 (0%)

Administrative status
  - Capital of: Lobazovsky Selsoviet

Municipal status
  - Municipal district: Oktyabrsky Municipal District
  - Rural settlement: Lobazovsky Selsoviet Rural Settlement
  - Capital of: Lobazovsky Selsoviet Rural Settlement
- Time zone: UTC+3 (MSK)
- Postal code: 307205
- Dialing code: +7 47142
- OKTMO ID: 38628420101
- Website: lobazovka.ru

Zhuravlino (Russian: Журавлино) is a rural locality (Russian: село, lit. 'village') and the administrative center of Lobazovsky Selsoviet Rural Settlement, Oktyabrsky District, Kursk Oblast, Russia. Population: 223 (2010 census); 219 (2002 census);

== Geography ==
The village is located on the Vorobzha River (a left tributary of the Seym River), 68 km from the Russia–Ukraine border, 20 km south-west of Kursk, 9.5 km south of the district center – the urban-type settlement Pryamitsyno.

Climate

Zhuravlino has a warm-summer humid continental climate (Dfb in the Köppen climate classification).

== Transport ==
Zhuravlino is located 7 km from the federal route M-2 Crimea Highway (a part of the European route E105), 0.2 km from the road of regional importance 38K-010 ("Crimea Highway" – Ivanino, part of the European route E38), on the roads of intermunicipal significance 38H-072 (a part of a selo Dyakonovo: 4th Okolotok – Zhuravlinsky, Zhuravlino – Asphalt plant of Oktyabrsky District) and 38H-215 (38K-010 – Lebedin), 9.5 km from the nearest railway station Dyakonovo (railway line Lgov I — Kursk).

The rural locality is situated 30 km from Kursk Vostochny Airport, 110 km from Belgorod International Airport and 229 km from Voronezh Peter the Great Airport.
