= Novosergeyevka, Kursk Oblast, OKTMO 38621418101 =

Rural locality in Kursk Oblast, Russia

Novosergeyevka Новосергеевка
- Village
- Interactive map of Novosergeyevka
- Location of Novosergeyevka Novosergeyevka (Kursk Oblast)
- Coordinates: 51°30′06″N 35°32′01″E
- Country: Russia
- Federal subject: Kursk Oblast
- Administrative district: Kurchatovsky District
- SelsovietSelsoviet: Kolpakovsky

Population (2010 Census)
  - Total: 263
  - Estimate (2010): 263 (0%)

Administrative status
  - Capital of: Kolpakovsky Selsoviet

Municipal status
  - Municipal district: Kurchatovsky Municipal District
  - Rural settlement: Kolpakovsky Selsoviet Rural Settlement
  - Capital of: Kolpakovsky Selsoviet Rural Settlement
- Time zone: UTC+3 (MSK)
- Postal code: 307231
- Dialing code: +7 47131
- OKTMO ID: 38621418101

Novosergeyevka (Russian: Новосергеевка) is a rural locality (a village) and the administrative center of Kolpakovsky Selsoviet Rural Settlement, Kurchatovsky District, Kursk Oblast, Russia. Population: 263 (2010 census); 368 (2002 census);

== Geography ==
The village is located on the Ralutin River, 52 km south-west of Kursk, 19.5 km south-west of the district center – the town Kurchatov.

Climate

Novosergeyevka has a warm-summer humid continental climate (Dfb in the Köppen climate classification).

Climate data for Novosergeyevka
Month	Jan	Feb	Mar	Apr	May	Jun	Jul	Aug	Sep	Oct	Nov	Dec	Year
Mean daily maximum °C (°F)	−3.9 (25.0)	−2.8 (27.0)	3.1 (37.6)	13.2 (55.8)	19.4 (66.9)	22.7 (72.9)	25.3 (77.5)	24.6 (76.3)	18.3 (64.9)	10.7 (51.3)	3.6 (38.5)	−1 (30)	11.1 (52.0)
Daily mean °C (°F)	−5.9 (21.4)	−5.4 (22.3)	−0.5 (31.1)	8.4 (47.1)	14.8 (58.6)	18.4 (65.1)	20.9 (69.6)	20 (68)	14.1 (57.4)	7.4 (45.3)	1.4 (34.5)	−2.9 (26.8)	7.6 (45.6)
Mean daily minimum °C (°F)	−8.4 (16.9)	−8.5 (16.7)	−4.6 (23.7)	2.8 (37.0)	9.2 (48.6)	13.1 (55.6)	15.9 (60.6)	14.9 (58.8)	9.8 (49.6)	4 (39)	−1 (30)	−5.1 (22.8)	3.5 (38.3)
Average precipitation mm (inches)	51 (2.0)	44 (1.7)	48 (1.9)	50 (2.0)	63 (2.5)	70 (2.8)	74 (2.9)	54 (2.1)	57 (2.2)	57 (2.2)	47 (1.9)	49 (1.9)	664 (26.1)
Source: https://en.climate-data.org/asia/russian-federation/kursk-oblast/новосергеевка-666504/

== Transport ==
Novosergeyevka is located 35.5 km from the federal route M-2 Crimea Highway, 13 km from road of regional importance 38K-017 (Kursk – Lgov – Rylsk – border with Ukraine), 13 km from 38K-010 (M2 – Ivanino), 8.5 km from 38K-004 (Dyakonovo – Sudzha – border with Ukraine), on the road of intermunicipal significance 38H-086 (38K-004 – Lyubimovka – Imeni Karla Libknekhta), 0.5 km from 38H-090 (38H-086 – Kolpakovo – Ivanino), 13.5 km from the nearest railway halt 412 km (railway line Lgov I — Kursk).

The rural locality is situated 59 km from Kursk Vostochny Airport, 119 km from Belgorod International Airport and 258 km from Voronezh Peter the Great Airport.
