= Artyukhovka, Kursk Oblast =

Rural locality in Kursk Oblast, Russia

Artyukhovka Артюховка
- Village
- Interactive map of Artyukhovka
- Location of Artyukhovka Artyukhovka (Kursk Oblast)
- Coordinates: 51°34′05″N 35°45′34″E
- Country: Russia
- Federal subject: Kursk Oblast
- Administrative district: Oktyabrsky District
- SelsovietSelsoviet: Artyukhovsky

Population (2010 Census)
  - Total: 267
  - Estimate (2010): 267 (0%)

Administrative status
  - Capital of: Artyukhovsky Selsoviet

Municipal status
  - Municipal district: Oktyabrsky Municipal District
  - Rural settlement: Artyukhovsky Selsoviet Rural Settlement
  - Capital of: Artyukhovsky Selsoviet Rural Settlement
- Time zone: UTC+3 (MSK)
- Postal code: 307203
- Dialing code: +7 47142
- OKTMO ID: 38628404101
- Website: www.artuhovskiy.ru

Artyukhovka (Russian: Артюховка) is a rural locality (Russian: деревня, lit. 'village') and the administrative center of Artyukhovsky Selsoviet Rural Settlement, Oktyabrsky District, Kursk Oblast, Russia. Population: 267 (2010 census); 308 (2002 census);

== Geography ==
The village is located on the Dichnya River (a left tributary of the Seym River), 57 km from the Russia–Ukraine border, 31 km south-west of Kursk, 14 km south-west of the district center – the urban-type settlement Pryamitsyno.

Climate

Artyukhovka has a warm-summer humid continental climate (Dfb in the Köppen climate classification).

Climate data for Artyukhovka
Month	Jan	Feb	Mar	Apr	May	Jun	Jul	Aug	Sep	Oct	Nov	Dec	Year
Mean daily maximum °C (°F)	−4 (25)	−3 (27)	2.9 (37.2)	13.1 (55.6)	19.5 (67.1)	22.7 (72.9)	25.3 (77.5)	24.7 (76.5)	18.2 (64.8)	10.6 (51.1)	3.4 (38.1)	−1.1 (30.0)	11.0 (51.9)
Daily mean °C (°F)	−6.1 (21.0)	−5.6 (21.9)	−0.7 (30.7)	8.3 (46.9)	14.8 (58.6)	18.4 (65.1)	21 (70)	20.1 (68.2)	14.1 (57.4)	7.3 (45.1)	1.2 (34.2)	−3.1 (26.4)	7.5 (45.5)
Mean daily minimum °C (°F)	−8.6 (16.5)	−8.7 (16.3)	−4.8 (23.4)	2.8 (37.0)	9.2 (48.6)	13.1 (55.6)	15.9 (60.6)	15 (59)	9.8 (49.6)	4 (39)	−1.1 (30.0)	−5.3 (22.5)	3.4 (38.2)
Average precipitation mm (inches)	52 (2.0)	44 (1.7)	48 (1.9)	50 (2.0)	64 (2.5)	71 (2.8)	75 (3.0)	56 (2.2)	58 (2.3)	58 (2.3)	47 (1.9)	49 (1.9)	672 (26.5)
Source: https://en.climate-data.org/asia/russian-federation/kursk-oblast/артюховка-321156/

== Transport ==
Artyukhovka is located 21 km from the federal route M-2 Crimea Highway (a part of the European route E105), on the road of regional importance 38K-010 ("Crimea Highway" – Ivanino, part of the European route E38) and on the road of intermunicipal significance 38H-213 (38K-010 – Artyukhovka), 9.5 km from the nearest railway halt 433 km (railway line Lgov I — Kursk).

The rural locality is situated 42 km from Kursk Vostochny Airport, 116 km from Belgorod International Airport and 241 km from Voronezh Peter the Great Airport.
