= Kolpakovo, Kursk Oblast =

Rural locality in Kursk Oblast, Russia

Kolpakovo Колпаково
- Selo
- Interactive map of Kolpakovo
- Location of Kolpakovo Kolpakovo (Kursk Oblast)
- Coordinates: 51°32′51″N 35°35′44″E
- Country: Russia
- Federal subject: Kursk Oblast
- Administrative district: Kurchatovsky District
- SelsovietSelsoviet: Kolpakovsky

Population (2010 Census)
  - Total: 92
  - Estimate (2010): 92 (0%)

Municipal status
  - Municipal district: Kurchatovsky Municipal District
  - Rural settlement: Kolpakovsky Selsoviet Rural Settlement
- Time zone: UTC+3 (MSK)
- Postal code: 307232
- Dialing code: +7 47131
- OKTMO ID: 38621418116

Kolpakovo (Russian: Колпаково) is a rural locality (Russian: село, lit. 'village') in Kolpakovsky Selsoviet Rural Settlement, Kurchatovsky District, Kursk Oblast, Russia. Population: 92 (2010 census); 118 (2002 census);

== Geography ==
The village is located on the Reut River, 46 km south-west of Kursk, 14 km south-west of the district center – the town Kurchatov, 7 km from the selsoviet center – Novosergeyevka.

Climate

Kolpakovo has a warm-summer humid continental climate (Dfb in the Köppen climate classification).

Climate data for Kolpakovo
Month	Jan	Feb	Mar	Apr	May	Jun	Jul	Aug	Sep	Oct	Nov	Dec	Year
Mean daily maximum °C (°F)	−3.9 (25.0)	−2.8 (27.0)	3.1 (37.6)	13.2 (55.8)	19.5 (67.1)	22.8 (73.0)	25.3 (77.5)	24.7 (76.5)	18.3 (64.9)	10.7 (51.3)	3.6 (38.5)	−1 (30)	11.1 (52.0)
Daily mean °C (°F)	−6 (21)	−5.4 (22.3)	−0.5 (31.1)	8.4 (47.1)	14.8 (58.6)	18.4 (65.1)	21 (70)	20.1 (68.2)	14.1 (57.4)	7.4 (45.3)	1.3 (34.3)	−3 (27)	7.6 (45.6)
Mean daily minimum °C (°F)	−8.4 (16.9)	−8.5 (16.7)	−4.6 (23.7)	2.9 (37.2)	9.2 (48.6)	13.1 (55.6)	15.9 (60.6)	15 (59)	9.8 (49.6)	4 (39)	−1 (30)	−5.2 (22.6)	3.5 (38.3)
Average precipitation mm (inches)	51 (2.0)	44 (1.7)	48 (1.9)	50 (2.0)	63 (2.5)	70 (2.8)	74 (2.9)	54 (2.1)	57 (2.2)	57 (2.2)	47 (1.9)	49 (1.9)	664 (26.1)
Source: https://en.climate-data.org/asia/russian-federation/kursk-oblast/kolpakovo-654476/

== Transport ==
Kolpakovo is located 31 km from the federal route M-2 Crimea Highway, 10 km from road of regional importance 38K-017 (Kursk – Lgov – Rylsk – border with Ukraine), 7 km from 38K-010 (M2 – Ivanino), 10.5 km from 38K-004 (Dyakonovo – Sudzha – border with Ukraine), 4.5 km from intermunicipal significance 38H-086 (38K-004 – Lyubimovka – Imeni Karla Libknekhta), on the road 38H-090 (38H-086 – Kolpakovo – Ivanino), 11.5 km from the nearest railway station Blokhino (railway line Lgov I — Kursk).

The rural locality is situated 53 km from Kursk Vostochny Airport, 121 km from Belgorod International Airport and 253 km from Voronezh Peter the Great Airport.
