= Imeni Karla Libknekhta =

Coordinates: 51°37′20″N 35°28′50″E

Imeni Karla Libknekhta (Russian: имени Карла Либкнехта) is an urban locality (a work settlement) in Kurchatovsky District of Kursk Oblast, Russia, located on the left bank of the Seym River. Population: 7,969 (2021 census); 7,682 (2010 census); 8,216 (2002 census); 9,833 (1989 Soviet census).

== History ==
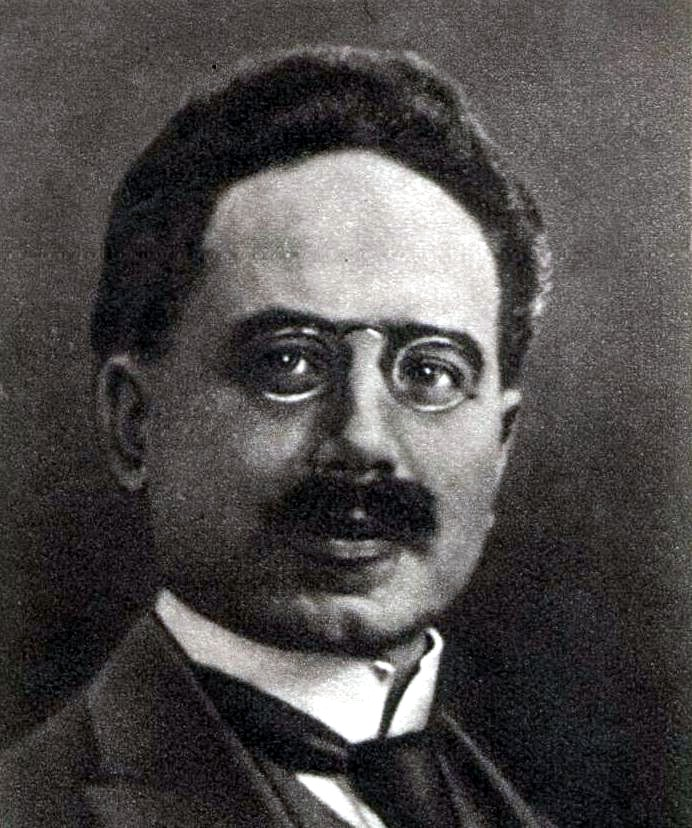
Karl Liebknecht, after whom the settlement is named

The village of Peny (Пены) was settled four hundred years ago on the banks of the Penk River. In 1930, it was granted urban-type settlement status and named after Karl Liebknecht, a German Communist.

== Economy ==
There is a sugar mill, a machine-building factory, a railway station and an important railway line linking Kursk with Ukraine.
