= Ivanino =

Ivanino Иванино
- Urban-type settlement
- Interactive map of Ivanino
- Location of Ivanino Ivanino (Kursk Oblast)
- Coordinates: 51.6461°N 35.5844°E
- Country: Russia
- Federal subject: Kursk Oblast
- Administrative district: Kurchatovsky District

Population (2010 Census)
  - Total: 2,427
  - Estimate (2025): 2,160 (−11%)
- Time zone: UTC+3 (MSK)
- Postal code: 307220
- OKTMO ID: 38621152051

Ivanino (Russian: Иванино) is an urban locality (an urban-type settlement) in Kurchatovsky District of Kursk Oblast, Russia. Population: 2,268 (2021 census); 2,427 (2010 census); 2,387 (2002 census); 2,792 (1989 Soviet census).
