= Ovsyannikovo =

Ovsyannikovo (Russian: Овсянниково) may refer to several rural localities in Russia:

- Ovsyannikovo, Kursky District, Kursk Oblast, village in Pashkovsky Selsoviet Rural Settlement, Kursky District, Kursk Oblast
- Ovsyannikovo, Kovrovsky District, Vladimir Oblast, village in Klyazminskoye Rural Settlement, Kovrovsky District, Vladimir Oblast
- Ovsyannikovo, Sudogodsky District, Vladimir Oblast, village in Golovinskoye Rural Settlement, Sudogodsky District, Vladimir Oblast
- Ovsyannikovo, Babayevsky District, Vologda Oblast, village in Babayevsky District, Vologda Oblast
- Ovsyannikovo, Kichmengsko-Gorodetsky District, Vologda Oblast, village in Gorodetskoye Rural Settlement, Kichmengsko-Gorodetsky District, Vologda Oblast
- Ovsyannikovo, Sokolsky District, Vologda Oblast, village in Chuchkovskoye Rural Settlement, Sokolsky District, Vologda Oblast
- Ovsyannikovo, Vologodsky District, Vologda Oblast, village in Novlenskoye Rural Settlement, Vologodsky District, Vologda Oblast
