= Semyonovka, Shchetinsky selsoviet, Kursky District, Kursk Oblast =

Rural locality in Kursk Oblast, Russia

Semyonovka Семёновка
- Village
- Interactive map of Semyonovka
- Location of Semyonovka Semyonovka (Kursk Oblast)
- Coordinates: 51°49′25″N 36°19′29″E
- Country: Russia
- Federal subject: Kursk Oblast
- Administrative district: Kursky District
- SelsovietSelsoviet: Shchetinsky

Population (2010 Census)
  - Total: 42
  - Estimate (2010): 42 (0%)

Municipal status
  - Municipal district: Kursky Municipal District
  - Rural settlement: Shchetinsky Selsoviet Rural Settlement
- Time zone: UTC+3 (MSK)
- Postal code: 305511
- Dialing code: +7 4712
- OKTMO ID: 38620492126
- Website: shetin.rkursk.ru

Semyonovka (Russian: Семёновка) is a rural locality (Russian: деревня, lit. 'village') in Shchetinsky Selsoviet Rural Settlement, Kursky District, Kursk Oblast, Russia. Population: 42 (2010 census); 81 (2002 census);

== Geography ==
The village is located on the Vinogrobl River (a left tributary of the Tuskar in the basin of the Seym), 106 km from the Russia–Ukraine border, 9 km north-east of the district center – the town Kursk, 7 km from the selsoviet center – Shchetinka.

Climate

Semyonovka has a warm-summer humid continental climate (Dfb in the Köppen climate classification).

== Transport ==
Semyonovka is located 10 km from the federal route P-298 (Kursk – Voronezh – P-22 "Kaspy" Highway; a part of the European route E38), 5 km from the road of regional importance 38K-016 (Kursk – Kastornoye), 4 km from the road 38K-018 (Kursk – Ponyri), 0.6 km from the road of intermunicipal significance 38H-327 (38K-016 – Muravlevo – Mikhaylovo – Nozdrachevo), 4 km from the nearest railway station Nozdrachyovo (railway line Kursk – 146 km).

The rural locality is situated 9 km from Kursk Vostochny Airport, 131 km from Belgorod International Airport and 200 km from Voronezh Peter the Great Airport.
