= Denisovo =

Denisovo may refer to several localities in Russia:

- Denisovo, Kursk Oblast
- Denisovo, Gorokhovetsky District, Vladimir Oblast
- Denisovo, Petushinsky District, Vladimir Oblast
- Denisovo, Selivanovsky District, Vladimir Oblast
- Denisovo, Ustyuzhensky District, Vologda Oblast
