= Glebovo =

Glebovo may refer to the following places in Russia:

- Glebovo, Kursky District, Kursk Oblast, a selo
- Glebovo, Medvensky District, Kursk Oblast, a selo
- Glebovo, Vladimir Oblast, a village
- Glebovo, Vologda Oblast, a village

== See also ==
- Glebov
