= Sapogovo, Kursk Oblast =

Rural locality in Kursk Oblast, Russia

Sapogovo Сапогово
- Village
- Interactive map of Sapogovo
- Location of Sapogovo Sapogovo (Kursk Oblast)
- Coordinates: 51°49′13″N 36°12′43″E
- Country: Russia
- Federal subject: Kursk Oblast
- Administrative district: Kursky District
- SelsovietSelsoviet: Pashkovsky

Population (2010 Census)
  - Total: 979
  - Estimate (2010): 979 (0%)

Municipal status
  - Municipal district: Kursky Municipal District
  - Rural settlement: Pashkovsky Selsoviet Rural Settlement
- Time zone: UTC+3 (MSK)
- Postal code: 305515
- Dialing code: +7 4712
- OKTMO ID: 38620460161
- Website: pashkovskiy.rkursk.ru

Sapogovo (Russian: Сапогово) is a rural locality (Russian: деревня, lit. 'village') in Pashkovsky Selsoviet Rural Settlement, Kursky District, Kursk Oblast, Russia. Population: 979 (2010 census); 891 (2002 census);

== Geography ==
The village is located on the Tuskar River (a right tributary of the Seym), 99 km from the Russia–Ukraine border, 2 km north of the district center – the town Kursk, 6.5 km from the selsoviet center – Chaplygina.

Streets

There are the following streets in the locality: Bereznik, Dorozhnaya, Lesnaya, Novosyolov, Pervomayskaya, Polevaya, Rogozhkina, Sadovaya, Shkolnaya, Tsentralnaya and Vygonnaya (382 houses).

Climate

Sapogovo has a warm-summer humid continental climate (Dfb in the Köppen climate classification).

Climate data for Sapogovo
| Month | Jan | Feb | Mar | Apr | May | Jun | Jul | Aug | Sep | Oct | Nov | Dec | Year |
|---|---|---|---|---|---|---|---|---|---|---|---|---|---|
| Mean daily maximum °C (°F) | −4.3 (24.3) | −3.3 (26.1) | 2.5 (36.5) | 12.9 (55.2) | 19.3 (66.7) | 22.6 (72.7) | 25.3 (77.5) | 24.5 (76.1) | 18.1 (64.6) | 10.4 (50.7) | 3.2 (37.8) | −1.4 (29.5) | 10.8 (51.5) |
| Daily mean °C (°F) | −6.4 (20.5) | −5.9 (21.4) | −1.1 (30.0) | 8.1 (46.6) | 14.6 (58.3) | 18.3 (64.9) | 20.9 (69.6) | 19.9 (67.8) | 13.9 (57.0) | 7.1 (44.8) | 1 (34) | −3.3 (26.1) | 7.3 (45.1) |
| Mean daily minimum °C (°F) | −8.9 (16.0) | −9 (16) | −5.1 (22.8) | 2.5 (36.5) | 8.9 (48.0) | 12.9 (55.2) | 15.7 (60.3) | 14.8 (58.6) | 9.6 (49.3) | 3.8 (38.8) | −1.4 (29.5) | −5.5 (22.1) | 3.2 (37.8) |
| Average precipitation mm (inches) | 51 (2.0) | 44 (1.7) | 47 (1.9) | 50 (2.0) | 60 (2.4) | 68 (2.7) | 70 (2.8) | 55 (2.2) | 59 (2.3) | 59 (2.3) | 46 (1.8) | 48 (1.9) | 657 (26) |
Source: https://en.climate-data.org/asia/russian-federation/kursk-oblast/сапогово-656071/

== Transport ==
Sapogovo is located 5 km from the federal route M-2 Crimea Highway (a part of the European route E105), 3.5 km from the road of regional importance 38K-018 (Kursk – Ponyri), on the roads of intermunicipal significance 38H-379 (Kursk – Iskra) and 38H-380 (38N-379 – Ovsyannikovo – Pashkovo), 3.5 km from the railway junction 530 km (railway line Oryol – Kursk).

The rural locality is situated 9.5 km from Kursk Vostochny Airport, 132 km from Belgorod International Airport and 208 km from Voronezh Peter the Great Airport.
