= Reutov, Kursk Oblast =

Rural locality in Kursk Oblast, Russia

Reutov Реутов
- Khutor
- Interactive map of Reutov
- Location of Reutov Reutov (Kursk Oblast)
- Coordinates: 51°53′28″N 36°06′43″E
- Country: Russia
- Federal subject: Kursk Oblast
- Administrative district: Kursky District
- SelsovietSelsoviet: Pashkovsky

Population (2010 Census)
  - Total: 88
  - Estimate (2010): 88 (0%)

Municipal status
  - Municipal district: Kursky Municipal District
  - Rural settlement: Pashkovsky Selsoviet Rural Settlement
- Time zone: UTC+3 (MSK)
- Postal code: 305515
- Dialing code: +7 4712
- OKTMO ID: 38620460156
- Website: pashkovskiy.rkursk.ru

Reutov (Russian: Реутов) is a rural locality (a khutor) in Pashkovsky Selsoviet Rural Settlement, Kursky District, Kursk Oblast, Russia. Population: 88 (2010 census); 82 (2002 census);

== Geography ==
The khutor is located 100 km from the Russia–Ukraine border, 8 km north of the district center – the town Kursk, 4 km from the selsoviet center – Chaplygina.

Climate

Reutov has a warm-summer humid continental climate (Dfb in the Köppen climate classification).

== Transport ==
Reutov is located 4.5 km from the federal route M-2 Crimea Highway (a part of the European route E105), 10 km from the road of intermunicipal significance 38H-379 (Kursk – Iskra), 2 km from the road 38H-381 (38N-379 – Chaplygina – Alyabyevo), on the road 38H-385 (38N-381 – 1st Kurasovo), 12 km from the nearest railway halt Bukreyevka (railway line Oryol – Kursk).

The rural locality is situated 19 km from Kursk Vostochny Airport, 141 km from Belgorod International Airport and 215 km from Voronezh Peter the Great Airport.
