= Moshkino, Kursk Oblast =

Rural locality in Kursk Oblast, Russia

Moshkino Мошкино
- Village
- Interactive map of Moshkino
- Location of Moshkino Moshkino (Kursk Oblast)
- Coordinates: 51°50′47″N 36°11′38″E
- Country: Russia
- Federal subject: Kursk Oblast
- Administrative district: Kursky District
- SelsovietSelsoviet: Pashkovsky

Population (2010 Census)
  - Total: 48
  - Estimate (2010): 48 (0%)

Municipal status
  - Municipal district: Kursky Municipal District
  - Rural settlement: Pashkovsky Selsoviet Rural Settlement
- Time zone: UTC+3 (MSK)
- Postal code: 305514
- Dialing code: +7 4712
- OKTMO ID: 38620460141
- Website: pashkovskiy.rkursk.ru

Moshkino (Russian: Мошкино) is a rural locality (Russian: деревня, lit. 'village') in Pashkovsky Selsoviet Rural Settlement, Kursky District, Kursk Oblast, Russia. Population: 48 (2010 census); 58 (2002 census);

== Geography ==
The village is located on the Obmet River (a right tributary of the Tuskar in the basin of the Seym), 100 km from the Russia–Ukraine border, 4 km north of the district center – the town Kursk, 4 km from the selsoviet center – Chaplygina.

Climate

Moshkino has a warm-summer humid continental climate (Dfb in the Köppen climate classification).

== Transport ==
Moshkino is located 5.5 km from the federal route M-2 Crimea Highway (a part of the European route E105), 5 km from the road of regional importance 38K-018 (Kursk – Ponyri), 3.5 km from the road of intermunicipal significance 38H-379 (Kursk – Iskra), 3 km from the road 38H-381 (38N-379 – Chaplygina – Alyabyevo), on the road 38H-780 (38N-381 – Moshkino), 5.5 km from the nearest railway halt Bukreyevka (railway line Oryol – Kursk).

The rural locality is situated 12 km from Kursk Vostochny Airport, 135 km from Belgorod International Airport and 209 km from Voronezh Peter the Great Airport.
