= 2nd Kurasovo =

Rural locality in Kursk Oblast, Russia

2nd Kurasovo 2-е Курасово
- Village
- Interactive map of 2nd Kurasovo
- Location of 2nd Kurasovo 2nd Kurasovo (Kursk Oblast)
- Coordinates: 51°54′10″N 36°06′50″E
- Country: Russia
- Federal subject: Kursk Oblast
- Administrative district: Kursky District
- SelsovietSelsoviet: Pashkovsky

Population (2010 Census)
  - Total: 190
  - Estimate (2010): 190 (0%)

Municipal status
  - Municipal district: Kursky Municipal District
  - Rural settlement: Pashkovsky Selsoviet Rural Settlement
- Time zone: UTC+3 (MSK)
- Postal code: 305515
- Dialing code: +7 4712
- OKTMO ID: 38620460136
- Website: pashkovskiy.rkursk.ru

2nd Kurasovo or Vtoroye Kurasovo (Russian: 2-е Курасово, Второе Курасово) is a rural locality (Russian: деревня, lit. 'village') in Pashkovsky Selsoviet Rural Settlement, Kursky District, Kursk Oblast, Russia. Population: 190 (2010 census); 219 (2002 census);

== Geography ==
The village is located 101 km from the Russia–Ukraine border, 9 km north of the district center – the town Kursk, and 4.5 km from the selsoviet center – Chaplygina.

Climate

2nd Kurasovo has a warm-summer humid continental climate (Dfb in the Köppen climate classification).

== Transport ==
2nd Kurasovo is located 5 km from the federal route M-2 Crimea Highway (a part of the European route E105), 11 km from the road of intermunicipal significance 38H-379 (Kursk – Iskra), 3 km from the road 38H-381 (38N-379 – Chaplygina – Alyabyevo), on the road 38H-385 (38N-381 – 1st Kurasovo), 12.5 km from the nearest railway halt Bukreyevka (railway line Oryol – Kursk).

The rural locality is situated 20 km from Kursk Vostochny Airport, 143 km from Belgorod International Airport and 215 km from Voronezh Peter the Great Airport.
