= Yeskovo, Kursk Oblast =

Rural locality in Kursk Oblast, Russia

Yeskovo Еськово
- Village
- Interactive map of Yeskovo
- Location of Yeskovo Yeskovo (Kursk Oblast)
- Coordinates: 51°49′51″N 36°23′36″E
- Country: Russia
- Federal subject: Kursk Oblast
- Administrative district: Kursky District
- SelsovietSelsoviet: Nozdrachevsky

Population (2010 Census)
  - Total: 73
  - Estimate (2010): 73 (0%)

Municipal status
  - Municipal district: Kursky Municipal District
  - Rural settlement: Nozdrachevsky Selsoviet Rural Settlement
- Time zone: UTC+3 (MSK)
- Postal code: 305513
- Dialing code: +7 4712
- OKTMO ID: 38620456111
- Website: nozdrachevo.rkursk.ru

Yeskovo (Russian: Еськово) is a rural locality (Russian: деревня, lit. 'village') in Nozdrachevsky Selsoviet Rural Settlement, Kursky District, Kursk Oblast, Russia. Population: 73 (2010 census); 72 (2002 census);

== Geography ==
The village is located on the Vinogrobl River (a left tributary of the Tuskar in the basin of the Seym), 109 km from the Russia–Ukraine border, 12 km north-east of the district center – the town Kursk, 2 km from the selsoviet center – Nozdrachevo.

Climate

Yeskovo has a warm-summer humid continental climate (Dfb in the Köppen climate classification).

== Transport ==
Yeskovo is located 18 km from the federal route M-2 Crimea Highway (a part of the European route E105), 5 km from the road of regional importance 38K-016 (Kursk – Kastornoye), on the road of intermunicipal significance 38H-331 (38K-016 – Nozdrachevo – Vinogrobl), 5 km from the nearest railway halt 18 km (railway line Kursk – 146 km).

The rural locality is situated 11 km from Kursk Vostochny Airport, 131 km from Belgorod International Airport and 196 km from Voronezh Peter the Great Airport.
