= Volobuyevo, Pashkovsky selsoviet, Kursky District, Kursk Oblast =

Rural locality in Kursk Oblast, Russia

Volobuyevo Волобуево
- Village
- Interactive map of Volobuyevo
- Location of Volobuyevo Volobuyevo (Kursk Oblast)
- Coordinates: 51°53′27″N 36°10′38″E
- Country: Russia
- Federal subject: Kursk Oblast
- Administrative district: Kursky District
- SelsovietSelsoviet: Pashkovsky

Population (2010 Census)
  - Total: 48
  - Estimate (2010): 48 (0%)

Municipal status
  - Municipal district: Kursky Municipal District
  - Rural settlement: Pashkovsky Selsoviet Rural Settlement
- Time zone: UTC+3 (MSK)
- Postal code: 307015
- Dialing code: +7 4712
- OKTMO ID: 38620460111
- Website: pashkovskiy.rkursk.ru

Volobuyevo (Russian: Волобуево) is a rural locality (Russian: деревня, lit. 'village') in Pashkovsky Selsoviet Rural Settlement, Kursky District, Kursk Oblast, Russia. Population: 48 (2010 census); 59 (2002 census);

== Geography ==
The village is located on the Obmet River (a right tributary of the Tuskar in the basin of the Seym), 103 km from the Russia–Ukraine border, 8 km north of the district center – the town Kursk, 1 km from the selsoviet center – Chaplygina.

Climate

Volobuyevo has a warm-summer humid continental climate (Dfb in the Köppen climate classification).

== Transport ==
Volobuyevo is located 7.5 km from the federal route M-2 Crimea Highway (a part of the European route E105), 8 km from the road of intermunicipal significance 38H-379 (Kursk – Iskra), 1 km from the road 38H-381 (38N-379 – Chaplygina – Alyabyevo), on the road 38H-383 (38N-381 – Volobuyevo), 8 km from the nearest railway halt Bukreyevka (railway line Oryol – Kursk).

The rural locality is situated 16.5 km from Kursk Vostochny Airport, 140 km from Belgorod International Airport and 210 km from Voronezh Peter the Great Airport.
