= Sotnikovo, Kursky District, Kursk Oblast =

Rural locality in Kursk Oblast, Russia

Sotnikovo Сотниково
- Village
- Interactive map of Sotnikovo
- Location of Sotnikovo Sotnikovo (Kursk Oblast)
- Coordinates: 51°51′21″N 36°08′10″E
- Country: Russia
- Federal subject: Kursk Oblast
- Administrative district: Kursky District
- SelsovietSelsoviet: Nizhnemedveditsky

Population (2010 Census)
  - Total: 20
  - Estimate (2010): 20 (0%)

Municipal status
  - Municipal district: Kursky Municipal District
  - Rural settlement: Nizhnemedveditsky Selsoviet Rural Settlement
- Time zone: UTC+3 (MSK)
- Postal code: 305504
- Dialing code: +7 4712
- OKTMO ID: 38620448136
- Website: nmedvedica.rkursk.ru

Sotnikovo (Russian: Сотниково) is a rural locality (Russian: деревня, lit. 'village') in Nizhnemedveditsky Selsoviet Rural Settlement, Kursky District, Kursk Oblast, Russia. Population: 20 (2010 census); 38 (2002 census);

== Geography ==
The village is located 98 km from the Russia–Ukraine border, 14 km north-west of Kursk, 3 km from the selsoviet center – Verkhnyaya Medveditsa.

Climate

Sotnikovo has a warm-summer humid continental climate (Dfb in the Köppen climate classification).

== Transport ==
Sotnikovo is located 3 km from the federal route M-2 Crimea Highway (a part of the European route E105), 6 km from the road of intermunicipal significance 38Н-379 (Kursk – Iskra), 0.7 km from the road 38Н-381 (38N-379 – Chaplygina – Alyabevo), 9.5 km from the nearest railway halt Bukreyevka (railway line Oryol – Kursk).

The rural locality is situated 15 km from Kursk Vostochny Airport, 137 km from Belgorod International Airport and 213 km from Voronezh Peter the Great Airport.
