= Shuklinka, Kursky District, Kursk Oblast =

Rural locality in Kursk Oblast, Russia

Shuklinka Шуклинка
- Village
- Interactive map of Shuklinka
- Location of Shuklinka Shuklinka (Kursk Oblast)
- Coordinates: 51°48′18″N 36°11′55″E
- Country: Russia
- Federal subject: Kursk Oblast
- Administrative district: Kursky District
- SelsovietSelsoviet: Shchetinsky

Population (2010 Census)
  - Total: 190
  - Estimate (2010): 190 (0%)

Municipal status
  - Municipal district: Kursky Municipal District
  - Rural settlement: Shchetinsky Selsoviet Rural Settlement
- Time zone: UTC+3 (MSK)
- Postal code: 305514
- Dialing code: +7 4712
- OKTMO ID: 38620492136
- Website: shetin.rkursk.ru

Shuklinka (Russian: Шуклинка) is a rural locality (Russian: деревня, lit. 'village') in Shchetinsky Selsoviet Rural Settlement, Kursky District, Kursk Oblast, Russia. Population: 190 (2010 census); 187 (2002 census);

== Geography ==
The village is located on the Tuskar River (a right tributary of the Seym), 97 km from the Russia–Ukraine border, at the northern border of the district center – the town Kursk, 2 km from the selsoviet center – Shchetinka.

Streets

There are the following streets in the locality: Glebovskaya, Malinovaya, Pokrovskaya, Troitskaya and Troitsky pereulok (144 houses).

Climate

Shuklinka has a warm-summer humid continental climate (Dfb in the Köppen climate classification).

Climate data for Shuklinka
Month	Jan	Feb	Mar	Apr	May	Jun	Jul	Aug	Sep	Oct	Nov	Dec	Year
Mean daily maximum °C (°F)	−4.3 (24.3)	−3.3 (26.1)	2.5 (36.5)	12.9 (55.2)	19.3 (66.7)	22.6 (72.7)	25.3 (77.5)	24.5 (76.1)	18.1 (64.6)	10.4 (50.7)	3.2 (37.8)	−1.4 (29.5)	10.8 (51.5)
Daily mean °C (°F)	−6.4 (20.5)	−5.9 (21.4)	−1.1 (30.0)	8.1 (46.6)	14.6 (58.3)	18.3 (64.9)	20.9 (69.6)	19.9 (67.8)	13.9 (57.0)	7.1 (44.8)	1 (34)	−3.3 (26.1)	7.3 (45.1)
Mean daily minimum °C (°F)	−8.9 (16.0)	−9 (16)	−5.1 (22.8)	2.5 (36.5)	8.9 (48.0)	12.9 (55.2)	15.7 (60.3)	14.8 (58.6)	9.6 (49.3)	3.8 (38.8)	−1.4 (29.5)	−5.5 (22.1)	3.2 (37.8)
Average precipitation mm (inches)	51 (2.0)	44 (1.7)	47 (1.9)	50 (2.0)	60 (2.4)	68 (2.7)	70 (2.8)	55 (2.2)	59 (2.3)	59 (2.3)	46 (1.8)	48 (1.9)	657 (26)
Source: https://en.climate-data.org/asia/russian-federation/kursk-oblast/шуклинка-656072/

== Transport ==
Shuklinka is located 4.5 km from the federal route M-2 Crimea Highway (a part of the European route E105), 1 km from the road of intermunicipal significance 38H-379 (Kursk – Iskra), on the road 38H-386 (38N-379 – Shuklinka), 4 km from the railway junction 530 km (railway line Oryol – Kursk).

The rural locality is situated 7 km from Kursk Vostochny Airport, 130 km from Belgorod International Airport and 209 km from Voronezh Peter the Great Airport.
