= Lazurny, Kursk Oblast =

Rural locality in Kursk Oblast, Russia

Lazurny Лазурный
- Settlement
- Interactive map of Lazurny
- Location of Lazurny Lazurny (Kursk Oblast)
- Coordinates: 51°48′02″N 36°15′28″E
- Country: Russia
- Federal subject: Kursk Oblast
- Administrative district: Kursky District
- SelsovietSelsoviet: Shchetinsky

Population (2010 Census)
  - Total: 576
  - Estimate (2010): 576 (0%)

Municipal status
  - Municipal district: Kursky Municipal District
  - Rural settlement: Shchetinsky Selsoviet Rural Settlement
- Time zone: UTC+3 (MSK)
- Postal code: 305511
- Dialing code: +7 4712
- OKTMO ID: 38620492146
- Website: shetin.rkursk.ru

Lazurny (Russian: Лазурный) is a rural locality (a settlement) in Shchetinsky Selsoviet Rural Settlement, Kursky District, Kursk Oblast, Russia. Population: 576 (2010 census); 547 (2002 census);

== Geography ==
The settlement is located 100 km from the Russia–Ukraine border, 3 km north-east of the district center – the town Kursk, 1.5 km from the selsoviet center – Shchetinka.

Streets

There are the following streets in the locality: Lunnaya, Poselochnaya, Poselochnaya Vtoraya and Poselochnaya Tretya (43 houses).

Climate

Lazurny has a warm-summer humid continental climate (Dfb in the Köppen climate classification).

Climate data for Lazurny
Month	Jan	Feb	Mar	Apr	May	Jun	Jul	Aug	Sep	Oct	Nov	Dec	Year
Mean daily maximum °C (°F)	−4.3 (24.3)	−3.4 (25.9)	2.5 (36.5)	12.9 (55.2)	19.3 (66.7)	22.6 (72.7)	25.3 (77.5)	24.6 (76.3)	18 (64)	10.4 (50.7)	3.2 (37.8)	−1.4 (29.5)	10.8 (51.4)
Daily mean °C (°F)	−6.4 (20.5)	−5.9 (21.4)	−1.1 (30.0)	8 (46)	14.6 (58.3)	18.3 (64.9)	20.9 (69.6)	19.9 (67.8)	13.9 (57.0)	7.1 (44.8)	0.9 (33.6)	−3.3 (26.1)	7.2 (45.0)
Mean daily minimum °C (°F)	−8.9 (16.0)	−8.9 (16.0)	−5.1 (22.8)	2.5 (36.5)	8.9 (48.0)	12.9 (55.2)	15.8 (60.4)	14.8 (58.6)	9.6 (49.3)	3.8 (38.8)	−1.4 (29.5)	−5.5 (22.1)	3.2 (37.8)
Average precipitation mm (inches)	51 (2.0)	44 (1.7)	47 (1.9)	50 (2.0)	60 (2.4)	68 (2.7)	70 (2.8)	55 (2.2)	59 (2.3)	59 (2.3)	46 (1.8)	48 (1.9)	657 (26)
Source: https://en.climate-data.org/asia/russian-federation/kursk-oblast/лазурныи-666568/

== Transport ==
Lazurny is located 9 km from the federal route M-2 Crimea Highway (a part of the European route E105), on the road of regional importance 38K-018 (Kursk – Ponyri), on the road of intermunicipal significance 38H-402 (38K-018 – Kamyshi), 0.2 km from the railway junction 530 km (railway line Oryol – Kursk).

The rural locality is situated 6 km from Kursk Vostochny Airport, 128 km from Belgorod International Airport and 204 km from Voronezh Peter the Great Airport.
