= Kamenevo, Kamyshinsky selsoviet, Kursky District, Kursk Oblast =

Rural locality in Kursk Oblast, Russia

Kamenevo Каменево
- Village
- Interactive map of Kamenevo
- Location of Kamenevo Kamenevo (Kursk Oblast)
- Coordinates: 51°49′19″N 36°15′23″E
- Country: Russia
- Federal subject: Kursk Oblast
- Administrative district: Kursky District
- SelsovietSelsoviet: Kamyshinsky

Population (2010 Census)
  - Total: 476
  - Estimate (2010): 476 (0%)

Municipal status
  - Municipal district: Kursky Municipal District
  - Rural settlement: Kamyshinsky Selsoviet Rural Settlement
- Time zone: UTC+3 (MSK)
- Postal code: 305512
- Dialing code: +7 4712
- OKTMO ID: 38620426116
- Website: kamish.rkursk.ru

Kamenevo (Russian: Каменево) is a rural locality (Russian: деревня, lit. 'village') in Kamyshinsky Selsoviet Rural Settlement, Kursky District, Kursk Oblast, Russia. Population: 476 (2010 census); 483 (2002 census);

== Geography ==
The village is located on the Vinogrobl River (a left tributary of the Tuskar in the basin of the Seym), 102 km from the Russia–Ukraine border, 5 km north-east of the district center – the town Kursk, at the north-western border of the selsoviet center – Kamyshi.

Streets

There is Severnaya Street (200 houses).

Climate

Kamenevo has a warm-summer humid continental climate (Dfb in the Köppen climate classification).

== Transport ==
Kamenevo is located 9 km from the federal route M-2 Crimea Highway (a part of the European route E105), on the road of regional importance 38K-018 (Kursk – Ponyri), on the road of intermunicipal significance 38H-400 (38K-018 – Kamenevo), 2 km from the railway junction 530 km (railway line Oryol – Kursk).

The rural locality is situated 7 km from Kursk Vostochny Airport, 131 km from Belgorod International Airport and 205 km from Voronezh Peter the Great Airport.
