= Shagarovo, Kursky District, Kursk Oblast =

Rural locality in Kursk Oblast, Russia

Shagarovo Шагарово
- Village
- Interactive map of Shagarovo
- Location of Shagarovo Shagarovo (Kursk Oblast)
- Coordinates: 51°50′13″N 36°21′27″E
- Country: Russia
- Federal subject: Kursk Oblast
- Administrative district: Kursky District
- SelsovietSelsoviet: Nozdrachevsky

Population (2010 Census)
  - Total: 120
  - Estimate (2010): 120 (0%)

Municipal status
  - Municipal district: Kursky Municipal District
  - Rural settlement: Nozdrachevsky Selsoviet Rural Settlement
- Time zone: UTC+3 (MSK)
- Postal code: 305513
- Dialing code: +7 4712
- OKTMO ID: 38620456116
- Website: nozdrachevo.rkursk.ru

Shagarovo (Russian: Шагарово) is a rural locality (Russian: деревня, lit. 'village') in Nozdrachevsky Selsoviet Rural Settlement, Kursky District, Kursk Oblast, Russia. Population: 120 (2010 census); 114 (2002 census);

== Geography ==
The village is located on the Vinogrobl River (a left tributary of the Tuskar in the basin of the Seym), 107 km from the Russia–Ukraine border, 10 km north-east of the district center – the town Kursk, 1 km from the selsoviet center – Nozdrachevo.

Climate

Shagarovo has a warm-summer humid continental climate (Dfb in the Köppen climate classification).

== Transport ==
Shagarovo is located 16 km from the federal route M-2 Crimea Highway (a part of the European route E105), 6 km from the road of regional importance 38K-016 (Kursk – Kastornoye), on the road of intermunicipal significance 38H-483 (Nozdrachevo – Shagarovo), 5.5 km from the nearest railway station Nozdrachyovo (railway line Kursk – 146 km).

The rural locality is situated 11 km from Kursk Vostochny Airport, 132 km from Belgorod International Airport and 198 km from Voronezh Peter the Great Airport.
