= Malakhovo, Kursky District, Kursk Oblast =

Rural locality in Kursk Oblast, Russia

Malakhovo Малахово
- Village
- Interactive map of Malakhovo
- Location of Malakhovo Malakhovo (Kursk Oblast)
- Coordinates: 51°52′52″N 36°19′00″E
- Country: Russia
- Federal subject: Kursk Oblast
- Administrative district: Kursky District
- SelsovietSelsoviet: Kamyshinsky

Population (2010 Census)
  - Total: 157
  - Estimate (2010): 157 (0%)

Municipal status
  - Municipal district: Kursky Municipal District
  - Rural settlement: Kamyshinsky Selsoviet Rural Settlement
- Time zone: UTC+3 (MSK)
- Postal code: 305530
- Dialing code: +7 4712
- OKTMO ID: 38620426126
- Website: kamish.rkursk.ru

Malakhovo (Russian: Малахово) is a rural locality (Russian: деревня, lit. 'village') in Kamyshinsky Selsoviet Rural Settlement, Kursky District, Kursk Oblast, Russia. Population: 157 (2010 census); 173 (2002 census);

== Geography ==
The village is located in the Tuskar River basin (a right tributary of the Seym), 109 km from the Russia–Ukraine border, 13 km north-east of the district center – the town Kursk, 8 km from the selsoviet center – Kamyshi.

Streets

There is Novaya Street and 76 houses.

Climate

Malakhovo has a warm-summer humid continental climate (Dfb in the Köppen climate classification).

== Transport ==
Malakhovo is located 14 km from the federal route M-2 Crimea Highway (a part of the European route E105), on the road of regional importance 38K-018 (Kursk – Ponyri), 1 km from the nearest railway halt 521 km (railway line Oryol – Kursk).

The rural locality is situated 14 km from Kursk Vostochny Airport, 138 km from Belgorod International Airport and 201 km from Voronezh Peter the Great Airport.
