= 1st Kurasovo =

Rural locality in Kursk Oblast, Russia

1st Kurasovo 1-е Курасово
- Village
- Interactive map of 1st Kurasovo
- Location of 1st Kurasovo 1st Kurasovo (Kursk Oblast)
- Coordinates: 51°53′57″N 36°08′40″E
- Country: Russia
- Federal subject: Kursk Oblast
- Administrative district: Kursky District
- SelsovietSelsoviet: Pashkovsky

Population (2010 Census)
  - Total: 116
  - Estimate (2010): 116 (0%)

Municipal status
  - Municipal district: Kursky Municipal District
  - Rural settlement: Pashkovsky Selsoviet Rural Settlement
- Time zone: UTC+3 (MSK)
- Postal code: 305515
- Dialing code: +7 4712
- OKTMO ID: 38620460131
- Website: pashkovskiy.rkursk.ru

1st Kurasovo or Pervoye Kurasovo (Russian: 1-е Курасово, Первое Курасово) is a rural locality (Russian: деревня, lit. 'village') in Pashkovsky Selsoviet Rural Settlement, Kursky District, Kursk Oblast, Russia. Population: 116 (2010 census); 122 (2002 census);

== Geography ==
The village is located 1.5 km west from the Obmet River (a right tributary of the Tuskar in the basin of the Seym), 102 km from the Russia–Ukraine border, 9 km north of the district center – the town Kursk, 3 km from the selsoviet center – Chaplygina.

Climate

1st Kurasovo has a warm-summer humid continental climate (Dfb in the Köppen climate classification).

== Transport ==
1st Kurasovo is located 7 km from the federal route M-2 Crimea Highway (a part of the European route E105), 10 km from the road of intermunicipal significance 38H-379 (Kursk – Iskra), 2.5 km from the road 38H-381 (38N-379 – Chaplygina – Alyabyevo), on the road 38H-385 (38N-381 – 1st Kurasovo), 10 km from the nearest railway halt Bukreyevka (railway line Oryol – Kursk).

The rural locality is situated 19 km from Kursk Vostochny Airport, 141 km from Belgorod International Airport and 212 km from Voronezh Peter the Great Airport.
