= Volobuyevo, Kamyshinsky selsoviet, Kursky District, Kursk Oblast =

Rural locality in Kursk Oblast, Russia

Volobuyevo Волобуево
- Village
- Interactive map of Volobuyevo
- Location of Volobuyevo Volobuyevo (Kursk Oblast)
- Coordinates: 51°52′39″N 36°16′18″E
- Country: Russia
- Federal subject: Kursk Oblast
- Administrative district: Kursky District
- SelsovietSelsoviet: Kamyshinsky

Population (2010 Census)
  - Total: 152
  - Estimate (2010): 152 (0%)

Municipal status
  - Municipal district: Kursky Municipal District
  - Rural settlement: Kamyshinsky Selsoviet Rural Settlement
- Time zone: UTC+3 (MSK)
- Postal code: 305530
- Dialing code: +7 4712
- OKTMO ID: 38620426111
- Website: kamish.rkursk.ru

Volobuyevo (Russian: Волобуево) is a rural locality (Russian: деревня, lit. 'village') in Kamyshinsky Selsoviet Rural Settlement, Kursky District, Kursk Oblast, Russia. Population: 152 (2010 census); 179 (2002 census);

== Geography ==
The village is located on the Tuskar River (a right tributary of the Seym), 107 km from the Russia–Ukraine border, 10 km north-east of the district center – the town Kursk, 7 km from the selsoviet center – Kamyshi.

Climate

Volobuyevo has a warm-summer humid continental climate (Dfb in the Köppen climate classification).

== Transport ==
Volobuyevo is located 12 km from the federal route M-2 Crimea Highway (a part of the European route E105), 2 km from the road of regional importance 38K-018 (Kursk – Ponyri), on the road of intermunicipal significance 38H-391 (38K-018 – Volobuyevo – Kurkino), 1.5 km from the nearest railway halt 521 km (railway line Oryol – Kursk).

The rural locality is situated 13 km from Kursk Vostochny Airport, 138 km from Belgorod International Airport and 204 km from Voronezh Peter the Great Airport.
