= Gleb =

Gleb (Russian: Глеб) is a Russian male given name derived from the Old Norse name Guðleifr, which means 'heir of god', from guð ('god') and leifr ('heir'). It is popular in Russia due to an early martyr, Saint Gleb, who is venerated by Eastern Orthodox churches. The Ukrainian equivalent is Hlib.

Notable people with the name include:

== People ==
- Gleb of Kiev (died 1171), grand prince of Kiev
- Gleb Axelrod (1923–2003), Russian pianist
- Gleb Baklanov (1910–1976), Russian general
- Gleb Boglayevskiy (born 1986), Russian football player
- Gleb Botkin (1900–1969), Russian-born American memoirist and illustrator
- Gleb Brussenskiy (born 2000), Kazakh cyclist
- Gleb W. Derujinsky (1888–1975), Russian-American sculptor
- Gleb Galperin (born 1985), Russian diver
- Gleb Ilyin (1889–1968), Russian-American painter
- Gleb Korablyov (2001–2018), Russian student who fatally shot himself on a VKontakte livestream
- Gleb Kotelnikov (1872–1944), Russian inventor
- Gleb Krotkov (1901–1968), Canadian scientist
- Gleb Krzhizhanovsky (1872–1959), Russian economist
- Gleb Lapitsky (born 1988), Belarusian politician
- Gleb Lozino-Lozinskiy (1909–2001), Russian engineer
- Gleb Lutfullin (born 2004), Russian figure skater
- Gleb Vladimirovich Nosovsky (born 1958), Russian mathematician
- Gleb Panfilov (1934–2023), Russian film director
- Gleb Panfyorov (born 1970), Russian football player
- Gleb Pavlovsky (1951–2023), Russian political scientist
- Gleb Pisarevskiy (born 1976), Russian weightlifter
- Gleb Pugachyov (born 2008), Russian ice hockey player
- Gleb Sakharov (born 1988), French tennis player
- Gleb Savchenko (born 1984), Russian dancer
- Gleb Savinov (1915–2000), Russian painter
- Gleb Shishmaryov (1781–1835), Russian admiral
- Gleb Shulpyakov (born 1971), Russian writer
- Gleb Strizhenov (1925–1985), Soviet-Russian actor
- Gleb Struve (1898–1985), Russian poet and literary historian
- Gleb Svyatoslavich (died 1078), prince of Tmutarakan
- Gleb Svyatoslavich (Prince of Chernigov) (1168–1215), prince of Chernigov
- Gleb Syritsa (born 2000), Russian cyclist
- Gleb Uspensky (1843–1902), Russian writer
- Gleb Veremyev (born 2003), American ice hockey player
- Gleb Wataghin (1899–1986), Italian scientist
- Gleb Yakunin (1934–2014), Russian priest and dissident

== Fictional characters ==
- Gleb Nerzhin, leading character, mathematician, prisoner, and Solzhenitsyn's alter ego in In the First Circle; Solzhenitsyn also uses Nerzhin in some of his writings about his experiences in World War II
- Gleb, a female character in the 2017 video game Star Wars Battlefront II
- Gleb Vaganov, main antagonist in 2016 musical Anastasia
- Gleb Zheglov, main character in 1979 Soviet mini-series The Meeting Place Cannot Be Changed
