= Bukreyevka, Kamyshinsky selsoviet, Kursky District, Kursk Oblast =

Rural locality in Kursk Oblast, Russia

Bukreyevka Букреевка
- Village
- Interactive map of Bukreyevka
- Location of Bukreyevka Bukreyevka (Kursk Oblast)
- Coordinates: 51°50′31″N 36°14′52″E
- Country: Russia
- Federal subject: Kursk Oblast
- Administrative district: Kursky District
- SelsovietSelsoviet: Kamyshinsky

Population (2010 Census)
  - Total: 669
  - Estimate (2010): 669 (0%)

Municipal status
  - Municipal district: Kursky Municipal District
  - Rural settlement: Kamyshinsky Selsoviet Rural Settlement
- Time zone: UTC+3 (MSK)
- Postal code: 305530
- Dialing code: +7 4712
- OKTMO ID: 38620426106
- Website: kamish.rkursk.ru

Bukreyevka (Russian: Букреевка) is a rural locality (Russian: деревня, lit. 'village') in Kamyshinsky Selsoviet Rural Settlement, Kursky District, Kursk Oblast, Russia. Population: 669 (2010 census); 696 (2002 census);

== Geography ==
The village is located 103 km from the Russia–Ukraine border, 6 km north-east of the district center – the town Kursk, 4 km from the selsoviet center – Kamyshi.

Streets

There are the following streets in the locality: Lugovaya, Rodnikovaya, tupik Rodnikovy, Sirenevaya, Solnechnaya, Shirokaya, Vasilkovaya and Zelyonaya (483 houses).

Climate

Bukreyevka has a warm-summer humid continental climate (Dfb in the Köppen climate classification).

== Transport ==
Bukreyevka is located 9 km from the federal route M-2 Crimea Highway (a part of the European route E105), on the road of regional importance 38K-018 (Kursk – Ponyri), on the road of intermunicipal significance 38H-724 (38K-018 – Churilovo), in the vicinity of the railway halt 521 km (railway line Oryol – Kursk).

The rural locality is situated 10 km from Kursk Vostochny Airport, 133 km from Belgorod International Airport and 205 km from Voronezh Peter the Great Airport.
