= Kurkino, Kursk Oblast =

Rural locality in Kursk Oblast, Russia

Kurkino Куркино
- Selo
- Interactive map of Kurkino
- Location of Kurkino Kurkino (Kursk Oblast)
- Coordinates: 51°51′51″N 36°15′33″E
- Country: Russia
- Federal subject: Kursk Oblast
- Administrative district: Kursky District
- SelsovietSelsoviet: Kamyshinsky

Population (2010 Census)
  - Total: 183
  - Estimate (2010): 183 (0%)

Municipal status
  - Municipal district: Kursky Municipal District
  - Rural settlement: Kamyshinsky Selsoviet Rural Settlement
- Time zone: UTC+3 (MSK)
- Postal code: 305530
- Dialing code: +7 4712
- OKTMO ID: 38620426121
- Website: kamish.rkursk.ru

Kurkino (Russian: Куркино) is a rural locality (Russian: село, lit. 'village') in Kamyshinsky Selsoviet Rural Settlement, Kursky District, Kursk Oblast, Russia. Population: 183 (2010 census); 269 (2002 census);

== Geography ==
The village is located on the Tuskar River (a right tributary of the Seym), 106 km from the Russia–Ukraine border, 8 km north-east of the district center – the town Kursk, 6 km from the selsoviet center – Kamyshi.

Climate

Kurkino has a warm-summer humid continental climate (Dfb in the Köppen climate classification).

== Transport ==
Kurkino is located 10.5 km from the federal route M-2 Crimea Highway (a part of the European route E105), 1.5 km from the road of regional importance 38K-018 (Kursk – Ponyri), on the road of intermunicipal significance 38H-391 (38K-018 – Volobuyevo – Kurkino), 2 km from the nearest railway halt Bukreyevka (railway line Oryol – Kursk).

The rural locality is situated 12 km from Kursk Vostochny Airport, 136 km from Belgorod International Airport and 204 km from Voronezh Peter the Great Airport.
