= Glebov =

Glebov (Russian: Глебов) or Glebova (Russian: Глебова; feminine) is a Russian surname, derived from the given name Gleb. Notable people with the surname include:

- Andrey Glebov (1770–1854), Imperial Russian colonel
- Ilja Glebov (born 1987), Estonian pair skater
- Jelena Glebova (born 1989), Estonian figure skater
- Natalie Glebova (born 1981), Russian-born Canadian who won Miss Universe 2005 from Canada
- Natalya Glebova (born 1963), Russian speed skater
- Nikolai Glebov-Avilov (1887–1937), Russian Bolshevik
- Pyotr Glebov (1915–2000), Soviet actor
- Vladimir Glebov (born 1957), Russian military officer

== See also ==
- 6108 Glebov
- Vladimir "Uncle Vlad" Glebov, a central antagonist in Grand Theft Auto IV
