= Mikhaylovo, Kursk Oblast =

Rural locality in Kursk Oblast, Russia

Mikhaylovo Михайлово
- Village
- Interactive map of Mikhaylovo
- Location of Mikhaylovo Mikhaylovo (Kursk Oblast)
- Coordinates: 51°48′38″N 36°19′27″E
- Country: Russia
- Federal subject: Kursk Oblast
- Administrative district: Kursky District
- SelsovietSelsoviet: Shchetinsky

Population (2010 Census)
  - Total: 116
  - Estimate (2010): 116 (0%)

Municipal status
  - Municipal district: Kursky Municipal District
  - Rural settlement: Shchetinsky Selsoviet Rural Settlement
- Time zone: UTC+3 (MSK)
- Postal code: 305511
- Dialing code: +7 4712
- OKTMO ID: 38620492111
- Website: shetin.rkursk.ru

Mikhaylovo (Russian: Михайлово) is a rural locality (Russian: деревня, lit. 'village') in Shchetinsky Selsoviet Rural Settlement, Kursky District, Kursk Oblast, Russia. Population: 116 (2010 census); 145 (2002 census);

== Geography ==
The village is located on the Vinogrobl River (a left tributary of the Tuskar in the basin of the Seym), 104 km from the Russia–Ukraine border, 4 km north-east of the district center – the town Kursk, 6 km from the selsoviet center – Shchetinka.

=== Climate ===
Mikhaylovo has a warm-summer humid continental climate (Dfb in the Köppen climate classification).

== Transport ==
Mikhaylovo is located 9 km from the federal route P-298 (Kursk – Voronezh – P-22 "Kaspy" Highway; a part of the European route E38), 3.5 km from the road of regional importance 38K-016 (Kursk – Kastornoye), on the road of intermunicipal significance 38H-327 (38K-016 – Muravlevo – Mikhaylovo – Nozdrachevo), 2 km from the nearest railway station Nozdrachyovo (railway line Kursk – 146 km).

The rural locality is situated 6 km from Kursk Vostochny Airport, 129 km from Belgorod International Airport and 200 km from Voronezh Peter the Great Airport.
