= Muravlevo, Shchetinsky selsoviet, Kursky District, Kursk Oblast =

Rural locality in Kursk Oblast, Russia

Muravlevo Муравлево
- Village
- Interactive map of Muravlevo
- Location of Muravlevo Muravlevo (Kursk Oblast)
- Coordinates: 51°48′00″N 36°17′54″E
- Country: Russia
- Federal subject: Kursk Oblast
- Administrative district: Kursky District
- SelsovietSelsoviet: Shchetinsky

Population (2010 Census)
  - Total: 163
  - Estimate (2010): 163 (0%)

Municipal status
  - Municipal district: Kursky Municipal District
  - Rural settlement: Shchetinsky Selsoviet Rural Settlement
- Time zone: UTC+3 (MSK)
- Postal code: 305511
- Dialing code: +7 4712
- OKTMO ID: 38620492116
- Website: shetin.rkursk.ru

Muravlevo (Russian: Муравлево) is a rural locality (Russian: деревня, lit. 'village') in Shchetinsky Selsoviet Rural Settlement, Kursky District, Kursk Oblast, Russia. Population: 163 (2010 census); 176 (2002 census);

== Geography ==
The village is located on the Vinogrobl River (a left tributary of the Tuskar in the basin of the Seym), 102 km from the Russia–Ukraine border, 3 km north-east of the district center – the town Kursk, 4 km from the selsoviet center – Shchetinka.

Streets

There is Pokrovskaya and 123 houses.

Climate

Muravlevo has a warm-summer humid continental climate (Dfb in the Köppen climate classification).

== Transport ==
Muravlevo is located 7 km from the federal route P-298 (Kursk – Voronezh – P-22 "Kaspy" Highway; a part of the European route E38), 2 km from the road of regional importance 38K-016 (Kursk – Kastornoye), on the road of intermunicipal significance 38H-327 (38K-016 – Muravlevo – Mikhaylovo – Nozdrachevo), 2 km from the nearest railway station Nozdrachyovo (railway line Kursk – 146 km).

The rural locality is situated 5 km from Kursk Vostochny Airport, 129 km from Belgorod International Airport and 202 km from Voronezh Peter the Great Airport.
