= Churilovo, Kursky District, Kursk Oblast =

Rural locality in Kursk Oblast, Russia

Churilovo Чурилово
- Village
- Location of Churilovo
- Location of Churilovo Churilovo (Kursk Oblast)
- Coordinates: 51°50′10″N 36°15′12″E
- Country: Russia
- Federal subject: Kursk Oblast
- Administrative district: Kursky District
- Selsoviet: Kamyshinsky

Population (2010 Census)
  - Total: 293

Municipal status
  - Municipal district: Kursky Municipal District
  - Rural settlement: Kamyshinsky Selsoviet Rural Settlement
- Time zone: UTC+3 (MSK)
- Postal code(s): 305530
- Dialing code(s): +7 4712
- OKTMO ID: 38620426131
- Website: kamish.rkursk.ru

Churilovo (Russian: Чурилово) is a rural locality (Russian: деревня, lit. 'village') in Kamyshinsky Selsoviet Rural Settlement, Kursky District, Kursk Oblast, Russia. Population: 293 (2010 Census); 289 (2002 Census);

== Geography ==
The village is located on the Vinogrobl River (a left tributary of the Tuskar in the basin of the Seym), 102 km from the Russia–Ukraine border, 6 km north-east of the district center – the town Kursk, 3 km from the selsoviet center – Kamyshi.

Climate

Churilovo has a warm-summer humid continental climate (Dfb in the Köppen climate classification).

== Transport ==
Churilovo is located 9 km from the federal route M-2 Crimea Highway (a part of the European route E105), 0.5 km from the road of regional importance 38K-018 (Kursk – Ponyri), on the road of intermunicipal significance 38H-724 (38K-018 – Churilovo), 2 km from the nearest railway halt Bukreyevka (railway line Oryol – Kursk).

The rural locality is situated 9 km from Kursk Vostochny Airport, 133 km from Belgorod International Airport and 205 km from Voronezh Peter the Great Airport.
