= Ovsyannikovo, Kursky District, Kursk Oblast =

Rural locality in Kursk Oblast, Russia

Ovsyannikovo Овсянниково
- Village
- Interactive map of Ovsyannikovo
- Location of Ovsyannikovo Ovsyannikovo (Kursk Oblast)
- Coordinates: 51°49′54″N 36°11′53″E
- Country: Russia
- Federal subject: Kursk Oblast
- Administrative district: Kursky District
- SelsovietSelsoviet: Pashkovsky

Population (2010 Census)
  - Total: 185
  - Estimate (2010): 185 (0%)

Municipal status
  - Municipal district: Kursky Municipal District
  - Rural settlement: Pashkovsky Selsoviet Rural Settlement
- Time zone: UTC+3 (MSK)
- Postal code: 305514
- Dialing code: +7 4712
- OKTMO ID: 38620460146
- Website: pashkovskiy.rkursk.ru

Ovsyannikovo (Russian: Овсянниково) is a rural locality (Russian: деревня, lit. 'village') in Pashkovsky Selsoviet Rural Settlement, Kursky District, Kursk Oblast, Russia. Population: 185 (2010 census); 195 (2002 census);

== Geography ==
The village is located on the Obmet River (a right tributary of the Tuskar in the basin of the Seym), 100 km from the Russia–Ukraine border, 2 km north of the district center – the town Kursk, 5 km from the selsoviet center – Chaplygina.

Climate

Ovsyannikovo has a warm-summer humid continental climate (Dfb in the Köppen climate classification).

== Transport ==
Ovsyannikovo is located 5 km from the federal route M-2 Crimea Highway (a part of the European route E105), 4.5 km from the road of regional importance 38K-018 (Kursk – Ponyri), 1.5 km from the road of intermunicipal significance 38H-379 (Kursk – Iskra), on the road 38H-380 (38N-379 – Ovsyannikovo – Pashkovo), 5 km from the railway junction 530 km (railway line Oryol – Kursk).

The rural locality is situated 11 km from Kursk Vostochny Airport, 133 km from Belgorod International Airport and 209 km from Voronezh Peter the Great Airport.
