= Hunter Drew =

Canadian ice hockey player (born 1998)

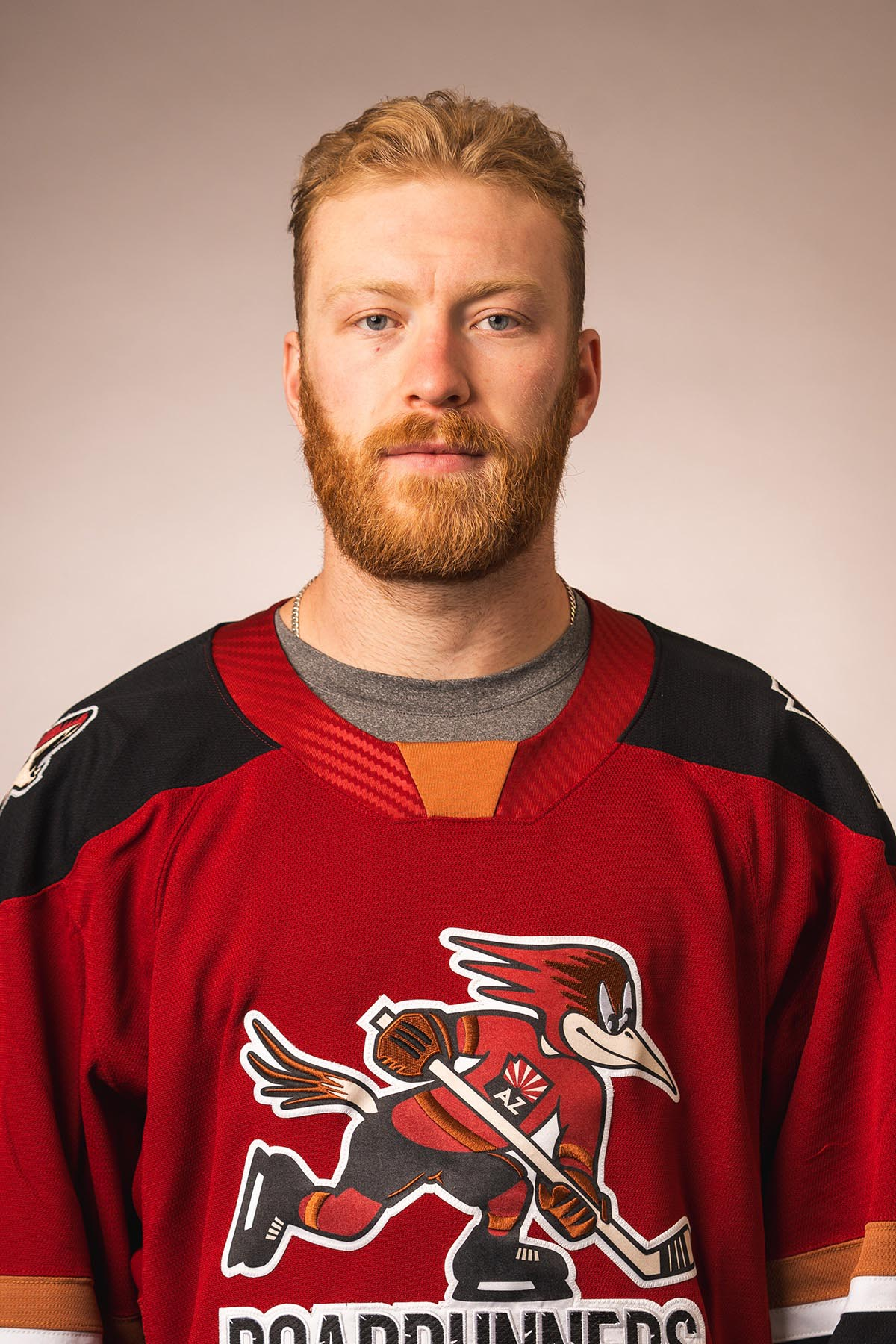
- Drew with the Tucson Roadrunners
- Born: October 21, 1998 (age 28) Kingston, Ontario, Canada
- Height: 6 ft 2 in (188 cm)
- Weight: 213 lb (97 kg; 15 st 3 lb)
- Position: Right wing
- Shoots: Right
- AHL team Former teams: Hamilton Hammers; HC '05 Banská Bystrica; Anaheim Ducks; Bridgeport Islanders
- NHL draft: 178th overall, 2018; Anaheim Ducks
- Playing career: 2019–present

Hunter Drew (born October 21, 1998) is a Canadian professional ice hockey right winger for the Hamilton Hammers of the American Hockey League (AHL). He was selected by the Anaheim Ducks, 178th overall, in the 2018 NHL entry draft.

== Playing career ==
Drew played major junior hockey with the Charlottetown Islanders in the Quebec Major Junior Hockey League (QMJHL) from 2016 to 2019, scoring 92 points in 167 games. He was selected by the Anaheim Ducks of the National Hockey League (NHL) in the sixth round, 178th overall, in the 2018 NHL entry draft. As a defenceman, Drew posted 50 points through 61 regular season games during his final season with the Islanders in 2018–19, earning a one-year contract with the Ducks AHL affiliate, the San Diego Gulls, on August 14, 2019.

In his first professional season in 2019–20, Drew split the season between the Gulls and secondary affiliate, the Tulsa Oilers of the ECHL. He posted two goals and seven points in 29 regular season games with the Gulls before the season was halted due to the COVID-19 pandemic. He was signed to a three-year, entry-level contract with the Anaheim Ducks on March 31, 2020.

With the ongoing pandemic delaying the commencement of the 2020–21 season, Drew opted to continue his development in Europe by signing on loan with the Slovak club HC '05 Banská Bystrica on September 14, 2020. He collected 9 goals and 16 points through 20 games before returning to North America for the Ducks training camp and reassignment to the San Diego Gulls. With the introduction of a taxi squad stretching the Gulls roster, Drew split the shortened season on the blueline and spot filling as a forward.

In showing potential as a forward, Drew switched full-time to the wing entering his third professional season in 2021–22. The positional switch came with instant success, as he responded in showing an offensive touch with the Gulls in finishing second amongst team forwards in scoring with 17 goals and 38 points in 64 regular season games. He was rewarded with his first recall to the Anaheim Ducks at the tail end of the season and made his NHL debut against the San Jose Sharks, and recorded his first NHL fight against Jonah Gadjovich in a 5–2 victory on April 26, 2022. Drew went scoreless with the Ducks over their final two regular season games.

During the 2022–23 season, having played exclusively with the Gulls in posting just 11 points through 44 regular season games, Drew was traded by the Ducks to the Chicago Blackhawks in exchange for Josiah Slavin on February 23, 2023. Drew played out the remainder of his contract with the Blackhawks AHL affiliate, the Rockford IceHogs, going scoreless in 16 appearances.

As a free agent from the Blackhawks, Drew opted to continue his career in the AHL, agreeing to a one-year contract with the Tucson Roadrunners, who are the primary affiliate of the Utah Mammoth, on July 18, 2023.

Drew played with the Roadrunners for two seasons before continuing his journeyman career in signing a one-year deal with the Bridgeport Islanders of the AHL on July 1, 2025.

== Career statistics ==
			Regular season					Playoffs
Season	Team	League	GP	G	A	Pts	PIM	GP	G	A	Pts	PIM
2014–15	Gananoque Islanders	EOJHL	43	5	13	18	72	—	—	—	—	—
2015–16	Gananoque Islanders	EBJCHL	34	6	18	24	81	4	1	1	2	15
2015–16	Kingston Voyageurs	OJHL	10	1	2	3	2	1	0	0	0	0
2016–17	Charlottetown Islanders	QMJHL	42	0	3	3	69	1	0	0	0	2
2017–18	Charlottetown Islanders	QMJHL	64	8	31	39	159	18	2	9	11	30
2018–19	Charlottetown Islanders	QMJHL	61	16	34	50	141	6	0	4	4	19
2019–20	San Diego Gulls	AHL	29	2	5	7	33	—	—	—	—	—
2019–20	Tulsa Oilers	ECHL	5	0	4	4	13	—	—	—	—	—
2020–21	HC '05 Banská Bystrica	Slovak	20	9	7	16	111	—	—	—	—	—
2020–21	San Diego Gulls	AHL	33	6	6	12	29	—	—	—	—	—
2021–22	San Diego Gulls	AHL	64	17	21	38	134	2	1	1	2	6
2021–22	Anaheim Ducks	NHL	2	0	0	0	5	—	—	—	—	—
2022–23	San Diego Gulls	AHL	44	5	6	11	92	—	—	—	—	—
2022–23	Rockford IceHogs	AHL	16	0	0	0	57	—	—	—	—	—
2023–24	Tucson Roadrunners	AHL	37	10	8	18	107	2	1	0	1	2
2024–25	Tucson Roadrunners	AHL	58	15	14	29	134	3	1	0	1	6
2025–26	Bridgeport Islanders	AHL	62	13	11	24	141	—	—	—	—	—
NHL totals			2	0	0	0	5	—	—	—	—	—
