= Andrey Glebov =

Russian Soldier (1770-1854)

Andrey Saviichevich Glebov
- Russian: Андрей Савиичевич Глебов
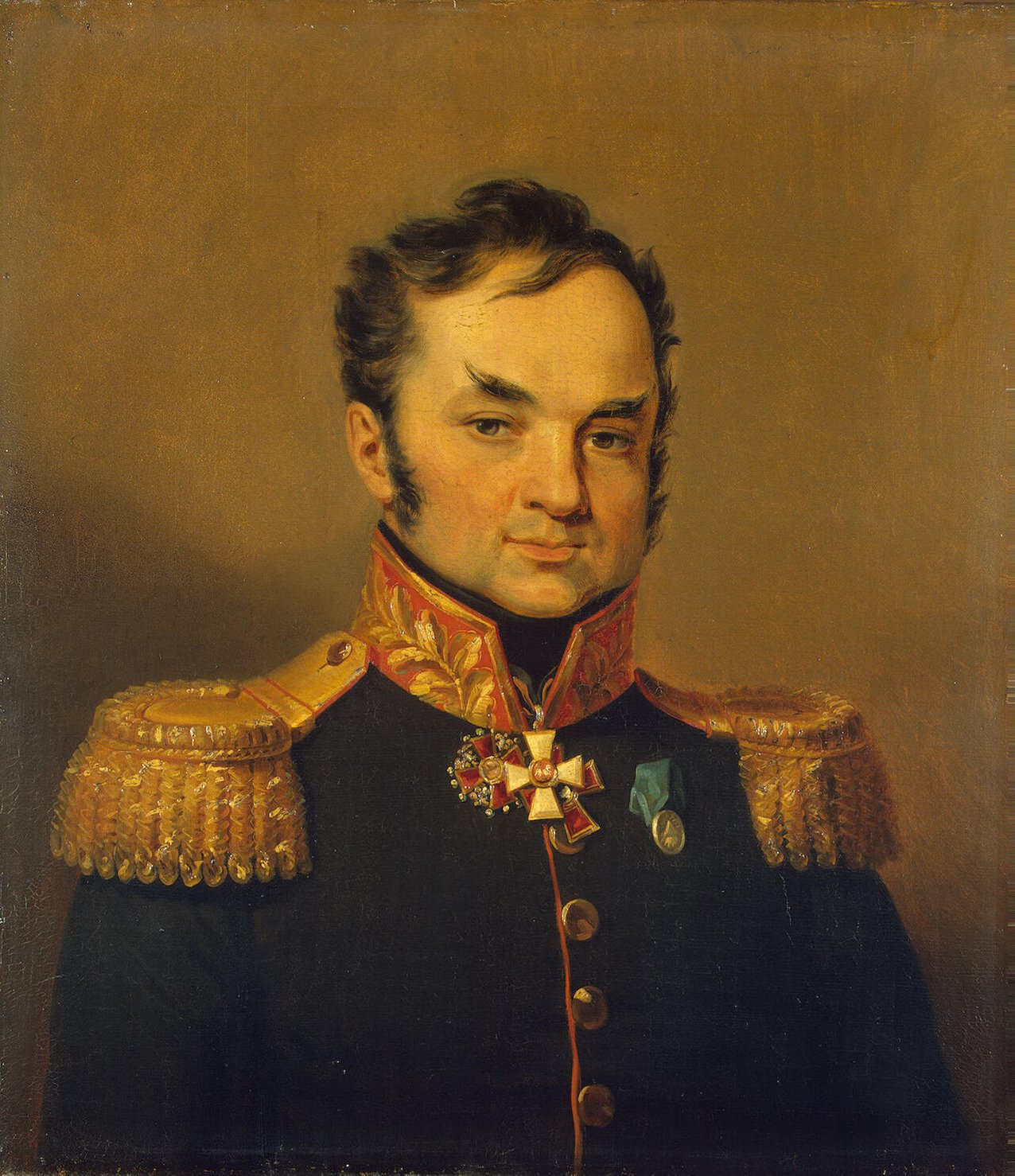
- Portrait of Glebov by George Dawe
- Born: 1770; Berezna, Chernigov Governorate, Russian Empire
- Died: 24 September 1854 (aged 83-84) near Borzna, Chernigov Governorate, Russian Empire
- Military career
- Allegiance: Russian Empire
- Branch: Imperial Russian Army
- Service years: 1790-1816
- Rank: Major general
- Conflicts: Kościuszko Uprising; French Revolutionary Wars; Battle of Marengo; Battle of Trebbia; Battle of Novi; Napoleonic Wars; Battle of Amstetten; Battle of Schöngrabern; Battle of Wischau; Battle of Austerlitz; Battle of Saltanovka; Battle of Borodino; Battle of Maloyaroslavets; Battle of Krasnoi; Battle of Lützen; Battle of Bautzen; Battle of Dresden; Battle of Leipzig; Siege of Hamburg; Battle of Craonne; Battle of Laon
- Awards: Order of St. Vladimir; Order of St. Anna; Order of St. George; Order of St. Andrew; Gold Sword for Bravery

Andrey Saviichevich Glebov (Russian: Андрей Савиичевич Глебов; 1770 in Berezna – 24 September 1854) was a major general of the Russian Empire. He served at numerous fronts and battles during the Italian and Swiss campaigns (1799) as part of the French Revolutionary Wars, and took part in the Napoleonic Wars, including two major battles at Austerlitz and Borodino. During his military career, Glebov suffered numerous wounds and other trauma, but lived on for more than 80 years.

== Career ==
Andrey Glebov was born into a Russian noble family hailing from the Chernigov Governorate. He started serving in the army when he was 20 years old, in Livonia. After having taken service in the 3rd battalion of the Lifland Jager Corps in January 1791, he served in Poland between 1792 and 1794. On 30 July 1797, he was transferred to the 7th (later 6th) Jager Regiment. In the Italian and Swiss campaigns of 1799 which were led by Generalissimo Alexander Suvorov, Glebov distinguished himself in the battles at Brescia (10 April 1799), and at Lecco, which took place on 26–28 April 1799 and during which he became wounded in the left leg. For his deeds in the battle of Lecco, he was awarded the Order of St. Anna, 4th Class. He subsequently continued at Marengo, and on the Tidone and the Trebbia. During the battle of Trebbia, he became wounded in the right leg, and was later promoted to portupei-junker, which is something like an "elite cadet rank" reserved only for military men from the nobility. He continued military action at Novi, where he became wounded in the head. He was promoted to sub-lieutenant on 25 August 1799, and continued fighting at St.Gothard (wounded in the left hand) and Schwanden; in the latter he became wounded in the head and was captured by the French army. He remained in French captivity for two years.

After he was released, he returned to Russia, where he joined the 6th Jager regiment, and became lieutenant on 8 August 1802. Two years later, on 29 October 1804 he became staff captain, and on 31 January 1805, he was promoted to captain. In 1805, he served under Prince Pyotr Bagration and participated at Lambach, Amstetten, Krems, Schöngrabern, Wischau as well as the climactic Battle of Austerlitz, in which he was wounded on his right side, and later received the Order of St. George (4th Class) on 24 April 1806. Between 1806 and 1811, he served with his previous 6th Jager Regiment in the Danubian Principalities. He participated in the battles at Bucharest, Chediroghlu (received the Gold Sword for Bravery), Obilesti (promoted to the rank of major on 23 February 1808) as well as Kladovo, where he was wounded in the right leg and left hand. After having healed from his wounds, he subsequently served at Bartokert, for which he was promoted to lieutenant-colonel on 11 October 1809, Rassevat, Dudu (wounded in the left leg), Vidrovitz (promoted to full colonel on 24 July 1810), Praiova (received the Order of St.Vladimir (4th class) and of St. Anna (2nd class) and lastly at the battle of Bregov.

In 1812, during the War of the Sixth Coalition, Glebov served in the Second Western Army, participating in Pyotr Bagrations retreat from Volkovisk. As the Russians subsequently made their counterattack, they managed to push the French outposts back, reaching the bridge at Saltanovka (present-day Mogilev) at 08:00 AM. Glebov subsequently played an important role at the heavy fighting at Saltanovka, where the Jager corps he led managed to overrun the defenders who were stationed on the bridge, thus enabling the Russian advance. Following the battle at Moghilev, the 2nd Western Army, which Glebov was part of, completed the construction of a bridge at Novy Bukhov, which they used to cross the river, and then continued marching towards Smolensk. Glebov subsequently participated at Smolensk, Shevardino, and the infamous Battle of Borodino, in which he was wounded in the head. After having recovered from his wounds, he took part at Maloyaroslavets and Krasnyi; for the latter he was awarded the Order of St.Vladimir, 3rd class. In 1813 he once again fought at numerous fronts and battles, which comprised Lützen, Bautzen, Modlin, Dresden, Leipzig (awarded Order of St. George (3rd class) and lastly at the siege of Hamburg. In his last years of active service, he once again distinguished himself at Soissons, Craonne, and Laon. Prof. Alexander Mikaberidze adds that regarding the 6th Jager Regiment, of which he was a part of for a long time, he became chef on 12 May 1814, and served up to 1815 as an assistant to the military commander of the 6th division. His last military act was that of taking command of the 1st brigade of the 12th division on 20 March 1816, shortly he retired from military service on 23 September 1816, at the age of 46, after being discharged and being ordered to move to another regiment.

Andrey Glebov died on 24 September 1854 in his farm in the Chernigov Governorate, near the provincial town of Borzna.

== Sources ==
- Fremont-Barnes, Gregory (2006). The encyclopedia of the French revolutionary and Napoleonic Wars: a political, social, and military history, Volume 1. ABC-CLIO. ISBN 978-1851096466.
- McNeal, Robert Hatch (1987). Tsar and Cossack, 1855-1914. Macmillan in assoc. with St. Antony's College, Oxford. ISBN 978-0333373538.
- Mikaberidze, Alexander (2005). Russian Officer Corps of the Revolutionary and Napoleonic Wars. Casemate Publishers. ISBN 978-1611210026.
- Военная галерея Зимнего дворца, pp. 93–96 (in Russian)
- Словарь русских генералов, участников боевых действий против армии Наполеона pp. 359–360 (in Russian)
