= Vinogrobl =

Rural locality in Kursk Oblast, Russia

Vinogrobl Виногробль
- Selo
- Interactive map of Vinogrobl
- Location of Vinogrobl Vinogrobl (Kursk Oblast)
- Coordinates: 51°51′34″N 36°26′31″E
- Country: Russia
- Federal subject: Kursk Oblast
- Administrative district: Kursky District
- SelsovietSelsoviet: Nozdrachevsky

Population (2010 Census)
  - Total: 176
  - Estimate (2010): 176 (0%)

Municipal status
  - Municipal district: Kursky Municipal District
  - Rural settlement: Nozdrachevsky Selsoviet Rural Settlement
- Time zone: UTC+3 (MSK)
- Postal code: 305532
- Dialing code: +7 4712
- OKTMO ID: 38620456106
- Website: nozdrachevo.rkursk.ru

Vinogrobl (Russian: Виногробль) is a rural locality (Russian: село, lit. 'village') in Nozdrachevsky Selsoviet Rural Settlement, Kursky District, Kursk Oblast, Russia. Population: 176 (2010 census); 227 (2002 census);

== Geography ==
The village is located on the Vinogrobl River (a left tributary of the Tuskar in the basin of the Seym), 114 km from the Russia–Ukraine border, 14 km north-east of the district center – the town Kursk, 7 km from the selsoviet center – Nozdrachevo.

Climate

Vinogrobl has a warm-summer humid continental climate (Dfb in the Köppen climate classification).

Climate data for Vinogrobl
Month	Jan	Feb	Mar	Apr	May	Jun	Jul	Aug	Sep	Oct	Nov	Dec	Year
Mean daily maximum °C (°F)	−4.4 (24.1)	−3.5 (25.7)	2.3 (36.1)	12.7 (54.9)	19.2 (66.6)	22.5 (72.5)	25.2 (77.4)	24.5 (76.1)	17.9 (64.2)	10.3 (50.5)	3 (37)	−1.5 (29.3)	10.7 (51.2)
Daily mean °C (°F)	−6.5 (20.3)	−6 (21)	−1.2 (29.8)	7.9 (46.2)	14.5 (58.1)	18.2 (64.8)	20.8 (69.4)	19.8 (67.6)	13.8 (56.8)	7 (45)	0.8 (33.4)	−3.4 (25.9)	7.1 (44.9)
Mean daily minimum °C (°F)	−9.1 (15.6)	−9.1 (15.6)	−5.3 (22.5)	2.4 (36.3)	8.8 (47.8)	12.8 (55.0)	15.7 (60.3)	14.7 (58.5)	9.5 (49.1)	3.7 (38.7)	−1.5 (29.3)	−5.6 (21.9)	3.1 (37.6)
Average precipitation mm (inches)	51 (2.0)	44 (1.7)	46 (1.8)	50 (2.0)	60 (2.4)	69 (2.7)	72 (2.8)	55 (2.2)	60 (2.4)	59 (2.3)	46 (1.8)	49 (1.9)	661 (26)
Source: https://en.climate-data.org/asia/russian-federation/kursk-oblast/виногробль-656068/

== Transport ==
Vinogrobl is located 21 km from the federal route M-2 Crimea Highway (a part of the European route E105), 6.5 km from the road of regional importance 38K-016 (Kursk – Kastornoye), on the road of intermunicipal significance 38H-331 (38K-016 – Nozdrachevo – Vinogrobl), 6 km from the nearest railway halt 18 km (railway line Kursk – 146 km).

The rural locality is situated 15 km from Kursk Vostochny Airport, 134 km from Belgorod International Airport and 192 km from Voronezh Peter the Great Airport.
