= Matthew Highmore =

Canadian ice hockey player (born 1996)

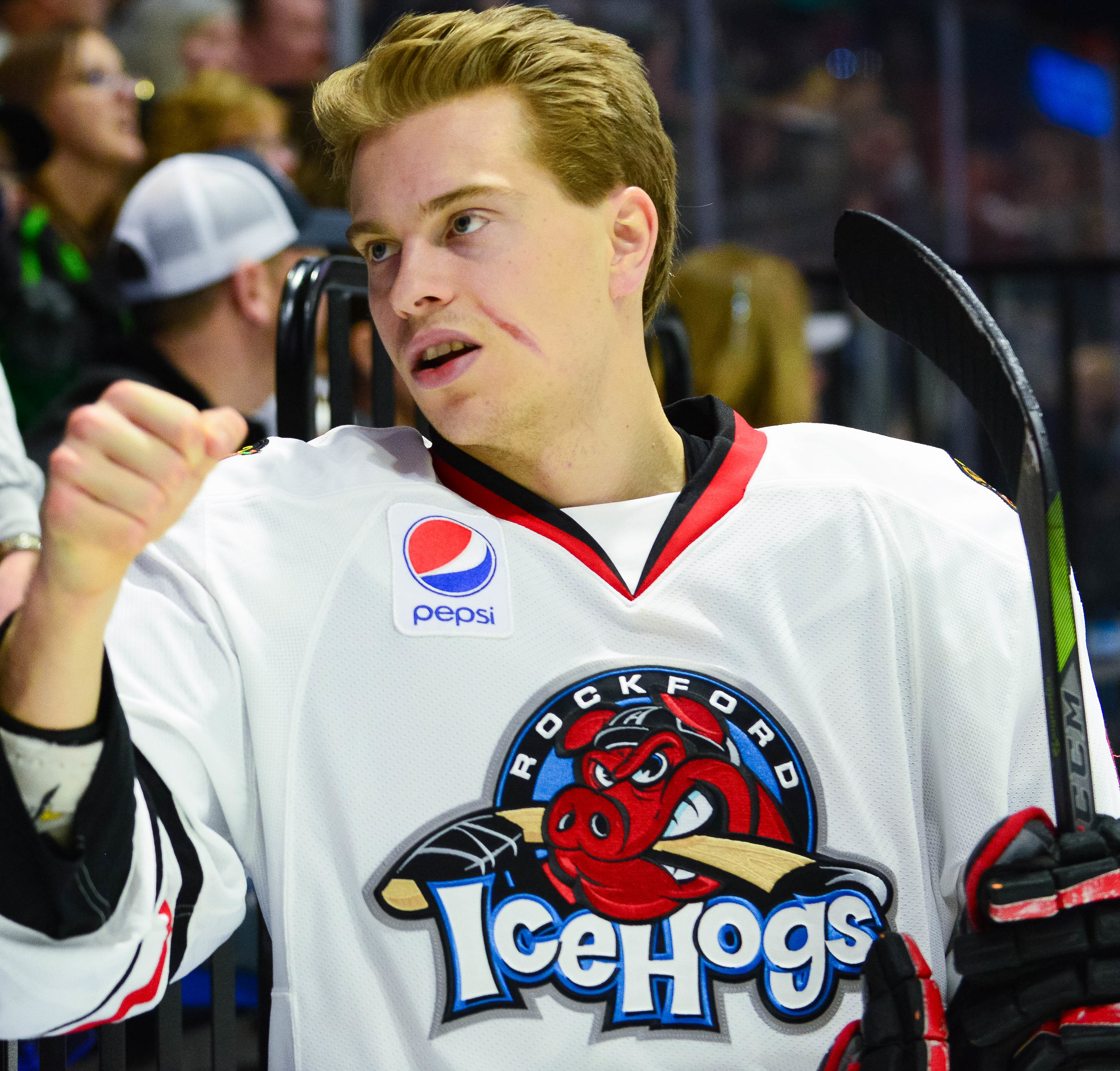
- Highmore with the Rockford IceHogs in 2018
- Born: February 27, 1996 (age 30) Halifax, Nova Scotia, Canada
- Height: 5 ft 11 in (180 cm)
- Weight: 188 lb (85 kg; 13 st 6 lb)
- Position: Forward
- Shoots: Left
- AHL team Former teams: Hamilton Hammers; Chicago Blackhawks; Vancouver Canucks; St. Louis Blues; Ottawa Senators
- NHL draft: Undrafted
- Playing career: 2017–present

Matthew Highmore (born February 27, 1996) is a Canadian professional ice hockey player who is a forward and captain for the Hamilton Hammers of the American Hockey League (AHL). He has previously played in the National Hockey League for the Chicago Blackhawks, Vancouver Canucks, St. Louis Blues, and Ottawa Senators.

== Playing career ==
=== Amateur ===
Highmore was drafted eighth overall by the Saint John Sea Dogs of the Quebec Major Junior Hockey League (QMJHL) in the 2012 QMJHL entry draft. He made his Sea Dogs debut in the following 2012–13 season, missing the first half of the season due to a shoulder injury. In 30 games, he scored four goals and five assists for nine points. The Sea Dogs made the playoffs but were bounced in the first round by the Halifax Mooseheads. In four playoff games, Highmore went scoreless. In his second season with the team in 2013–14, he appeared in 68 games, scoring 19 goals and 50 points. However, his team failed to qualify for the postseason. He was named one of the team's alternate captains during the 2014–15 season. He put up 11 goals and 24 points in 62 games. The Sea Dogs qualified for the postseason and faced the Baie-Comeau Drakkar in the first round. The Drakkar beat the Sea Dogs and in the five games in the series, Highmore recorded one assist.

Highmore led his team in scoring during the 2015–16 season, tallying 22 goals and 75 points in 65 games. The Sea Dogs advanced to the semifinals in the postseason, only to fall to the Shawinigan Cataractes. In 17 playoff games, Highmore registered nine goals and 20 points. At the end of the 2016–17 season, Highmore was named Sea Dogs MVP and was awarded the Pepsi Top Scorer Award for the second year in a row, after netting 34 goals and 89 total points. He finished third in playoff scoring, behind teammate Mathieu Joseph and Alex Barré-Boulet of the Blainville-Boisbriand Armada, which Saint John defeated to win the President's Cup as league champions. They advanced to the 2017 Memorial Cup where, as QMJHL champions, they faced the champions of the Ontario Hockey League (OHL) and Western Hockey League, along with the tournament's host. They lost in the semi-final to the OHL champion Erie Otters.

=== Professional ===
==== Chicago Blackhawks ====
Despite his success in the QMJHL, Highmore was passed over at the National Hockey League's (NHL) entry draft twice, the second time being in his last year of eligibility. However, in his final year with the Saint John Sea Dogs, the Chicago Blackhawks signed him to a three-year NHL contract in March 2017 as an undrafted player. In his last year with the Sea Dogs, he was the only player on the team who earned a professional hockey contract without being drafted.

Highmore started the 2017–18 season with the Blackhawks' American Hockey League (AHL) affiliate, the Rockford IceHogs. He recorded his first professional hat trick against the Iowa Wild on December 27, 2017. After leading his team in points, Highmore was selected to participate in the 2018 AHL All-Star Classic along with teammate Carl Dahlström. On February 24, 2018, Highmore became the first Rockford rookie to score more than 20 goals in their rookie season since Rockford joined the Blackhawks organization in 2007. Highmore was called up to the NHL for the first time on February 26. He made his NHL debut on March 1, in a 7–2 loss to the San Jose Sharks. He had two shots on net in under 13 minutes of ice time. Highmore recorded his first NHL goal in a 4–7 loss to the Boston Bruins on March 10. He was reassigned to the AHL on March 27, after playing in 13 games and recording two points. On April 13, Highmore was named the IceHogs Rookie of the Year after he was tied for the team lead with 42 points and ranked fourth among rookies in the league in goals. During the last regular season game before the 2018 Calder Cup playoffs, Highmore set a new IceHogs rookie goal record with his 24th goal of the season. The IceHogs advanced to the Western Conference finals for the first time in franchise history, but were eliminated by the Texas Stars. In 13 playoff games, Highmore added two goals and nine points.

While attending the Blackhawks training camp prior to the 2018–19 season, Highmore was reassigned to the IceHogs on September 26, 2018, to begin the season in the AHL. He was later named an alternate captain for the IceHogs in October. On November 13, Highmore underwent surgery to repair his right shoulder and was expected to need four to six months to recover. In 12 games, he recorded three goals and nine points. After rehabilitating, Highmore spent the summer training in Halifax, Nova Scotia, with other NHL and AHL players.

Highmore attended the Blackhawks training camp prior to the 2019–20 season but was reassigned to the IceHogs. He was subsequently named an alternate captain alongside Jacob Nilsson and Tyler Sikura. After recording four goals and six assists in 17 games, Highmore was recalled to the NHL on November 26. In 36 games with Chicago, he recorded two goals and six points before the NHL suspended the season due to the COVID-19 pandemic on March 12, 2020. When play resumed, Highmore recorded three goals and one assist during the Blackhawks' play-in and playoff run during the 2019–20 NHL playoff bubble. However, in the pandemic-shortened 2020–21 season Highmore was limited to just 24 games, recording two assists, as the Blackhawks had a glut of players with a similar skillsets as Highmore, rotating them through the fourth line.

==== Vancouver Canucks and St. Louis Blues ====
On April 12, 2021, Highmore was traded from the Blackhawks to the Vancouver Canucks in exchange for forward Adam Gaudette. He played his first game for the Canucks on April 20. He made his Canucks debut in a 6–3 victory over the Toronto Maple Leafs on April 20, and scored his first goal for the Canucks in a 4–1 loss to the Calgary Flames on May 14. On May 15, he scored two goals in a 4–1 victory over the Edmonton Oilers. He finished the season with three goals and five points in 18 games with the Canucks. During the 2021–22 season Highmore played in 46 games, registering five goals and 12 points. Following the season Highmore was a restricted free agent, but the Canucks declined to give him a qualifying offer, letting him become an unrestricted free agent.

The St. Louis Blues signed Highmore to a one-year, two-way contract on July 14, 2022. Highmore began the season with the Blues' AHL affiliate, the Springfield Falcons. In January 2023, on the basis of his excellent play with Springfield, Highmore was named to the 2023 AHL All-Star Game. He was leading the team in scoring when he was recalled by the Blues on February 18, 2023. He played his first game with the Blues against the Ottawa Senators on February 19. He played in one more game before he was returned to Springfield on February 23, going scoreless. In 68 games with Springfield, he tallied 19 goals and 61 points. The Falcons made the 2023 Calder Cup playoffs but were eliminated by the Hartford Wolf Pack in the first round. In two playoff games, Highmore went scoreless.

==== Ottawa Senators ====
As a free agent, Highmore signed a one-year, two-way contract with the Ottawa Senators on July 1, 2023. Highmore attended the Senators training camp, but failed to make the team. He was placed on waivers on October 2, and after going unclaimed, was assigned to Ottawa's AHL affiliate, the Belleville Senators. He was recalled by Ottawa on November 9 and made his Ottawa debut that night versus Vancouver. He appeared in six games, registering one point, before being returned to the AHL on December 3. He was recalled again on March 6, 2024. He had nine goals and 29 points in 40 games with Belleville. He played in the following game versus the Anaheim Ducks, registering an assist on the team's first goal. However, Highmore suffered an injury after being checked by Ross Johnston and left the game early. He missed the next two games and was placed on injured reserve with an upper body injury by Ottawa on March 11. On April 14, he was activated off injured reserve and sent to Belleville. In 43 games with Belleville, he scored nine goals and 31 points. Belleville advanced to the second round of the 2024 Calder Cup playoffs, but were bounced by the Cleveland Monsters to end their season. In seven playoff games, Highmore went scoreless.

Highmore signed a one-year, two-way extension with Ottawa on June 27, 2024. Highmore was injured in training camp and began the season on Ottawa's injured list, before recovering and after clearing waivers, was assigned to Belleville in October. Ottawa recalled Highmore on January 10, 2025, and he made his 2024–25 NHL season debut against the Pittsburgh Penguins on January 11. He scored his first goal for Ottawa in the following game against the Dallas Stars on January 12. With the Senators, Highmore was used in a defensive checking role. The Senators qualified for the playoffs and Highmore made his NHL playoff debut on April 20 in game 1 of the opening round versus the Toronto Maple Leafs. He was replaced in the lineup by Nick Cousins beginning in Game 2, as the Senators were eliminated by the Maple Leafs in six games in their best-of-seven series.

==== New York Islanders ====
Having left the Senators as a free agent, Highmore signed a one-year, two-way contract with the New York Islanders for the 2025–26 season on July 1, 2025. He attended New York's training camp, but failed to make the team and after clearing waivers, was assigned to Islanders' AHL affiliate, the Bridgeport Islanders, on October 1. He was recalled by New York on October 23, alongside Marshall Warren. However, he never played for the Islanders and was returned to the AHL. In 70 games with Bridgeport, he scored 15 goals and 40 points. Bridgeport qualified for the 2026 Calder Cup playoffs, but were eliminated by the Hershey Bears in the first round. In the two games in the series, Highmore went scoreless.

On June 2, 2026, Highmore was signed to a two-year AHL contract by the Hamilton Hammers, the new AHL affiliate of the New York Islanders.

== Personal life ==
Highmore attended Maritime Varsity Academy, a school that focused on athletics, from 2008 to 2010.

== Career statistics ==
=== Regular season and playoffs ===
			Regular season					Playoffs
Season	Team	League	GP	G	A	Pts	PIM	GP	G	A	Pts	PIM
2012–13	Saint John Sea Dogs	QMJHL	30	4	5	9	26	—	—	—	—	—
2013–14	Saint John Sea Dogs	QMJHL	68	19	31	50	62	—	—	—	—	—
2014–15	Saint John Sea Dogs	QMJHL	62	11	13	24	60	5	0	1	1	6
2015–16	Saint John Sea Dogs	QMJHL	65	22	53	75	38	17	9	11	20	12
2016–17	Saint John Sea Dogs	QMJHL	64	34	55	89	46	18	6	18	24	14
2017–18	Rockford IceHogs	AHL	64	24	19	43	24	13	2	7	9	2
2017–18	Chicago Blackhawks	NHL	13	2	0	2	0	—	—	—	—	—
2018–19	Rockford IceHogs	AHL	12	3	6	9	6	—	—	—	—	—
2019–20	Rockford IceHogs	AHL	21	4	8	12	14	—	—	—	—	—
2019–20	Chicago Blackhawks	NHL	36	2	4	6	6	9	3	1	4	2
2020–21	Chicago Blackhawks	NHL	24	0	2	2	6	—	—	—	—	—
2020–21	Vancouver Canucks	NHL	18	3	2	5	2	—	—	—	—	—
2021–22	Vancouver Canucks	NHL	46	5	7	12	14	—	—	—	—	—
2022–23	Springfield Thunderbirds	AHL	68	19	42	61	34	2	0	0	0	2
2022–23	St. Louis Blues	NHL	2	0	0	0	0	—	—	—	—	—
2023–24	Belleville Senators	AHL	43	9	22	31	10	7	0	0	0	4
2023–24	Ottawa Senators	NHL	7	0	2	2	0	—	—	—	—	—
2024–25	Belleville Senators	AHL	23	2	8	10	0	—	—	—	—	—
2024–25	Ottawa Senators	NHL	41	2	4	6	10	1	0	0	0	4
2025–26	Bridgeport Islanders	AHL	70	15	25	40	24	2	0	0	0	2
NHL totals			187	14	21	35	38	10	3	1	4	6

=== International ===
Year	Team	Event	Result	GP	G	A	Pts	PIM
2013	Canada Atlantic	U17	8th	5	1	3	4	4
Junior totals				5	1	3	4	4
