= Hamilton Hammers =

American Hockey League team in Hamilton, Ontario

- City: Hamilton, Ontario
- League: American Hockey League
- Conference: Eastern
- Division: North
- Founded: 2001
- Home arena: TD Coliseum
- Colours: Blue, orange, white
- Owner: Jon Ledecky
- General manager: Evan Gold
- Head coach: Jay McKee
- Captain: Matthew Highmore
- Media: Cable 14; AHL.TV
- Affiliates: New York Islanders (NHL); Trenton Ironhawks (ECHL)

Franchise history
- 2001–2021: Bridgeport Sound Tigers
- 2021–2026: Bridgeport Islanders
- 2026–present: Hamilton Hammers

Championships
- Regular season titles: 0
- Division titles: 0
- Conference titles: 0
- Calder Cups: 0

The Hamilton Hammers are a professional ice hockey team based in Hamilton, Ontario. They are the American Hockey League (AHL) affiliate of the National Hockey League's New York Islanders, who own the franchise. The team was created after the relocation of the Bridgeport Islanders to Hamilton for the 2026–27 season. The Hammers play their home games at TD Coliseum.

== History ==
The Hammers trace their history to the Bridgeport Sound Tigers, who joined the American Hockey League (AHL) as an expansion franchise in 2001.

The Bridgeport Islanders team relocated to Hamilton, Ontario, for the 2026–27 season, and play at the renovated TD Coliseum, following unanimous approval by the AHL Board of Governors.

Jay McKee was named as head coach on May 29, 2026. On June 18, Vince Laise was brought in as assistant coach, and Kain Tisi as goalie coach.

On June 1, 2026, the Hammers signed their first player, forward Matthew Highmore, to a two-year contract.

The Hamilton Hammers played their first regular-season home game at TD Coliseum on October 9, 2026 in a 5-4 shootout loss to the Toronto Marlies.. The team's first win on home ice came on October 30 in a 5–4 overtime win against the Hartford Wolf Pack.

== Team identity ==
=== Name, logo and colours ===
On May 21, 2026, the Hamilton Hammers name, logo and colours were officially unveiled. The name and logo is a reference to Hamilton's heritage as a major steel production city, and the colour scheme is that of the Islanders.

== Players ==
=== Current roster ===
Updated October 6, 2026.

No.	Nat	Player	Pos	S/G	Age	Acquired	Birthplace	Contract
7	(Canada)	Kashawn Aitcheson	D	L	20	2026	Scarborough, Ontario	Islanders
49	(Canada)	Ethan Bear	D	R	29	2026	Regina, Saskatchewan	Islanders
14	(United States)	Cameron Berg	C	L	24	2026	West Fargo, North Dakota	Hammers
26	(United States)	Mitchell Chaffee	RW	R	28	2026	Grand Rapids, Michigan	Islanders
36	(Canada)	Hunter Drew	RW	R	28	2025	Kingston, Ontario	Hammers
34	(United States)	Cole Eiserman	LW	L	20	2026	Newburyport, Massachusetts	Islanders
18	(Sweden)	Pierre Engvall	LW	L	30	2026	Ljungby, Sweden	Islanders
12	(United States)	Quinn Finley	LW	L	22	2026	Valparaiso, Indiana	Islanders
8	(Canada)	Liam Foudy	C	L	26	2026	Scarborough, Ontario	Islanders
4	(Canada)	Isaiah George	D	L	22	2026	Oakville, Ontario	Islanders
29	(United States)	Ryan Healey	D	R	22	2026	Chicago, Illinois	Hammers
20	(Canada)	Matthew Highmore (C)	C	L	30	2026	Halifax, Nova Scotia	Hammers
16	(United States)	Alex Jefferies	LW	R	24	2026	Framingham, Massachusetts	Islanders
32	(Canada)	Joshua Kotai	G	R	23	2026	Abbotsford, British Columbia	Islanders
11	(Canada)	Daylan Kuefler (A)	LW	L	24	2026	Red Deer, Alberta	Islanders
17	(United States)	Joey Larson	RW	R	25	2026	Brighton, Michigan	Islanders
39	(Canada)	Matt Luff	RW	R	29	2026	Georgetown, Ontario	Islanders
2	(Sweden)	Calle Odelius	D	L	22	2026	Nykvarn, Sweden	Islanders
76	(Russia)	Daniil Prokhorov	RW	L	19	2026	Krasnodar, Russia	Islanders
24	(United States)	Luke Rowe	D	R	28	2026	Roxbury, New Jersey	Hammers
48	(Canada)	Brandon Scanlin	D	L	27	2026	Hamilton, Ontario	Hammers
15	(United States)	Cam Thiesing	C	R	25	2026	Franklin, Tennessee	Hammers
41	(Czech Republic)	Vítek Vaněček	G	L	30	2026	Havlíčkův Brod, Czech Republic	Islanders
28	(United States)	Gleb Veremyev	C	L	23	2026	Monroe Township, New Jersey	Islanders
6	(United States)	Marshall Warren	D	L	25	2026	Laurel Hollow, New York	Islanders

=== Team captains ===
- Matthew Highmore, 2026–present

== Staff ==
Name	Nat.	Title	Years
Jay McKee	Canada	Head coach	2026
Vince Laise	Canada	Assistant coach	2026
Kain Tisi	Canada	Goaltending coach	2026

== See also ==
- List of ice hockey teams in Ontario
