= Hlib =

Hlib (Ukrainian: Гліб, IPA: [ɦlib])) is a Ukrainian male given name. The Russian equivalent is Gleb. Notable people with the name include:

- Hlib Bukhal (born 1995), Ukrainian footballer
- Hlib Hrachov (born 1997), Ukrainian footballer
- Hlib Lonchyna (born 1954), Ukrainian bishop
- Hlib Piskunov (born 1998), Ukrainian hammer thrower
- Hlib Savchuk (born 2003), Ukrainian footballer

== Surname ==
- Paweł Hlib (born 1986), Polish motorcycle speedway rider
