= Denisovo, Ustyuzhensky District, Vologda Oblast =

Denisovo Денисово
- Village
- Location within Vologda Oblast Location within Russia
- Coordinates: 58°43′N 36°03′E
- Country: Russia
- Region: Vologda Oblast
- District: Ustyuzhensky District
- Time zone: UTC+3:00

Denisovo (Russian: Денисово) is a rural locality (a village) in Zalesskoye Rural Settlement, Ustyuzhensky District, Vologda Oblast, Russia. The population was 2 as of 2002.

== Geography ==
Denisovo is located 39 km (24 mi) southwest of Ustyuzhna (the district's administrative centre) by road. Lukhnevo is the nearest rural locality.
