= Denisovo, Gorokhovetsky District, Vladimir Oblast =

Denisovo Денисово
- Village
- Location within Vladimir Oblast Location within Russia
- Coordinates: 56°05′N 42°20′E
- Country: Russia
- Region: Vladimir Oblast
- District: Gorokhovetsky District
- Time zone: UTC+3:00

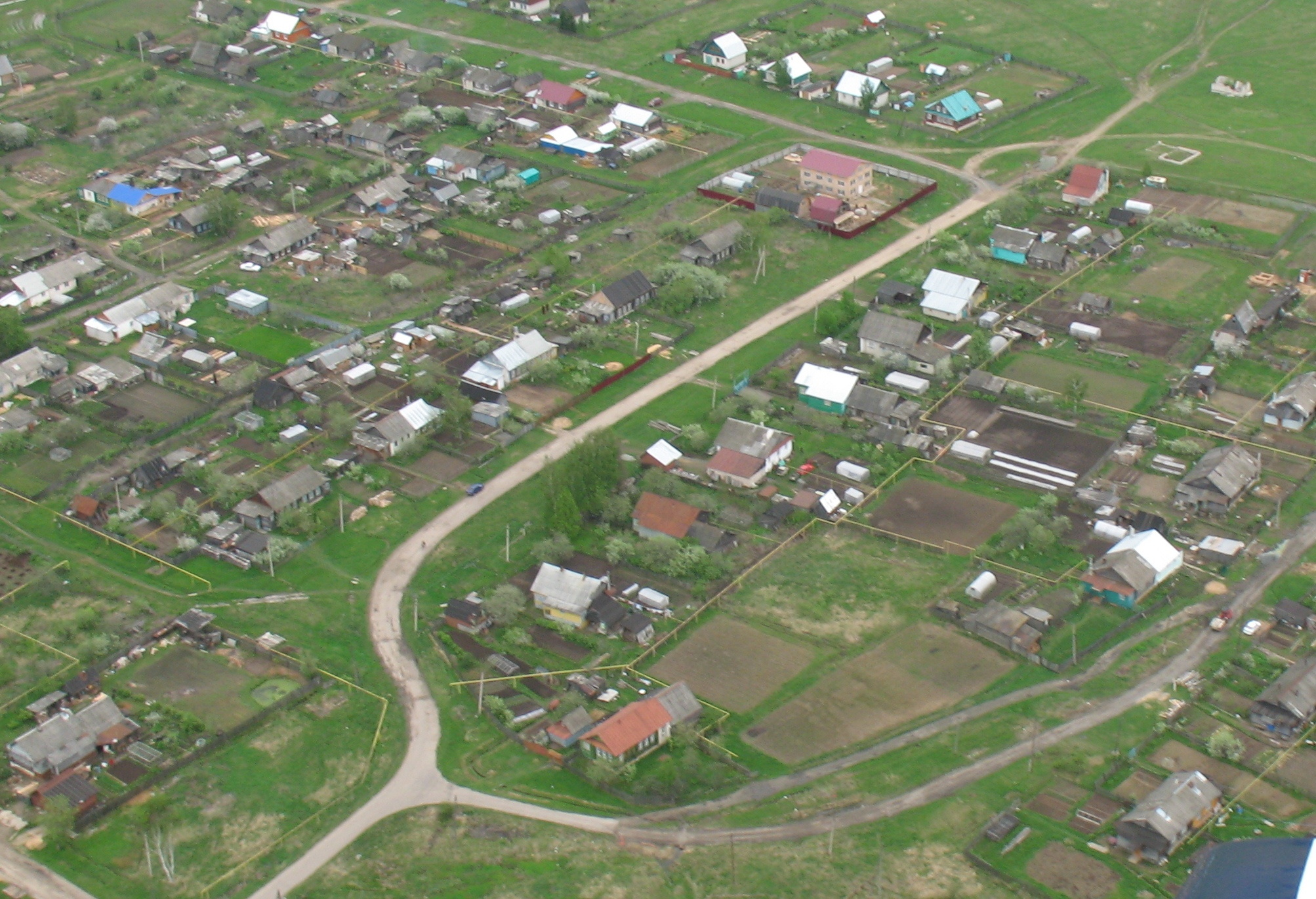
Denisovo Village, Shkolnaya St.

Denisovo (Russian: Денисово) is a rural locality (a village) in Denisovskoye Rural Settlement, Gorokhovetsky District, Vladimir Oblast, Russia. The population was 34 as of 2010.

== Geography ==
Denisovo is located 30 km southwest of Gorokhovets (the district's administrative centre) by road. Lesnoye-Tatarintsevo is the nearest rural locality.
