= Denisovo, Petushinsky District, Vladimir Oblast =

Denisovo Денисово
- Village
- Location within Vladimir Oblast Location within Russia
- Coordinates: 56°03′N 39°42′E
- Country: Russia
- Region: Vladimir Oblast
- District: Petushinsky District
- Time zone: UTC+3:00

Denisovo (Russian: Денисово) is a rural locality (a village) in Pekshinskoye Rural Settlement, Petushinsky District, Vladimir Oblast, Russia. The population was 14 as of 2010.

== Geography ==
Denisovo is located on the Nergel River, 34 km northeast of Petushki (the district's administrative centre) by road. Pakhomovo is the nearest rural locality.
