= Denisovo, Selivanovsky District, Vladimir Oblast =

Denisovo Денисово
- Village
- Location within Vladimir Oblast Location within Russia
- Coordinates: 55°55′N 41°32′E
- Country: Russia
- Region: Vladimir Oblast
- District: Selivanovsky District
- Time zone: UTC+3:00

Denisovo (Russian: Денисово) is a rural locality (a village) in Volosatovskoye Rural Settlement, Selivanovsky District, Vladimir Oblast, Russia. The population was 8 as of 2010.

== Geography ==
Denisovo is located 15 km northwest of Krasnaya Gorbatka (the district's administrative centre) by road. Matveyevka is the nearest rural locality.
