= Gleb Veremyev =

American ice hockey player (born 2003)

- Born: June 28, 2003 (age 23) Monroe Township, New Jersey, U.S.
- Height: 6 ft 5 in (196 cm)
- Weight: 218 lb (99 kg; 15 st 8 lb)
- Position: Center
- Shoots: Left
- NHL team (P) Cur. team: New York Islanders; Hamilton Hammers (AHL)
- NHL draft: Undrafted
- Playing career: 2025–present

Gleb Veremyev (born June 28, 2003) is an American professional ice hockey player who is a center for the Hamilton Hammers of the American Hockey League (AHL) while under contract to the New York Islanders of the National Hockey League (NHL).

== Playing career ==
=== Collegiate ===
In 2019, while playing in high school, Veremyev verbally committed to play hockey at Penn State. However, after parts of three seasons of playing in the United States Hockey League (USHL) with the Lincoln Stars, Veremyev instead decided to play college hockey at Colorado College Tigers starting with the 2022–23 season.

In his first season with the Tigers, Veremyev scored two goals and five assists in fourteen games, missing most of the season due to injury. Despite a poor 13-22-3 record, the Tigers would advance to the finals of the 2023 NCHC Tournament with an upset over first-seeded Denver, where they would fall to the St. Cloud State Huskies.

Coming off of injury, Veremyev saw increased action in the 2023–24 season, and with it, increased production. He would score 15 goals and 13 assists in 37 games, helping lead the Tigers to a much improved 21–13–3 record, setting them up well for a bid in the 2024 NCAA tournament. However, they would fall in three games in the first round of the 2024 NCHC Tournament to Omaha, which would prove detrimental to their chances, as they were ranked .0004 points behind Massachusetts and get left out of the tournament. Veremyev would have a goal and an assist in the series against the Mavericks. Over the off-season, Veremyev attended Boston Bruins professional development camp, but did not sign a contract with the team.

Veremyev returned to the Tigers for the 2024–25 season, however, the season wouldn't be as successful for Veremyev or the team as the previous season. In 37 games, Veremyev registered nine goals and eight assists. This included the first round of the 2025 NCHC Tournament against Denver, a three-game stretch where the Tigers were outscored 16–8, and Veremyev was held to a sole assist. The early exit in the tournament all but assured that the Tigers would once again miss the NCAA tournament, and left Veremyev's collegiate career uncertain.

=== Professional ===
Throughout his junior season with the Tigers, there was much speculation where Veremyev, who was eligible to sign with an NHL team at season's end, would sign. His size made him an attractive target for many teams looking for a big body on the wing, and he was seen as one of the top collegiate free agents available to be signed.On March 21, 2025, Veremyev officially concluded his collegiate career by signing a two-year, entry-level contract with the New York Islanders.

Veremyev was named to the Bridgeport Islanders, the Islanders American Hockey League (AHL) affiliate, opening night's roster. However, after struggling offensively with Bridgeport, scoring only three goals and an assists in 22 games, Veremyev was sent to the team's ECHL affiliate, the Worcester Railers, spending most of the rest of the season there. With Worcester, Veremyev scored six goals and 10 assists in 36 games.

== Personal life ==
Veremyev is of Russian descent, with both of his parents immigrating from there before his birth. As such, he is fluent in both Russian and English.

== Career statistics ==
			Regular season					Playoffs
Season	Team	League	GP	G	A	Pts	PIM	GP	G	A	Pts	PIM
2019–20	Lincoln Stars	USHL	1	0	0	0	2	—	—	—	—	—
2020–21	Lincoln Stars	USHL	43	5	8	13	120	—	—	—	—	—
2021–22	Lincoln Stars	USHL	56	16	12	28	133	3	0	2	2	0
2022–23	Colorado College	NCHC	14	2	5	7	18	—	—	—	—	—
2023–24	Colorado College	NCHC	37	15	13	28	55	—	—	—	—	—
2024–25	Colorado College	NCHC	37	9	8	17	50	—	—	—	—	—
2024–25	Bridgeport Islanders	AHL	10	0	1	1	9	—	—	—	—	—
2025–26	Worcester Railers	ECHL	36	6	10	16	23	—	—	—	—	—
2025–26	Bridgeport Islanders	AHL	22	3	1	4	13	—	—	—	—	—
AHL totals			32	3	2	5	22	—	—	—	—	—
