= Glebovo, Vladimir Oblast =

Glebovo Глебово
- Village
- Location within Vladimir Oblast Location within Russia
- Coordinates: 56°25′N 41°27′E
- Country: Russia
- Region: Vladimir Oblast
- District: Kovrovsky District
- Time zone: UTC+3:00

Glebovo (Russian: Глебово) is a rural locality (a village) in Klyazminskoye Rural Settlement, Kovrovsky District, Vladimir Oblast, Russia. The population was 381 as of 2010. There are 6 streets.

== Geography ==
Glebovo is located on the Klyazma River, 13 km northeast of Kovrov (the district's administrative centre) by road. Golyshevo is the nearest rural locality.
