= Battle of Wischau =

1805 battle during the War of the Third Coalition

- Part of the War of the Third Coalition
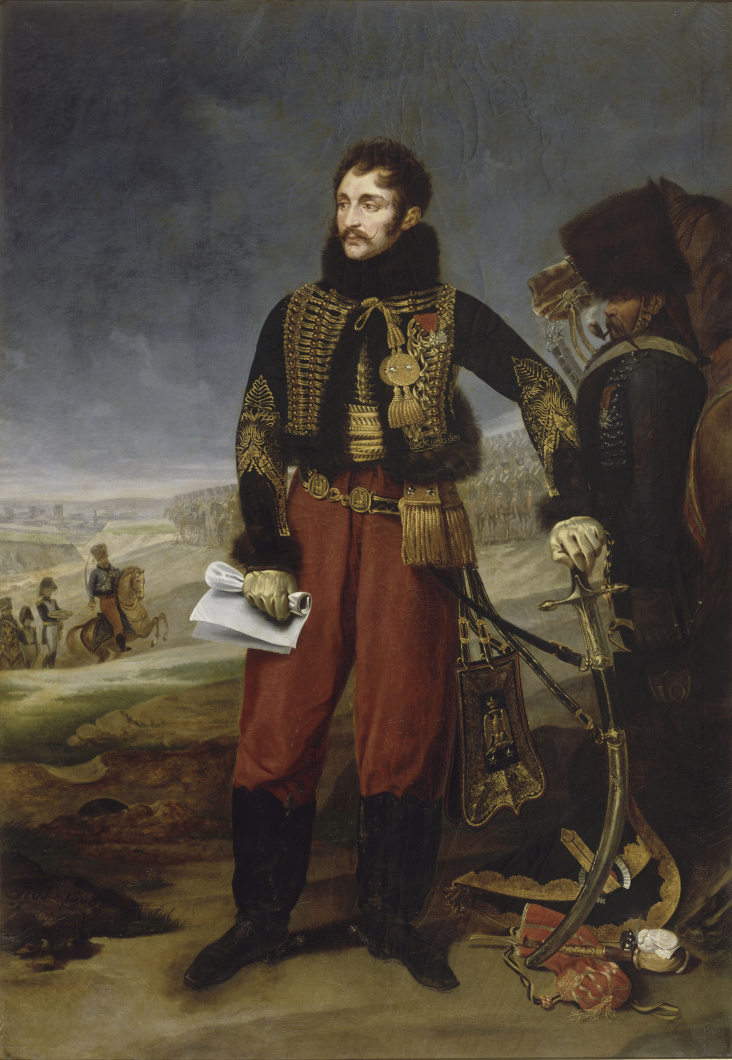
- General Lasalle at the Siege of Stettin by Antoine-Jean Gros (1808)
Date	28 November 1805
Location	Wischau, Moravia, present-day Czech Republic 49°16′39″N 16°59′56″E
Result	Russian victory

Belligerents
(France) French Empire	(Russia) Russian Empire

Commanders and leaders
Frédéric Henri Walther Antoine Charles Louis de Lasalle	Prince Pyotr Bagration

Strength
1,400	24,000

Casualties and losses
Unclear, Imperial Eagle and Guidon (11th Dragoons)	Unclear

War of the Third Coalition:
Austria
current battle
Napoleon in command
Napoleon not in command

The Battle of Wischau occurred on 28 November 1805 between the Russian and French armies. The conflict resulted in a minor Russian success. It followed the action at Hollabrun and Schöngrabern, and preceded the Battle of Austerlitz. The relatively easy Russian victory convinced the Third Coalition Allies that the French army would be easy to beat, having reached the end of their supply and communication lines and having suffered several losses in previous weeks of fighting.

== Orders of Battle ==
=== French forces ===
- General of Division Frédéric Henri Walther
  - Division of Reserve Cavalry
- General of Division Antoine Charles Louis de Lasalle
  - Division of Lannes' V Corps
    - 6th and 11th Dragoons (4 squadrons each)
    - 9th and 10th Hussar Regiments (4 squadrons each), and
    - 22nd Chasseurs Chevalier (4 squadrons)
    - 12 guns

Total: 20 squadrons, 12 guns, approximately 1400 men.

11th Dragoons lost an Imperial Eagle and a guidon during the fight.

=== Russian forces ===
Advanced Guard

- Lieutenant General Bagration commanding
  - Major Generals Dolgoruky, Ulanius, and Tschaplitz
    - 6th Jägers (3 battalions)
    - 9 battalions of the Infantry Regiments Alt-Ingermannland, Archangel, and Pskov
    - Leib Kür Regiment (4 squadrons)
    - Dragoon Regiment Twer (5 squadrons)
    - Dragoon Regiment St. Petersburg (5 squadrons)
    - Hussar Regiment Pavlograd (10 Squadrons
    - Hussar Regiment Mariupol (10 squadrons)
    - Cossacks (8 sotnia)
    - 24 guns

Total: 12 battalions, 35 squadrons, and 8 sotnias, 24 guns, approximately 12,000 men.

== Sources ==
- Digby Smith. The Greenhill Napoleonic Wars Databook. London, Greenhill Books, 1998, p. 215.
