= Glebovo, Vologda Oblast =

Glebovo Глебово
- Village
- Location within Vologda Oblast Location within Russia
- Coordinates: 59°39′N 40°34′E
- Country: Russia
- Region: Vologda Oblast
- District: Sokolsky District
- Time zone: UTC+3:00

Glebovo (Russian: Глебово) is a rural locality (a village) in Dvinitskoye Rural Settlement, Sokolsky District, Vologda Oblast, Russia. The population was 19 as of 2002.

== Geography ==
Glebovo is located 46 km northeast of Sokol (the district's administrative centre) by road. Knyazhevo is the nearest rural locality.
