= Ovsyannikovo, Babayevsky District, Vologda Oblast =

Ovsyannikovo Овсянниково
- Village
- Location within Vologda Oblast Location within Russia
- Coordinates: 59°46′N 36°00′E
- Country: Russia
- Region: Vologda Oblast
- District: Babayevsky District
- Time zone: UTC+3:00

Ovsyannikovo (Russian: Овся́нниково) is a rural locality (a village) in Babayevsky District, Vologda Oblast, Russia. Population: 5 (2010 census); 10 (2002 census);
