= Ovsyannikovo, Sudogodsky District, Vladimir Oblast =

Ovsyannikovo Овсянниково
- Village
- Location within Vladimir Oblast Location within Russia
- Coordinates: 55°57′N 40°29′E
- Country: Russia
- Region: Vladimir Oblast
- District: Sudogodsky District
- Time zone: UTC+3:00

Ovsyannikovo (Russian: Овсянниково) is a rural locality (a village) in Golovinskoye Rural Settlement, Sudogodsky District, Vladimir Oblast, Russia. The population was 104 as of 2010. Today, its population is 103.

== Geography ==
It is located 3 km east from Golovino, 27 km west from Sudogda.
