= Ovsyannikovo, Kovrovsky District, Vladimir Oblast =

Ovsyannikovo Овсянниково
- Village
- Location within Vladimir Oblast Location within Russia
- Coordinates: 56°26′N 41°44′E
- Country: Russia
- Region: Vladimir Oblast
- District: Kovrovsky District
- Time zone: UTC+3:00

Ovsyannikovo (Russian: Овсянниково) is a rural locality (a village) in Klyazminskoye Rural Settlement, Kovrovsky District, Vladimir Oblast, Russia. The population was 2 as of 2010.

== Geography ==
Ovsyannikovo is located 34 km east of Kovrov (the district's administrative centre) by road. Prudishchi is the nearest rural locality.
