= Gleb Boglayevskiy =

Russian footballer

Personal information
- Full name: Gleb Andreyevich Boglayevskiy
- Date of birth: 4 July 1986 (age 40)
- Place of birth: Perm, Russian SFSR
- Height: 1.73 m (5 ft 8 in)
- Position: Striker

Youth career
- Football SDYuSShOR Perm

Senior career*
| Years | Team | Apps | (Gls) |
| 2004–2006 | FC Amkar Perm | 0 | (0) |
| 2006 | FC Lada Togliatti | 1 | (0) |
| 2007 | FC Alnas Almetyevsk | 9 | (0) |
| 2007–2010 | FC Oktan Perm (amateur) | | |
| 2011–2012 | FC Oktan Perm | 38 | (4) |
| 2012–2013 | FC Gubkin | 7 | (0) |
- * Club domestic league appearances and goals

Gleb Andreyevich Boglayevskiy (Russian: Глеб Андреевич Боглаевский; born 4 July 1986) is a former Russian football striker.

== Club career ==
He made his senior debut for FC Amkar Perm on 6 July 2005 in the Russian Cup game against FC Lada Togliatti.

He made his debut in the Russian Football National League for FC Lada Togliatti on 17 August 2006 in a game against FC Ural Yekaterinburg.
