= Ovsyannikovo, Kichmengsko-Gorodetsky District, Vologda Oblast =

Ovsyannikovo Овсянниково
- Village
- Location within Vologda Oblast Location within Russia
- Coordinates: 60°08′N 45°17′E
- Country: Russia
- Region: Vologda Oblast
- District: Kichmengsko-Gorodetsky District
- Time zone: UTC+3:00

Ovsyannikovo (Russian: Овсянниково) is a rural locality (a village) in Gorodetskoye Rural Settlement, Kichmengsko-Gorodetsky District, Vologda Oblast, Russia. The population was 92 as of 2002. There are 3 streets.

== Geography ==
Ovsyannikovo is located 42 km northwest of Kichmengsky Gorodok (the district's administrative centre) by road. Sarayevo is the nearest rural locality.
