= Gleb Lapitsky =

Belarusian politician (born 1988)

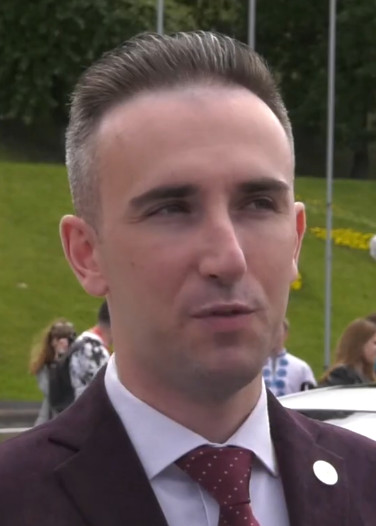
- Lapitsky in 2020

Member of the Council of the Republic
- Incumbent
- Assumed office 22 March 2024
- Constituency: Vitebsk region

Personal details
- Born: 29 February 1988 (age 38)

Gleb Alexandrovich Lapitsky (Russian: Глеб Александрович Лапицкий; born 29 February 1988) is a Belarusian politician serving as a member of the Council of the Republic since 2024. He has served as director of the Slavianski Bazaar in Vitebsk since 2018.
