= Nozdrachevo =

Rural locality in Kursk Oblast, Russia

Nozdrachevo Ноздрачево
- Selo
- Interactive map of Nozdrachevo
- Location of Nozdrachevo Nozdrachevo (Kursk Oblast)
- Coordinates: 51°49′22″N 36°20′58″E
- Country: Russia
- Federal subject: Kursk Oblast
- Administrative district: Kursky District
- SelsovietSelsoviet: Nozdrachevsky

Population (2010 Census)
  - Total: 430
  - Estimate (2010): 430 (0%)

Administrative status
  - Capital of: Nozdrachevsky Selsoviet

Municipal status
  - Municipal district: Kursky Municipal District
  - Rural settlement: Nozdrachevsky Selsoviet Rural Settlement
  - Capital of: Nozdrachevsky Selsoviet Rural Settlement
- Time zone: UTC+3 (MSK)
- Postal code: 305513
- Dialing code: +7 4712
- OKTMO ID: 38620456101
- Website: nozdrachevo.rkursk.ru

Nozdrachevo (Russian: Ноздрачево) is a rural locality (Russian: село, lit. 'village') and the administrative center of Nozdrachevsky Selsoviet Rural Settlement, Kursky District, Kursk Oblast, Russia. Population: 430 (2010 census); 434 (2002 census);

== Geography ==
The village is located on the Vinogrobl River, which is a left tributary of the Tuskar River in the basin of the Seym). It is situated 107 km away from the Russia–Ukraine border and 9 km to the northeast of the district center, which is the town of Kursk.

Climate

Nozdrachevo has a warm-summer humid continental climate (Dfb in the Köppen climate classification).

Climate data for Nozdrachevo
Month	Jan	Feb	Mar	Apr	May	Jun	Jul	Aug	Sep	Oct	Nov	Dec	Year
Mean daily maximum °C (°F)	−4.3 (24.3)	−3.4 (25.9)	2.5 (36.5)	12.9 (55.2)	19.3 (66.7)	22.6 (72.7)	25.3 (77.5)	24.6 (76.3)	18 (64)	10.4 (50.7)	3.2 (37.8)	−1.4 (29.5)	10.8 (51.4)
Daily mean °C (°F)	−6.4 (20.5)	−5.9 (21.4)	−1.1 (30.0)	8 (46)	14.6 (58.3)	18.3 (64.9)	20.9 (69.6)	19.9 (67.8)	13.9 (57.0)	7.1 (44.8)	0.9 (33.6)	−3.3 (26.1)	7.2 (45.0)
Mean daily minimum °C (°F)	−8.9 (16.0)	−8.9 (16.0)	−5.1 (22.8)	2.5 (36.5)	8.9 (48.0)	12.9 (55.2)	15.8 (60.4)	14.8 (58.6)	9.6 (49.3)	3.8 (38.8)	−1.4 (29.5)	−5.5 (22.1)	3.2 (37.8)
Average precipitation mm (inches)	51 (2.0)	44 (1.7)	47 (1.9)	50 (2.0)	60 (2.4)	68 (2.7)	70 (2.8)	55 (2.2)	59 (2.3)	59 (2.3)	46 (1.8)	48 (1.9)	657 (26)
Source: https://en.climate-data.org/asia/russian-federation/kursk-oblast/ноздрачево-468692/

== Transport ==
Nozdrachevo is located 15 km from the federal route M-2 Crimea Highway (a part of the European route E105), 4 km from the road of regional importance 38K-016 (Kursk – Kastornoye), on the roads of intermunicipal significance 38H-331 (38K-016 – Nozdrachevo – Vinogrobl) and 38H-327 (38K-016 – Muravlevo – Mikhaylovo – Nozdrachevo), 4 km from the nearest railway station Nozdrachevo (railway line Kursk – 146 km).

The rural locality is situated 9 km from Kursk Vostochny Airport, 131 km from Belgorod International Airport and 198 km from Voronezh Peter the Great Airport.
