= Shchetinka, Kursk Oblast =

Rural locality in Kursk Oblast, Russia

Shchetinka Щетинка
- Village
- Interactive map of Shchetinka
- Location of Shchetinka Shchetinka (Kursk Oblast)
- Coordinates: 51°47′11″N 36°13′38″E
- Country: Russia
- Federal subject: Kursk Oblast
- Administrative district: Kursky District
- SelsovietSelsoviet: Shchetinsky

Population (2010 Census)
  - Total: 592
  - Estimate (2010): 592 (0%)

Administrative status
  - Capital of: Shchetinsky Selsoviet

Municipal status
  - Municipal district: Kursky Municipal District
  - Rural settlement: Shchetinsky Selsoviet Rural Settlement
  - Capital of: Shchetinsky Selsoviet Rural Settlement
- Time zone: UTC+3 (MSK)
- Postal code: 305511
- Dialing code: +7 4712
- OKTMO ID: 38620492101
- Website: shetin.rkursk.ru

Shchetinka (Russian: Щетинка) is a rural locality (Russian: деревня, lit. 'village') and the administrative center of Shchetinsky Selsoviet Rural Settlement, Kursky District, Kursk Oblast, Russia. Population: 592 (2010 census); 598 (2002 census);

== Geography ==
The village is located on the Tuskar River (a right tributary of the Seym), 97 km from the Russia–Ukraine border, at the northern border of the district center – the town Kursk.

Streets

There are the following streets in the locality: Energetikov, Lugovaya, Osennyaya, Rechnaya and Rozhdestvenskaya (245 houses).

Climate

Shchetinka has a warm-summer humid continental climate (Dfb in the Köppen climate classification).

Climate data for Shchetinka
| Month | Jan | Feb | Mar | Apr | May | Jun | Jul | Aug | Sep | Oct | Nov | Dec | Year |
|---|---|---|---|---|---|---|---|---|---|---|---|---|---|
| Mean daily maximum °C (°F) | −4.3 (24.3) | −3.3 (26.1) | 2.5 (36.5) | 12.9 (55.2) | 19.3 (66.7) | 22.6 (72.7) | 25.3 (77.5) | 24.5 (76.1) | 18.1 (64.6) | 10.4 (50.7) | 3.2 (37.8) | −1.4 (29.5) | 10.8 (51.5) |
| Daily mean °C (°F) | −6.4 (20.5) | −5.9 (21.4) | −1.1 (30.0) | 8.1 (46.6) | 14.6 (58.3) | 18.3 (64.9) | 20.9 (69.6) | 19.9 (67.8) | 13.9 (57.0) | 7.1 (44.8) | 1 (34) | −3.3 (26.1) | 7.3 (45.1) |
| Mean daily minimum °C (°F) | −8.9 (16.0) | −9 (16) | −5.1 (22.8) | 2.5 (36.5) | 8.9 (48.0) | 12.9 (55.2) | 15.7 (60.3) | 14.8 (58.6) | 9.6 (49.3) | 3.8 (38.8) | −1.4 (29.5) | −5.5 (22.1) | 3.2 (37.8) |
| Average precipitation mm (inches) | 51 (2.0) | 44 (1.7) | 47 (1.9) | 50 (2.0) | 60 (2.4) | 68 (2.7) | 70 (2.8) | 55 (2.2) | 59 (2.3) | 59 (2.3) | 46 (1.8) | 48 (1.9) | 657 (26) |
Source: https://en.climate-data.org/asia/russian-federation/kursk-oblast/щетинка-319130/

== Transport ==
Shchetinka is located 7 km from the federal route M-2 Crimea Highway (a part of the European route E105), on the road of regional importance 38K-018 (Kursk – Ponyri), 1 km from the nearest railway halt 4 km (railway line Kursk – 146 km).

The rural locality is situated 5 km from Kursk Vostochny Airport, 128 km from Belgorod International Airport and 207 km from Voronezh Peter the Great Airport.
