= Kamyshi, Kursk Oblast =

Rural locality in Kursk Oblast, Russia

Kamyshi Камыши
- Settlement
- Interactive map of Kamyshi
- Location of Kamyshi Kamyshi (Kursk Oblast)
- Coordinates: 51°48′35″N 36°16′31″E
- Country: Russia
- Federal subject: Kursk Oblast
- Administrative district: Kursky District
- SelsovietSelsoviet: Kamyshinsky

Population (2010 Census)
  - Total: 1,370
  - Estimate (2010): 1,370 (0%)

Administrative status
  - Capital of: Kamyshinsky Selsoviet

Municipal status
  - Municipal district: Kursky Municipal District
  - Rural settlement: Kamyshinsky Selsoviet Rural Settlement
  - Capital of: Kamyshinsky Selsoviet Rural Settlement
- Time zone: UTC+3 (MSK)
- Postal code: 305512
- Dialing code: +7 4712
- OKTMO ID: 38620426101
- Website: kamish.rkursk.ru

Kamyshi (Russian: Камыши) is a rural locality (a settlement) and the administrative center of Kamyshinsky Selsoviet Rural Settlement, Kursky District, Kursk Oblast, Russia. Population: 1,370 (2010 census); 1,527 (2002 census);

== Geography ==
The settlement is located on the Vinogrobl River (a left tributary of the Tuskar in the basin of the Seym), 102 km from the Russia–Ukraine border, 5 km north-east of the district center – the town Kursk.

Streets

There are the following streets in the locality: Lesnaya, Mayskaya, Mirnaya, Molodyozhnaya, Sadovaya, Severomorskaya and Tayozhnaya (131 houses).

Climate

Kamyshi has a warm-summer humid continental climate (Dfb in the Köppen climate classification).

Climate data for Kamyshi
Month	Jan	Feb	Mar	Apr	May	Jun	Jul	Aug	Sep	Oct	Nov	Dec	Year
Mean daily maximum °C (°F)	−4.3 (24.3)	−3.4 (25.9)	2.5 (36.5)	12.9 (55.2)	19.3 (66.7)	22.6 (72.7)	25.3 (77.5)	24.6 (76.3)	18 (64)	10.4 (50.7)	3.2 (37.8)	−1.4 (29.5)	10.8 (51.4)
Daily mean °C (°F)	−6.4 (20.5)	−5.9 (21.4)	−1.1 (30.0)	8 (46)	14.6 (58.3)	18.3 (64.9)	20.9 (69.6)	19.9 (67.8)	13.9 (57.0)	7.1 (44.8)	0.9 (33.6)	−3.3 (26.1)	7.2 (45.0)
Mean daily minimum °C (°F)	−8.9 (16.0)	−8.9 (16.0)	−5.1 (22.8)	2.5 (36.5)	8.9 (48.0)	12.9 (55.2)	15.8 (60.4)	14.8 (58.6)	9.6 (49.3)	3.8 (38.8)	−1.4 (29.5)	−5.5 (22.1)	3.2 (37.8)
Average precipitation mm (inches)	51 (2.0)	44 (1.7)	47 (1.9)	50 (2.0)	60 (2.4)	68 (2.7)	70 (2.8)	55 (2.2)	59 (2.3)	59 (2.3)	46 (1.8)	48 (1.9)	657 (26)
Source: https://en.climate-data.org/asia/russian-federation/kursk-oblast/камыши-319129/

== Transport ==
Kamyshi is located, 10 km from the federal route M-2 Crimea Highway (a part of the European route E105), 1 km from the road of regional importance 38K-018 (Kursk – Ponyri), on the road of intermunicipal significance 38H-402 (38K-018 – Kamyshi), 2 km from the railway junction 530 km (railway line Oryol – Kursk).

The rural locality is situated 6 km from Kursk Vostochny Airport, 130 km from Belgorod International Airport and 203 km from Voronezh Peter the Great Airport.
