= Chaplygina, Kursk Oblast =

Rural locality in Kursk Oblast, Russia

Chaplygina Чаплыгина
- Village
- Interactive map of Chaplygina
- Location of Chaplygina Chaplygina (Kursk Oblast)
- Coordinates: 51°52′44″N 36°10′08″E
- Country: Russia
- Federal subject: Kursk Oblast
- Administrative district: Kursky District
- SelsovietSelsoviet: Pashkovsky
- Elevation: 221 m (725 ft)

Population (2010 Census)
  - Total: 266
  - Estimate (2010): 266 (0%)

Administrative status
  - Capital of: Pashkovsky Selsoviet

Municipal status
  - Municipal district: Kursky Municipal District
  - Rural settlement: Pashkovsky Selsoviet Rural Settlement
  - Capital of: Pashkovsky Selsoviet Rural Settlement
- Time zone: UTC+3 (MSK)
- Postal code: 305515
- Dialing code: +7 4712
- OKTMO ID: 38620460101
- Website: pashkovskiy.rkursk.ru

Chaplygina (Russian: Чаплыгина) is a rural locality (Russian: деревня, lit. 'village') and the administrative center of Pashkovsky Selsoviet Rural Settlement, Kursky District, Kursk Oblast, Russia. Population: 266 (2010 census); 285 (2002 census);

== Geography ==
The village is located on the Obmet River (a right tributary of the Tuskar in the basin of the Seym), 102 km from the Russia–Ukraine border, 7 km north of the district center – the town Kursk.

Climate

Chaplygina has a warm-summer humid continental climate (Dfb in the Köppen climate classification).

Climate data for Chaplygina
Month	Jan	Feb	Mar	Apr	May	Jun	Jul	Aug	Sep	Oct	Nov	Dec	Year
Mean daily maximum °C (°F)	−4.4 (24.1)	−3.5 (25.7)	2.3 (36.1)	12.7 (54.9)	19.1 (66.4)	22.4 (72.3)	25.1 (77.2)	24.4 (75.9)	17.9 (64.2)	10.3 (50.5)	3.1 (37.6)	−1.4 (29.5)	10.7 (51.2)
Daily mean °C (°F)	−6.5 (20.3)	−6 (21)	−1.2 (29.8)	7.9 (46.2)	14.5 (58.1)	18.1 (64.6)	20.7 (69.3)	19.8 (67.6)	13.7 (56.7)	7 (45)	0.9 (33.6)	−3.4 (25.9)	7.1 (44.8)
Mean daily minimum °C (°F)	−9 (16)	−9.1 (15.6)	−5.3 (22.5)	2.3 (36.1)	8.8 (47.8)	12.7 (54.9)	15.6 (60.1)	14.6 (58.3)	9.5 (49.1)	3.7 (38.7)	−1.5 (29.3)	−5.6 (21.9)	3.1 (37.5)
Average precipitation mm (inches)	52 (2.0)	45 (1.8)	46 (1.8)	51 (2.0)	61 (2.4)	72 (2.8)	73 (2.9)	56 (2.2)	62 (2.4)	60 (2.4)	47 (1.9)	49 (1.9)	674 (26.5)
Source: https://en.climate-data.org/asia/russian-federation/kursk-oblast/чаплыгина-656084/

== Transport ==
Chaplygina is located 6.5 km from the federal route M-2 Crimea Highway (a part of the European route E105), 7.5 km from the road of regional importance 38K-018 (Kursk – Ponyri), 6.5 km from the road of intermunicipal significance 38H-379 (Kursk – Iskra), on the road 38H-381 (38N-379 – Chaplygina – Alyabyevo), 8 km from the nearest railway halt Bukreyevka (railway line Oryol – Kursk).

The rural locality is situated 16 km from Kursk Vostochny Airport, 138 km from Belgorod International Airport and 211 km from Voronezh Peter the Great Airport.
