= Iskra, Kursky District, Kursk Oblast =

Rural locality in Kursk Oblast, Russia

Iskra Искра
- Settlement
- Interactive map of Iskra
- Location of Iskra Iskra (Kursk Oblast)
- Coordinates: 51°48′59″N 36°11′40″E
- Country: Russia
- Federal subject: Kursk Oblast
- Administrative district: Kursky District
- SelsovietSelsoviet: Shchetinsky

Population (2010 Census)
  - Total: 1,794
  - Estimate (2010): 1,794 (0%)

Municipal status
  - Municipal district: Kursky Municipal District
  - Rural settlement: Shchetinsky Selsoviet Rural Settlement
- Time zone: UTC+3 (MSK)
- Postal code: 305514
- Dialing code: +7 4712
- OKTMO ID: 38620492106
- Website: shetin.rkursk.ru

Iskra (Russian: Искра) is a rural locality (a settlement) in Shchetinsky Selsoviet Rural Settlement, Kursky District, Kursk Oblast, Russia. Population: 1,794 (2010 census); 1,359 (2002 census);

== Geography ==
The settlement is located on the Tuskar River (a right tributary of the Seym), 98 km from the Russia–Ukraine border, at the northern border of the district center – the town Kursk, 3.5 km from the selsoviet center – Shchetinka.

Streets

There are the following streets in the locality: Dorozhnaya, Pervomayskaya and Shkolnaya (72 houses).

Climate

Iskra has a warm-summer humid continental climate (Dfb in the Köppen climate classification).

Climate data for Iskra
Month	Jan	Feb	Mar	Apr	May	Jun	Jul	Aug	Sep	Oct	Nov	Dec	Year
Mean daily maximum °C (°F)	−4.3 (24.3)	−3.3 (26.1)	2.5 (36.5)	12.9 (55.2)	19.3 (66.7)	22.6 (72.7)	25.3 (77.5)	24.5 (76.1)	18.1 (64.6)	10.4 (50.7)	3.2 (37.8)	−1.4 (29.5)	10.8 (51.5)
Daily mean °C (°F)	−6.4 (20.5)	−5.9 (21.4)	−1.1 (30.0)	8.1 (46.6)	14.6 (58.3)	18.3 (64.9)	20.9 (69.6)	19.9 (67.8)	13.9 (57.0)	7.1 (44.8)	1 (34)	−3.3 (26.1)	7.3 (45.1)
Mean daily minimum °C (°F)	−8.9 (16.0)	−9 (16)	−5.1 (22.8)	2.5 (36.5)	8.9 (48.0)	12.9 (55.2)	15.7 (60.3)	14.8 (58.6)	9.6 (49.3)	3.8 (38.8)	−1.4 (29.5)	−5.5 (22.1)	3.2 (37.8)
Average precipitation mm (inches)	51 (2.0)	44 (1.7)	47 (1.9)	50 (2.0)	60 (2.4)	68 (2.7)	70 (2.8)	55 (2.2)	59 (2.3)	59 (2.3)	46 (1.8)	48 (1.9)	657 (26)
Source: https://en.climate-data.org/asia/russian-federation/kursk-oblast/искра-656082/

== Transport ==
Iskra is located 4.5 km from the federal route M-2 Crimea Highway (a part of the European route E105), on the roads of intermunicipal significance 38H-379 (Kursk – Iskra) and 38H-386 (38N-379 – Shuklinka), 3.5 km from the railway junction 530 km (railway line Oryol – Kursk).

The rural locality is situated 9.5 km from Kursk Vostochny Airport, 131 km from Belgorod International Airport and 209 km from Voronezh Peter the Great Airport.
