= Tuskar =

River in Russia

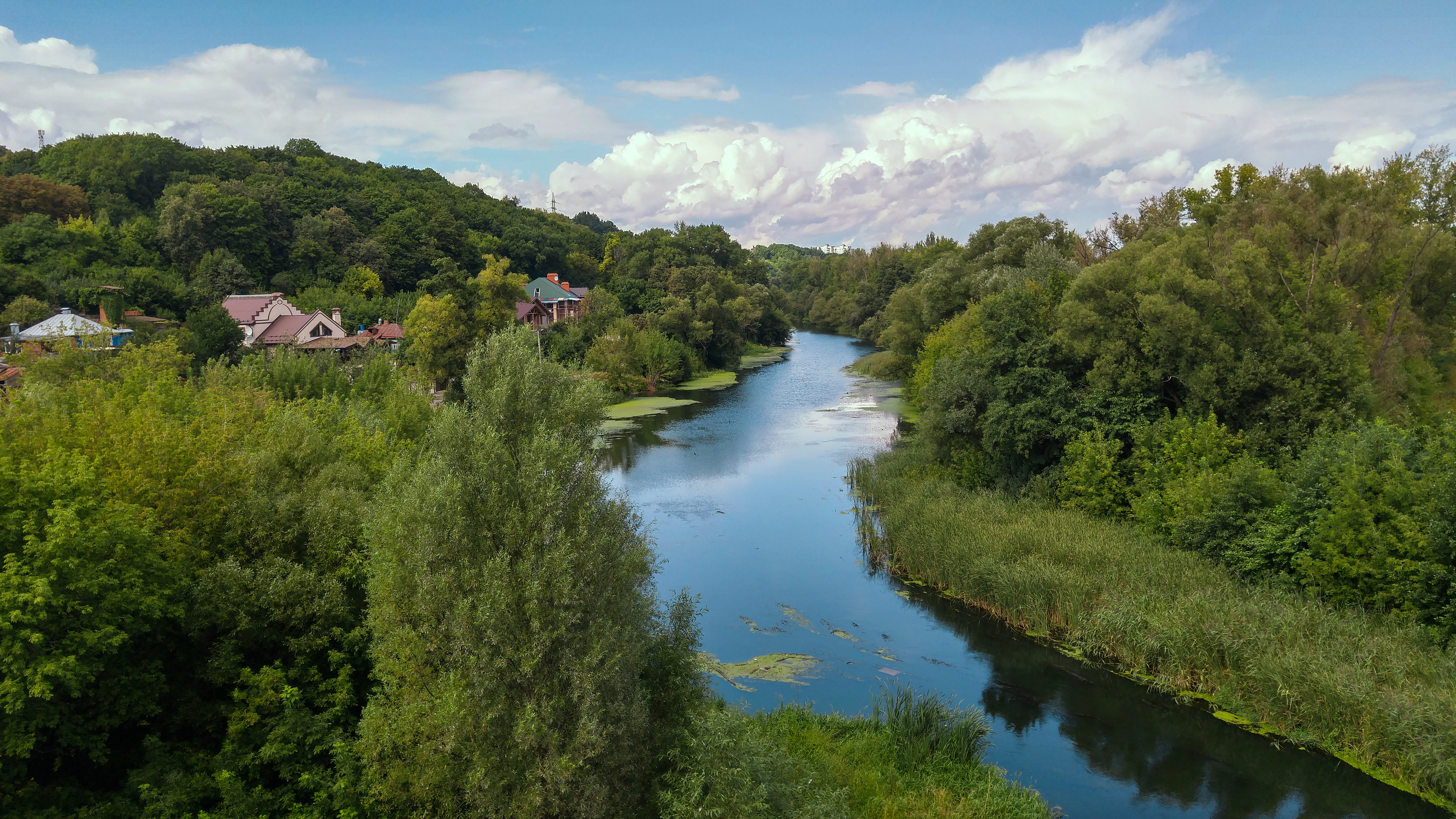
- Tuskar in Kursk
- Native name: Тускарь (Russian)

Location
- Country: Russia

Physical characteristics
- Source
  - location: Shchigrovsky District
- Mouth: Seym
  - location: Kursk
  - coordinates: 51°41′58″N 36°12′20″E
- Length: 108 km (67 mi)
- Basin size: 2,475 km^{2} (956 sq mi)

Basin features
- Progression: Seym→ Desna→ Dnieper→ Dnieper–Bug estuary→ Black Sea

The Tuskar (Russian: Тускарь) is a river in Kursk Oblast, Russia, and the third largest tributary of the Seym. Part of the greater Dnieper basin, the mouth of the river is located in the city of Kursk. The small river Kur is a tributary of the Tuskar in Kursk.
