= Sakharovka, Kursk Oblast =

Rural locality in Kursk Oblast, Russia

Sakharovka Сахаровка
- Settlement
- Interactive map of Sakharovka
- Location of Sakharovka Sakharovka (Kursk Oblast)
- Coordinates: 51°41′42″N 36°18′19″E
- Country: Russia
- Federal subject: Kursk Oblast
- Administrative district: Kursky District
- SelsovietSelsoviet: Klyukvinsky

Population (2010 Census)
  - Total: 940
  - Estimate (2010): 940 (0%)

Municipal status
  - Municipal district: Kursky Municipal District
  - Rural settlement: Klyukvinsky Selsoviet Rural Settlement
- Time zone: UTC+3 (MSK)
- Postal code: 305500
- Dialing code: +7 4712
- OKTMO ID: 38620428121
- Website: klukva.rkursk.ru

Sakharovka (Russian: Сахаровка) is a rural locality (a settlement) in Klyukvinsky Selsoviet Rural Settlement, Kursky District, Kursk Oblast, Russia. Population: 940 (2010 census); 248 (2002 census);

== Geography ==
The settlement is located on the Seym River (a left tributary of the Desna), 96 km from the Russia–Ukraine border, 4 km south-east of the district center – the town Kursk, 4 km from the selsoviet center – Dolgoye.

Climate

Sakharovka has a warm-summer humid continental climate (Dfb in the Köppen climate classification).

Climate data for Sakharovka
Month	Jan	Feb	Mar	Apr	May	Jun	Jul	Aug	Sep	Oct	Nov	Dec	Year
Mean daily maximum °C (°F)	−4.2 (24.4)	−3.2 (26.2)	2.7 (36.9)	13 (55)	19.4 (66.9)	22.7 (72.9)	25.4 (77.7)	24.7 (76.5)	18.2 (64.8)	10.5 (50.9)	3.3 (37.9)	−1.3 (29.7)	10.9 (51.7)
Daily mean °C (°F)	−6.3 (20.7)	−5.8 (21.6)	−0.9 (30.4)	8.2 (46.8)	14.7 (58.5)	18.4 (65.1)	21 (70)	20.1 (68.2)	14 (57)	7.2 (45.0)	1 (34)	−3.2 (26.2)	7.4 (45.3)
Mean daily minimum °C (°F)	−8.8 (16.2)	−8.9 (16.0)	−5 (23)	2.6 (36.7)	9 (48)	13 (55)	15.8 (60.4)	14.9 (58.8)	9.7 (49.5)	3.9 (39.0)	−1.3 (29.7)	−5.4 (22.3)	3.3 (37.9)
Average precipitation mm (inches)	51 (2.0)	44 (1.7)	47 (1.9)	50 (2.0)	60 (2.4)	68 (2.7)	70 (2.8)	55 (2.2)	59 (2.3)	59 (2.3)	46 (1.8)	48 (1.9)	657 (26)
Source: https://en.climate-data.org/asia/russian-federation/kursk-oblast/сахаровка-665124/

== Transport ==
Sakharovka is located 3 km from the federal route P-298 (Kursk – Voronezh – P-22 "Kaspy" Highway; a part of the European route E38), on the road of regional importance 38K-019 (Kursk – Bolshoye Shumakovo – Polevaya via Lebyazhye). There is a railway station Klyukva (railway line Klyukva — Belgorod).

The rural locality is situated 5 km from Kursk Vostochny Airport, 117 km from Belgorod International Airport and 202 km from Voronezh Peter the Great Airport.
