= Yeryomino, Kursk Oblast =

Rural locality in Kursk Oblast, Russia

Yeryomino Ерёмино
- Village
- Interactive map of Yeryomino
- Location of Yeryomino Yeryomino (Kursk Oblast)
- Coordinates: 51°38′01″N 36°30′27″E
- Country: Russia
- Federal subject: Kursk Oblast
- Administrative district: Kursky District
- SelsovietSelsoviet: Polevskoy

Population (2010 Census)
  - Total: 60
  - Estimate (2010): 60 (0%)

Municipal status
  - Municipal district: Kursky Municipal District
  - Rural settlement: Polevskoy Selsoviet Rural Settlement
- Time zone: UTC+3 (MSK)
- Postal code: 305543
- Dialing code: +7 4712
- OKTMO ID: 38620468146
- Website: polevaya.rkursk.ru

Yeryomino (Russian: Ерёмино) is a rural locality (Russian: деревня, lit. 'village') in Polevskoy Selsoviet Rural Settlement, Kursky District, Kursk Oblast, Russia. Population: 60 (2010 census); 63 (2002 census);

== Geography ==
The village is located on the Seym River (a left tributary of the Desna), 101 km from the Russia–Ukraine border, 22 km south-east of the district center – the town Kursk, 2.5 km from the selsoviet center – Polevaya.

Climate

Yeryomino has a warm-summer humid continental climate (Dfb in the Köppen climate classification).

== Transport ==
Yeryomino is located 7 km from the federal route P-298 (Kursk – Voronezh – P-22 "Kaspy" Highway; a part of the European route E38), 2.5 km from the road of regional importance 38K-019 (Kursk – Bolshoye Shumakovo – Polevaya via Lebyazhye), 0.5 km from the road 38K-014 (R-298 – Polevaya), 3 km from the nearest railway station Polevaya (railway line Klyukva — Belgorod).

The rural locality is situated 21 km from Kursk Vostochny Airport, 109 km from Belgorod International Airport and 189 km from Voronezh Peter the Great Airport.
