= Malaya Shumakovka =

Rural locality in Kursk Oblast, Russia

Malaya Shumakovka Малая Шумаковка
- Village
- Interactive map of Malaya Shumakovka
- Location of Malaya Shumakovka Malaya Shumakovka (Kursk Oblast)
- Coordinates: 51°40′54″N 36°23′31″E
- Country: Russia
- Federal subject: Kursk Oblast
- Administrative district: Kursky District
- SelsovietSelsoviet: Shumakovsky

Population (2010 Census)
  - Total: 181
  - Estimate (2010): 181 (0%)

Municipal status
  - Municipal district: Kursky Municipal District
  - Rural settlement: Shumakovsky Selsoviet Rural Settlement
- Time zone: UTC+3 (MSK)
- Postal code: 305541
- Dialing code: +7 4712
- OKTMO ID: 38620488111
- Website: shumakovo.rkursk.ru

Malaya Shumakovka (Russian: Малая Шумаковка) is a rural locality (Russian: деревня, lit. 'village') in Shumakovsky Selsoviet Rural Settlement, Kursky District, Kursk Oblast, Russia. Population: 181 (2010 census); 201 (2002 census);

== Geography ==
The village is located on the Mlodat River (a left tributary of the Seym), 98 km from the Russia–Ukraine border, 13 km south-east of the district center – the town Kursk, 3.5 km from the selsoviet center – Bolshoye Shumakovo.

Climate

Malaya Shumakovka has a warm-summer humid continental climate (Dfb in the Köppen climate classification).

== Transport ==
Malaya Shumakovka is located 4.5 km from the federal route P-298 (Kursk – Voronezh – P-22 "Kaspy" Highway; a part of the European route E38), 3 km from the road of regional importance 38K-019 (Kursk – Bolshoye Shumakovo – Polevaya via Lebyazhye), 2.5 km from the nearest railway station Konaryovo (railway line Klyukva — Belgorod).

The rural locality is situated 11 km from Kursk Vostochny Airport, 115 km from Belgorod International Airport and 196 km from Voronezh Peter the Great Airport.
