= Kizilovo =

Rural locality in Kursk Oblast, Russia

Kizilovo Кизилово
- Selo
- Interactive map of Kizilovo
- Location of Kizilovo Kizilovo (Kursk Oblast)
- Coordinates: 51°34′12″N 36°31′18″E
- Country: Russia
- Federal subject: Kursk Oblast
- Administrative district: Kursky District
- SelsovietSelsoviet: Polevskoy

Population (2010 Census)
  - Total: 271
  - Estimate (2010): 271 (0%)

Municipal status
  - Municipal district: Kursky Municipal District
  - Rural settlement: Polevskoy Selsoviet Rural Settlement
- Time zone: UTC+3 (MSK)
- Postal code: 305540
- Dialing code: +7 4712
- OKTMO ID: 38620468111
- Website: polevaya.rkursk.ru

Kizilovo (Russian: Кизилово) is a rural locality (Russian: село, lit. 'village') in Polevskoy Selsoviet Rural Settlement, Kursky District, Kursk Oblast, Russia. Population: 271 (2010 census); 336 (2002 census);

== Geography ==
The village is located on the Polnaya River (a left tributary of the Seym), 97 km from the Russia–Ukraine border, 26 km south-east of the district center – the town Kursk, 4 km from the selsoviet center – Polevaya.

Streets

There are the following streets in the locality: Lugovaya and Shkolnaya (178 houses).

Climate

Kizilovo has a warm-summer humid continental climate (Dfb in the Köppen climate classification).

== Transport ==
Kizilovo is located 13 km from the federal route P-298 (Kursk – Voronezh – P-22 "Kaspy" Highway; a part of the European route E38), 3.5 km from the road of regional importance 38K-019 (Kursk – Bolshoye Shumakovo – Polevaya via Lebyazhye), on the road of intermunicipal significance 38H-538 (Polevaya – Kizilovo), 3.5 km from the nearest railway halt Gutorovo (railway line Klyukva — Belgorod).

The rural locality is situated 27 km from Kursk Vostochny Airport, 101 km from Belgorod International Airport and 189 km from Voronezh Peter the Great Airport.
