= Krasny Pakhar, Kursky District, Kursk Oblast =

Rural locality in Kursk Oblast, Russia

Krasny Pakhar Красный Пахарь
- Khutor
- Interactive map of Krasny Pakhar
- Location of Krasny Pakhar Krasny Pakhar (Kursk Oblast)
- Coordinates: 51°35′27″N 36°18′19″E
- Country: Russia
- Federal subject: Kursk Oblast
- Administrative district: Kursky District
- SelsovietSelsoviet: Lebyazhensky
- Elevation: 178 m (584 ft)

Population (2010 Census)
  - Total: 55
  - Estimate (2010): 55 (0%)

Municipal status
  - Municipal district: Kursky Municipal District
  - Rural settlement: Lebyazhensky Selsoviet Rural Settlement
- Time zone: UTC+3 (MSK)
- Postal code: 305526
- Dialing code: +7 4712
- OKTMO ID: 38620432131
- Website: lebajye.rkursk.ru

Krasny Pakhar (Russian: Красный Пахарь) is a rural locality (a khutor) in Lebyazhensky Selsoviet Rural Settlement, Kursky District, Kursk Oblast, Russia. Population: 55 (2010 census); 48 (2002 census);

== Geography ==
The khutor is located on the Mlodat River (a left tributary of the Seym), 87 km from the Russia–Ukraine border, 14 km south-east of Kursk, 3.5 km from the selsoviet center – Cheryomushki.

Climate

Krasny Pakhar has a warm-summer humid continental climate (Dfb in the Köppen climate classification).

== Transport ==
Krasny Pakhar is located 4.5 km from the road of intermunicipal significance 38H-416 (Kursk – Petrin), on the road 38H-048 (2nd Bukreyevo – Khoruzhevka – Smorodnoye), 8.5 km from the nearest railway halt Zaplava (railway line Klyukva — Belgorod).

The rural locality is situated 18.5 km from Kursk Vostochny Airport, 106 km from Belgorod International Airport and 204 km from Voronezh Peter the Great Airport.
