= Klyukvinsky =

Rural locality in Kursk Oblast, Russia

Klyukvinsky Клюквинский
- Settlement
- Interactive map of Klyukvinsky
- Location of Klyukvinsky Klyukvinsky (Kursk Oblast)
- Coordinates: 51°41′23″N 36°17′00″E
- Country: Russia
- Federal subject: Kursk Oblast
- Administrative district: Kursky District
- SelsovietSelsoviet: Lebyazhensky

Population (2010 Census)
  - Total: 90
  - Estimate (2010): 90 (0%)

Municipal status
  - Municipal district: Kursky Municipal District
  - Rural settlement: Lebyazhensky Selsoviet Rural Settlement
- Time zone: UTC+3 (MSK)
- Postal code: 305526
- Dialing code: +7 4712
- OKTMO ID: 38620432126
- Website: lebajye.rkursk.ru

Klyukvinsky (Russian: Клюквинский) is a rural locality (a settlement) in Lebyazhensky Selsoviet Rural Settlement, Kursky District, Kursk Oblast, Russia. Population: 90 (2010 census); 84 (2002 census);

== Geography ==
The settlement is located 94 km from the Russia–Ukraine border, 5 km south-east of the district center – the town Kursk, 10 km from the selsoviet center – Cheryomushki.

Climate

Klyukvinsky has a warm-summer humid continental climate (Dfb in the Köppen climate classification).

== Transport ==
Klyukvinsky is located 0.8 km from European route E38 (Ukraine – Russia (Rylsk, Kursk, Voronezh, Borisoglebsk, Saratov, Yershov) – Kazakhstan), 1.5 km from the road of regional importance 38K-019 (Kursk – Bolshoye Shumakovo – Polevaya via Lebyazhye), 1 km from the nearest railway station Klyukva (railway line Klyukva — Belgorod).

The rural locality is situated 7.5 km from Kursk Vostochny Airport, 117 km from Belgorod International Airport and 204 km from Voronezh Peter the Great Airport.
