= Kolodnoye, Kursk Oblast =

Rural locality in Kursk Oblast, Russia

Kolodnoye Колодное
- Selo
- Interactive map of Kolodnoye
- Location of Kolodnoye Kolodnoye (Kursk Oblast)
- Coordinates: 51°38′21″N 36°26′43″E
- Country: Russia
- Federal subject: Kursk Oblast
- Administrative district: Kursky District
- SelsovietSelsoviet: Polevskoy

Population (2010 Census)
  - Total: 655
  - Estimate (2010): 655 (0%)

Municipal status
  - Municipal district: Kursky Municipal District
  - Rural settlement: Polevskoy Selsoviet Rural Settlement
- Time zone: UTC+3 (MSK)
- Postal code: 305540
- Dialing code: +7 4712
- OKTMO ID: 38620468116
- Website: polevaya.rkursk.ru

Kolodnoye (Russian: Колодное) is a rural locality (Russian: село, lit. 'village') in Polevskoy Selsoviet Rural Settlement, Kursky District, Kursk Oblast, Russia. Population: 655 (2010 census); 696 (2002 census);

== Geography ==
The village is located on the Seym River (a left tributary of the Desna), 98 km from the Russia–Ukraine border, 17 km south-east of the district center – the town Kursk, 5 km from the selsoviet center – Polevaya.

Streets

There are the following streets in the locality: Mirnaya, Naberezhnaya, Tikhiye pereulochki and Tsentralnaya (344 houses).

Climate

Kolodnoye has a warm-summer humid continental climate (Dfb in the Köppen climate classification).

Climate data for Kolodnoye
Month	Jan	Feb	Mar	Apr	May	Jun	Jul	Aug	Sep	Oct	Nov	Dec	Year
Mean daily maximum °C (°F)	−4.1 (24.6)	−3.2 (26.2)	2.8 (37.0)	13.1 (55.6)	19.5 (67.1)	22.8 (73.0)	25.4 (77.7)	24.8 (76.6)	18.3 (64.9)	10.6 (51.1)	3.3 (37.9)	−1.2 (29.8)	11.0 (51.8)
Daily mean °C (°F)	−6.2 (20.8)	−5.7 (21.7)	−0.8 (30.6)	8.2 (46.8)	14.8 (58.6)	18.4 (65.1)	21 (70)	20.1 (68.2)	14.1 (57.4)	7.3 (45.1)	1.1 (34.0)	−3.2 (26.2)	7.4 (45.4)
Mean daily minimum °C (°F)	−8.8 (16.2)	−8.9 (16.0)	−5 (23)	2.7 (36.9)	9.1 (48.4)	13 (55)	15.9 (60.6)	14.9 (58.8)	9.7 (49.5)	3.9 (39.0)	−1.3 (29.7)	−5.4 (22.3)	3.3 (38.0)
Average precipitation mm (inches)	51 (2.0)	44 (1.7)	46 (1.8)	50 (2.0)	60 (2.4)	69 (2.7)	72 (2.8)	55 (2.2)	60 (2.4)	59 (2.3)	46 (1.8)	49 (1.9)	661 (26)
Source: https://en.climate-data.org/asia/russian-federation/kursk-oblast/колодное-666208/

== Transport ==
Kolodnoye is located 8 km from the federal route P-298 (Kursk – Voronezh – P-22 "Kaspy" Highway; a part of the European route E38), on the road of regional importance 38K-019 (Kursk – Bolshoye Shumakovo – Polevaya via Lebyazhye), in the vicinity of the railway halt Kolodnoye (railway line Klyukva — Belgorod).

The rural locality is situated 17.5 km from Kursk Vostochny Airport, 110 km from Belgorod International Airport and 193 km from Voronezh Peter the Great Airport.
