= Lisovo, Kursk Oblast =

Rural locality in Kursk Oblast, Russia

Lisovo Лисово
- Village
- Interactive map of Lisovo
- Location of Lisovo Lisovo (Kursk Oblast)
- Coordinates: 51°36′15″N 36°36′15″E
- Country: Russia
- Federal subject: Kursk Oblast
- Administrative district: Kursky District
- SelsovietSelsoviet: Polevskoy

Population (2010 Census)
  - Total: 163
  - Estimate (2010): 163 (0%)

Municipal status
  - Municipal district: Kursky Municipal District
  - Rural settlement: Polevskoy Selsoviet Rural Settlement
- Time zone: UTC+3 (MSK)
- Postal code: 305543
- Dialing code: +7 4712
- OKTMO ID: 38620468161
- Website: polevaya.rkursk.ru

Lisovo (Russian: Лисово) is a rural locality (Russian: деревня, lit. 'village') in Polevskoy Selsoviet Rural Settlement, Kursky District, Kursk Oblast, Russia. Population: 163 (2010 census); 158 (2002 census);

== Geography ==
The village is located on the Seym River (a left tributary of the Desna), 104 km from the Russia–Ukraine border, 29 km south-east of the district center – the town Kursk, 6 km from the selsoviet center – Polevaya.

Climate

Lisovo has a warm-summer humid continental climate (Dfb in the Köppen climate classification).

== Transport ==
Lisovo is located 8 km from the federal route P-298 (Kursk – Voronezh – P-22 "Kaspy" Highway; a part of the European route E38), 6.5 km from the road of regional importance 38K-014 (R-298 – Polevaya), on the road of intermunicipal significance 38H-299 (38K-014 – Demino), 2.5 km from the nearest railway halt Gutorovo (railway line Klyukva — Belgorod).

The rural locality is situated 28 km from Kursk Vostochny Airport, 106 km from Belgorod International Airport and 183 km from Voronezh Peter the Great Airport.
