= Novosyolovsky, Kursk Oblast =

Rural locality in Kursk Oblast, Russia

Novosyolovsky Новосёловский
- Settlement
- Interactive map of Novosyolovsky
- Location of Novosyolovsky Novosyolovsky (Kursk Oblast)
- Coordinates: 51°38′01″N 36°18′03″E
- Country: Russia
- Federal subject: Kursk Oblast
- Administrative district: Kursky District
- SelsovietSelsoviet: Lebyazhensky

Population (2010 Census)
  - Total: 103
  - Estimate (2010): 103 (0%)

Municipal status
  - Municipal district: Kursky Municipal District
  - Rural settlement: Lebyazhensky Selsoviet Rural Settlement
- Time zone: UTC+3 (MSK)
- Postal code: 305526
- Dialing code: +7 4712
- OKTMO ID: 38620432151
- Website: lebajye.rkursk.ru

Novosyolovsky (Russian: Новосёловский) is a rural locality (a settlement) in Lebyazhensky Selsoviet Rural Settlement, Kursky District, Kursk Oblast, Russia. Population: 103 (2010 census); 130 (2002 census);

== Geography ==
The settlement is located 90 km from the Russia–Ukraine border, 10 km south-east of the district center – the town Kursk, 4.5 km from the selsoviet center – Cheryomushki.

Streets

There are the following streets in the locality: Sadovaya and Tenistaya (31 houses).

Climate

Novosyolovsky has a warm-summer humid continental climate (Dfb in the Köppen climate classification).

== Transport ==
Novosyolovsky is located 3.5 km from the road of regional importance 38K-019 (Kursk – Bolshoye Shumakovo – Polevaya via Lebyazhye), 5 km from the road of intermunicipal significance 38H-416 (Kursk – Petrin), 1 km from the road 38H-418 (38H-416 – 38K-019), 5.5 km from the nearest railway station Konaryovo (railway line Klyukva — Belgorod).

The rural locality is situated 14 km from Kursk Vostochny Airport, 111 km from Belgorod International Airport and 203 km from Voronezh Peter the Great Airport.
