= Radino, Kursk Oblast =

Rural locality in Kursk Oblast, Russia

Radino Радино
- Village
- Interactive map of Radino
- Location of Radino Radino (Kursk Oblast)
- Coordinates: 51°36′56″N 36°21′10″E
- Country: Russia
- Federal subject: Kursk Oblast
- Administrative district: Kursky District
- SelsovietSelsoviet: Lebyazhensky

Population (2010 Census)
  - Total: 40
  - Estimate (2010): 40 (0%)

Municipal status
  - Municipal district: Kursky Municipal District
  - Rural settlement: Lebyazhensky Selsoviet Rural Settlement
- Time zone: UTC+3 (MSK)
- Postal code: 305526
- Dialing code: +7 4712
- OKTMO ID: 38620432161
- Website: lebajye.rkursk.ru

Radino (Russian: Радино) is a rural locality (Russian: деревня, lit. 'village') in Lebyazhensky Selsoviet Rural Settlement, Kursky District, Kursk Oblast, Russia. Population: 40 (2010 census); 56 (2002 census);

== Geography ==
The village is located on the Mlodat River (a left tributary of the Seym), 91 km from the Russia–Ukraine border, 14 km south-east of Kursk, 6.5 km from the selsoviet center – Cheryomushki.

Climate

Radino has a warm-summer humid continental climate (Dfb in the Köppen climate classification).

== Transport ==
Radino is located 3.5 km from the road of regional importance 38K-019 (Kursk – Bolshoye Shumakovo – Polevaya via Lebyazhye), 4 km from the nearest railway halt Zaplava (railway line Klyukva — Belgorod).

The rural locality is situated 17 km from Kursk Vostochny Airport, 107 km from Belgorod International Airport and 200 km from Voronezh Peter the Great Airport.
