= Zvyagintsevo, Kursky District, Kursk Oblast =

Rural locality in Kursk Oblast, Russia

Zvyagintsevo Звягинцево
- Village
- Interactive map of Zvyagintsevo
- Location of Zvyagintsevo Zvyagintsevo (Kursk Oblast)
- Coordinates: 51°41′53″N 36°22′31″E
- Country: Russia
- Federal subject: Kursk Oblast
- Administrative district: Kursky District
- SelsovietSelsoviet: Klyukvinsky

Population (2010 Census)
  - Total: 116
  - Estimate (2010): 116 (0%)

Municipal status
  - Municipal district: Kursky Municipal District
  - Rural settlement: Klyukvinsky Selsoviet Rural Settlement
- Time zone: UTC+3 (MSK)
- Postal code: 305502
- Dialing code: +7 4712
- OKTMO ID: 38620428111
- Website: klukva.rkursk.ru

Zvyagintsevo (Russian: Звягинцево) is a rural locality (Russian: деревня, lit. 'village') in Klyukvinsky Selsoviet Rural Settlement, Kursky District, Kursk Oblast, Russia. Population: 116 (2010 census); 118 (2002 census);

== Geography ==
The village is located on the Seym River (a left tributary of the Desna), 100 km from the Russia–Ukraine border, 9 km east of the district center – the town Kursk, 1.5 km from the selsoviet center – Dolgoye.

Climate

Zvyagintsevo has a warm-summer humid continental climate (Dfb in the Köppen climate classification).

== Transport ==
Zvyagintsevo is located 2.5 km from the federal route P-298 (Kursk – Voronezh – P-22 "Kaspy" Highway; a part of the European route E38), on the road of intermunicipal significance 38H-278 (R-298 – Klyukva – Yakunino), 3.5 km from the nearest railway station Konaryovo (railway line Klyukva — Belgorod).

The rural locality is situated 9 km from Kursk Vostochny Airport, 117 km from Belgorod International Airport and 197 km from Voronezh Peter the Great Airport.
