= Bukreyevka, Lebyazhensky selsoviet, Kursky District, Kursk Oblast =

Rural locality in Kursk Oblast, Russia

Bukreyevka Букреевка
- Selo
- Interactive map of Bukreyevka
- Location of Bukreyevka Bukreyevka (Kursk Oblast)
- Coordinates: 51°40′06″N 36°19′03″E
- Country: Russia
- Federal subject: Kursk Oblast
- Administrative district: Kursky District
- SelsovietSelsoviet: Lebyazhensky

Population (2010 Census)
  - Total: 243
  - Estimate (2010): 243 (0%)

Municipal status
  - Municipal district: Kursky Municipal District
  - Rural settlement: Lebyazhensky Selsoviet Rural Settlement
- Time zone: UTC+3 (MSK)
- Postal code: 305526
- Dialing code: +7 4712
- OKTMO ID: 38620432116
- Website: lebajye.rkursk.ru

Bukreyevka (Russian: Букреевка) is a rural locality (Russian: село, lit. 'village') in Lebyazhensky Selsoviet Rural Settlement, Kursky District, Kursk Oblast, Russia. Population: 243 (2010 census); 297 (2002 census);

== Geography ==
The village is located 94 km from the Russia–Ukraine border, 8 km south-east of Kursk, 8 km from the selsoviet center – Cheryomushki.

Climate

Bukreyevka has a warm-summer humid continental climate (Dfb in the Köppen climate classification).

== Transport ==
Bukreyevka is located 0.3 km from the road of regional importance 38K-019 (Kursk – Bolshoye Shumakovo – Polevaya via Lebyazhye), 1.5 km from the nearest railway station Konaryovo (railway line Klyukva — Belgorod).

The rural locality is situated 10 km from Kursk Vostochny Airport, 114 km from Belgorod International Airport and 201 km from Voronezh Peter the Great Airport.
