= Podlesny, Kursk Oblast =

Rural locality in Kursk Oblast, Russia

Podlesny Подлесный
- Settlement
- Interactive map of Podlesny
- Location of Podlesny Podlesny (Kursk Oblast)
- Coordinates: 51°43′39″N 36°19′06″E
- Country: Russia
- Federal subject: Kursk Oblast
- Administrative district: Kursky District
- SelsovietSelsoviet: Klyukvinsky

Population (2010 Census)
  - Total: 609
  - Estimate (2010): 609 (0%)

Municipal status
  - Municipal district: Kursky Municipal District
  - Rural settlement: Klyukvinsky Selsoviet Rural Settlement
- Time zone: UTC+3 (MSK)
- Postal code: 305502
- Dialing code: +7 4712
- OKTMO ID: 38620428116
- Website: klukva.rkursk.ru

Podlesny (Russian: Подлесный) is a rural locality (a settlement) in Klyukvinsky Selsoviet Rural Settlement, Kursky District, Kursk Oblast, Russia. Population: 609 (2010 census); 623 (2002 census);

== Geography ==
The settlement is located 99 km from the Russia–Ukraine border, 4 km east of the district center – the town Kursk, 2.5 km from the selsoviet center – Dolgoye.

Climate

Podlesny has a warm-summer humid continental climate (Dfb in the Köppen climate classification).

== Transport ==
Podlesny is located on the federal route P-298 (Kursk – Voronezh – P-22 "Kaspy" Highway; a part of the European route E38), 4 km from the nearest railway station Klyukva (railway line Klyukva–Belgorod).

The rural locality is situated 3.5 km from Kursk Vostochny Airport, 120 km from Belgorod International Airport and 201 km from Voronezh Peter the Great Airport.
