= Dubovets, Polevskoy selsoviet, Kursky District, Kursk Oblast =

Rural locality in Kursk Oblast, Russia

Dubovets Дубовец
- Khutor
- Interactive map of Dubovets
- Location of Dubovets Dubovets (Kursk Oblast)
- Coordinates: 51°40′18″N 36°38′53″E
- Country: Russia
- Federal subject: Kursk Oblast
- Administrative district: Kursky District
- SelsovietSelsoviet: Polevskoy

Population (2010 Census)
  - Total: 10
  - Estimate (2010): 10 (0%)

Municipal status
  - Municipal district: Kursky Municipal District
  - Rural settlement: Polevskoy Selsoviet Rural Settlement
- Time zone: UTC+3 (MSK)
- Postal code: 305543
- Dialing code: +7 4712
- OKTMO ID: 38620468136
- Website: polevaya.rkursk.ru

Dubovets (Russian: Дубовец) is a rural locality (a khutor) in Polevskoy Selsoviet Rural Settlement, Kursky District, Kursk Oblast, Russia. Population: 10 (2010 census); 9 (2002 census);

== Geography ==
The khutor is located 111 km from the Russia–Ukraine border, 27 km south-east of the district center – the town Kursk, 11 km from the selsoviet center – Polevaya.

Climate

Dubovets has a warm-summer humid continental climate (Dfb in the Köppen climate classification).

== Transport ==
Dubovets is located on the federal route P-298 (Kursk – Voronezh – P-22 "Kaspy" Highway; a part of the European route E38), 11.5 km from the nearest railway halt Gutorovo (railway line Klyukva — Belgorod).

The rural locality is situated 27 km from Kursk Vostochny Airport, 113 km from Belgorod International Airport and 179 km from Voronezh Peter the Great Airport.
