= Golubitskoye =

Rural locality in Kursk Oblast, Russia

Golubitskoye Голубицкое
- Village
- Interactive map of Golubitskoye
- Location of Golubitskoye Golubitskoye (Kursk Oblast)
- Coordinates: 51°40′17″N 36°11′40″E
- Country: Russia
- Federal subject: Kursk Oblast
- Administrative district: Kursky District
- SelsovietSelsoviet: Ryshkovsky

Population (2010 Census)
  - Total: 330
  - Estimate (2010): 330 (0%)

Municipal status
  - Municipal district: Kursky Municipal District
  - Rural settlement: Ryshkovsky Selsoviet Rural Settlement
- Time zone: UTC+3 (MSK)
- Postal code: 305524
- Dialing code: +7 4712
- OKTMO ID: 38620476106
- Website: rishkovo.rkursk.ru

Golubitskoye (Russian: Голубицкое) is a rural locality (Russian: деревня, lit. 'village') in Ryshkovsky Selsoviet Rural Settlement, Kursky District, Kursk Oblast, Russia. Population: 330 (2010 census); 339 (2002 census);

== Geography ==
The village is located on the Seym River (a left tributary of the Desna), 88 km from the Russia–Ukraine border, at the southern border of Kursk, 0.5 km from the selsoviet center – Ryshkovo.

Streets

There are the following streets in the locality: Molodyozhnaya and Tsentralnaya (114 houses).

Climate

Golubitskoye has a warm-summer humid continental climate (Dfb in the Köppen climate classification).

== Transport ==
Golubitskoye is located on the road of regional importance 38K-015 (Kursk – Zorino – Tolmachyovo), in the vicinity of the railway halt 465 km (railway line Lgov I — Kursk).

The rural locality is situated 11 km from Kursk Vostochny Airport, 116 km from Belgorod International Airport and 210 km from Voronezh Peter the Great Airport.
