= Khalino, Kursky District, Kursk Oblast =

Rural locality in Kursk Oblast, Russia

Khalino Халино
- Village
- Interactive map of Khalino
- Location of Khalino Khalino (Kursk Oblast)
- Coordinates: 51°44′53″N 36°20′36″E
- Country: Russia
- Federal subject: Kursk Oblast
- Administrative district: Kursky District
- SelsovietSelsoviet: Klyukvinsky

Population (2010 Census)
  - Total: 2,268
  - Estimate (2010): 2,268 (0%)

Municipal status
  - Municipal district: Kursky Municipal District
  - Rural settlement: Klyukvinsky Selsoviet Rural Settlement
- Time zone: UTC+3 (MSK)
- Postal code: 305545
- Dialing code: +7 4712
- OKTMO ID: 38620428126
- Website: klukva.rkursk.ru

Khalino (Russian: Халино) is a rural locality (Russian: деревня, lit. 'village') in Klyukvinsky Selsoviet Rural Settlement, Kursky District, Kursk Oblast, Russia. Population: 2,268 (2010 census); 2,503 (2002 census);

== Geography ==
The village is located in the Seym River basin (a left tributary of the Desna), 102 km from the Russia–Ukraine border, 4 km east of the district center – the town Kursk, 3 km from the selsoviet center – Dolgoye.

Streets

There are the following streets in the locality: Achkasova and Ryabinovaya (268 houses).

Climate

Khalino has a warm-summer humid continental climate (Dfb in the Köppen climate classification).

Climate data for Khalino
Month	Jan	Feb	Mar	Apr	May	Jun	Jul	Aug	Sep	Oct	Nov	Dec	Year
Mean daily maximum °C (°F)	−4.2 (24.4)	−3.2 (26.2)	2.7 (36.9)	13 (55)	19.4 (66.9)	22.7 (72.9)	25.4 (77.7)	24.7 (76.5)	18.2 (64.8)	10.5 (50.9)	3.3 (37.9)	−1.3 (29.7)	10.9 (51.7)
Daily mean °C (°F)	−6.3 (20.7)	−5.8 (21.6)	−0.9 (30.4)	8.2 (46.8)	14.7 (58.5)	18.4 (65.1)	21 (70)	20.1 (68.2)	14 (57)	7.2 (45.0)	1 (34)	−3.2 (26.2)	7.4 (45.3)
Mean daily minimum °C (°F)	−8.8 (16.2)	−8.9 (16.0)	−5 (23)	2.6 (36.7)	9 (48)	13 (55)	15.8 (60.4)	14.9 (58.8)	9.7 (49.5)	3.9 (39.0)	−1.3 (29.7)	−5.4 (22.3)	3.3 (37.9)
Average precipitation mm (inches)	51 (2.0)	44 (1.7)	47 (1.9)	50 (2.0)	60 (2.4)	68 (2.7)	70 (2.8)	55 (2.2)	59 (2.3)	59 (2.3)	46 (1.8)	48 (1.9)	657 (26)
Source: https://en.climate-data.org/asia/russian-federation/kursk-oblast/халино-510262/

== Transport ==
Khalino is located 2.5 km from the federal route P-298 (Kursk – Voronezh – P-22 "Kaspy" Highway; a part of the European route E38), on the road of intermunicipal significance 38H-821 (R-298 – Khalino), 4 km from the nearest railway halt 13 km (railway line Kursk – 146 km).

The rural locality is situated 3 km from Kursk Vostochny Airport, 122 km from Belgorod International Airport and 199 km from Voronezh Peter the Great Airport.
