= Khvostovo =

Khvostovo (Russian: Хвостово) is the name of several rural localities in Russia:

- Khvostovo, Kursk Oblast, village in Polevskoy Selsoviet Rural Settlement, Kursky District, Kursk Oblast
- Khvostovo, Vladimir Oblast, village in Kiprevskoye Rural Settlement, Kirzhachsky District, Vladimir Oblast
- Khvostovo, Beketovskoye Rural Settlement, Vozhegodsky District, Vologda Oblast, village in Beketovskoye Rural Settlement, Vozhegodsky District, Vologda Oblast
- Khvostovo, Yuchkinskoye Rural Settlement, Vozhegodsky District, Vologda Oblast, village in Yuchkinskoye Rural Settlement, Vozhegodsky District, Vologda Oblast
