= Verkhneye Gutorovo =

Rural locality in Kursk Oblast, Russia

Verkhneye Gutorovo Верхнее Гуторово
- Selo
- Interactive map of Verkhneye Gutorovo
- Location of Verkhneye Gutorovo Verkhneye Gutorovo (Kursk Oblast)
- Coordinates: 51°35′39″N 36°33′57″E
- Country: Russia
- Federal subject: Kursk Oblast
- Administrative district: Kursky District
- SelsovietSelsoviet: Polevskoy

Population (2010 Census)
  - Total: 479
  - Estimate (2010): 479 (0%)

Municipal status
  - Municipal district: Kursky Municipal District
  - Rural settlement: Polevskoy Selsoviet Rural Settlement
- Time zone: UTC+3 (MSK)
- Postal code: 305540
- Dialing code: +7 4712
- OKTMO ID: 38620468106
- Website: polevaya.rkursk.ru

Verkhneye Gutorovo (Russian: Верхнее Гуторово) is a rural locality (Russian: село, lit. 'village') in Polevskoy Selsoviet Rural Settlement, Kursky District, Kursk Oblast, Russia. Population: 479 (2010 census); 522 (2002 census);

== Geography ==
The village is located on the Seym River (a left tributary of the Desna), 101 km from the Russia–Ukraine border, 26 km south-east of the district center – the town Kursk, 4 km from the selsoviet center – Polevaya.

Streets

There are the following streets in the locality: Lugovaya, Naberezhnaya, Shkolnaya and Tsentralnaya (306 houses).

Climate

Verkhneye Gutorovo has a warm-summer humid continental climate (Dfb in the Köppen climate classification).

== Transport ==
Verkhneye Gutorovo is located 9.5 km from the federal route P-298 (Kursk – Voronezh – P-22 "Kaspy" Highway; a part of the European route E38), 4.5 km from the road of regional importance 38K-014 (R-298 – Polevaya), on the road of intermunicipal significance 38H-298 (38K-014 – Verkhneye Gutorovo), in the vicinity of the railway halt Gutorovo (railway line Klyukva — Belgorod).

The rural locality is situated 27 km from Kursk Vostochny Airport, 105 km from Belgorod International Airport and 186 km from Voronezh Peter the Great Airport.
