= Mlodat =

Rural locality in Kursk Oblast, Russia

Mlodat Млодать
- Village
- Interactive map of Mlodat
- Location of Mlodat Mlodat (Kursk Oblast)
- Coordinates: 51°34′40″N 36°15′55″E
- Country: Russia
- Federal subject: Kursk Oblast
- Administrative district: Kursky District
- SelsovietSelsoviet: Lebyazhensky

Population (2010 Census)
  - Total: 69
  - Estimate (2010): 69 (0%)

Municipal status
  - Municipal district: Kursky Municipal District
  - Rural settlement: Lebyazhensky Selsoviet Rural Settlement
- Time zone: UTC+3 (MSK)
- Postal code: 305526
- Dialing code: +7 4712
- OKTMO ID: 38620432141
- Website: lebajye.rkursk.ru

Mlodat (Russian: Млодать) is a village in Lebyazhensky Selsoviet Rural Settlement, Kursky District, Kursk Oblast, Russia. Population: 69 (2010 census); 107 (2002 census);

== Geography ==
The village is located on the Mlodat River (a left tributary of the Seym), 84 km from the Russia–Ukraine border, 14 km south-east of Kursk, 3 km from the selsoviet center – Cheryomushki.

Climate

Mlodat has a warm-summer humid continental climate (Dfb in the Köppen climate classification).

== Transport ==
Mlodat is located 2.5 km from the road of intermunicipal significance 38H-416 (Kursk – Petrin), 11 km from the nearest railway halt 465 km (railway line Lgov I — Kursk).

The rural locality is situated 19 km from Kursk Vostochny Airport, 105 km from Belgorod International Airport and 206 km from Voronezh Peter the Great Airport.
