= Klyukva =

Rural locality in Kursk Oblast, Russia

Klyukva Клюква
- Selo
- Interactive map of Klyukva
- Location of Klyukva Klyukva (Kursk Oblast)
- Coordinates: 51°42′44″N 36°21′43″E
- Country: Russia
- Federal subject: Kursk Oblast
- Administrative district: Kursky District
- SelsovietSelsoviet: Klyukvinsky

Population (2010 Census)
  - Total: 614
  - Estimate (2010): 614 (0%)

Municipal status
  - Municipal district: Kursky Municipal District
  - Rural settlement: Klyukvinsky Selsoviet Rural Settlement
- Time zone: UTC+3 (MSK)
- Postal code: 305502
- Dialing code: +7 4712
- OKTMO ID: 38620428141
- Website: klukva.rkursk.ru

Klyukva (Russian: Клюква) is a rural locality (Russian: село, lit. 'village') in Klyukvinsky Selsoviet Rural Settlement, Kursky District, Kursk Oblast, Russia. Population: 614 (2010 census); 1,175 (2002 census);

== Geography ==
The village is located on the Seym River (a left tributary of the Desna), 100 km from the Russia–Ukraine border, 7 km east of the district center – the town Kursk, 0.5 km from the selsoviet center – Dolgoye.

Climate

Klyukva has a warm-summer humid continental climate (Dfb in the Köppen climate classification).

Climate data for Klyukva
Month	Jan	Feb	Mar	Apr	May	Jun	Jul	Aug	Sep	Oct	Nov	Dec	Year
Mean daily maximum °C (°F)	−4.2 (24.4)	−3.3 (26.1)	2.6 (36.7)	13 (55)	19.4 (66.9)	22.7 (72.9)	25.4 (77.7)	24.7 (76.5)	18.2 (64.8)	10.5 (50.9)	3.2 (37.8)	−1.3 (29.7)	10.9 (51.6)
Daily mean °C (°F)	−6.3 (20.7)	−5.9 (21.4)	−1 (30)	8.1 (46.6)	14.7 (58.5)	18.3 (64.9)	21 (70)	20 (68)	14 (57)	7.2 (45.0)	1 (34)	−3.2 (26.2)	7.3 (45.2)
Mean daily minimum °C (°F)	−8.9 (16.0)	−9 (16)	−5.2 (22.6)	2.6 (36.7)	8.9 (48.0)	12.9 (55.2)	15.8 (60.4)	14.8 (58.6)	9.6 (49.3)	3.9 (39.0)	−1.3 (29.7)	−5.4 (22.3)	3.2 (37.8)
Average precipitation mm (inches)	51 (2.0)	44 (1.7)	47 (1.9)	50 (2.0)	60 (2.4)	68 (2.7)	70 (2.8)	55 (2.2)	59 (2.3)	59 (2.3)	46 (1.8)	48 (1.9)	657 (26)
Source: https://en.climate-data.org/asia/russian-federation/kursk-oblast/клюква-319136/

== Transport ==
Klyukva is located 1 km from the federal route P-298 (Kursk – Voronezh – P-22 "Kaspy" Highway; a part of the European route E38), on the road of intermunicipal significance 38H-278 (R-298 – Klyukva – Yakunino), 4 km from the nearest railway station Konaryovo (railway line Klyukva — Belgorod).

The rural locality is situated 7 km from Kursk Vostochny Airport, 118 km from Belgorod International Airport and 198 km from Voronezh Peter the Great Airport.
