= Selikhovy Dvory =

Rural locality in Kursk Oblast, Russia

Selikhovy Dvory Селиховы Дворы
- Village
- Interactive map of Selikhovy Dvory
- Location of Selikhovy Dvory Selikhovy Dvory (Kursk Oblast)
- Coordinates: 51°34′39″N 36°04′43″E
- Country: Russia
- Federal subject: Kursk Oblast
- Administrative district: Kursky District
- SelsovietSelsoviet: Novoposelenovsky

Population (2010 Census)
  - Total: 542
  - Estimate (2010): 542 (0%)

Municipal status
  - Municipal district: Kursky Municipal District
  - Rural settlement: Novoposelenovsky Selsoviet Rural Settlement
- Time zone: UTC+3 (MSK)
- Postal code: 305528
- Dialing code: +7 4712
- OKTMO ID: 38620452136
- Website: novoposel.rkursk.ru

Selikhovy Dvory (Russian: Селиховы Дворы) is a rural locality (Russian: деревня, lit. 'village') in Novoposelenovsky Selsoviet Rural Settlement, Kursky District, Kursk Oblast, Russia. Population: 542 (2010 census); 444 (2002 census);

== Geography ==
The village is located 74 km from the Russia–Ukraine border, 16 km south-west of Kursk, 6 km from the selsoviet center – 1st Tsvetovo.

Streets

There are the following streets in the locality: Gorodskaya, Druzhby, Molodyozhnaya, Okruzhnaya and Tsentralnaya (184 houses).

Climate

Selikhovy Dvory has a warm-summer humid continental climate (Dfb in the Köppen climate classification).

Climate data for Selikhovy Dvory
Month	Jan	Feb	Mar	Apr	May	Jun	Jul	Aug	Sep	Oct	Nov	Dec	Year
Mean daily maximum °C (°F)	−4.1 (24.6)	−3.1 (26.4)	2.8 (37.0)	13 (55)	19.4 (66.9)	22.7 (72.9)	25.3 (77.5)	24.6 (76.3)	18.2 (64.8)	10.6 (51.1)	3.4 (38.1)	−1.2 (29.8)	11.0 (51.7)
Daily mean °C (°F)	−6.2 (20.8)	−5.6 (21.9)	−0.7 (30.7)	8.2 (46.8)	14.7 (58.5)	18.4 (65.1)	20.9 (69.6)	20 (68)	14 (57)	7.3 (45.1)	1.1 (34.0)	−3.1 (26.4)	7.4 (45.3)
Mean daily minimum °C (°F)	−8.6 (16.5)	−8.7 (16.3)	−4.7 (23.5)	2.7 (36.9)	9.1 (48.4)	13 (55)	15.9 (60.6)	14.9 (58.8)	9.7 (49.5)	4 (39)	−1.2 (29.8)	−5.3 (22.5)	3.4 (38.1)
Average precipitation mm (inches)	51 (2.0)	44 (1.7)	47 (1.9)	49 (1.9)	62 (2.4)	69 (2.7)	73 (2.9)	55 (2.2)	57 (2.2)	57 (2.2)	46 (1.8)	49 (1.9)	659 (25.8)
Source: https://en.climate-data.org/asia/russian-federation/kursk-oblast/селиховы-дворы-290742/

== Transport ==
Selikhovy Dvory is located on the federal route M-2 Crimea Highway (a part of the European route E105) and on the road of regional importance 38K-010 ("Crimea Highway" – Ivanino, part of the European route E38), 8 km from the nearest railway halt 457 km (railway line Lgov I — Kursk).

The rural locality is situated 24 km from Kursk Vostochny Airport, 108 km from Belgorod International Airport and 220 km from Voronezh Peter the Great Airport.
