= Zvyagintsevo =

Zvyagintsevo (Russian: Звягинцево), rural localities in Russia, may refer to:

- Zvyagintsevo, Kaliningrad Oblast, a settlement
- Zvyagintsevo, Kursky District, Kursk Oblast, a village
- Zvyagintsevo, Vyshnereutchansky Selsoviet, Medvensky District, Kursk Oblast, a khutor
- Zvyagintsevo, Vysoksky Selsoviet, Medvensky District, Kursk Oblast, a village
- Zvyagintsevo, Oryol Oblast, a village

See also

- Zvyagintsev
