= Khvoshchin =

Rural locality in Kursk Oblast, Russia

Khvoshchin Хвощин
- Khutor
- Interactive map of Khvoshchin
- Location of Khvoshchin Khvoshchin (Kursk Oblast)
- Coordinates: 51°34′54″N 36°13′44″E
- Country: Russia
- Federal subject: Kursk Oblast
- Administrative district: Kursky District
- SelsovietSelsoviet: Lebyazhensky

Population (2010 Census)
  - Total: 123
  - Estimate (2010): 123 (0%)

Municipal status
  - Municipal district: Kursky Municipal District
  - Rural settlement: Lebyazhensky Selsoviet Rural Settlement
- Time zone: UTC+3 (MSK)
- Postal code: 305526
- Dialing code: +7 4712
- OKTMO ID: 38620432191
- Website: lebajye.rkursk.ru

Khvoshchin (Russian: Хвощин) is a rural locality (a khutor) in Lebyazhensky Selsoviet Rural Settlement, Kursky District, Kursk Oblast, Russia. Population: 123 (2010 census); 131 (2002 census);

== Geography ==
The khutor is located in the Mlodat River basin (a left tributary of the Seym), 82 km from the Russia–Ukraine border, 13 km south-east of Kursk, 2.5 km from the selsoviet center – Cheryomushki.

Khvoshchin has a warm-summer humid continental climate (Dfb in the Köppen climate classification).

== Transport ==
Khvoshchin is located on the road of intermunicipal significance 38H-416 (Kursk – Petrin), 10 km from the nearest railway halt 465 km (railway line Lgov I — Kursk).

The rural locality is situated 20 km from Kursk Vostochny Airport, 106 km from Belgorod International Airport and 209 km from Voronezh Peter the Great Airport.
