= Semyonovka, Lebyazhensky selsoviet, Kursky District, Kursk Oblast =

Rural locality in Kursk Oblast, Russia

Semyonovka Семёновка
- Village
- Interactive map of Semyonovka
- Location of Semyonovka Semyonovka (Kursk Oblast)
- Coordinates: 51°34′04″N 36°15′28″E
- Country: Russia
- Federal subject: Kursk Oblast
- Administrative district: Kursky District
- SelsovietSelsoviet: Lebyazhensky

Population (2010 Census)
  - Total: 12
  - Estimate (2010): 12 (0%)

Municipal status
  - Municipal district: Kursky Municipal District
  - Rural settlement: Lebyazhensky Selsoviet Rural Settlement
- Time zone: UTC+3 (MSK)
- Postal code: 305526
- Dialing code: +7 4712
- OKTMO ID: 38620432171
- Website: lebajye.rkursk.ru

Semyonovka (Russian: Семёновка) is a rural locality (Russian: деревня, lit. 'village') in Lebyazhensky Selsoviet Rural Settlement, Kursky District, Kursk Oblast, Russia. Population: 12 (2010 census); 12 (2002 census);

== Geography ==
The village is located on the Mlodat River (a left tributary of the Seym), 83 km from the Russia–Ukraine border, 15 km south-east of Kursk, 4 km from the selsoviet center – Cheryomushki.

Climate

Semyonovka has a warm-summer humid continental climate (Dfb in the Köppen climate classification).

== Transport ==
Semyonovka is located 2.5 km from the road of intermunicipal significance 38H-416 (Kursk – Petrin), 12 km from the nearest railway halt 465 km (railway line Lgov I — Kursk).

The rural locality is situated 21.5 km from Kursk Vostochny Airport, 103 km from Belgorod International Airport and 207 km from Voronezh Peter the Great Airport.
