= Yakunino, Kursk Oblast =

Rural locality in Kursk Oblast, Russia

Yakunino Якунино
- Village
- Interactive map of Yakunino
- Location of Yakunino Yakunino (Kursk Oblast)
- Coordinates: 51°41′40″N 36°23′35″E
- Country: Russia
- Federal subject: Kursk Oblast
- Administrative district: Kursky District
- SelsovietSelsoviet: Klyukvinsky

Population (2010 Census)
  - Total: 135
  - Estimate (2010): 135 (0%)

Municipal status
  - Municipal district: Kursky Municipal District
  - Rural settlement: Klyukvinsky Selsoviet Rural Settlement
- Time zone: UTC+3 (MSK)
- Postal code: 305502
- Dialing code: +7 4712
- OKTMO ID: 38620428131
- Website: klukva.rkursk.ru

Yakunino (Russian: Якунино) is a rural locality (Russian: деревня, lit. 'village') in Klyukvinsky Selsoviet Rural Settlement, Kursky District, Kursk Oblast, Russia. Population: 135 (2010 census); 124 (2002 census);

== Geography ==
The village is located on the Seym River (a left tributary of the Desna), 101 km from the Russia–Ukraine border, 10 km east of the district center – the town Kursk, 3.5 km from the selsoviet center – Dolgoye.

Climate

Yakunino has a warm-summer humid continental climate (Dfb in the Köppen climate classification).

== Transport ==
Yakunino is located 3 km from the federal route P-298 (Kursk – Voronezh – P-22 "Kaspy" Highway; a part of the European route E38), on the road of intermunicipal significance 38H-278 (R-298 – Klyukva – Yakunino), 4 km from the nearest railway station Konaryovo (railway line Klyukva — Belgorod).

The rural locality is situated 10 km from Kursk Vostochny Airport, 116 km from Belgorod International Airport and 196 km from Voronezh Peter the Great Airport.
