= 2nd Bukreyevo =

Rural locality in Kursk Oblast, Russia

2nd Bukreyevo 2-е Букреево
- Village
- Interactive map of 2nd Bukreyevo
- Location of 2nd Bukreyevo 2nd Bukreyevo (Kursk Oblast)
- Coordinates: 51°36′03″N 36°19′44″E
- Country: Russia
- Federal subject: Kursk Oblast
- Administrative district: Kursky District
- SelsovietSelsoviet: Lebyazhensky

Population (2010 Census)
  - Total: 46
  - Estimate (2010): 46 (0%)

Municipal status
  - Municipal district: Kursky Municipal District
  - Rural settlement: Lebyazhensky Selsoviet Rural Settlement
- Time zone: UTC+3 (MSK)
- Postal code: 305526
- Dialing code: +7 4712
- OKTMO ID: 38620432121
- Website: lebajye.rkursk.ru

2nd Bukreyevo or Vtoroye Bukreyevo (Russian: 2-е Букреево, Второе Букреево) is a rural locality (Russian: деревня, lit. 'village') in Lebyazhensky Selsoviet Rural Settlement, Kursky District, Kursk Oblast, Russia. Population: 46 (2010 census); 58 (2002 census);

== Geography ==
The village is located on the Mlodat River (a left tributary of the Seym), 89 km from the Russia–Ukraine border, 14 km south-east of Kursk, 5 km from the selsoviet center – Cheryomushki.

Climate

2nd Bukreyevo has a warm-summer humid continental climate (Dfb in the Köppen climate classification).

== Transport ==
2nd Bukreyevo is located 6 km from the road of intermunicipal significance 38H-416 (Kursk – Petrin), on the road 38H-048 (2nd Bukreyevo – Khoruzhevka – Smorodnoye), 7 km from the nearest railway halt Zaplava (railway line Klyukva — Belgorod).

The rural locality is situated 18 km from Kursk Vostochny Airport, 106 km from Belgorod International Airport and 202 km from Voronezh Peter the Great Airport.
