= Rassylnaya, Kursk Oblast =

Rural locality in Kursk Oblast, Russia

Rassylnaya Рассыльная
- Village
- Interactive map of Rassylnaya
- Location of Rassylnaya Rassylnaya (Kursk Oblast)
- Coordinates: 51°39′08″N 36°01′35″E
- Country: Russia
- Federal subject: Kursk Oblast
- Administrative district: Kursky District
- SelsovietSelsoviet: Voroshnevsky

Population (2010 Census)
  - Total: 866
  - Estimate (2010): 866 (0%)

Municipal status
  - Municipal district: Kursky Municipal District
  - Rural settlement: Voroshnevsky Selsoviet Rural Settlement
- Time zone: UTC+3 (MSK)
- Postal code: 305527
- Dialing code: +7 4712
- OKTMO ID: 38620424111
- Website: voroshnevo.rkursk.ru

Rassylnaya (Russian: Рассыльная) is a rural locality (Russian: деревня, lit. 'village') in Voroshnevsky Selsoviet Rural Settlement, Kursky District, Kursk Oblast, Russia. Population: 866 (2010 census); 870 (2002 census);

== Geography ==
The village is located on the Seym River (a left tributary of the Desna), 78 km from the Russia–Ukraine border, 12 km south-west of Kursk, at the western border of the selsoviet center – Voroshnevo.

Streets

There are the following streets in the locality: Lugovaya, Molodyozhnaya, Novaya, Sovkhoznaya, Tsentralnaya, Yubileynaya and Yasnaya (294 houses).

Climate

Rassylnaya has a warm-summer humid continental climate (Dfb in the Köppen climate classification).

Climate data for Rassylnaya
Month	Jan	Feb	Mar	Apr	May	Jun	Jul	Aug	Sep	Oct	Nov	Dec	Year
Mean daily maximum °C (°F)	−4.2 (24.4)	−3.2 (26.2)	2.7 (36.9)	13 (55)	19.4 (66.9)	22.7 (72.9)	25.3 (77.5)	24.7 (76.5)	18.2 (64.8)	10.5 (50.9)	3.3 (37.9)	−1.2 (29.8)	10.9 (51.6)
Daily mean °C (°F)	−6.2 (20.8)	−5.7 (21.7)	−0.8 (30.6)	8.2 (46.8)	14.8 (58.6)	18.4 (65.1)	21 (70)	20.1 (68.2)	14 (57)	7.3 (45.1)	1.1 (34.0)	−3.2 (26.2)	7.4 (45.3)
Mean daily minimum °C (°F)	−8.7 (16.3)	−8.8 (16.2)	−4.9 (23.2)	2.7 (36.9)	9.1 (48.4)	13.1 (55.6)	15.9 (60.6)	14.9 (58.8)	9.8 (49.6)	3.9 (39.0)	−1.2 (29.8)	−5.4 (22.3)	3.4 (38.1)
Average precipitation mm (inches)	51 (2.0)	45 (1.8)	47 (1.9)	50 (2.0)	62 (2.4)	71 (2.8)	73 (2.9)	55 (2.2)	59 (2.3)	59 (2.3)	47 (1.9)	49 (1.9)	668 (26.4)
Source: https://en.climate-data.org/asia/russian-federation/kursk-oblast/рассыльная-664423/

== Transport ==
Rassylnaya is located 3 km from the federal route M-2 Crimea Highway (a part of the European route E105), on the road of regional importance 38K-017 (Kursk – Lgov – Rylsk – border with Ukraine), 5 km from the nearest railway station Dyakonovo (railway line Lgov I — Kursk).

The rural locality is situated 21 km from Kursk Vostochny Airport, 117 km from Belgorod International Airport and 222 km from Voronezh Peter the Great Airport.
