= Novosyolovsky =

Novosyolovsky (Russian: Новосёловский; masculine), Novosyolovskaya (Новосёловская; feminine), or Novosyolovskoye (Новосёловское; neuter) is the name of several rural localities in Russia:

- Novosyolovsky, Kursk Oblast, a settlement in Kursky District of Kursk Oblast
- Novosyolovsky, Krasnodar Krai, a khutor in Belorechensky District of Krasnodar Krai
- Novosyolovskoye, a village under the administrative jurisdiction of the urban-type settlement of Ponazyrevo, Kostroma Oblast
