= Dukhovets, Voroshnevsky selsoviet, Kursky District, Kursk Oblast =

Rural locality in Kursk Oblast, Russia

Dukhovets Духовец
- Khutor
- Interactive map of Dukhovets
- Location of Dukhovets Dukhovets (Kursk Oblast)
- Coordinates: 51°38′19″N 36°03′46″E
- Country: Russia
- Federal subject: Kursk Oblast
- Administrative district: Kursky District
- SelsovietSelsoviet: Voroshnevsky

Population (2010 Census)
  - Total: 190
  - Estimate (2010): 190 (0%)

Municipal status
  - Municipal district: Kursky Municipal District
  - Rural settlement: Voroshnevsky Selsoviet Rural Settlement
- Time zone: UTC+3 (MSK)
- Postal code: 305527
- Dialing code: +7 4712
- OKTMO ID: 38620424106
- Website: voroshnevo.rkursk.ru

Dukhovets (Russian: Духовец) is a rural locality (a khutor) in Voroshnevsky Selsoviet Rural Settlement, Kursky District, Kursk Oblast, Russia. Population: 190 (2010 census); 205 (2002 census);

== Geography ==
The khutor is located 79 km from the Russia–Ukraine border, 12 km south-west of Kursk, 1.5 km from the selsoviet center – Voroshnevo.

Streets

There are the following streets in the locality: Simferopolskaya, Solnechnaya 1-ya and Solnechnaya 2-ya (174 houses).

Climate

Dukhovets has a warm-summer humid continental climate (Dfb in the Köppen climate classification).

== Transport ==
Dukhovets is located on the federal route M-2 Crimea Highway (a part of the European route E105), 5 km from the nearest railway station Ryshkovo (railway line Lgov I — Kursk).

The rural locality is situated 20 km from Kursk Vostochny Airport, 115 km from Belgorod International Airport and 220 km from Voronezh Peter the Great Airport.
