= Khoruzhevka =

Rural locality in Kursk Oblast, Russia

Khoruzhevka Хоружевка
- Khutor
- Interactive map of Khoruzhevka
- Location of Khoruzhevka Khoruzhevka (Kursk Oblast)
- Coordinates: 51°34′28″N 36°16′41″E
- Country: Russia
- Federal subject: Kursk Oblast
- Administrative district: Kursky District
- SelsovietSelsoviet: Lebyazhensky

Population (2010 Census)
  - Total: 34
  - Estimate (2010): 34 (0%)

Municipal status
  - Municipal district: Kursky Municipal District
  - Rural settlement: Lebyazhensky Selsoviet Rural Settlement
- Time zone: UTC+3 (MSK)
- Postal code: 305526
- Dialing code: +7 4712
- OKTMO ID: 38620432196
- Website: lebajye.rkursk.ru

Khoruzhevka (Russian: Хоружевка) is a rural locality (a khutor) in Lebyazhensky Selsoviet Rural Settlement, Kursky District, Kursk Oblast, Russia. Population: 34 (2010 census); 39 (2002 census);

== Geography ==
The khutor is located on the Mlodat River (a left tributary of the Seym), 85 km from the Russia–Ukraine border, 14 km south-east of Kursk, 3 km from the selsoviet center – Cheryomushki.

Climate

Khoruzhevka has a warm-summer humid continental climate (Dfb in the Köppen climate classification).

== Transport ==
Khoruzhevka is located 3.5 km from the road of intermunicipal significance 38H-416 (Kursk – Petrin), on the road 38H-048 (2nd Bukreyevo – Khoruzhevka – Smorodnoye), 12 km from the nearest railway halt 465 km (railway line Lgov I — Kursk).

The rural locality is situated 20 km from Kursk Vostochny Airport, 104 km from Belgorod International Airport and 205 km from Voronezh Peter the Great Airport.
