= Demino, Kursk Oblast =

Rural locality in Kursk Oblast, Russia

Demino Демино
- Selo
- Interactive map of Demino
- Location of Demino Demino (Kursk Oblast)
- Coordinates: 51°35′16″N 36°36′29″E
- Country: Russia
- Federal subject: Kursk Oblast
- Administrative district: Kursky District
- SelsovietSelsoviet: Polevskoy

Population (2010 Census)
  - Total: 115
  - Estimate (2010): 115 (0%)

Municipal status
  - Municipal district: Kursky Municipal District
  - Rural settlement: Polevskoy Selsoviet Rural Settlement
- Time zone: UTC+3 (MSK)
- Postal code: 305543
- Dialing code: +7 4712
- OKTMO ID: 38620468131
- Website: polevaya.rkursk.ru

Demino (Russian: Демино) is a rural locality (Russian: село, lit. 'village') in Polevskoy Selsoviet Rural Settlement, Kursky District, Kursk Oblast, Russia. Population: 115 (2010 census); 143 (2002 census);

== Geography ==
The village is located on the Seym River (a left tributary of the Desna), 103 km from the Russia–Ukraine border, 30 km south-east of the district center – the town Kursk, 7 km from the selsoviet center – Polevaya.

Climate

Demino has a warm-summer humid continental climate (Dfb in the Köppen climate classification).

== Transport ==
Demino is located 10 km from the federal route P-298 (Kursk – Voronezh – P-22 "Kaspy" Highway; a part of the European route E38), 2 km from the road of regional importance 38K-019 (Kursk – Bolshoye Shumakovo – Polevaya via Lebyazhye), 7.5 km from the road 38K-014 (R-298 – Polevaya), on the road of intermunicipal significance 38H-299 (38K-014 – Demino), 2.5 km from the nearest railway halt Krasnikovo (railway line Klyukva — Belgorod).

The rural locality is situated 30 km from Kursk Vostochny Airport, 104 km from Belgorod International Airport and 182 km from Voronezh Peter the Great Airport.
