= Zorino, Ryshkovsky selsoviet, Kursky District, Kursk Oblast =

Rural locality in Kursk Oblast, Russia

Zorino Зорино
- Village
- Interactive map of Zorino
- Location of Zorino Zorino (Kursk Oblast)
- Coordinates: 51°40′33″N 36°12′37″E
- Country: Russia
- Federal subject: Kursk Oblast
- Administrative district: Kursky District
- SelsovietSelsoviet: Ryshkovsky

Population (2010 Census)
  - Total: 1,000
  - Estimate (2010): 1,000 (0%)

Municipal status
  - Municipal district: Kursky Municipal District
  - Rural settlement: Ryshkovsky Selsoviet Rural Settlement
- Time zone: UTC+3 (MSK)
- Postal code: 305524
- Dialing code: +7 4712
- OKTMO ID: 38620476111
- Website: rishkovo.rkursk.ru

Zorino (Russian: Зорино) is a rural locality (Russian: деревня, lit. 'village') in Ryshkovsky Selsoviet Rural Settlement, Kursky District, Kursk Oblast, Russia. Population: 1,000 (2010 census); 953 (2002 census);

== Geography ==
The village is located on the Seym River (a left tributary of the Desna), 89 km from the Russia–Ukraine border, at the southern border of Kursk, 1 km from the selsoviet center – Ryshkovo.

Streets

There are the following streets in the locality: Betonnaya, Dobraya, Druzhnaya, Ivovaya, Khvoynaya, Lesnaya, Peski, Pridorozhnaya, Solovyinaya, Sosnovaya, Tsentralnaya, Verbnaya, Zheleznodorozhnaya and Zolotoy kolos (421 houses).

Climate

Zorino has a warm-summer humid continental climate (Dfb in the Köppen climate classification).

Climate data for Zorino
Month	Jan	Feb	Mar	Apr	May	Jun	Jul	Aug	Sep	Oct	Nov	Dec	Year
Mean daily maximum °C (°F)	−4.2 (24.4)	−3.2 (26.2)	2.7 (36.9)	13 (55)	19.4 (66.9)	22.7 (72.9)	25.4 (77.7)	24.7 (76.5)	18.2 (64.8)	10.5 (50.9)	3.3 (37.9)	−1.2 (29.8)	10.9 (51.7)
Daily mean °C (°F)	−6.2 (20.8)	−5.7 (21.7)	−0.9 (30.4)	8.2 (46.8)	14.8 (58.6)	18.4 (65.1)	21 (70)	20.1 (68.2)	14 (57)	7.2 (45.0)	1.1 (34.0)	−3.2 (26.2)	7.4 (45.3)
Mean daily minimum °C (°F)	−8.8 (16.2)	−8.8 (16.2)	−5 (23)	2.7 (36.9)	9.1 (48.4)	13.1 (55.6)	15.9 (60.6)	14.9 (58.8)	9.7 (49.5)	3.9 (39.0)	−1.3 (29.7)	−5.4 (22.3)	3.3 (38.0)
Average precipitation mm (inches)	51 (2.0)	44 (1.7)	47 (1.9)	50 (2.0)	60 (2.4)	68 (2.7)	70 (2.8)	55 (2.2)	59 (2.3)	59 (2.3)	46 (1.8)	48 (1.9)	657 (26)
Source: https://en.climate-data.org/asia/russian-federation/kursk-oblast/зорино-666131/

== Transport ==
Zorino is located on the roads of regional importance 38K-015 (Kursk – Zorino – Tolmachyovo) and 38K-041 (bypassing the village of Zorino, part of the European route E38), in the vicinity of the railway halt 465 km and railway junction 470 km (railway line Lgov I — Kursk).

The rural locality is situated 8 km from Kursk Vostochny Airport, 116 km from Belgorod International Airport and 208 km from Voronezh Peter the Great Airport.
