= Novoposelenovka =

Rural locality in Kursk Oblast, Russia

Novoposelenovka Новопоселеновка
- Village
- Interactive map of Novoposelenovka
- Location of Novoposelenovka Novoposelenovka (Kursk Oblast)
- Coordinates: 51°38′42″N 36°05′45″E
- Country: Russia
- Federal subject: Kursk Oblast
- Administrative district: Kursky District
- SelsovietSelsoviet: Novoposelenovsky

Population (2010 Census)
  - Total: 576
  - Estimate (2010): 576 (0%)

Municipal status
  - Municipal district: Kursky Municipal District
  - Rural settlement: Novoposelenovsky Selsoviet Rural Settlement
- Time zone: UTC+3 (MSK)
- Postal code: 305523
- Dialing code: +7 4712
- OKTMO ID: 38620452131
- Website: novoposel.rkursk.ru

Novoposelenovka (Russian: Новопоселеновка) is a rural locality (Russian: деревня, lit. 'village') in Novoposelenovsky Selsoviet Rural Settlement, Kursky District, Kursk Oblast, Russia. Population: 576 (2010 census); 566 (2002 census);

== Geography ==
The village is located 81 km from the Russia–Ukraine border, 8 km south-west of Kursk, at the northern border of the selsoviet center – 1st Tsvetovo.

Streets

There are two streets in the locality: Druzhby and Mirnaya (226 houses).

Climate

Novoposelenovka has a warm-summer humid continental climate (Dfb in the Köppen climate classification).

Climate data for Novoposelenovka
Month	Jan	Feb	Mar	Apr	May	Jun	Jul	Aug	Sep	Oct	Nov	Dec	Year
Mean daily maximum °C (°F)	−4.1 (24.6)	−3.1 (26.4)	2.8 (37.0)	13 (55)	19.4 (66.9)	22.7 (72.9)	25.3 (77.5)	24.6 (76.3)	18.2 (64.8)	10.6 (51.1)	3.4 (38.1)	−1.2 (29.8)	11.0 (51.7)
Daily mean °C (°F)	−6.2 (20.8)	−5.6 (21.9)	−0.7 (30.7)	8.2 (46.8)	14.7 (58.5)	18.4 (65.1)	20.9 (69.6)	20 (68)	14 (57)	7.3 (45.1)	1.1 (34.0)	−3.1 (26.4)	7.4 (45.3)
Mean daily minimum °C (°F)	−8.6 (16.5)	−8.7 (16.3)	−4.7 (23.5)	2.7 (36.9)	9.1 (48.4)	13 (55)	15.9 (60.6)	14.9 (58.8)	9.7 (49.5)	4 (39)	−1.2 (29.8)	−5.3 (22.5)	3.4 (38.1)
Average precipitation mm (inches)	51 (2.0)	45 (1.8)	47 (1.9)	50 (2.0)	62 (2.4)	71 (2.8)	73 (2.9)	55 (2.2)	59 (2.3)	59 (2.3)	47 (1.9)	49 (1.9)	668 (26.4)
Source: https://en.climate-data.org/asia/russian-federation/kursk-oblast/новопоселеновка-666113/

== Transport ==
Novoposelenovka is located 1.5 km from the federal route M-2 Crimea Highway (a part of the European route E105), on the road of intermunicipal significance 38H-234 ("Crimea Highway" – 1st Tsvetovo – Novoposelenovka), in the vicinity of the nearest railway halt 457 km (railway line Lgov I — Kursk).

The rural locality is situated 18 km from Kursk Vostochny Airport, 115 km from Belgorod International Airport and 217 km from Voronezh Peter the Great Airport.
