= Ryshkovo, Kursky District, Kursk Oblast =

Rural locality in Kursk Oblast, Russia

Ryshkovo Рышково
- Selo
- Interactive map of Ryshkovo
- Location of Ryshkovo Ryshkovo (Kursk Oblast)
- Coordinates: 51°39′52″N 36°10′42″E
- Country: Russia
- Federal subject: Kursk Oblast
- Administrative district: Kursky District
- SelsovietSelsoviet: Ryshkovsky

Population (2010 Census)
  - Total: 1,216
  - Estimate (2010): 1,216 (0%)

Administrative status
  - Capital of: Ryshkovsky Selsoviet

Municipal status
  - Municipal district: Kursky Municipal District
  - Rural settlement: Ryshkovsky Selsoviet Rural Settlement
  - Capital of: Ryshkovsky Selsoviet Rural Settlement
- Time zone: UTC+3 (MSK)
- Postal code: 305524
- Dialing code: +7 4712
- OKTMO ID: 38620476101
- Website: rishkovo.rkursk.ru

Ryshkovo (Russian: Рышково) is a rural locality (Russian: село, lit. 'village') and the administrative center of Ryshkovsky Selsoviet Rural Settlement, Kursky District, Kursk Oblast, Russia. Population: 1,216 (2010 census); 1,463 (2002 census);

== Geography ==
The village is located in the Seym River basin (a left tributary of the Desna), 87 km from the Russia–Ukraine border, at the southern border of Kursk.

Streets

There are the following streets in the locality: 1-ya Solovyevka, 2-ya Solovyevka, 3-ya Solovyevka, Garazhnaya, Lugovaya, Pansionat imeni Chernyakhovskogo, Polevaya, proyezd 1-y Shkolny, proyezd 2-y Shkolny, Solnechnaya, Tenistaya, Tsentralnaya, Shkolnaya and Zarechnaya (471 houses).

Climate

Ryshkovo has a warm-summer humid continental climate (Dfb in the Köppen climate classification).

Climate data for Ryshkovo
Month	Jan	Feb	Mar	Apr	May	Jun	Jul	Aug	Sep	Oct	Nov	Dec	Year
Mean daily maximum °C (°F)	−4.2 (24.4)	−3.2 (26.2)	2.7 (36.9)	13 (55)	19.4 (66.9)	22.7 (72.9)	25.4 (77.7)	24.7 (76.5)	18.2 (64.8)	10.5 (50.9)	3.3 (37.9)	−1.2 (29.8)	10.9 (51.7)
Daily mean °C (°F)	−6.2 (20.8)	−5.7 (21.7)	−0.9 (30.4)	8.2 (46.8)	14.8 (58.6)	18.4 (65.1)	21 (70)	20.1 (68.2)	14 (57)	7.2 (45.0)	1.1 (34.0)	−3.2 (26.2)	7.4 (45.3)
Mean daily minimum °C (°F)	−8.8 (16.2)	−8.8 (16.2)	−5 (23)	2.7 (36.9)	9.1 (48.4)	13.1 (55.6)	15.9 (60.6)	14.9 (58.8)	9.7 (49.5)	3.9 (39.0)	−1.3 (29.7)	−5.4 (22.3)	3.3 (38.0)
Average precipitation mm (inches)	51 (2.0)	44 (1.7)	47 (1.9)	50 (2.0)	60 (2.4)	68 (2.7)	70 (2.8)	55 (2.2)	59 (2.3)	59 (2.3)	46 (1.8)	48 (1.9)	657 (26)
Source: https://en.climate-data.org/asia/russian-federation/kursk-oblast/рышково-229398/

== Transport ==
Ryshkovo is located on the road of regional importance 38K-015 (Kursk – Zorino – Tolmachyovo), 3 km from the nearest railway station Ryshkovo (railway line Lgov I — Kursk).

The rural locality is situated 12.5 km from Kursk Vostochny Airport, 115 km from Belgorod International Airport and 211 km from Voronezh Peter the Great Airport.
