= Tolmachyovo, Lebyazhensky selsoviet, Kursky District, Kursk Oblast =

Rural locality in Kursk Oblast, Russia

Tolmachyovo Толмачёво
- Village
- Interactive map of Tolmachyovo
- Location of Tolmachyovo Tolmachyovo (Kursk Oblast)
- Coordinates: 51°41′15″N 36°15′13″E
- Country: Russia
- Federal subject: Kursk Oblast
- Administrative district: Kursky District
- SelsovietSelsoviet: Lebyazhensky

Population (2010 Census)
  - Total: 160
  - Estimate (2010): 160 (0%)

Municipal status
  - Municipal district: Kursky Municipal District
  - Rural settlement: Lebyazhensky Selsoviet Rural Settlement
- Time zone: UTC+3 (MSK)
- Postal code: 305525
- Dialing code: +7 4712
- OKTMO ID: 38620432186
- Website: lebajye.rkursk.ru

Tolmachyovo (Russian: Толмачёво) is a rural locality (Russian: деревня, lit. 'village') in Lebyazhensky Selsoviet Rural Settlement, Kursky District, Kursk Oblast, Russia. Population: 160 (2010 census); 209 (2002 census);

== Geography ==
The village is located on the Seym River (a left tributary of the Desna), 92 km from the Russia–Ukraine border, at the еаstern border of Kursk, 8 km from the selsoviet center – Cheryomushki.

Streets

There are the following streets in the locality: Lesnaya, Lugovaya, Sosnovaya and Yevgeniya Nosova (193 houses).

Climate

Tolmachyovo has a warm-summer humid continental climate (Dfb in the Köppen climate classification).

== Transport ==
Tolmachyovo is located on the road of regional importance 38K-015 (Kursk – Zorino – Tolmachyovo), 2.5 km from the railway junction 470 km (railway line Lgov I — Kursk).

The rural locality is situated 7 km from Kursk Vostochny Airport, 116 km from Belgorod International Airport and 206 km from Voronezh Peter the Great Airport.
