= Zvyagintsevo, Vyshnereutchansky Selsoviet, Medvensky District, Kursk Oblast =

Rural locality in Kursk Oblast, Russia

Zvyagintsevo Звягинцево
- Khutor
- Interactive map of Zvyagintsevo
- Location of Zvyagintsevo Zvyagintsevo (Kursk Oblast)
- Coordinates: 51°19′49″N 35°50′40″E
- Country: Russia
- Federal subject: Kursk Oblast
- Administrative district: Medvensky District
- SelsovietSelsoviet: Vyshnereutchansky

Population (2010 Census)
  - Total: 5
  - Estimate (2010): 5 (0%)

Municipal status
  - Municipal district: Medvensky Municipal District
  - Rural settlement: Vyshnereutchansky Selsoviet Rural Settlement
- Time zone: UTC+3 (MSK)
- Postal code: 307045
- Dialing code: +7 47146
- OKTMO ID: 38624448121
- Website: vishereut.rkursk.ru

Zvyagintsevo (Russian: Звягинцево) is a rural locality (a khutor) in Vyshnereutchansky Selsoviet Rural Settlement, Medvensky District, Kursk Oblast, Russia. Population: 5 (2010 census); 17 (2002 census);

== Geography ==
The khutor is located in the Bely Kolodez Brook basin (a right tributary of the Reut River in the Seym basin), 44 km (27 mi) from the Russia–Ukraine border, 47 km (29 mi) south-west of Kursk, 20 km (12 mi) south-west of the district center – the urban-type settlement Medvenka, 11 km (6.8 mi) from the selsoviet center – Verkhny Reutets.

Climate

Zvyagintsevo has a warm-summer humid continental climate (Dfb in the Köppen climate classification).

== Transport ==
Zvyagintsevo is located 21.5 km (13.4 mi) from the federal route M-2 Crimea Highway (a part of the European route E105), 4 km (2.5 mi) from the road of intermunicipal significance 38H-185 (M2 "Crimea Highway" – Gakhovo), 34 km (21 mi) from the nearest railway halt 439 km (railway line Lgov I — Kursk).

The rural locality is situated 56 km (35 mi) from Kursk Vostochny Airport, 91 km (57 mi) from Belgorod International Airport and 241 km (150 mi) from Voronezh Peter the Great Airport.
