= Khvostovo, Beketovskoye Rural Settlement, Vozhegodsky District, Vologda Oblast =

Khvostovo Хвостово
- Village
- Location within Vologda Oblast Location within Russia
- Coordinates: 60°21′N 39°17′E
- Country: Russia
- Region: Vologda Oblast
- District: Vozhegodsky District
- Time zone: UTC+3:00

Khvostovo (Russian: Хвостово) is a rural locality (a village) in Beketovskoye Rural Settlement, Vozhegodsky District, Vologda Oblast, Russia. The population was 8 as of 2002.

== Geography ==
The distance to Vozhega is 72 km, to Beketovskaya is 17 km. Nikitino, Popovka Kalikinskaya, Petrovo, Chichirino are the nearest rural localities.
