= Solodniki =

Solodniki Солодники
- Selo
- Location within Astrakhan Oblast Location within Russia
- Coordinates: 48°24′N 45°16′E
- Country: Russia
- Region: Astrakhan Oblast
- District: Chernoyarsky District
- Time zone: UTC+4:00

Solodniki (Russian: Солодники) is a rural locality (a selo) and the administrative center of Solodnikovsky Selsoviet, Chernoyarsky District, Astrakhan Oblast, Russia. The population was 1,657 as of 2010. There are 42 streets.

== Geography ==
Solodniki is located on the Volga River, 81 km northwest of Chyorny Yar (the district's administrative centre) by road. Zelyony Sad is the nearest rural locality.
