= Khvostovo, Vladimir Oblast =

Khvostovo Хвостово
- Village
- Location within Vladimir Oblast Location within Russia
- Coordinates: 56°17′N 39°04′E
- Country: Russia
- Region: Vladimir Oblast
- District: Kirzhachsky District
- Time zone: UTC+3:00

Khvostovo (Russian: Хвостово) is a rural locality (a village) in Kiprevskoye Rural Settlement, Kirzhachsky District, Vladimir Oblast, Russia. The population was 1 as of 2010. There is 1 street.

== Geography ==
Khvostovo is located 12 km south of Kirzhach (the district's administrative centre) by road. Ileykino is the nearest rural locality.
