= Zvyagintsevo, Vysoksky Selsoviet, Medvensky District, Kursk Oblast =

Rural locality in Kursk Oblast, Russia

Zvyagintsevo Звягинцево
- Village
- Interactive map of Zvyagintsevo
- Location of Zvyagintsevo Zvyagintsevo (Kursk Oblast)
- Coordinates: 51°26′45″N 35°58′43″E
- Country: Russia
- Federal subject: Kursk Oblast
- Administrative district: Medvensky District
- SelsovietSelsoviet: Vysoksky

Population (2010 Census)
  - Total: 120
  - Estimate (2010): 120 (0%)

Municipal status
  - Municipal district: Medvensky Municipal District
  - Rural settlement: Vysoksky Selsoviet Rural Settlement
- Time zone: UTC+3 (MSK)
- Postal code: 307043
- Dialing code: +7 47146
- OKTMO ID: 38624408146
- Website: visoksk.rkursk.ru

Zvyagintsevo (Russian: Звягинцево) is a rural locality (Russian: деревня, lit. 'village') in Vysoksky Selsoviet Rural Settlement, Medvensky District, Kursk Oblast, Russia. Population: 120 (2010 census); 145 (2002 census);

== Geography ==
The village is located in the Reut River basin (a left tributary of the Seym), 59 km (37 mi) from the Russia–Ukraine border, 32 km (20 mi) south-west of Kursk, 8.5 km (5.3 mi) north-west of the district center – the urban-type settlement Medvenka, 2.5 km (1.6 mi) from the selsoviet center – Vysokoye.

Climate

Zvyagintsevo has a warm-summer humid continental climate (Dfb in the Köppen climate classification).

== Transport ==
Zvyagintsevo is located 8 km (5.0 mi) from the federal route M-2 Crimea Highway (a part of the European route E105), 13.5 km (8.4 mi) from the road of regional importance 38K-004 (Dyakonovo – Sudzha – border with Ukraine), 3.5 km (2.2 mi) from the road 38K-009 (M2 Crimea Highway – 38K-004), on the road of intermunicipal significance 38H-204 (38K-009 – Vysokoye), 22.5 km (14.0 mi) from the nearest railway station Dyakonovo (railway line Lgov I — Kursk).

The rural locality is situated 40 km (25 mi) from Kursk Vostochny Airport, 98 km (61 mi) from Belgorod International Airport and 229 km (142 mi) from Voronezh Peter the Great Airport.
