= Khvostovo, Yuchkinskoye Rural Settlement, Vozhegodsky District, Vologda Oblast =

Khvostovo Хвостово
- Village
- Location within Vologda Oblast Location within Russia
- Coordinates: 60°27′N 40°40′E
- Country: Russia
- Region: Vologda Oblast
- District: Vozhegodsky District
- Time zone: UTC+3:00

Khvostovo (Russian: Хвостово) is a rural locality (a village) in Yuchkinskoye Rural Settlement, Vozhegodsky District, Vologda Oblast, Russia. The population was 41 as of 2002.

== Geography ==
The distance to Vozhega is 30 km, to Yuchka is 6 km. Ivanovskaya, Manuilovskaya, Yuchka are the nearest rural localities.
