= Zamyany =

Zamyany Замьяны
- Selo
- Location within Astrakhan Oblast Location within Russia
- Coordinates: 46°49′N 47°37′E
- Country: Russia
- Region: Astrakhan Oblast
- District: Yenotayevsky District
- Time zone: UTC+4:00

Zamyany (Russian: Замьяны) is a rural locality (a selo) and the administrative center of Zamyansky Selsoviet of Yenotayevsky District, Astrakhan Oblast, Russia. The population was 1,494 as of 2010. There are 32 streets.

== Geography ==
Zamyany is located 76 km southeast of Yenotayevka (the district's administrative centre) by road. Pribrezhny is the nearest rural locality.
