= 1st Tsvetovo =

Rural locality in Kursk Oblast, Russia

1st Tsvetovo 1-е Цветово
- Village
- Interactive map of 1st Tsvetovo
- Location of 1st Tsvetovo 1st Tsvetovo (Kursk Oblast)
- Coordinates: 51°37′53″N 36°06′05″E
- Country: Russia
- Federal subject: Kursk Oblast
- Administrative district: Kursky District
- SelsovietSelsoviet: Novoposelenovsky

Population (2010 Census)
  - Total: 1,151
  - Estimate (2010): 1,151 (0%)

Administrative status
  - Capital of: Novoposelenovsky Selsoviet

Municipal status
  - Municipal district: Kursky Municipal District
  - Rural settlement: Novoposelenovsky Selsoviet Rural Settlement
  - Capital of: Novoposelenovsky Selsoviet Rural Settlement
- Time zone: UTC+3 (MSK)
- Postal code: 305523
- Dialing code: +7 4712
- OKTMO ID: 38620452101
- Website: novoposel.rkursk.ru

1st Tsvetovo or Pervoye Tsvetovo (Russian: 1-е Цветово, Первое Цветово) is a rural locality (Russian: деревня, lit. 'village') and the administrative center of Novoposelenovsky Selsoviet Rural Settlement, Kursky District, Kursk Oblast, Russia. Population: 1,151 (2010 census); 978 (2002 census);

== Geography ==
The village is located 81 km from the Russia–Ukraine border, 11 km south-west of Kursk.

Streets

There are the following streets in the locality: Belgorodsky kvartal, Dachny proyezd, Lugovaya, Novaya, Polevaya, Pridorozhnaya, Sovetskaya, Stepnaya, Shkolnaya, Yunosti and Zarechnaya (418 houses).

Climate

1st Tsvetovo has a warm-summer humid continental climate (Dfb in the Köppen climate classification).

Climate data for 1st Tsvetovo
Month	Jan	Feb	Mar	Apr	May	Jun	Jul	Aug	Sep	Oct	Nov	Dec	Year
Mean daily maximum °C (°F)	−4.1 (24.6)	−3.1 (26.4)	2.8 (37.0)	13 (55)	19.4 (66.9)	22.7 (72.9)	25.3 (77.5)	24.6 (76.3)	18.2 (64.8)	10.6 (51.1)	3.4 (38.1)	−1.2 (29.8)	11.0 (51.7)
Daily mean °C (°F)	−6.2 (20.8)	−5.6 (21.9)	−0.7 (30.7)	8.2 (46.8)	14.7 (58.5)	18.4 (65.1)	20.9 (69.6)	20 (68)	14 (57)	7.3 (45.1)	1.1 (34.0)	−3.1 (26.4)	7.4 (45.3)
Mean daily minimum °C (°F)	−8.6 (16.5)	−8.7 (16.3)	−4.7 (23.5)	2.7 (36.9)	9.1 (48.4)	13 (55)	15.9 (60.6)	14.9 (58.8)	9.7 (49.5)	4 (39)	−1.2 (29.8)	−5.3 (22.5)	3.4 (38.1)
Average precipitation mm (inches)	51 (2.0)	45 (1.8)	47 (1.9)	50 (2.0)	62 (2.4)	71 (2.8)	73 (2.9)	55 (2.2)	59 (2.3)	59 (2.3)	47 (1.9)	49 (1.9)	668 (26.4)
Source: https://en.climate-data.org/asia/russian-federation/kursk-oblast/1-е-цветово-513028/

== Transport ==
1st Tsvetovo is located on the federal route M-2 Crimea Highway (an access road to Kursk, part of the European route E105), on the road of intermunicipal significance 38H-234 ("Crimea Highway" – 1st Tsvetovo – Novoposelenovka), 3.5 km from the nearest railway station Ryshkovo (railway line Lgov I — Kursk).

The rural locality is situated 19 km from Kursk Vostochny Airport, 114 km from Belgorod International Airport and 217 km from Voronezh Peter the Great Airport.
