= Voroshnevo =

Rural locality in Kursk Oblast, Russia

Voroshnevo Ворошнево
- Village
- Interactive map of Voroshnevo
- Location of Voroshnevo Voroshnevo (Kursk Oblast)
- Coordinates: 51°39′14″N 36°02′59″E
- Country: Russia
- Federal subject: Kursk Oblast
- Administrative district: Kursky District
- SelsovietSelsoviet: Voroshnevsky

Population (2010 Census)
  - Total: 3,261
  - Estimate (2021): 3,275 (+0.4%)

Administrative status
  - Capital of: Voroshnevsky Selsoviet

Municipal status
  - Municipal district: Kursky Municipal District
  - Rural settlement: Voroshnevsky Selsoviet Rural Settlement
  - Capital of: Voroshnevsky Selsoviet Rural Settlement
- Time zone: UTC+3 (MSK)
- Postal code: 305527
- Dialing code: +7 4712
- OKTMO ID: 38620424101
- Website: voroshnevo.rkursk.ru

Voroshnevo (Russian: Ворошнево) is a rural locality (Russian: деревня, lit. 'village') and the administrative center of Voroshnevsky Selsoviet Rural Settlement, Kursky District, Kursk Oblast, Russia. Population: 3,275 (2021 census); 3,261 (2010 census); 3,319 (2002 census);

== Geography ==
The village is located on the Seym River (a left tributary of the Desna), 79 km from the Russia–Ukraine border, 11 km south-west of Kursk.

Streets

There are the following streets in the locality: 453–454 km razyezd, Belinskogo, Gazoprovodskaya, Konoplyanka 1-ya, Konoplyanka 2-ya, Konoplyanka 3-ya, Masalova, Mirnaya, Olkhovskaya, Sadovaya, Shirokaya, Sosnovaya, Teplichnaya, Teplichnaya 2-ya and Vatutina (625 houses).

Climate

Voroshnevo has a warm-summer humid continental climate (Dfb in the Köppen climate classification).

Climate data for Voroshnevo
Month	Jan	Feb	Mar	Apr	May	Jun	Jul	Aug	Sep	Oct	Nov	Dec	Year
Mean daily maximum °C (°F)	−4.2 (24.4)	−3.2 (26.2)	2.7 (36.9)	13 (55)	19.4 (66.9)	22.7 (72.9)	25.3 (77.5)	24.7 (76.5)	18.2 (64.8)	10.5 (50.9)	3.3 (37.9)	−1.2 (29.8)	10.9 (51.6)
Daily mean °C (°F)	−6.2 (20.8)	−5.7 (21.7)	−0.8 (30.6)	8.2 (46.8)	14.8 (58.6)	18.4 (65.1)	21 (70)	20.1 (68.2)	14 (57)	7.3 (45.1)	1.1 (34.0)	−3.2 (26.2)	7.4 (45.3)
Mean daily minimum °C (°F)	−8.7 (16.3)	−8.8 (16.2)	−4.9 (23.2)	2.7 (36.9)	9.1 (48.4)	13.1 (55.6)	15.9 (60.6)	14.9 (58.8)	9.8 (49.6)	3.9 (39.0)	−1.2 (29.8)	−5.4 (22.3)	3.4 (38.1)
Average precipitation mm (inches)	51 (2.0)	45 (1.8)	47 (1.9)	50 (2.0)	62 (2.4)	71 (2.8)	73 (2.9)	55 (2.2)	59 (2.3)	59 (2.3)	47 (1.9)	49 (1.9)	668 (26.4)
Source: https://en.climate-data.org/asia/russian-federation/kursk-oblast/ворошнево-664170/

== Transport ==
Voroshnevo is located on the federal route M-2 Crimea Highway (a part of the European route E105), on the road of regional importance 38K-017 (Kursk – Lgov – Rylsk – border with Ukraine), at the railway halt and passing loop 454 km (railway line Lgov I — Kursk).

The rural locality is situated 20 km from Kursk Vostochny Airport, 116 km from Belgorod International Airport and 220 km from Voronezh Peter the Great Airport.
