= Dolgoye, Kursky District, Kursk Oblast =

Rural locality in Kursk Oblast, Russia

Dolgoye Долгое
- Village
- Interactive map of Dolgoye
- Location of Dolgoye Dolgoye (Kursk Oblast)
- Coordinates: 51°43′15″N 36°21′14″E
- Country: Russia
- Federal subject: Kursk Oblast
- Administrative district: Kursky District
- SelsovietSelsoviet: Klyukvinsky

Population (2010 Census)
  - Total: 437
  - Estimate (2010): 437 (0%)

Administrative status
  - Capital of: Klyukvinsky Selsoviet

Municipal status
  - Municipal district: Kursky Municipal District
  - Rural settlement: Klyukvinsky Selsoviet Rural Settlement
  - Capital of: Klyukvinsky Selsoviet Rural Settlement
- Time zone: UTC+3 (MSK)
- Postal code: 305502
- Dialing code: +7 4712
- OKTMO ID: 38620428101
- Website: klukva.rkursk.ru

Dolgoye (Russian: Долгое) is a rural locality (Russian: деревня, lit. 'village') and the administrative center of Klyukvinsky Selsoviet Rural Settlement, Kursky District, Kursk Oblast, Russia. Population: 437 (2010 census); 394 (2002 census);

== Geography ==
The village is located in the Seym River basin (a left tributary of the Desna), 100 km from the Russia–Ukraine border, 7 km east of the district center – the town Kursk.

Streets

There are the following streets in the locality: Beryozovaya, Lazurnaya, Lipovaya, Lugovaya, Mirnaya, Novaya, Raduzhnaya, Sadovaya, Svetlaya, Solnechnaya and Tikhaya (225 houses).

Climate

Dolgoye has a warm-summer humid continental climate (Dfb in the Köppen climate classification).

Climate data for Dolgoye
Month	Jan	Feb	Mar	Apr	May	Jun	Jul	Aug	Sep	Oct	Nov	Dec	Year
Mean daily maximum °C (°F)	−4.2 (24.4)	−3.3 (26.1)	2.6 (36.7)	13 (55)	19.4 (66.9)	22.7 (72.9)	25.4 (77.7)	24.7 (76.5)	18.2 (64.8)	10.5 (50.9)	3.2 (37.8)	−1.3 (29.7)	10.9 (51.6)
Daily mean °C (°F)	−6.3 (20.7)	−5.9 (21.4)	−1 (30)	8.1 (46.6)	14.7 (58.5)	18.3 (64.9)	21 (70)	20 (68)	14 (57)	7.2 (45.0)	1 (34)	−3.2 (26.2)	7.3 (45.2)
Mean daily minimum °C (°F)	−8.9 (16.0)	−9 (16)	−5.2 (22.6)	2.6 (36.7)	8.9 (48.0)	12.9 (55.2)	15.8 (60.4)	14.8 (58.6)	9.6 (49.3)	3.9 (39.0)	−1.3 (29.7)	−5.4 (22.3)	3.2 (37.8)
Average precipitation mm (inches)	51 (2.0)	44 (1.7)	47 (1.9)	50 (2.0)	60 (2.4)	68 (2.7)	70 (2.8)	55 (2.2)	59 (2.3)	59 (2.3)	46 (1.8)	48 (1.9)	657 (26)
Source: https://en.climate-data.org/asia/russian-federation/kursk-oblast/долгое-665125/

== Transport ==
Dolgoye is located on the federal route P-298 (Kursk – Voronezh – P-22 "Kaspy" Highway; a part of the European route E38), on the road of intermunicipal significance 38H-541 (Postoyalye Dvory – Dolgoye), 5 km from the nearest railway station Klyukva (railway line Klyukva — Belgorod).

The rural locality is situated 6 km from Kursk Vostochny Airport, 119 km from Belgorod International Airport and 200 km from Voronezh Peter the Great Airport.
