= Lebyazhye, Kursk Oblast =

Rural locality in Kursk Oblast, Russia

Lebyazhye Лебяжье
- Selo
- Interactive map of Lebyazhye
- Location of Lebyazhye Lebyazhye (Kursk Oblast)
- Coordinates: 51°40′30″N 36°16′23″E
- Country: Russia
- Federal subject: Kursk Oblast
- Administrative district: Kursky District
- SelsovietSelsoviet: Lebyazhensky

Population (2010 Census)
  - Total: 356
  - Estimate (2010): 356 (0%)

Municipal status
  - Municipal district: Kursky Municipal District
  - Rural settlement: Lebyazhensky Selsoviet Rural Settlement
- Time zone: UTC+3 (MSK)
- Postal code: 305526
- Dialing code: +7 4712
- OKTMO ID: 38620432136
- Website: lebajye.rkursk.ru

Lebyazhye (Russian: Лебяжье) is a rural locality (Russian: село, lit. 'village') in Lebyazhensky Selsoviet Rural Settlement, Kursky District, Kursk Oblast, Russia. Population: 356 (2010 census); 365 (2002 census);

== Geography ==
The village is located on the Seym River (a left tributary of the Desna), 92 km from the Russia–Ukraine border, 5 km south-east of Kursk, 8 km from the selsoviet center – Cheryomushki.

Streets

There are the following streets in the locality: Shkolnaya and Zemlyanichnaya (252 houses).

Climate

Lebyazhye has a warm-summer humid continental climate (Dfb in the Köppen climate classification).

== Transport ==
Lebyazhye is located on the European route E38 (Ukraine – Russia (Rylsk, Kursk, Voronezh, Borisoglebsk, Saratov, Yershov) – Kazakhstan), on the road of regional importance 38K-019 (Kursk – Bolshoye Shumakovo – Polevaya via Lebyazhye), 2.5 km from the nearest railway station Klyukva (railway line Klyukva — Belgorod).

The rural locality is situated 8.5 km from Kursk Vostochny Airport, 115 km from Belgorod International Airport and 205 km from Voronezh Peter the Great Airport.
