= Bolshoye Shumakovo, Kursk Oblast =

Rural locality in Kursk Oblast, Russia

Bolshoye Shumakovo Большое Шумаково
- Village
- Location of Bolshoye Shumakovo
- Location of Bolshoye Shumakovo Bolshoye Shumakovo (Kursk Oblast)
- Coordinates: 51°38′43″N 36°22′54″E
- Country: Russia
- Federal subject: Kursk Oblast
- Administrative district: Kursky District
- Selsoviet: Shumakovsky

Population (2010 Census)
  - Total: 785

Administrative status
  - Capital of: Shumakovsky Selsoviet

Municipal status
  - Municipal district: Kursky Municipal District
  - Rural settlement: Shumakovsky Selsoviet Rural Settlement
  - Capital of: Shumakovsky Selsoviet Rural Settlement
- Time zone: UTC+3 (MSK)
- Postal code(s): 305541
- Dialing code(s): +7 4712
- OKTMO ID: 38620488101
- Website: shumakovo.rkursk.ru

Bolshoye Shumakovo (Russian: Большое Шумаково) is a rural locality (Russian: деревня, lit. 'village') and the administrative center of Shumakovsky Selsoviet Rural Settlement, Kursky District, Kursk Oblast, Russia. Population: 785 (2010 Census); 816 (2002 Census);

== Geography ==
The village is located on the Mlodat River (a left tributary of the Seym), 95 km from the Russia–Ukraine border, 14 km south-east of the district center – the town Kursk.

Climate

Bolshoye Shumakovo has a warm-summer humid continental climate (Dfb in the Köppen climate classification).

Climate data for Bolshoye Shumakovo
Month	Jan	Feb	Mar	Apr	May	Jun	Jul	Aug	Sep	Oct	Nov	Dec	Year
Mean daily maximum °C (°F)	−4.1 (24.6)	−3.2 (26.2)	2.8 (37.0)	13.1 (55.6)	19.5 (67.1)	22.8 (73.0)	25.4 (77.7)	24.8 (76.6)	18.3 (64.9)	10.6 (51.1)	3.3 (37.9)	−1.2 (29.8)	11.0 (51.8)
Daily mean °C (°F)	−6.2 (20.8)	−5.7 (21.7)	−0.8 (30.6)	8.2 (46.8)	14.8 (58.6)	18.4 (65.1)	21 (70)	20.1 (68.2)	14.1 (57.4)	7.3 (45.1)	1.1 (34.0)	−3.2 (26.2)	7.4 (45.4)
Mean daily minimum °C (°F)	−8.8 (16.2)	−8.9 (16.0)	−5 (23)	2.7 (36.9)	9.1 (48.4)	13 (55)	15.9 (60.6)	14.9 (58.8)	9.7 (49.5)	3.9 (39.0)	−1.3 (29.7)	−5.4 (22.3)	3.3 (38.0)
Average precipitation mm (inches)	51 (2.0)	44 (1.7)	46 (1.8)	50 (2.0)	60 (2.4)	69 (2.7)	72 (2.8)	55 (2.2)	60 (2.4)	59 (2.3)	46 (1.8)	49 (1.9)	661 (26)
Source: https://en.climate-data.org/asia/russian-federation/kursk-oblast/большое-шумаково-665127/

== Transport ==
Bolshoye Shumakovo is located on the road of regional importance 38K-019 (Kursk – Bolshoye Shumakovo – Polevaya via Lebyazhye), in the vicinity of the railway halt Zaplava (railway line Klyukva — Belgorod).

The rural locality is situated 14 km from Kursk Vostochny Airport, 111 km from Belgorod International Airport and 197 km from Voronezh Peter the Great Airport.
