= Cheryomushki, Kursk Oblast =

Rural locality in Kursk Oblast, Russia

Cheryomushki Черёмушки
- Settlement
- Interactive map of Cheryomushki
- Location of Cheryomushki Cheryomushki (Kursk Oblast)
- Coordinates: 51°36′10″N 36°15′22″E
- Country: Russia
- Federal subject: Kursk Oblast
- Administrative district: Kursky District
- SelsovietSelsoviet: Lebyazhensky

Population (2010 Census)
  - Total: 1,050
  - Estimate (2010): 1,050 (0%)

Administrative status
  - Capital of: Lebyazhensky Selsoviet

Municipal status
  - Municipal district: Kursky Municipal District
  - Rural settlement: Lebyazhensky Selsoviet Rural Settlement
  - Capital of: Lebyazhensky Selsoviet Rural Settlement
- Time zone: UTC+3 (MSK)
- Postal code: 305526
- Dialing code: +7 4712
- OKTMO ID: 38620432101
- Website: lebajye.rkursk.ru

Cheryomushki (Russian: Черёмушки) is a rural locality (a settlement) and the administrative center of Lebyazhensky Selsoviet Rural Settlement, Kursky District, Kursk Oblast, Russia. Population: 1,050 (2010 census); 1,067 (2002 census);

== Geography ==
The settlement is located 86 km from the Russia–Ukraine border, 10 km south-east of Kursk.

Streets

There are the following streets in the locality: Beregovaya, Polevaya and Stepnaya (187 houses).

Climate

Cheryomushki has a warm-summer humid continental climate (Dfb in the Köppen climate classification).

Climate data for Cheryomushki
Month	Jan	Feb	Mar	Apr	May	Jun	Jul	Aug	Sep	Oct	Nov	Dec	Year
Mean daily maximum °C (°F)	−4.1 (24.6)	−3.1 (26.4)	2.8 (37.0)	13 (55)	19.4 (66.9)	22.7 (72.9)	25.4 (77.7)	24.7 (76.5)	18.2 (64.8)	10.6 (51.1)	3.4 (38.1)	−1.2 (29.8)	11.0 (51.7)
Daily mean °C (°F)	−6.2 (20.8)	−5.7 (21.7)	−0.8 (30.6)	8.2 (46.8)	14.7 (58.5)	18.3 (64.9)	21 (70)	20.1 (68.2)	14 (57)	7.3 (45.1)	1.1 (34.0)	−3.1 (26.4)	7.4 (45.3)
Mean daily minimum °C (°F)	−8.7 (16.3)	−8.8 (16.2)	−4.9 (23.2)	2.6 (36.7)	9 (48)	12.9 (55.2)	15.8 (60.4)	14.9 (58.8)	9.7 (49.5)	3.9 (39.0)	−1.2 (29.8)	−5.3 (22.5)	3.3 (38.0)
Average precipitation mm (inches)	50 (2.0)	43 (1.7)	46 (1.8)	48 (1.9)	60 (2.4)	68 (2.7)	70 (2.8)	54 (2.1)	57 (2.2)	57 (2.2)	45 (1.8)	48 (1.9)	646 (25.5)

== Transport ==
Cheryomushki is located 7 km from the road of regional importance 38K-019 (Kursk – Bolshoye Shumakovo – Polevaya via Lebyazhye), on the roads of intermunicipal significance 38H-416 (Kursk – Petrin) and 38H-418 (38H-416 – 38K-019), 8.5 km from the nearest railway halt 465 km (railway line Lgov I — Kursk).

The rural locality is situated 17 km from Kursk Vostochny Airport, 107 km from Belgorod International Airport and 207 km from Voronezh Peter the Great Airport.
