= Polevaya, Kursk Oblast =

Rural locality in Kursk Oblast, Russia

Polevaya Полевая
- Village
- Interactive map of Polevaya
- Location of Polevaya Polevaya (Kursk Oblast)
- Coordinates: 51°36′40″N 36°30′02″E
- Country: Russia
- Federal subject: Kursk Oblast
- Administrative district: Kursky District
- SelsovietSelsoviet: Polevskoy

Population (2010 Census)
  - Total: 1,575
  - Estimate (2010): 1,575 (0%)

Administrative status
  - Capital of: Polevskoy Selsoviet

Municipal status
  - Municipal district: Kursky Municipal District
  - Rural settlement: Polevskoy Selsoviet Rural Settlement
  - Capital of: Polevskoy Selsoviet Rural Settlement
- Time zone: UTC+3 (MSK)
- Postal code: 305540
- Dialing code: +7 4712
- OKTMO ID: 38620468101
- Website: polevaya.rkursk.ru

Polevaya (Russian: Полевая) is a rural locality (Russian: деревня, lit. 'village') and the administrative center of Polevskoy Selsoviet Rural Settlement, Kursky District, Kursk Oblast, Russia. Population: 1,575 (2010 census); 1,656 (2002 census);

== Geography ==
The village is located on the Seym River (a left tributary of the Desna), 98 km from the Russia–Ukraine border, 22 km south-east of the district center – the town Kursk.

Streets

There are the following streets in the locality: Naberezhnaya, Pristantsionnaya, Pushnaya, Sadovaya, Urochishche Gorki, Urochishche Limany, Shkolnaya and Energetikov (644 houses).

Climate

Polevaya has a warm-summer humid continental climate (Dfb in the Köppen climate classification).

Climate data for Polevaya
Month	Jan	Feb	Mar	Apr	May	Jun	Jul	Aug	Sep	Oct	Nov	Dec	Year
Mean daily maximum °C (°F)	−4.2 (24.4)	−3.2 (26.2)	2.8 (37.0)	13.1 (55.6)	19.5 (67.1)	22.8 (73.0)	25.5 (77.9)	24.9 (76.8)	18.3 (64.9)	10.6 (51.1)	3.3 (37.9)	−1.2 (29.8)	11.0 (51.8)
Daily mean °C (°F)	−6.2 (20.8)	−5.8 (21.6)	−0.8 (30.6)	8.3 (46.9)	14.8 (58.6)	18.5 (65.3)	21.1 (70.0)	20.2 (68.4)	14.1 (57.4)	7.3 (45.1)	1.1 (34.0)	−3.2 (26.2)	7.5 (45.4)
Mean daily minimum °C (°F)	−8.8 (16.2)	−8.9 (16.0)	−5 (23)	2.7 (36.9)	9.1 (48.4)	13.1 (55.6)	15.9 (60.6)	15 (59)	9.7 (49.5)	3.9 (39.0)	−1.3 (29.7)	−5.4 (22.3)	3.3 (38.0)
Average precipitation mm (inches)	50 (2.0)	43 (1.7)	46 (1.8)	48 (1.9)	60 (2.4)	68 (2.7)	71 (2.8)	52 (2.0)	57 (2.2)	57 (2.2)	45 (1.8)	49 (1.9)	646 (25.4)
Source: https://en.climate-data.org/asia/russian-federation/kursk-oblast/полевая-319132/

== Transport ==
Polevaya is located 9.5 km from the federal route P-298 (Kursk – Voronezh – P-22 "Kaspy" Highway; a part of the European route E38), on the roads of regional importance 38K-019 (Kursk – Bolshoye Shumakovo – Polevaya via Lebyazhye) and 38K-014 (R-298 – Polevaya), there is railway station Polevaya (railway line Klyukva — Belgorod).

The rural locality is situated 22 km from Kursk Vostochny Airport, 106 km from Belgorod International Airport and 190 km from Voronezh Peter the Great Airport.
