= R22 highway (Russia) =

Road in Russia

Federal Highway R22
- Федеральная автомобильная дорога Р22
- Caspian Highway
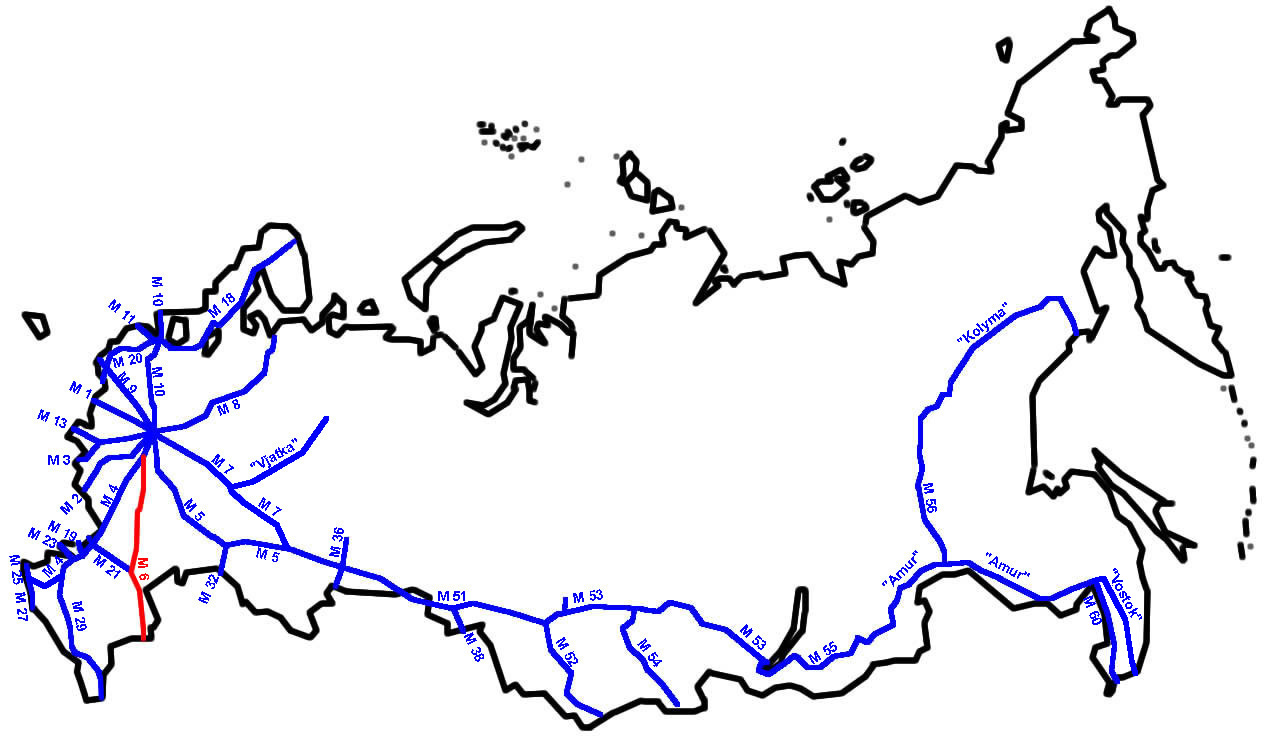

Route information
- Part of E38 / E40 / E119

- Part of AH8 AH61 AH70
- Length: 1,381 km (858 mi)
- Existed: 1957–present
- History: Was M6 from 1957-2018

Major junctions
- North end: M 4 south of Stupino
- South end: R216 in Astrakhan

Location
- Country: Russia

Highway system
- Russian Federal Highways

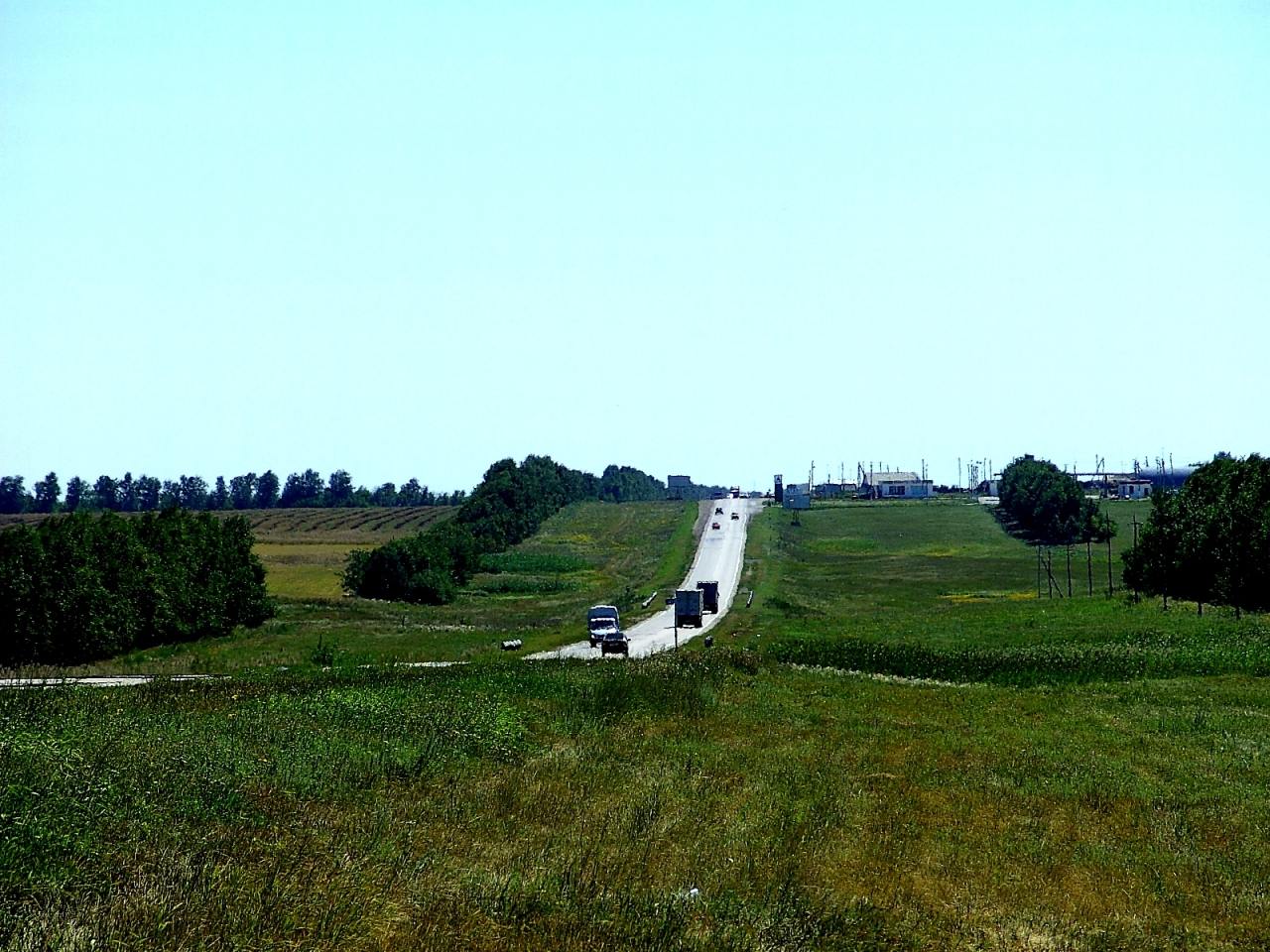
The road in Volgograd Oblast

The Russian route R22 (also known as the Caspian Highway) is a major trunk road that links Moscow to the Caspian Sea. The road runs from Stupino, then heads southeast across Ryazan Oblast, Tambov Oblast, Voronezh Oblast, and Volgograd Oblast, running along the right bank of the Volga River through Volgograd before terminating at Astrakhan. Its length is 1381 kilometers. The entire route is part of European route E119, the stretch between Volgograd and Astrakhan is also part of European route E40, and the stretch between Borisoglebsk and Saratov is also a part of European route E38. The section from Kashira to Astrakhan is part of AH8, the section from Saratov to Borisoglebsk is part of AH61, and the section from Volgograd to Astrakhan is part of AH70. In 2018, the northern terminus was moved to the M4 south of Stupino, removing the concurrency with the M4. Before 2018 the route was designated as M6.

== Route ==
Moscow Oblast
0 km – Kashira
Ryazan Oblast
100 km – Mikhaylov
192 km – Ryazhsk
Tambov Oblast
242 km – Pervomayskoye
286 km – Michurinsk
337 km – Tambov
377 km – Znamenka
Voronezh Oblast
499 km – Borisoglebsk
519 km – Povorino
Volgograd Oblast
609 km – Novoanninsky
673 km – Mikhaylovka
728 km – Frolovo
756 km – Log
778 km – Ilovlya
861 km – Volgograd
Astrakhan Oblast
945 km – Solodniki
972 km – Vyazovka
1022 km – Chyorny Yar
1062 km – Nikolskoye
Kalmykia
1095 km – Tsagan-Aman
Astrakhan Oblast
1138 km – Yenotayevka
1208 km – Zamyany
1286 km – Astrakhan
