= European route E38 =

Road in trans-European E-road network

E38

Route information
- Length: 3,400 km (2,100 mi)

Major junctions
- West end: Hlukhiv, Ukraine
- East end: Shymkent, Kazakhstan

Location
- Countries: Ukraine, Russia, Kazakhstan

Highway system
- International E-road network; A Class; B Class

European route E38 (E38) is a road part of the International E-road network. It runs between Hlukhiv, Ukraine and Shymkent, Kazakhstan. It is 3,400 km (2,100 mi) long.

The E38 is the only signposted European route in Kazakhstan. While the country has a few E-routes other than the E38, none of those were signposted.

Asian Highway 61 (AH61) runs along the same roads but continues to Kyrgyzstan and crossing into China.

== Route ==
Ukraine

- P 65: Hlukhiv (E105)

Russia

- 38K-017: Rylsk - Lgov - Kurchatov
- 38K-010: Kurchatov - Kursk (E105)
- M 2: within Kursk
- R 298: Kursk - Voronezh (E115) - Borisoglebsk (E119)
- R 22: Borisoglebsk - Saratov
- A 298: Saratov - Yershov - Ozinki

Kazakhstan

- R 236: Oral (E121)
- M 32: Oral - Kyzylorda (E123 / E004) - Shymkent (E40)
