= Kursky District, Kursk Oblast =

Kursky District Курский район (Russian)
- District
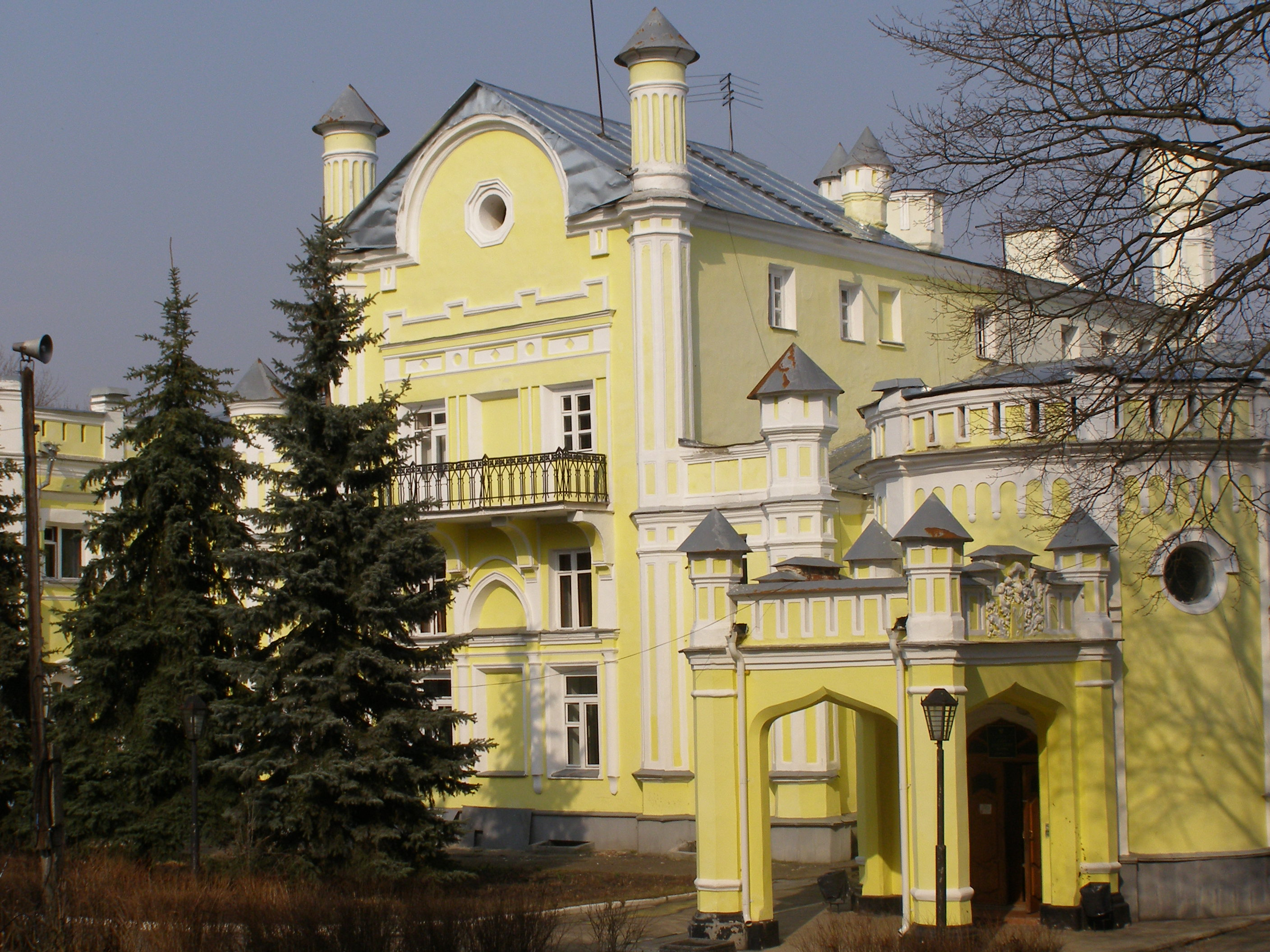
- Western facade of the palace in Mokwa, Kursky District

- Coat of arms
- Location of Kursky District in Kursk Oblast
- Coordinates: 51°44′N 36°11′E
- Country: Russia
- Federal subject: Kursk Oblast
- Administrative center: Kursk

Area
  - Total: 1,620 km^{2} (630 sq mi)

Population (2010 Census)
  - Total: 54,778
  - Density: 33.8/km^{2} (87.6/sq mi)
  - Urban: 0%
  - Rural: 100%

Administrative structure
  - Administrative divisions: 21 Selsoviets
  - Inhabited localities: 192 rural localities

Municipal structure
  - Municipally incorporated as: Kursky Municipal District
  - Municipal divisions: 0 urban settlements, 17 rural settlements
- Time zone: UTC+3 (MSK)
- OKTMO ID: 38620000
- Website: http://kurskr.rkursk.ru/

Kursky District (Russian: Ку́рский райо́н) is an administrative and municipal district (raion), one of the twenty-eight in Kursk Oblast, Russia. It is located in the center of the oblast. The area of the district is 1,657.29 square kilometers (639.88 sq mi). Its administrative center is the city of Kursk (which is not administratively a part of the district). Population: 54,521 (2021 census); 54,778 (2010 census); 56,494 (2002 Census); 56,701 (1989 Soviet census).

== Geography ==
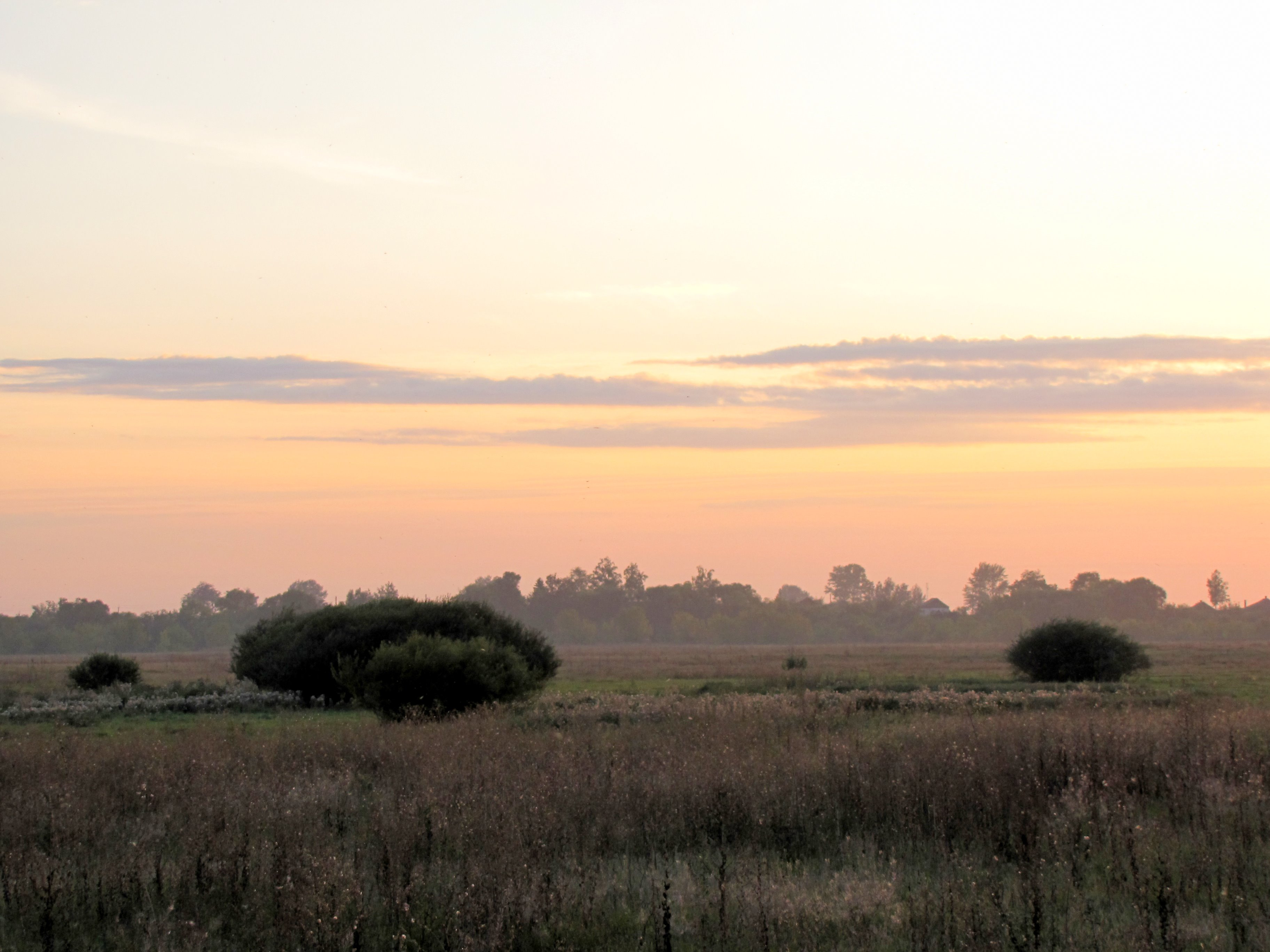
Seym valley, Kursky District

Kursky District is located in the center of Kursk Oblast. The terrain is hilly plain; the district lies on the Orel-Kursk plateau of the Central Russian Upland. The main river in the district is the Seym River, which flows east to west through the district, joining the Desna River and eventually the Dnieper River in Ukraine. The district surrounds the city of Kursk, which is the administrative center of Kursky District, but not part of it. The district is 430 km southwest of Moscow. The area measures 40 km (north-south), and 50 km (west-east).

The district is bordered on the north by Zolotukhinsky District, on the east by Shchigrovsky District, on the south by Medvensky District, and on the west by Oktyabrsky District.

== Administrative and municipal status ==
Within the framework of administrative divisions, Kursky District is one of the twenty-eight in the oblast. The city of Kursk serves as its administrative center, despite being incorporated separately as a city of oblast significance—an administrative unit with the status equal to that of the districts.

As a municipal division, the district is incorporated as Kursky Municipal District. The city of oblast significance of Kursk is incorporated separately from the district as Kursk Urban Okrug.

== Administrative division of the district ==
The district is divided into 17 administrative units (selsoviets):

Sielsoviet	The seat of the unit	Number of localities	Population (2010)	Area [km^{2}]	Website
Besedinsky	Besedino	23	3131	192.02	besedino.rkursk.ru
Brezhnevsky	Verkhnekasinovo	27	1385	159.67	brejnevskiy.rkursk.ru
Kamyshinsky	Kamyshi	7	3245	72.28	kamish.rkursk.ru
Klyukvinsky	Dolgoye	9	10 603	117.60	klukva.rkursk.ru
Lebyazhensky	Cheryomushki	20	3473	138.43	lebajye.rkursk.ru
Mokovsky	1st Mokva	7	3520	45.72	mokva.rkursk.ru
Nizhnemedveditsky	Verkhnyaya Medveditsa	16	3317	115.78	nmedvedica.rkursk.ru
Novoposelenovsky	1st Tsvetovo	8	3509	73.14	novoposel.rkursk.ru
Nozdrachevsky	Nozdrachevo	4	837	79.81	nozdrachevo.rkursk.ru
Pashkovsky	Chaplygina	13	2057	71.47	pashkovskiy.rkursk.ru
Polevskoy	Polevaya	15	4003	210.47	polevaya.rkursk.ru
Polyansky	Polyanskoye	13	2084	121.72	polanskoe.rkursk.ru
Ryshkovsky	Ryshkovo	4	3171	53.69	rishkovo.rkursk.ru
Shchetinsky	Shchetinka	10	5869	45.31	shetin.rkursk.ru
Shumakovsky	Bolshoye Shumakovo	3	1548	61.61	shumakovo.rkursk.ru
Vinnikovsky	1st Vinnikovo	9	1234	71.44	vinnikovo.rkursk.ru
Voroshnevsky	Voroshnevo	3	4706	26.84	voroshnevo.rkursk.ru

There are 191 rural localities within the district, including 4 unpopulated ones:

Locality	Original name	Sielsoviet	Population (2002)	Coordinates
Nikolayevka	Николаевка	Brezhnevsky	4	51°54′06″N 35°54′14″E
Stepnoy	Степной	Lebyazhensky	5	51°34′42″N 36°22′54″E
Tyoply	Тёплый	Brezhnevsky	9	51°53′50″N 35°57′03″E
Voskresenovka	Воскресеновка	Brezhnevsky	4	51°55′08″N 35°54′33″E
