= Frolovka =

Frolovka (Russian: Фроловка) is the name of several rural localities in Russia:

- Frolovka, Amur Oblast, a selo in Frolovsky Rural Settlement of Seryshevsky District of Amur Oblast
- Frolovka, Karachevsky District, Bryansk Oblast, a village in Mylinsky Selsoviet of Karachevsky District of Bryansk Oblast
- Frolovka, Rognedinsky District, Bryansk Oblast, a village in Osoviksky Selsoviet of Rognedinsky District of Bryansk Oblast
- Frolovka, Chelyabinsk Oblast, a village in Berezovsky Selsoviet of Krasnoarmeysky District of Chelyabinsk Oblast
- Frolovka, Ivanovo Oblast, a village in Privolzhsky District of Ivanovo Oblast
- Frolovka, Khvastovichsky District, Kaluga Oblast, a selo in Khvastovichsky District, Kaluga Oblast
- Frolovka, Kuybyshevsky District, Kaluga Oblast, a village in Kuybyshevsky District, Kaluga Oblast
- Frolovka, Kostroma Oblast, a village in Sudislavskoye Settlement of Sudislavsky District of Kostroma Oblast
- Frolovka, Kurgan Oblast, a selo in Frolovsky Selsoviet of Tselinny District of Kurgan Oblast
- Frolovka, Kursk Oblast, a khutor in Brezhnevsky Selsoviet of Kursky District of Kursk Oblast
- Frolovka, Mtsensky District, Oryol Oblast, a village in Karandakovsky Selsoviet of Mtsensky District of Oryol Oblast
- Frolovka, Novoderevenkovsky District, Oryol Oblast, a village in Nikitinsky Selsoviet of Novoderevenkovsky District of Oryol Oblast
- Frolovka, Sverdlovsky District, Oryol Oblast, a village in Bogodukhovsky Selsoviet of Sverdlovsky District of Oryol Oblast
- Frolovka, Trosnyansky District, Oryol Oblast, a village in Pennovsky Selsoviet of Trosnyansky District of Oryol Oblast
- Frolovka, Primorsky Krai, a selo in Partizansky District of Primorsky Krai
- Frolovka, Rostov Oblast, a khutor in Titovskoye Rural Settlement of Millerovsky District of Rostov Oblast
- Frolovka, Tambov Oblast, a village in Glazkovsky Selsoviet of Michurinsky District of Tambov Oblast
- Frolovka, Kamensky District, Tula Oblast, a village in Kadnovsky Rural Okrug of Kamensky District of Tula Oblast
- Frolovka, Leninsky District, Tula Oblast, a village in Prilepsky Rural Okrug of Leninsky District of Tula Oblast
