= 217th Rifle Division =

- Active: 1941–1946
- Country: Soviet Union
- Branch: Red Army
- Type: Infantry
- Size: Division
- Engagements: Operation Barbarossa; Battle of Smolensk (1941); Operation Typhoon; Battle of Moscow; Kaluga Offensive operation Battles of Rzhev; Operation Kutuzov; Battle of Smolensk (1943); Gomel-Rechitsa Offensive operation Parichi-Bobruisk Offensive operation Operation Bagration; Bobruysk offensive Minsk offensive Vistula-Oder offensive East Prussian offensive Heiligenbeil Pocket
- Decorations: Order of Lenin; Order of the Red Banner; Order of Suvorov
- Battle honours: Unecha

Commanders
- Notable commanders: Col. Mikhail Alekseevich Grachyov; Col. Vladimir Petrovich Shlegel; Maj. Gen. Kuzma Petrovich Trubnikov; Col. Pyotr Fyodorovich Malyshev; Maj. Gen. Efim Vasilevich Ryzhikov; Col. Nikolai Pavlovich Massonov; Col. Grigorii Arkadevich Grigoryan

The 217th Rifle Division was an infantry division of the Red Army, originally formed in the months just before the start of the German invasion, based on the shtat (table of organization and equipment) of September 13, 1939. It was formed at Voronezh and was considered a "sister" to the 222nd Rifle Division. When Operation Barbarossa began it was in 28th Army but soon after moving to the front it helped form the 43rd Army before being reassigned to 50th Army in Bryansk Front. After barely escaping disbandment during Operation Typhoon it took part in the defense of Tula; in the following counteroffensive one of its rifle regiments was so reduced by casualties that it had to be replaced by a Tula militia regiment. During the rest of 1942 and into 1943 it served in a largely defensive role as part of 49th Army and 16th Army although it took part in one abortive offensive in March 1943 north of Zhizdra. It remained in the latter Army when it was redesignated 11th Guards and fought under its command in the July-August offensive against the German-held Oryol salient before being transferred to 11th Army and winning an honorific in the advance through western Russia. In recognition of its role in the battle for Gomel it was awarded the Order of the Red Banner. After winter battles in eastern Belarus the 217th played leading roles in the liberation of Zhlobin and Bobruisk in the early stages of Operation Bagration as part of 48th Army. During the Vistula-Oder offensive it took part in the liberation of Mława and then crossed into the western part of East Prussia, winning the rare distinction of the Order of Lenin in the process. It ended the war in East Prussia and remained in the Königsberg area until the spring of 1946 when it was converted to the 3rd Rifle Brigade.

== Formation ==
The division began forming on March 14, 1941, at Voronezh in the Oryol Military District. When completed it had the following order of battle:

- 740th Rifle Regiment
- 755th Rifle Regiment
- 766th Rifle Regiment
- 668th Artillery Regiment
- 726th Howitzer Artillery Regiment (until September 10, 1941)
- 31st Antitank Battalion
- 279th Reconnaissance Company
- 396th Sapper Battalion
- 589th Signal Battalion (later 422nd Signal Company)
- 389th Medical/Sanitation Battalion
- 314th Chemical Defense (Anti-gas) Company
- 256th Motor Transport Company (later 686th Motor Transport Battalion)
- 261st Field Bakery (later 331st Motorized Field Bakery)
- 155th Divisional Veterinary Hospital
- 312th Field Postal Station
- 571st Field Office of the State Bank

Col. Mikhail Alekseevich Grachyov was appointed to command on the day the division began forming; Col. Vladimir Petrovich Shlegel became his chief of staff in June. It was still completing its formation when the German invasion began but unlike the divisions on the frontier it had 10-14 days to receive reinforcements and reservists according to the mobilization plan before it went into battle. At this time it was in the 30th Rifle Corps of the separate 28th Army in the Reserve of the Supreme High Command. By July 10 it had been transferred to 33rd Rifle Corps in the same Army. At this time the 217th was en route to Selizharovo under these commands.

=== Battle of Smolensk ===
Beginning on July 30 the Reserve Front was authorized and the 43rd Army was soon created on the basis of 33rd Rifle Corps. This Army was attempting to establish a defense along a previously fortified line from Zhukovka to Stolby (50km northwest and west of Bryansk). Within days the 28th Army, under command of Lt. Gen. V. Ya. Kachalov, found itself in an untenable position with its entire defensive front along the Desna River threatened with encirclement. Under orders from the commander of Reserve Front, Army Gen. G. K. Zhukov, Kachalov was ordered to withdraw with two of his divisions, but was killed 16km north of Roslavl with several other members of his headquarters about midday on August 4. The remnants of Kachalov's group came under command of 43rd Army and the next day Zhukov sent orders to its commander, Lt. Gen. I. G. Zakharkin, that read in part:

Immediately send 217th Rifle Division's reconnaissance to the Pustosel, Sviridovka, Asele, Dolgoe, and Novyi Krupets line and tie them in with 258th RD's forces along the Zhukovka and Belogolovki line.

Due to false reporting Stalin came to believe that Kachalov had deserted to the Germans and his name was not finally cleared until 1953.

During the second week of August the 2nd Panzer Group began driving south across the Sozh River creating a threat to Bryansk. In response the STAVKA ordered the creation of Bryansk Front on August 14 consisting of just two armies, the 13th and the new 50th Army, which immediately had the 217th assigned. This Army had eight rifle divisions under command but the 217th was the only one formed before the start of the German invasion. The 50th was under command of Maj. Gen. M. P. Petrov. The 217th, along with the 279th Rifle Division, was to continue to hold its current positions while reconnoitering to the Baranovka–Ratovskaya–Kokhanovo line. From August 18 50th Army was shoring up its defenses on the Front's right wing around and north of Bryansk and by the end of the 21st was holding relatively sound defensive positions along and west of the Desna. On August 18 Colonel Grachyov left his command and was replaced by Colonel Shlegel.

At 2300 hours on August 24 Petrov issued orders to his Army, which was stretched along a 100km-wide front and facing two panzer divisions and a motorized division:

217th RD (with 207th [Howitzer Artillery Regiment]) - defend the line along the eastern bank of the Snopot River and Desna River in the sector from Bolshaya Lutna to 1st of May State Farm, withdraw 766th [Rifle Regiment] into reserve behind the right wing after its relief by 43rd Army's units, conduct an active reconnaissance, and protect the boundary with 43rd Army. Headquarters - Kosevat village.

The division was also directed to protect its boundary with the 279th Rifle Division. In a conversation with the STAVKA on the same date the Front commander, Lt. Gen. A. I. Yeryomenko, was warned that this panzer grouping was aimed at these two divisions. However, by this time the priority for 2nd Panzer Group was preparing for the drive southward to encircle Southwestern Front east of Kiev. As this offensive developed on August 26 Yeryomenko was directed to launch diversionary attacks, including on the sector of the 217th. At the same time the 10th Motorized Division had been directed to seize crossings of the Desna in order to protect the flank of 2nd Panzer Group and to intercept Soviet forces attempting to escape encirclement. It captured the town of Korop and established a small bridgehead late on August 28, which forced the 217th back to the defense. The division was reported as "successfully defending the Buda and Kholopenkovy front... except in the Lozitsy, Krasnyi Shchipal, Pavlova Sloboda and Molotkovo sector, where an enemy force of up to two [infantry regiments] and 130 tanks penetrated the forward security positions at 1000 hours but were contained short of the main defensive belt."

By the end of the next day the lead battlegroup of 10th Motorized (which in fact had only 12 tanks on strength) pushed southward 20km. The 217th was reported as holding its previous positions "while repelling and destroying enemy units attacking in the Snopot and Piatnitskoe region" with artillery, mortar and machine gun fire; this situation was essentially unchanged 48 hours later. The STAVKA issued orders at 0615 hours on August 30 for Bryansk Front to go over to the attack with most of its forces toward Roslavl and Starodub. Within 50th Army the 217th and three other divisions were to defend their positions while the remainder began their assault on September 3. In addition to its overextended sector the Front also lacked any substantial armored forces, making the operation entirely unrealistic.

==== Roslavl-Novozybkov Offensive ====
At 1000 hours on September 1 Petrov issued orders to the 217th (still supported by two battalions of what is now identified as the 207th Cannon Artillery Regiment) to defend the line from Frolovka along the Desna to the mouth of the Seshcha River and also "seize and hold the Lipovka and Dubrovka region by day's end on 2 September." This attack began after a two-hour artillery preparation but had inadequate air support and was plagued by poor organization and coordination; in a summary report at 1800 hours the division was stated as "partially regrouping" while occupying its previous positions, indicating that its attack had failed. At the end of the next day its situation remained unchanged facing an "inactive enemy."

Regardless of these efforts the 2nd Panzer Group, and specifically XXIV Motorized Corps, was pushing southward into eastern Ukraine. During September 3 the 740th Rifle Regiment occupied Piatnitskoe with one battalion and a second battalion was 1.5km northwest of Vyazovsk, but the division made no further advances the following day. By the end of September 6 it had identified that it was facing the 258th Infantry Division, which was essentially inactive. By now Yeryomenko was aware that his counteroffensive had failed and that his Front was in peril due to developments both to the north and the south. The 217th continued to hold against the 258th the next day. On September 14 Colonel Grachyov returned to command and Colonel Shlegel resumed his role as chief of staff.

== Operation Typhoon ==
Army Group Center launched the main phase of its final offensive on Moscow on October 2. The 217th was still on the right (north) flank of 50th Army, trying to defend a sector 46km in extent with a force of 11,953 men, armed with 360 machine guns and 144 artillery pieces, including 18 antitank guns. The 4th Panzer Group had chosen to make its attack at the boundary between the division and the 53rd Rifle Division of 43rd Army to its north; this was also the boundary between Bryansk Front and Western Front. The 766th Rifle Regiment, on the division's right flank, could not withstand the concentrated attack and fled in panic. In the first hours its supporting battalion of the 668th Artillery Regiment lost 12 of its guns. A later report by one of the division's commissars stated:

On 2 October 1941 the Germans conducted a heavy artillery preparation, destroyed [our] machine-gun emplacements and went on the attack. German aviation didn't give us the chance to deploy. As a result the division was smashed. The 766th Regiment... has been lost. Only around 20 men remained of the 755th Regiment. The division is leaderless. The Red Army men have been abandoned to the whim of fate.

In fact the situation, while dire, was not as bad as this officer, who had abandoned his post, reported. While the 217th had suffered considerable casualties it continued to engage the German forces. However, during the next day the division's retreat also uncovered the left flank of Western Front's 33rd Army. By the end of the day it had fallen back to a line from Budchino to the Vetma River, where it turned and tried to halt the German units that were attacking toward Lyudinovo. It was now facing the 52nd Infantry Division of XXXXIII Army Corps.

By the end of October 4 General Yeryomenko was aware that his Front was again facing the prospect of encirclement. Petrov reported at 2100 hours that the 217th was retreating to the Olshanitsy–Volynskii crossroads–Hill 197.6 area. In the event the depleted division, together with the 290th Rifle Division and the 643rd Cavalry Regiment, was able to hold the German offensive in check on this line until October 6.

On October 7 the 17th Panzer Division captured Bryansk, in the rear of much of 50th Army, while the 18th Panzer Division was driving northward even deeper in the Army's rear. The 50th was now "cordoned off" if not firmly encircled. The next day General Petrov was able to break contact with most of the German forces and his divisions completed a 50km rapid march to the east on October 9 before running into significant resistance. After heavy fighting over the following days they engaged a strong German grouping approaching from the direction of Oryol on October 12 which blocked their path to the east and southeast. A report by German 4th Army the next day claimed 40,000 prisoners had been taken and that the 50th had been destroyed but in fact it had reached a line from Podbuzhe to Karachev and was preparing a breakout across the Resseta River. General Petrov led a flanking detachment on October 15 that cleared the east bank of the river but was mortally wounded in the fighting. By the end of the next day the leading elements of the retreating force had reached Belyov. Colonel Grachyov was taken prisoner on October 17 and Colonel Shlegel again took over command.

The remnants of seven rifle divisions, a tank brigade, and several other units had emerged from encirclement in the Belyov area by October 23. The 217th had managed to save 14 guns of its 668th Regiment. Altogether 12,000 troops of 50th Army escaped to take up new defenses in the sector. The division continued to hold along the Upa River near Odoyev until October 27, after which it resumed its retreat toward Tula, reaching north of that city by November 2. On November 16 Maj. Gen. Kuzma Petrovich Trubnikov, who had previously commanded the 258th Rifle Division, took over command from Colonel Shlegel. On November 22 Lt. Gen. I. V. Boldin was appointed commander of 50th Army. Bryansk Front had been disbanded on November 10 and Boldin's Army was now on the southern flank of Western Front.

=== Defense of Tula ===
Tula was a major arsenal for the Soviet Union; many of its small arms and heavier weapons, plus ammunition, were produced in its factories. Boldin's predecessor, Maj. Gen. A. N. Yermakov, had created a sub-headquarters in the form of the Tula Combat Sector on October 29. It consisted of the 217th, 173rd, 290th, 260th and 154th Rifle Divisions, plus the 58th Reserve and 1005th Rifle Regiments. At this time the combat strengths of the divisions varied greatly but on average were about 1,000 personnel each. The 217th had 12 artillery pieces (nine 76mm guns and three 152mm howitzers) and eight mortars. It had seven heavy machine guns and only 62.7 percent of its soldiers had rifles, but this was within the average for the Sector.

From October 30 to November 6 German forces attempted to capture Tula by means of a frontal blow from the south. Mixed groups of infantry and tanks began attacking on the morning of October 30 as leading elements of the 217th and 154th were arriving. The Tula Combat Sector had 4,400-4,500 men under command by the end of the day. These held their positions over the next two days, accounting for 22 tanks and an armored car in the fighting. 50th Army was being reinforced by the 32nd Tank Brigade and 413th Rifle Division during this time which allowed it to reestablish communications with 49th Army to its north. By November 5 all German efforts to take the city from the south had been frustrated, in part because their supply lines were vastly overstretched while arms and ammunition were being fed to 50th Army direct from the factories in their immediate rear. The reinforcements went over to the counterattack at dawn on November 7 but this developed slowly due to active German resistance and inexperience on the Soviet side and made no permanent gains. The next day the 217th and 154th beat off multiple attacks toward Kitaevka and in the area of the Oryol road.

Over the following week the German forces focused on again breaking communications between the two Soviet armies in an effort to encircle Tula. By November 22 the 2nd Panzer Army had captured Stalinogorsk and Tula was deeply outflanked but its defenses were continuing to hold and the German troops were severely worn down, still lacking clothing and equipment for winter warfare. On December 2 Western Front gradually began going over to the counteroffensive. General Boldin received orders late that day to destroy the German forces advancing on Rudnevo. He committed the 740th Rifle Regiment, with nine tanks, the 32nd Tank Brigade, the 124th Tank Regiment (minus one company) to this attack from the south. By 1000 hours on December 3 two battalions of the 740th had taken Gnezdino and from 1400 were fighting for Kryukovo and meeting heavy resistance. The third battalion was advancing with 124th Tanks in conjunction with 112th Tank Division and units of the 1st Guards Cavalry Corps. A regiment of the 413th was fighting for Dorofeevka by 1400, which to some extent secured the 740th's right flank. On December 7 the 340th Rifle Division, recently transferred from 49th Army, linked up with the 740th Regiment in the Sine-Tulitsa area. By now the German threat to Tula was over and in the aftermath the 766th Rifle Regiment was granted its name as a battle honor.

== Moscow Counteroffensive ==
As 50th Army continued the first stage of its counteroffensive the 217th was operating on a front roughly 4.5km wide. On the morning of December 8 the Western Front directed Boldin to throw the German forces back to the Upa. Its center divisions (217th, 290th and 154th), advancing on converging axes where to encircle them in the Kosaya Gora–Yasnaya Polyana area:

...c) the 217th Rifle Division, with a battery from an independent guards mortar battalion, is to attack with all its forces in the direction of Mikhailkovo, Kosaya Gora, and Shchekino and by the close of December 8 take Kosaya Gora and Tolstovskii.

Overnight the division captured Nizhnee Yelkino and Pirovo from elements of the 296th Infantry Division. Overcoming stubborn resistance from this division and the Großdeutschland Regiment by the end of December 10 the Army had reached a line from Aleshnya to Prudnoe to Teploe. The 217th was then ordered to capture Yasnaya Polyana on December 11 in conjunction with the 112th Tanks. In the event the division was still fighting on the approaches to Tolstoy's birthplace on December 14. In new orders the next day the 413th and 217th were to, in cooperation with 1st Guards Cavalry, to complete the rout of the German grouping in the Shchekino–Zhitovo area after which they would turn to the west. The division continued fighting for the former place late into December 16, which finally fell the next day. Overnight the Army put itself in order and prepared for further attacks.

=== Kaluga Offensive Operation ===
A new directive from the Front on December 16, in addition to specifying the Army's objectives for December 18, also directed Boldin to form a maneuver group for striking toward Kaluga from the south in conjunction with 49th Army. This mobile group was based on the 154th Rifle and 112th Tank Divisions while the objectives of the 217th and 413th remained basically unchanged. By December 20 the 217th had reached a line from Zhitnaya to Markovo to Andreevka and was echeloned to the rear and left of the 50th Army's front with the 413th. The next day the Army's forward detachments began to liberate Kaluga, and by December 24 the division had reached the east bank of the Oka River along the sector Korekozevo–Golodskoe–Mekhovo and was preparing to attack toward Peremyshl. This town had been made into a powerful strongpoint and was defended by elements of the 137th Infantry Division. Meanwhile the 1st Guards Cavalry had captured Odoevo and reached the Oka and one rifle regiment of the division was moved to the area of Vorotynsk station in preparation for a deep envelopment of Kaluga from the southwest and west.

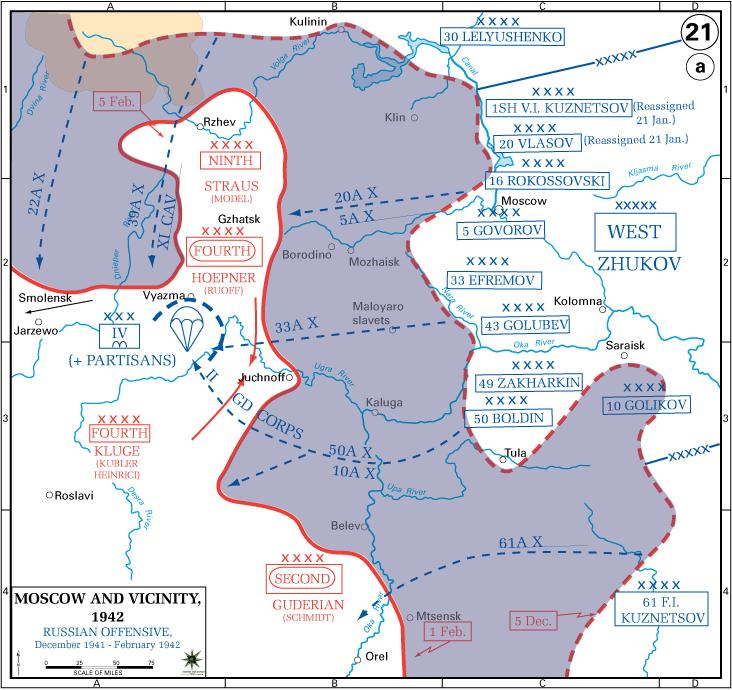
Moscow counteroffensive, December 1941 to February 1942. Note advance of 50th Army. Yukhnov is spelled "Juchnoff".

During December 24-25 the 217th fought a stubborn battle for Peremyshl, which it liberated on the second day, following which it pursued isolated units to the northwest. By this time 50th Army had advanced 110-120km since the start of the counteroffensive. Kaluga finally fell on December 30. On the same day the division reached the rail line between Maloyaroslavets and Sukhinichi along the Vysokoye–Babynino sector before continuing its advance in the direction of Uteshevo. After the fall of Kaluga, Boldin was tasked with getting the main forces of his Army into the rear of the German grouping based at Kondrovo and then to develop the pursuit in the directions of Myatlevo, Medyn and Yukhnov, while during January 1-6, 1942, the 217th and 413th continued advancing on Uteshevo. By the end of this week the Army was encountering a stronger defense and the 217th had one rifle regiment defending along a line from Troskino to Yeremino covering the flank of the shock group attacking Yukhnov. After this date the Army's forces was involved in increasingly stubborn battles along the approaches to this city where the 137th and 52nd Infantry Divisions were operating.

The division liberated Koptevo and Karmanovo on January 7 but the next day was counterattacked by infantry and up to 18 tanks operating from west of the latter place; this was beaten off. It reached the Warsaw highway by January 11 along the Pushkino–Kotilovo area but ran into heavy fighting on the approaches to both places. Three days later the division was attacked by fresh units of up to two infantry regiments and was forced back to a line from Sergievskoe to Ugolnitsa to Palatki. On January 18 the 217th and 340th Divisions with tank support unsuccessfully attacked Upryamovo three times before falling back to their jumping-off point. 50th Army's front now extended more than 70km with its troops scattered along several axes. By the end of January 22 the division, having blockaded Upryamovo, was fighting for Ploskoe and Trebushinki, but still faced stiffening resistance. On January 27 Boldin ordered the 217th to attack in the direction of Trebushinki in a further effort to bypass Yukhnov from the southwest, but with the arrival of further German reinforcements the rate of advance slowed to a crawl and the city was not finally liberated until March 5. In February the division was transferred to 49th Army. During March the 766th Rifle Regiment was disbanded due to severe losses. It was replaced by a new 766th created from the Tula Workers' Opolcheniye Rifle Regiment, which carried the name "Tula" for the duration of the war.

=== Rzhev–Vyazma Offensive ===
The offensives of Western and Kalinin Fronts had jointly created the Rzhev salient by late February. Due to counterattacks the 33rd Army, attacking toward Vyazma, had been encircled and late in February the 49th and 50th Armies received orders from Western Front to break the German lines to effect a rescue by March 27. These efforts failed and 33rd Army was mostly destroyed by mid-April. On May 2 General Trubnikov handed his command to Col. Pyotr Fyodorovich Malyshev. Trubnikov was soon appointed to deputy command of 16th Army and became a close associate of K. K. Rokossovskii, eventually gaining the rank of colonel general in February 1945.

Although plans were made for 49th Army to take a role in the summer offensives around the Rzhev salient these proved abortive. The 217th spent the summer and fall holding its lines on the salient's southeastern shoulder, rebuilding from the winter battles and in August it was again transferred, now to 16th Army, still in Western Front. On October 14 Colonel Malyshev was replaced by Col. Efim Vasilevich Ryzhikov, who came over from the headquarters of 16th Army; this officer would be promoted to the rank of major general on September 1, 1943.

=== Oryol Offensive ===
In February of 1943 the German 9th Army continued to hold the Rzhev salient although, unknown to the STAVKA, it was making preparations to evacuate. In orders issued on February 6 the re-created Bryansk Front was directed to eliminate the German Oryol–Bryansk grouping with four armies while "...the Western Front's 16th Army will attack from the Bryn', Zavod area in a general direction through Zhizdra to link up with the 13th Army's attack." These two Armies were expected to liberate Bryansk by February 23-25. In preparation the commander of 16th Army, Lt. Gen. I. K. Bagramyan, formed a shock group based on the 8th Guards Rifle Corps, which consisted of the 217th, the 11th and 31st Guards Rifle Divisions, and the 125th and 128th Rifle Brigades, supported by three tank brigades. The Corps was largely facing the 5th Panzer Division, with the 9th Panzers in reserve at Zhizdra. In the event the offensive did not begin until dawn on March 4. By this time the 9th Army had begun Operation Büffel, freeing up reserves for employment elsewhere. In four days of intense fighting the 8th Guards Corps made minimal gains of 3-4km at a heavy toll in casualties. After regrouping, Bagramyan renewed his attack on March 7 with even less success; severe losses forced a halt on March 10. Following this the two panzer divisions counterattacked on March 19 and drove the 217th and the rest of the shock group back to its initial positions.

== Operation Kutuzov ==
When 16th Army was redesignated as 11th Guards Army in May the 217th remained under its command. The fighting front was in a general lull during the spring as both sides recovered from the winter fighting and prepared for the German summer offensive. 11th Guards Army was still in Western Front, east of Kirov, on the north shoulder of the Oryol salient that was remained occupied by 2nd Panzer and 9th Armies. In this position it played no role in the defense against the German offensive but immediately after its defeat began preparations for the counteroffensive, which began on July 12. The 217th had been assigned to the 16th Guards Rifle Corps and was deployed on a 22km-wide defensive front on the Army's right (west) flank, freeing up forces for a concentrated grouping on the left flank.

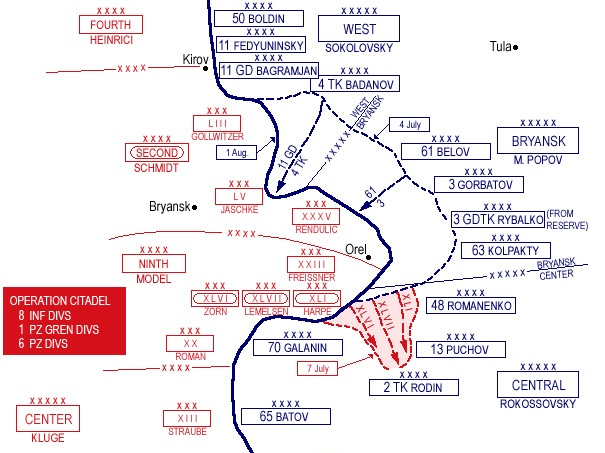
Map of Operation Kutuzov

Given its assignment the division was in the first echelon of 16th Guards Corps. The Army's main shock group was formed by the 8th and 36th Guards Rifle Corps which were to break through in the general direction of Bolkhov while the 16th Guards Corps was to broaden the breakthrough front. At 0300 hours on July 11 all the Army's first echelon divisions began a reconnaissance-in-force using reinforced rifle battalions following a 10-minute artillery onslaught. As a result of the day's fighting most of the first German trench line was captured and the main forward edge of the defense and its fire system was uncovered. The full offensive began the next day with a complex artillery preparation lasting from 0320 to 0600 when it converted to a rolling barrage. While still defending along its broad sector, the 217th attacked toward Ozerny with one rifle regiment at 1500 and captured two lines of trenches. By the close of the day 11th Guards Army had broken through the defense along a 14km front up to a depth of 12km.

=== Battles for Bolkhov ===
During July 13 the 16th Guards Corps continued to widen the breach in the direction of the right flank. By now the Army had routed two German infantry divisions and 5th Panzer and was developing the offensive toward Bolkhov while 61st Army advanced on the same objective from the northeast and east. Reacting desperately, Army Group Center rushed in reserves to halt the drive. Meanwhile 50th Army to the north had attacked unsuccessfully on July 13 and 16th Guards Corps would be forced to stretch its forces more and more to maintain contact. As a result several regroupings were carried out over the coming week and on July 18 the 36th Guards Corps was moved to the wooded area north of Kamenka where it took the 217th under command. On the morning of July 19 the Corps attacked and by day's end had reached the line Peshkovo–Krasnikovo. By now the German Bolkhov grouping had been outflanked from three sides and on July 18 it began a counterattack primarily against 61st Army which lasted two days, although with few results. At about this time the STAVKA transferred the 4th Tank Army to Western Front for commitment in this sector, as well as the 11th Army between the sectors of 50th and 11th Guards Armies. The 36th and 8th Guards Corps, with 25th Tank Corps, went back to the offensive on July 23 and by the 25th had reached the jumping-off point for a decisive attack on the Bolkhov grouping. The two Guards Corps were to break through the German defense along the Perkovo–Luchki sector, secure the commitment of 4th Tank Army into the breach, and subsequently outflank Khotynets from the east while part of their forces followed 4th Tanks in the general direction of Borilovo.

The final offensive on Bolkhov began on July 26 after an hour-long artillery preparation. 36th Guards Corps made little progress against powerful defenses. Under the circumstances the 4th Tanks had to be committed to try to make the actual breach. Despite this defensive success the German command issued orders in the evening to evacuate Bolkhov. On July 29 units of 11th Guards Army finally broke through and by the evening the 61st Army had cleared the town. The following day the Corps, in conjunction with 25th Tanks, continued a slow advance to a line from Brezhnevskii to Proletarskii.

=== Battles for Khotynets ===
By the beginning of August the 11th Guards Army had been transferred to Bryansk Front. From July 31 to August 5 the Army, along with 4th Tank Army, was involved in stubborn fighting for control of the paved road and railroad between Oryol and Bryansk. By the morning of August 6 the 11th Guards had handed over its right-flank sector to 11th Army and had regrouped for an offensive on Khotynets. 36th Guards Corps occupied a start line on a 7km-wide sector from the Vytebet River west of Ilinskoe to the northern outskirts of Brezhnevskii and was to attack with 1st Tank Corps in the direction of Studenka and Obraztsovo, outflanking Khotynets from the northwest and east. 11th Guards Army as a whole was to break through between Ilinskoe and Gnezdilovo to create a breach for 4th Tanks and then encircle and capture Khotynets before developing the offensive toward Karachev. The 217th in the Glotovo area, along with the 1st Guards Rifle Division at Nizina, formed Bagramyan's reserve.

The renewed offensive began with reconnaissance operations by each first-echelon division at 0600 hours followed by an artillery and airstrike preparation at noon. The 8th and 36th Guards Corps with heavy tank support went over to the attack at 1300 and quickly broke through the forward edge of the German defense, which was soon falling back to its intermediate line. By 1530 hours the infantry had penetrated up to 3km and the 1st Tanks was committed. Late in the day the right-flank units of 36th Guards Corps were successfully advancing and reached the approaches to Klemenovo the next morning; the Army commander now moved the 217th to the line of the Vytebet to secure the right flank of the rest of 36th Guards Corps. Despite these initial successes the German forces used broken ground and village strongpoints to delay the offensive. On August 8 units of the 25th Panzergrenadier Division appeared on the approaches to Khotynets. Further reserves arrived the next day and two armored trains were coursing along the railroad. Despite this, on August 9 fighting began on the immediate approaches to the town and individual strongpoints changed hands several times. By day's end elements of the 36th Guards Corps and the 1st Tanks were fighting along the outskirts of Abolmasovo, Voeikovo and Khotynets itself while units of 8th Guards Corps and 25th Tanks outflanked Khotynets from the south and cut the railroad. The town was now outflanked from three sides and on the morning of August 10 was completely cleared of German forces as remnants fell back to the west; the battle had cost them 7,500 officers and men, 70 armored vehicles and 176 guns and mortars. In the pursuit the next day the 36th Corps reached the eastern outskirts of Yurevo and straddled the Khotynets–Karachev road southeast of Yakovlevo.

The immediate fighting for Karachev began at 0300 hours on August 15. The German command had concentrated two infantry divisions plus remnants of two more, the 18th and 8th Panzer Divisions and the 45th Security Regiment. 11th Guards Army committed two Guards divisions against the town from the east and southeast. These were assisted in part by the 83rd Guards Rifle Division which attacked Karachev from the southeast and captured the strongpoints of Height 246.1 and Glybochka. The left-wing forces of 8th Guards Corps forced the Snezhet River after outflanking the town from the south. Having crushed German resistance along the surrounding heights and villages the Soviet forces broke into Karachev at 0830 hours and completely occupied it.

== Into Belarus ==
Beginning on September 1 the 11th Guards Army took part in the operations that liberated Bryansk. On September 19, two days after the city was cleared, the Army began withdrawing from the front lines, but the 217th was transferred to 11th Army, still in Bryansk Front, where it joined the 25th Rifle Corps. On September 15 General Ryzhikov took over command of the 16th Guards Rifle Division and handed the division over to his deputy commander, Col. Nikolai Pavlovich Massonov, who had served in that post since the previous December after having led the rebuilt 766th Regiment since April. Ryzhikov went on to serve as deputy or acting commander of 36th Guards Corps for most of the rest of the war and reached the rank of lieutenant general in 1953. As 11th Army advanced into western Russia the 217th was awarded a battle honor:

UNECHA... 217th Rifle Division (Colonel Massonov, Nikolai Pavlovich)... The troops who participated in the liberation of Unecha, by the order of the Supreme High Command of 23 September 1943, and a commendation in Moscow, are given a salute of 12 artillery salvoes from 124 guns.

Bryansk Front was disbanded on October 10 and the Army was transferred to Army Gen. K. K. Rokossovskii's Belorussian Front.

=== Gomel-Rechitsa Offensive ===
By November 9 the 11th Army had arrived along the Sozh River near Gomel, facing the XXXV Army Corps. A new offensive was to begin the following day and the Army was tasked with conducting the assault on Gomel proper while other forces of the Front liberated the nearby town of Rechitsa on the Dniepr. The Army commander, Lt. Gen. I. I. Fediuninskii, deployed his two rifle corps abreast on a 25km-wide sector from the village of Raduga, north of Gomel, to the railroad junction at Novo-Belitsa, southeast of the city. 53rd Rifle Corps was to deliver the main attack across the Sozh to encircle Gomel from the north with three rifle divisions in first echelon and three more, including the 217th, in second.

[T]he army's military council... entrusted 53rd Rifle Corps with [the] mission... to smash the defending enemy in their strongpoints, reach the Gomel – Zhlobin highway and railroad line, and, by doing so, cut the enemy withdrawal routes to the northwest. Then, linking up with 25th Rifle Corps [it was to] encircle the city and destroy the enemy's Gomel grouping.

This was to prove a tall order. The well-supported offensive began on November 12 and the Corps attacked German positions between Raduga and Kirpichni Factories but ran into very stiff resistance. The 323rd and 96th Rifle Divisions fought for three days to secure the village of Khalch, backed by the guns of 22nd Artillery Division. Khalch taken, the 217th, which had by now returned to 25th Corps, forced a crossing of the Sozh, and a general assault began on November 16. On the next day both the 96th and 323rd focused on seizing the village of Raduga, while the 217th headed for the eastern defenses of Gomel. The painful advance continued over the next several days, but German resistance finally began to flag by November 23 after the 217th captured Pokoliubichi, 8km northeast of the city's center. Soviet successes to the north and south, including the liberation of Rechitsa, forced German 9th Army to begin falling back to the Dniepr, and Gomel finally fell on November 26. On the same date the division was awarded the Order of the Red Banner.

=== Parichi-Bobruisk Offensive ===
Late in December 11th Army was disbanded and the 25th Corps was transferred to 48th Army to its south, still in Belorussian Front. The 217th was initially assigned as a separate division under direct Army command, and it would remain in this Army for the duration of the war. In the first days of January 1944 it was located west of the Dniepr near the village of Selishche. With the fall of Gomel, Rokossovskii saw the next objectives of his center armies as Parichi and Bobruisk to the northwest; the terrain along this route was excessively swampy but seen as easier to traverse in mid-winter. The commander of the Army, Lt. Gen. P. L. Romanenko, formed a shock group with his 42nd and 29th Rifle Corps with armor support and it was to launch its attack in the 15km-wide sector from Shatsilki on the Berezina southwest to Zherd Station on the Shatsilki-Kalinkovichi rail line, facing elements of XXXXI Panzer Corps. The 217th was acting as the Army reserve.

Romanenko's shock group began its assault at dawn on January 16 after a 35-minute artillery preparation. From the beginning it faced heavy resistance. After four days of bitter fighting to overcome the forward defensive belt two divisions of 29th Corps managed to make an advance of nearly 3km before running into further German strongpoints west and northwest of Shatsilki. While this advance was taking place the 217th was released to clear Shatsilki itself, which was now nearly isolated. Under pressure from Soviet forces the 253rd Infantry Division began withdrawing from the town overnight. By the sixth day of the offensive the Army had advanced up to 10km across a front of roughly 20km but German reinforcements were arriving including numerous assault guns. In order to maintain momentum Romanenko regrouped his forces, assigning the division responsibility for holding Shatsilki. A fresh assault began early on January 24, catching the German forces off-balance while preparing new defenses. The 217th advanced northward and captured the strongpoint at Rudnia before fighting its way across the Chirka River and reaching the south bank of the Berezina, in the process enveloping the left wing of the 253rd Infantry and forcing it to withdraw to Chirkovichi. By the end of January 27 the forward elements of 48th Army were just 15km from the southern outskirts of Parichi but after two weeks of heavy combat its divisions, already understrength at the outset, were utterly worn out and unable to continued without significant reinforcements and replacements.

General Rokossovskii responded by sending the 53rd Corps plus the rested and refitted 1st Guards Tank Corps to Romanenko's aid. He also directed that the offensive be resumed on February 2. The 217th, along with two other rifle divisions and the 161st Fortified Region, was assigned a largely defensive role on the right (north) wing of the Army although it took part in a reconnaissance-in-force on February 1. In four days of fighting the Army made minimal gains before Rokossovskii ordered it back to the defensive on February 6. On February 17 the STAVKA formed a 2nd Belorussian Front from Rokossovskii's left-flank armies and his front was redesignated as 1st Belorussian. 48th Army made two further efforts beginning on February 14 to improve its positions for future operations. Prior to the start the division was assigned to 29th Rifle Corps and it would remain under this headquarters, with one brief exception, for the duration. The second attack began on February 22 and struck the boundary between the 253rd and 36th Infantry Divisions with the 29th and 42nd Rifle Corps, driving forward another 5km through the swamps before being halted by German strongpoints at Pogantsy and Hill 143. The 29th Corps was initially acting in a flank guard role before marching eastward across the Berezina to reinforce the 4th Rifle Division of 25th Corps. Operations were finally halted on February 29.

== Operation Bagration ==
During the spring the Soviet forces facing Army Group Center rebuilt in preparation for a summer offensive. 48th Army was near the north flank of 1st Belorussian Front, facing the German 9th Army's strongholds at Rogachev and Zhlobin along the Dniepr, although the weight of its forces faced the latter. At the outset the 29th Corps had the 217th and 102nd Rifle Divisions under command, but was soon reinforced with the 194th Rifle Division and the 115th Fortified Region. Rokossovskii's objective in the first phase of the operation was the city of Bobruisk which would be taken in a pincer movement by 3rd Army to the north and 65th Army to the south, with 48th Army applying pressure in the center. At this time the rifle divisions of the Front averaged about 7,200 personnel each.

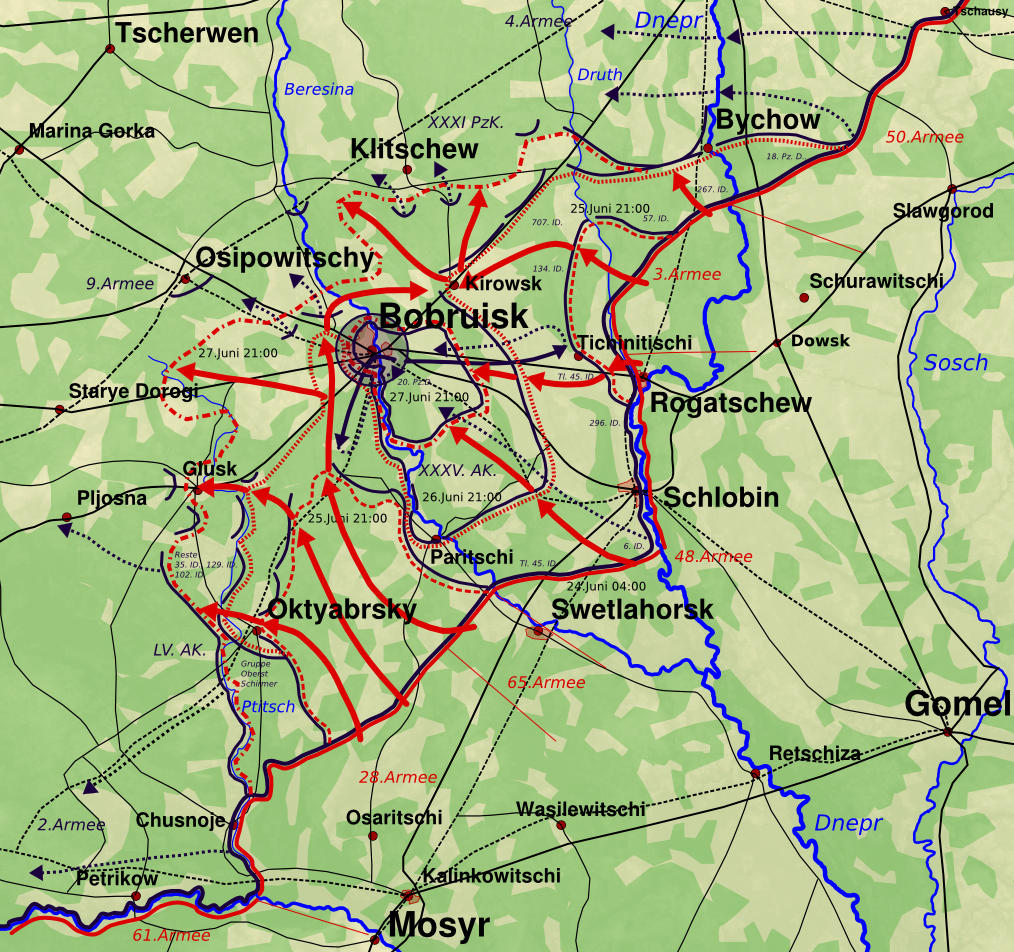
Development of the Bobruisk Operation. Note that nearly all of 48th Army began north of Rogachev.

The offensive against 9th Army opened with an artillery preparation beginning at 0200 hours on June 23. The four Corps of 48th Army, including the 29th, struck the 134th and 296th Infantry Divisions on a 20km-wide front. The 29th and 42nd Rifle Corps were expected to take Rogachev and territory to its north to assist the breakthrough of 3rd Army. On the second day at 0400 hours the two Corps unleashed another powerful artillery preparation lasting two hours against XXXV Corps at Rogachev. The terrain on the east bank of the Dniepr was mostly marshlands and the rain-swollen Drut River was difficult to bridge; despite these factors the Corps penetrated the first trench line after two hours and the second line was captured at 1130 before the German defense temporarily gelled. By evening two more trench lines had been penetrated and the leading elements were 5km west of Rogachev. The advancing infantry, with the aid of sappers, built corduroy roads for tanks and trucks. Once these were available Soviet armor and motorized infantry overwhelmed the 296th Infantry and broke into the rear. With the way clear the 9th Tank Corps began exploiting to the west, gaining 10km.

During this fighting the 217th was focused on defeating the heavily fortified German positions at the village of Strenki before advancing toward the Berezina. Meanwhile the 9th Army still had three divisions holding a narrow bridgehead east of the Dniepr on both sides of Zhlobin that were facing encirclement and the Army commander, Gen. der Inf. H. Jordan, was demanding permission to withdraw them to create reserves. This was refused, but despite this some individual battalions and battlegroups were pulled out on June 25. As the situation deteriorated the 383rd Infantry Division was ordered to move out by truck at 0900 hours on June 26 toward Bobruisk. This made little difference as the divisions were already effectively trapped. Zhlobin was cleared that evening, and on July 2 the 217th would be awarded the Order of Suvorov, 2nd Degree, for its role in this victory.

Early on the morning of June 28 the 29th Corps was continuing to mop up German remnants in the forests between Zhlobin and the Berezina but in the afternoon began a crossing in the Polovets area to relieve elements of 65th Army south of Bobruisk. However, reconnaissance by 356th Rifle Division discovered that the garrison had withdrawn to the city's center while a prisoner revealed that a breakout to the northwest was planned. By 1800 hours the Dniepr Flotilla had landed a party of the 217th in the eastern part of the city. The partially-successful breakout on June 29 considerably reduced German resistance in the city and it was cleared by 1000 hours. Within Bobruisk alone the 9th Army lost 7,000 officers and men killed and 2,000 captured, 400 guns (100 in working order), 60 knocked-out tanks and assault guns, 500 other motor vehicles, plus six supply depots and 12 trainloads of supplies and equipment.

=== Minsk Offensive ===
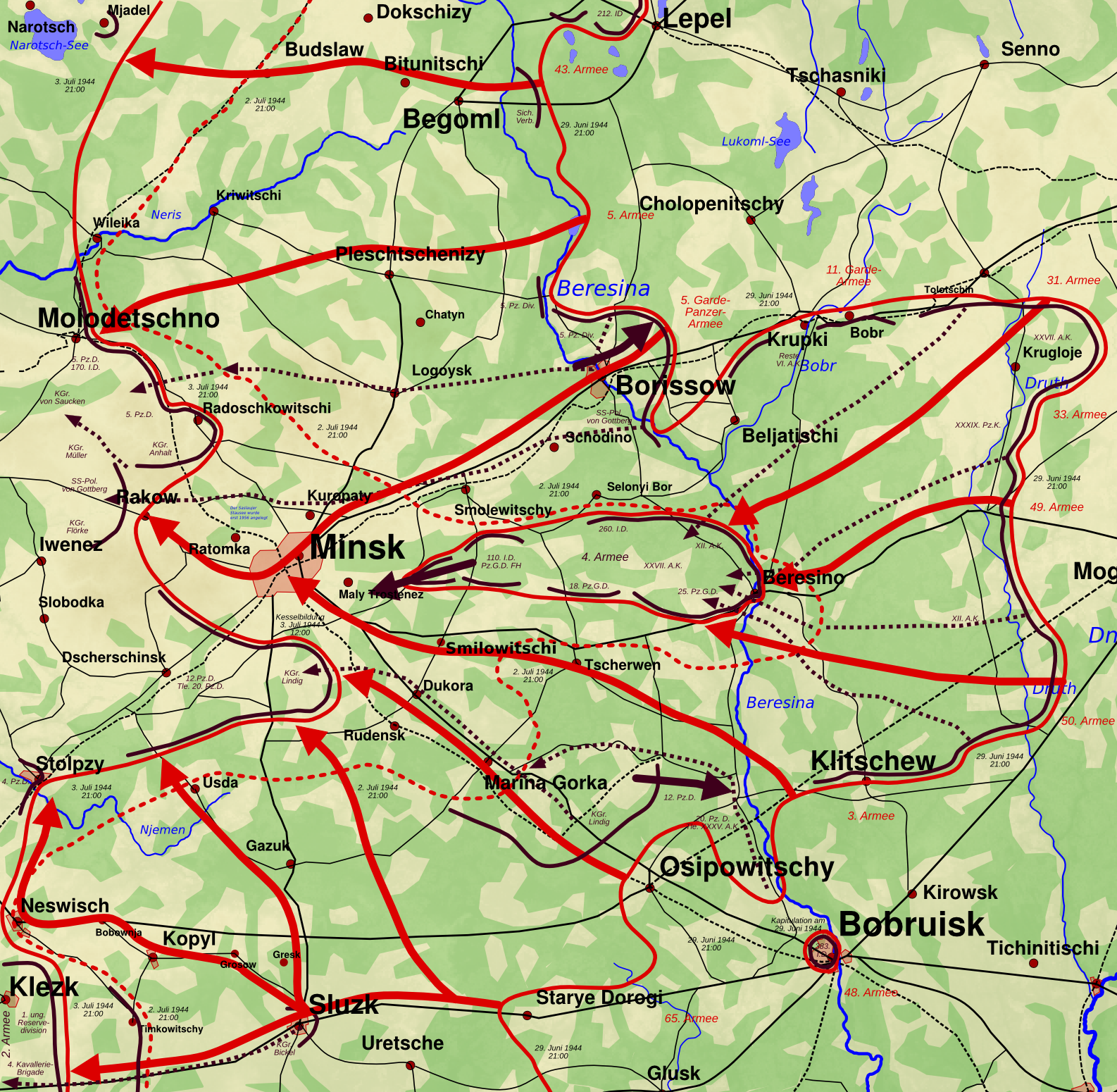
Minsk Offensive. Note initial position of 48th Army at Bobruisk.

During June 29-30 the 48th Army regrouped its forces and created a pursuit grouping consisting of the 29th and 53rd Corps with the objective of liberating the Belarusian capital. Minsk was cleared on July 3, trapping most of what remained of German 9th and 4th Armies. In the course of the offensive to this point the 217th, which had already reached Baranovichi, had officially accounted for 48 tanks and self-propelled guns destroyed; 32 mortars, 76 motor vehicles, 2,000 rifles and 300 grenades taken as trophies; plus 3,700 German soldiers and officers killed and 1,500 prisoners. The commander of 29th Corps recommended Colonel Massonov be made a Hero of the Soviet Union for his leadership and courage. As the offensive continued the division liberated the village of Svisloch, near Grodno. Massonov was advised on July 10 that he would be promoted to the rank of major general. Before this could be made official he was killed when his vehicle was blown up by a land mine on July 17. He was buried in Svisloch and was posthumously awarded the Gold Star on August 23. He was briefly replaced by the deputy commander of 29th Corps, Maj. Gen. Andrei Ivanovich Surchenko, but on July 31 Col. Grigorii Arkadevich Grigoryan took over command and led the division for the duration.

The division's victories had come at a heavy cost and in August it incorporated 1,499 replacements that included 1,200 raw recruits with minimal training. In September the 48th Army was transferred to the 2nd Belorussian Front.

== Into Poland and East Prussia ==
At the start of January 1945 the 217th was under direct Army command but returned to 29th Corps prior to the start of the Vistula-Oder offensive. At this time the Corps also commanded the 73rd and 102nd Rifle Divisions. In preparation for the offensive 48th Army was moved into the bridgehead over the Narew River at Różan. It was tasked with launching the Front's main attack in conjunction with 2nd Shock Army on a 6km front with the immediate goal of reaching Mława. The Corps was deployed along the sector from the Army's right boundary line as far as the Orzyc River and had two divisions in the first echelon.

On the first day of the offensive, January 14, the Army's forces advanced 3-6km against stubborn resistance and reached the approaches to Maków, which was taken the next day. A further gain of up to 10km was made on January 16, aided by clearing weather which allowed greater air support. While 48th Army covered another 16km the following day, the 8th Mechanized Corps, which was exploiting through the Army's breakthrough, captured the outer ring of the Mława fortified area. On the 18th the 5th Guards Tank Army completed the blockade of the town and by the evening elements of 48th Army reached its outskirts. The German garrison, consisting of remnants of 7th and 299th Infantry Divisions and the 30th Panzergrenadier Regiment, contested the major brick structures and a series of concrete pillboxes, but despite this units of 42nd Corps soon broke into the town. Heavy fighting continued overnight and by morning the garrison had been destroyed with its remnants taken prisoner while the 29th Corps stormed the important road junction and strongpoint of Przasnysz, allowing Marshal Rokossovskii to commit his 3rd Guards Cavalry Corps.

The 48th and 2nd Shock Armies now took up the pursuit northward toward the Frisches Haff, advancing as much as 30km and reaching a line from Działdowo to Bieżuń by day's end. The Armies soon crossed the boundary into East Prussia and on January 21 one of the 217th's rifle regiments won a battle honor:

TANNENBERG... 740th Rifle Regiment (Lt. Colonel Makarovich, Viktor Sergeevich)... The troops who took part in the battles when they entered the southern regions of East Prussia, during which Tannenberg and other cities were liberated, by the order of the Supreme High Command of 21 January 1945, and a commendation in Moscow, are given a salute of 20 artillery salvoes from 224 guns.

On April 26 the 755th Rifle Regiment would be awarded the Order of Suvorov, 3rd Degree, for its part in the same battles. The next day the division played a major role in the capture of Allenstein and as a result on April 5 it would receive the Order of Lenin, a rare award for a rifle division.

On January 26 the 29th and 53rd Corps were fighting along the approaches to Guttstadt and had captured Wormditt while the 42nd Corps assisted 5th Guards Tanks in capturing the towns of Tolkemit and Mühlhausen, severing land communications to the Germans' East Prussian group of forces. 48th Army now turned its front to the northeast to securely close this group's escape route. German attacks to restore communications began almost immediately. By January 30 the escape attempts had been beaten off and 5th Guards Tanks began advancing, reaching the Passarge River and fighting for Frauenburg.

=== East Prussian Offensives ===
On February 11 the 48th Army was transferred to 3rd Belorussian Front, which was now responsible for eliminating the remaining German forces in East Prussia. By this time the average of the Army's divisions did not exceed 3,500 personnel and it had only 85 tanks and self-propelled guns on strength. During late February and early March the Front prepared for a new offensive. 48th Army was to remain on the defensive against any further breakout attempts while the remainder of the Front advanced on Königsberg. It was to maintain a strong antitank defense in the direction of Braunsberg and also along the highway to Elbing. The offensive began at 1100 hours on March 13 following a 40-minute artillery preparation and the German defenses were broken into despite fierce resistance. Braunsberg was captured on March 20 and the subunits of the 217th received rewards on April 26: the 755th Rifle Regiment was awarded the Order of Kutuzov, 3rd Degree, while the 688th Artillery Regiment and the 31st Antitank Battalion were both given the Order of Aleksandr Nevsky. On March 25 the Army advanced up to 6km and captured the towns of Rossen and Runenberg. At this point it went over to the defensive and remained until the first days of May when it took part in attacks along the Baltic coast.

== Postwar ==
The men and women of the division ended the war with the full collective title of 217th Rifle, Unecha, Order of Lenin, Order of the Red Banner, Order of Suvorov Division. (Russian: 217-я стрелковая Унечская ордена Ленина Краснознамённая ордена Суворова дивизия.) In September the 48th Army was disbanded while its headquarters was repurposed as the headquarters of the Kazan Military District. The division remained in East Prussia until the spring of 1946 when it was moved to Nalchik where it was reorganized as the third formation of the 3rd Rifle Brigade. This unit was disbanded in March 1947.
