= Nizhnekasinovo =

Rural locality in Kursk Oblast, Russia

Nizhnekasinovo Нижнекасиново
- Selo
- Interactive map of Nizhnekasinovo
- Location of Nizhnekasinovo Nizhnekasinovo (Kursk Oblast)
- Coordinates: 51°49′24″N 36°00′25″E
- Country: Russia
- Federal subject: Kursk Oblast
- Administrative district: Kursky District
- SelsovietSelsoviet: Brezhnevsky

Population (2010 Census)
  - Total: 142
  - Estimate (2010): 142 (0%)

Municipal status
  - Municipal district: Kursky Municipal District
  - Rural settlement: Brezhnevsky Selsoviet Rural Settlement
- Time zone: UTC+3 (MSK)
- Postal code: 305504
- Dialing code: +7 4712
- OKTMO ID: 38620412216
- Website: brejnevskiy.rkursk.ru

Nizhnekasinovo (Russian: Нижнекасиново) is a rural locality (Russian: село, lit. 'village') in Brezhnevsky Selsoviet Rural Settlement, Kursky District, Kursk Oblast, Russia. Population: 142 (2010 census); 170 (2002 census);

== Geography ==
The village is located on the Bolshaya Kuritsa River (a right tributary of the Seym River), 90 km from the Russia–Ukraine border, 15 km north-west of Kursk, 3.5 km from the selsoviet center – Verkhnekasinovo.

Climate

Nizhnekasinovo has a warm-summer humid continental climate (Dfb in the Köppen climate classification).

== Transport ==
Nizhnekasinovo is located 5.5 km from the federal route M-2 Crimea Highway (a part of the European route E105), on the road of intermunicipal significance 38H-182 ("Crimea Highway" – Verkhnyaya Medveditsa – Razinkovo), 17.5 km from the nearest railway station Kursk (railway lines: Oryol – Kursk, Kursk – 146 km and Lgov-I – Kursk).

The rural locality is situated 20 km from Kursk Vostochny Airport, 136 km from Belgorod International Airport and 222 km from Voronezh Peter the Great Airport.
