= Khrenovets =

Rural locality in Kursk Oblast, Russia

Khrenovets Хреновец
- Village
- Interactive map of Khrenovets
- Location of Khrenovets Khrenovets (Kursk Oblast)
- Coordinates: 51°52′36″N 35°52′30″E
- Country: Russia
- Federal subject: Kursk Oblast
- Administrative district: Kursky District
- SelsovietSelsoviet: Brezhnevsky
- Elevation: 193 m (633 ft)

Population (2010 Census)
  - Total: 8
  - Estimate (2010): 8 (0%)

Municipal status
  - Municipal district: Kursky Municipal District
  - Rural settlement: Brezhnevsky Selsoviet Rural Settlement
- Time zone: UTC+3 (MSK)
- Postal code: 305507
- Dialing code: +7 4712
- OKTMO ID: 38620412196
- Website: brejnevskiy.rkursk.ru

Khrenovets (Russian: Хреновец) is a rural locality (Russian: деревня, lit. 'village') in Brezhnevsky Selsoviet Rural Settlement, Kursky District, Kursk Oblast, Russia. Population: 8 (2010 census); 24 (2002 census);

== Geography ==
The village is located on the Khrenovets Brook (a right tributary of the Malaya Kuritsa in the Seym River basin), 88.5 km from the Russia–Ukraine border, 26.5 km north-west of Kursk, 13 km from the selsoviet center – Verkhnekasinovo.

Climate

Khrenovets has a warm-summer humid continental climate (Dfb in the Köppen climate classification).

== Transport ==
Khrenovets is located 10.5 km from the federal route M-2 Crimea Highway (a part of the European route E105), 4 km from the road of intermunicipal significance 38H-182 ("Crimea Highway" – Verkhnyaya Medveditsa – Razinkovo), 27 km from the nearest railway halt Bukreyevka (railway line Oryol – Kursk).

The rural locality is situated 31 km from Kursk Vostochny Airport, 144 km from Belgorod International Airport and 231 km from Voronezh Peter the Great Airport.
