= Volobuyevka, Kursky District, Kursk Oblast =

Rural locality in Kursk Oblast, Russia

Volobuyevka Волобуевка
- Village
- Interactive map of Volobuyevka
- Location of Volobuyevka Volobuyevka (Kursk Oblast)
- Coordinates: 51°52′37″N 35°52′08″E
- Country: Russia
- Federal subject: Kursk Oblast
- Administrative district: Kursky District
- SelsovietSelsoviet: Brezhnevsky

Population (2010 Census)
  - Total: 3
  - Estimate (2010): 3 (0%)

Municipal status
  - Municipal district: Kursky Municipal District
  - Rural settlement: Brezhnevsky Selsoviet Rural Settlement
- Time zone: UTC+3 (MSK)
- Postal code: 305507
- Dialing code: +7 4712
- OKTMO ID: 38620412126
- Website: brejnevskiy.rkursk.ru

Volobuyevka (Russian: Волобуевка) is a rural locality (Russian: деревня, lit. 'village') in Brezhnevsky Selsoviet Rural Settlement, Kursky District, Kursk Oblast, Russia. Population: 3 (2010 census); 8 (2002 census);

== Geography ==
The village is located in the Bolshaya Kuritsa River basin (a right tributary of the Seym River), 88 km from the Russia–Ukraine border, 27 km north-west of Kursk, 13.5 km from the selsoviet center – Verkhnekasinovo.

Climate

Volobuyevka has a warm-summer humid continental climate (Dfb in the Köppen climate classification).

== Transport ==
Volobuyevka is located 11 km from the federal route M-2 Crimea Highway (a part of the European route E105), 4 km from the road of intermunicipal significance 38H-182 ("Crimea Highway" – Verkhnyaya Medveditsa – Razinkovo), 28 km from the nearest railway halt Bukreyevka (railway line Oryol – Kursk).

The rural locality is situated 31.5 km from Kursk Vostochny Airport, 144 km from Belgorod International Airport and 231 km from Voronezh Peter the Great Airport.
