= Novorechensky, Kursk Oblast =

Rural locality in Kursk Oblast, Russia

Novorechensky Новореченский
- Khutor
- Location of Novorechensky
- Location of Novorechensky Novorechensky (Kursk Oblast)
- Coordinates: 51°50′15″N 35°59′46″E
- Country: Russia
- Federal subject: Kursk Oblast
- Administrative district: Kursky District
- Selsoviet: Brezhnevsky

Population (2010 Census)
  - Total: 14

Municipal status
  - Municipal district: Kursky Municipal District
  - Rural settlement: Brezhnevsky Selsoviet Rural Settlement
- Time zone: UTC+3 (MSK)
- Postal code(s): 305504
- Dialing code(s): +7 4712
- OKTMO ID: 38620412226
- Website: brejnevskiy.rkursk.ru

Novorechensky (Russian: Новореченский) is a rural locality (a khutor) in Brezhnevsky Selsoviet Rural Settlement, Kursky District, Kursk Oblast, Russia. Population: 14 (2010 Census); 16 (2002 Census);

== Geography ==
The khutor is located on the Bolshaya Kuritsa River (a right tributary of the Seym River), 90 km from the Russia–Ukraine border, 18 km north-west of Kursk, 4 km from the selsoviet center – Verkhnekasinovo.

Climate

Novorechensky has a warm-summer humid continental climate (Dfb in the Köppen climate classification).

== Transport ==
Novorechensky is located 5.5 km from the federal route M-2 Crimea Highway (a part of the European route E105), 1 km from the road of intermunicipal significance 38H-182 ("Crimea Highway" – Verkhnyaya Medveditsa – Razinkovo), 19 km from the nearest railway station Kursk (railway lines: Oryol – Kursk, Kursk – 146 km and Lgov-I – Kursk).

The rural locality is situated 22 km from Kursk Vostochny Airport, 138 km from Belgorod International Airport and 223 km from Voronezh Peter the Great Airport.
