= Zhuravlin =

Rural locality in Kursk Oblast, Russia

Zhuravlin Журавлин
- Khutor
- Interactive map of Zhuravlin
- Location of Zhuravlin Zhuravlin (Kursk Oblast)
- Coordinates: 51°52′00″N 36°01′51″E
- Country: Russia
- Federal subject: Kursk Oblast
- Administrative district: Kursky District
- SelsovietSelsoviet: Nizhnemedveditsky

Population (2010 Census)
  - Total: 58
  - Estimate (2010): 58 (0%)

Municipal status
  - Municipal district: Kursky Municipal District
  - Rural settlement: Nizhnemedveditsky Selsoviet Rural Settlement
- Time zone: UTC+3 (MSK)
- Postal code: 305505
- Dialing code: +7 4712
- OKTMO ID: 38620448106
- Website: nmedvedica.rkursk.ru

Zhuravlin (Russian: Журавлин) is a rural locality (a khutor) in Nizhnemedveditsky Selsoviet Rural Settlement, Kursky District, Kursk Oblast, Russia. Population: 58 (2010 census); 57 (2002 census);

== Geography ==
The khutor is located on the Bolshaya Kuritsa River (a right tributary of the Seym River), 94 km from the Russia–Ukraine border, 18 km north-west of Kursk, 3.5 km from the selsoviet center – Verkhnyaya Medveditsa.

Climate

Zhuravlin has a warm-summer humid continental climate (Dfb in the Köppen climate classification).

== Transport ==
Zhuravlin is located 1.5 km from the federal route M-2 Crimea Highway (a part of the European route E105), 1.5 km from the road of intermunicipal significance 38H-196 ("Crimea Highway" – Dronyayevo), 17 km from the nearest railway halt Bukreyevka (railway line Oryol – Kursk).

The rural locality is situated 21.5 km from Kursk Vostochny Airport, 139 km from Belgorod International Airport and 220 km from Voronezh Peter the Great Airport.
