= Pashino, Kursk Oblast =

Rural locality in Kursk Oblast, Russia

Pashino Пашино
- Village
- Interactive map of Pashino
- Location of Pashino Pashino (Kursk Oblast)
- Coordinates: 51°53′29″N 36°03′25″E
- Country: Russia
- Federal subject: Kursk Oblast
- Administrative district: Kursky District
- SelsovietSelsoviet: Nizhnemedveditsky

Population (2010 Census)
  - Total: 35
  - Estimate (2010): 35 (0%)

Municipal status
  - Municipal district: Kursky Municipal District
  - Rural settlement: Nizhnemedveditsky Selsoviet Rural Settlement
- Time zone: UTC+3 (MSK)
- Postal code: 305504
- Dialing code: +7 4712
- OKTMO ID: 38620448131
- Website: nmedvedica.rkursk.ru

Pashino (Russian: Пашино) is a rural locality (Russian: деревня, lit. 'village') in Nizhnemedveditsky Selsoviet Rural Settlement, Kursky District, Kursk Oblast, Russia. Population: 35 (2010 census); 34 (2002 census);

== Geography ==
The village is located in the Bolshaya Kuritsa River basin (a right tributary of the Seym River), 98 km from the Russia–Ukraine border, 19 km north-west of Kursk, 4 km from the selsoviet center – Verkhnyaya Medveditsa.

Climate

Pashino has a warm-summer humid continental climate (Dfb in the Köppen climate classification).

== Transport ==
Pashino is located 1.5 km from the federal route M-2 Crimea Highway (a part of the European route E105), 1.5 km from the road of intermunicipal significance 38H-196 ("Crimea Highway" – Dronyayevo), 15.5 km from the nearest railway halt Bukreyevka (railway line Oryol – Kursk).

The rural locality is situated 22 km from Kursk Vostochny Airport, 142 km from Belgorod International Airport and 218 km from Voronezh Peter the Great Airport.
