= Kuritsa, Kursk Oblast =

Rural locality in Kursk Oblast, Russia

Kuritsa Курица
- Village
- Interactive map of Kuritsa
- Location of Kuritsa Kuritsa (Kursk Oblast)
- Coordinates: 51°53′33″N 36°02′06″E
- Country: Russia
- Federal subject: Kursk Oblast
- Administrative district: Kursky District
- SelsovietSelsoviet: Nizhnemedveditsky

Population (2010 Census)
  - Total: 135
  - Estimate (2010): 135 (0%)

Municipal status
  - Municipal district: Kursky Municipal District
  - Rural settlement: Nizhnemedveditsky Selsoviet Rural Settlement
- Time zone: UTC+3 (MSK)
- Postal code: 305505
- Dialing code: +7 4712
- OKTMO ID: 38620448171
- Website: nmedvedica.rkursk.ru

Kuritsa (Russian: Курица) is a rural locality (Russian: деревня, lit. 'village') in Nizhnemedveditsky Selsoviet Rural Settlement, Kursky District, Kursk Oblast, Russia. Population: 135 (2010 census); 134 (2002 census);

== Geography ==
The village is located on the Bolshaya Kuritsa River (a right tributary of the Seym River), 97 km from the Russia–Ukraine border, 20 km north-west of Kursk, 5 km from the selsoviet center – Verkhnyaya Medveditsa.

Climate

Kuritsa has a warm-summer humid continental climate (Dfb in the Köppen climate classification).

== Transport ==
Kuritsa is located on the federal route M-2 Crimea Highway (a part of the European route E105), 0.5 km from the road of intermunicipal significance 38H-196 ("Crimea Highway" – Dronyayevo), 17 km from the nearest railway halt Bukreyevka (railway line Oryol – Kursk).

The rural locality is situated 23 km from Kursk Vostochny Airport, 143 km from Belgorod International Airport and 220 km from Voronezh Peter the Great Airport.
