= Pronskoye, Kursk Oblast =

Rural locality in Kursk Oblast, Russia

Pronskoye Пронское
- Village
- Interactive map of Pronskoye
- Location of Pronskoye Pronskoye (Kursk Oblast)
- Coordinates: 51°51′32″N 35°53′48″E
- Country: Russia
- Federal subject: Kursk Oblast
- Administrative district: Kursky District
- SelsovietSelsoviet: Brezhnevsky

Population (2010 Census)
  - Total: 10
  - Estimate (2010): 10 (0%)

Municipal status
  - Municipal district: Kursky Municipal District
  - Rural settlement: Brezhnevsky Selsoviet Rural Settlement
- Time zone: UTC+3 (MSK)
- Postal code: 305507
- Dialing code: +7 4712
- OKTMO ID: 38620412176
- Website: brejnevskiy.rkursk.ru

Pronskoye (Russian: Пронское) is a rural locality (Russian: деревня, lit. 'village') in Brezhnevsky Selsoviet Rural Settlement, Kursky District, Kursk Oblast, Russia. Population: 10 (2010 census); 33 (2002 census);

== Geography ==
The village is located on the Malaya Kuritsa River (a right tributary of the Bolshaya Kuritsa River in the Seym River basin), 88 km from the Russia–Ukraine border, 24.5 km north-west of Kursk, 11 km from the selsoviet center – Verkhnekasinovo.

Climate

Pronskoye has a warm-summer humid continental climate (Dfb in the Köppen climate classification).

== Transport ==
Pronskoye is located 10 km from the federal route M-2 Crimea Highway (a part of the European route E105), 2 km from the road of intermunicipal significance 38H-182 ("Crimea Highway" – Verkhnyaya Medveditsa – Razinkovo), 26 km from the nearest railway halt Bukreyevka (railway line Oryol – Kursk).

The rural locality is situated 29 km from Kursk Vostochny Airport, 142 km from Belgorod International Airport and 230 km from Voronezh Peter the Great Airport.
