= Verkhnyaya Zabolot =

Rural locality in Kursk Oblast, Russia

Verkhnyaya Zabolot Верхняя Заболоть
- Village
- Interactive map of Verkhnyaya Zabolot
- Location of Verkhnyaya Zabolot Verkhnyaya Zabolot (Kursk Oblast)
- Coordinates: 51°55′56″N 35°57′01″E
- Country: Russia
- Federal subject: Kursk Oblast
- Administrative district: Kursky District
- SelsovietSelsoviet: Nizhnemedveditsky

Population (2010 Census)
  - Total: 28
  - Estimate (2010): 28 (0%)

Municipal status
  - Municipal district: Kursky Municipal District
  - Rural settlement: Nizhnemedveditsky Selsoviet Rural Settlement
- Time zone: UTC+3 (MSK)
- Postal code: 305505
- Dialing code: +7 4712
- OKTMO ID: 38620448161
- Website: nmedvedica.rkursk.ru

Verkhnyaya Zabolot (Russian: Верхняя Заболоть) is a rural locality (Russian: деревня, lit. 'village') in Nizhnemedveditsky Selsoviet Rural Settlement, Kursky District, Kursk Oblast, Russia. Population: 28 (2010 census); 52 (2002 census);

== Geography ==
The village is located in the Bolshaya Kuritsa River basin (a right tributary of the Seym River), 97 km from the Russia–Ukraine border, 27 km north-west of Kursk, 13 km from the selsoviet center – Verkhnyaya Medveditsa.

Climate

Verkhnyaya Zabolot has a warm-summer humid continental climate (Dfb in the Köppen climate classification).

== Transport ==
Verkhnyaya Zabolot is located 3 km from the federal route M-2 Crimea Highway (a part of the European route E105), 3 km from the road of intermunicipal significance 38Н-226 ("Crimea Highway" – Nizhnyaya Zabolot), 24 km from the nearest railway halt Bukreyevka (railway line Oryol – Kursk).

The rural locality is situated 30.5 km from Kursk Vostochny Airport, 148 km from Belgorod International Airport and 226 km from Voronezh Peter the Great Airport.
