= Khmelevaya, Kursk Oblast =

Rural locality in Kursk Oblast, Russia

Khmelevaya Хмелевая
- Village
- Interactive map of Khmelevaya
- Location of Khmelevaya Khmelevaya (Kursk Oblast)
- Coordinates: 51°50′29″N 36°07′37″E
- Country: Russia
- Federal subject: Kursk Oblast
- Administrative district: Kursky District
- SelsovietSelsoviet: Nizhnemedveditsky

Population (2010 Census)
  - Total: 96
  - Estimate (2010): 96 (0%)

Municipal status
  - Municipal district: Kursky Municipal District
  - Rural settlement: Nizhnemedveditsky Selsoviet Rural Settlement
- Time zone: UTC+3 (MSK)
- Postal code: 305504
- Dialing code: +7 4712
- OKTMO ID: 38620448151
- Website: nmedvedica.rkursk.ru

Khmelevaya (Russian: Хмелевая) is a rural locality (Russian: деревня, lit. 'village') in Nizhnemedveditsky Selsoviet Rural Settlement, Kursky District, Kursk Oblast, Russia. Population: 96 (2010 census); 109 (2002 census);

== Geography ==
The village is located 96.5 km from the Russia–Ukraine border, 12 km north-west of Kursk, 2.5 km from the selsoviet center – Verkhnyaya Medveditsa.

Climate

Khmelevaya has a warm-summer humid continental climate (Dfb in the Köppen climate classification).

== Transport ==
Khmelevaya is located 1 km from the federal route M-2 Crimea Highway (a part of the European route E105), on the road of intermunicipal significance 38H-253 ("Crimea Highway" – Khmelevaya), 10 km from the nearest railway halt Bukreyevka (railway line Oryol – Kursk).

The rural locality is situated 14 km from Kursk Vostochny Airport, 135 km from Belgorod International Airport and 213 km from Voronezh Peter the Great Airport.
