= Nizhnyaya Medveditsa =

Rural locality in Kursk Oblast, Russia

Nizhnyaya Medveditsa Нижняя Медведица
- Village
- Interactive map of Nizhnyaya Medveditsa
- Location of Nizhnyaya Medveditsa Nizhnyaya Medveditsa (Kursk Oblast)
- Coordinates: 51°52′03″N 36°04′16″E
- Country: Russia
- Federal subject: Kursk Oblast
- Administrative district: Kursky District
- SelsovietSelsoviet: Nizhnemedveditsky

Population (2010 Census)
  - Total: 66
  - Estimate (2010): 66 (0%)

Municipal status
  - Municipal district: Kursky Municipal District
  - Rural settlement: Nizhnemedveditsky Selsoviet Rural Settlement
- Time zone: UTC+3 (MSK)
- Postal code: 305504
- Dialing code: +7 4712
- OKTMO ID: 38620448121
- Website: nmedvedica.rkursk.ru

Nizhnyaya Medveditsa (Russian: Нижняя Медведица) is a rural locality (Russian: деревня, lit. 'village') in Nizhnemedveditsky Selsoviet Rural Settlement, Kursky District, Kursk Oblast, Russia. Population: 66 (2010 census); 80 (2002 census);

== Geography ==
The village is located in the Bolshaya Kuritsa River basin (a right tributary of the Seym River), 96 km from the Russia–Ukraine border, 16 km north-west of Kursk, 2 km from the selsoviet center – Verkhnyaya Medveditsa.

Climate

Nizhnyaya Medveditsa has a warm-summer humid continental climate (Dfb in the Köppen climate classification).

== Transport ==
Nizhnyaya Medveditsa is located 0.5 km from the federal route M-2 Crimea Highway (a part of the European route E105), 14 km from the nearest railway halt Bukreyevka (railway line Oryol – Kursk).

The rural locality is situated 19 km from Kursk Vostochny Airport, 139 km from Belgorod International Airport and 217 km from Voronezh Peter the Great Airport.
