= Tatarenkova, Kursk Oblast =

Rural locality in Kursk Oblast, Russia

Tatarenkova Татаренкова
- Village
- Interactive map of Tatarenkova
- Location of Tatarenkova Tatarenkova (Kursk Oblast)
- Coordinates: 51°48′56″N 36°08′19″E
- Country: Russia
- Federal subject: Kursk Oblast
- Administrative district: Kursky District
- SelsovietSelsoviet: Nizhnemedveditsky

Population (2010 Census)
  - Total: 492
  - Estimate (2010): 492 (0%)

Municipal status
  - Municipal district: Kursky Municipal District
  - Rural settlement: Nizhnemedveditsky Selsoviet Rural Settlement
- Time zone: UTC+3 (MSK)
- Postal code: 305516
- Dialing code: +7 4712
- OKTMO ID: 38620448141
- Website: nmedvedica.rkursk.ru

Tatarenkova (Russian: Татаренкова) is a rural locality (Russian: деревня, lit. 'village') in Nizhnemedveditsky Selsoviet Rural Settlement, Kursky District, Kursk Oblast, Russia. Population: 492 (2010 census); 523 (2002 census);

== Geography ==
The village is located 96 km from the Russia–Ukraine border, at the northern border of the town of Kursk, 5 km from the selsoviet center – Verkhnyaya Medveditsa.

Climate

Tatarenkova has a warm-summer humid continental climate (Dfb in the Köppen climate classification).

== Transport ==
Tatarenkova is located on the federal route M-2 Crimea Highway (a part of the European route E105), 9 km from the nearest railway station Kursk (railway lines: Oryol – Kursk, Kursk – 146 km and Lgov-I – Kursk).

The rural locality is situated 12 km from Kursk Vostochny Airport, 132 km from Belgorod International Airport and 212 km from Voronezh Peter the Great Airport.
