= 2nd Shemyakino =

Rural locality in Kursk Oblast, Russia

2nd Shemyakino 2-е Шемякино
- Village
- Interactive map of 2nd Shemyakino
- Location of 2nd Shemyakino 2nd Shemyakino (Kursk Oblast)
- Coordinates: 51°55′18″N 36°02′17″E
- Country: Russia
- Federal subject: Kursk Oblast
- Administrative district: Kursky District
- SelsovietSelsoviet: Nizhnemedveditsky

Population (2010 Census)
  - Total: 140
  - Estimate (2010): 140 (0%)

Municipal status
  - Municipal district: Kursky Municipal District
  - Rural settlement: Nizhnemedveditsky Selsoviet Rural Settlement
- Time zone: UTC+3 (MSK)
- Postal code: 305505
- Dialing code: +7 4712
- OKTMO ID: 38620448181
- Website: nmedvedica.rkursk.ru

2nd Shemyakino or Vtoroye Shemyakino (Russian: 2-е Шемякино, Второе Шемякино) is a rural locality (Russian: деревня, lit. 'village') in Nizhnemedveditsky Selsoviet Rural Settlement, Kursky District, Kursk Oblast, Russia. Population: 140 (2010 census); 174 (2002 census);

== Geography ==
The village is located on the Bolshaya Kuritsa River (a right tributary of the Seym River), 99 km from the Russia–Ukraine border, 23 km north-west of Kursk, 8 km from the selsoviet center – Verkhnyaya Medveditsa.

Climate

2nd Shemyakino has a warm-summer humid continental climate (Dfb in the Köppen climate classification).

== Transport ==
2nd Shemyakino is located 1.5 km from the federal route M-2 Crimea Highway (a part of the European route E105), on the road of intermunicipal significance 38Н-184 ("Crimea Highway" – 2nd Shemyakino), 18 km from the nearest railway halt Bukreyevka (railway line Oryol – Kursk).

The rural locality is situated 24.5 km from Kursk Vostochny Airport, 146 km from Belgorod International Airport and 220 km from Voronezh Peter the Great Airport.
