= 2nd Nizhnyaya Medveditsa =

Rural locality in Kursk Oblast, Russia

2nd Nizhnyaya Medveditsa 2-я Нижняя Медведица
- Village
- Interactive map of 2nd Nizhnyaya Medveditsa
- Location of 2nd Nizhnyaya Medveditsa 2nd Nizhnyaya Medveditsa (Kursk Oblast)
- Coordinates: 51°51′30″N 36°04′41″E
- Country: Russia
- Federal subject: Kursk Oblast
- Administrative district: Kursky District
- SelsovietSelsoviet: Nizhnemedveditsky

Population (2010 Census)
  - Total: 102
  - Estimate (2010): 102 (0%)

Municipal status
  - Municipal district: Kursky Municipal District
  - Rural settlement: Nizhnemedveditsky Selsoviet Rural Settlement
- Time zone: UTC+3 (MSK)
- Postal code: 305504
- Dialing code: +7 4712
- OKTMO ID: 38620448126
- Website: nmedvedica.rkursk.ru

2nd Nizhnyaya Medveditsa or Vtoraya Nizhnyaya Medveditsa (Russian: 2-я Нижняя Медведица, Вторая Нижняя Медведица) is a rural locality (Russian: деревня, lit. 'village') in Nizhnemedveditsky Selsoviet Rural Settlement, Kursky District, Kursk Oblast, Russia. Population: 102 (2010 census); 103 (2002 census);

== Geography ==
The village is located in the Bolshaya Kuritsa River basin (a right tributary of the Seym River), 96 km from the Russia–Ukraine border, 15 km north-west of Kursk, 0.5 km from the selsoviet center – Verkhnyaya Medveditsa.

Climate

2nd Nizhnyaya Medveditsa has a warm-summer humid continental climate (Dfb in the Köppen climate classification).

== Transport ==
2nd Nizhnyaya Medveditsa is located on the federal route M-2 Crimea Highway (a part of the European route E105), 13.5 km from the nearest railway halt Bukreyevka (railway line Oryol – Kursk).

The rural locality is situated 18 km from Kursk Vostochny Airport, 138 km from Belgorod International Airport and 216 km from Voronezh Peter the Great Airport.
