= Pronsky =

Pronsky (masculine), Pronskaya (feminine), or Pronskoye (neuter) may refer to:

- Pronsky District, a district of Ryazan Oblast, Russia
- Pronsky (rural locality) (Pronskaya, Pronskoye), name of several rural localities in Russia
- Pronsky (family), a princely family of Rurikid stock
