= Lipovka, Karachevsky District, Bryansk Oblast =

Lipovka Липовка
- Village
- Location within Bryansk Oblast Location within Russia
- Coordinates: 53°02′N 34°43′E
- Country: Russia
- Region: Bryansk Oblast
- District: Karachevsky District
- Time zone: UTC+3:00

Lipovka (Russian: Липовка) is a rural locality (a village) in Karachevsky District, Bryansk Oblast, Russia. The population was 43 as of 2010. There is 1 street.

== Geography ==
Lipovka is located 23 km southwest of Karachev (the district's administrative centre) by road. Sergeyevka is the nearest rural locality.
