= Kasinovsky =

Rural locality in Kursk Oblast, Russia

Kasinovsky Касиновский
- Settlement
- Interactive map of Kasinovsky
- Location of Kasinovsky Kasinovsky (Kursk Oblast)
- Coordinates: 51°48′07″N 36°08′04″E
- Country: Russia
- Federal subject: Kursk Oblast
- Administrative district: Kursky District
- SelsovietSelsoviet: Nizhnemedveditsky

Population (2010 Census)
  - Total: 629
  - Estimate (2010): 629 (0%)

Municipal status
  - Municipal district: Kursky Municipal District
  - Rural settlement: Nizhnemedveditsky Selsoviet Rural Settlement
- Time zone: UTC+3 (MSK)
- Postal code: 305516
- Dialing code: +7 4712
- OKTMO ID: 38620448111
- Website: nmedvedica.rkursk.ru

Kasinovsky (Russian: Касиновский) is a rural locality (a settlement) in Nizhnemedveditsky Selsoviet Rural Settlement, Kursky District, Kursk Oblast, Russia. Population: 629 (2010 census); 662 (2002 census);

== Geography ==
The settlement is located 94 km from the Russia–Ukraine border, in the neighborhood of the northern border of the district center – the town Kursk, 6 km from the selsoviet center – Verkhnyaya Medveditsa.

Climate

Kasinovsky has a warm-summer humid continental climate (Dfb in the Köppen climate classification).

== Transport ==
Kasinovsky is located on the federal route M-2 Crimea Highway (a part of the European route E105), 8.5 km from the nearest railway station Kursk (railway lines: Oryol – Kursk, Kursk – 146 km and Lgov-I – Kursk).

The rural locality is situated 11 km from Kursk Vostochny Airport, 131 km from Belgorod International Airport and 213 km from Voronezh Peter the Great Airport.
