= Nizhnyaya Zabolot =

Rural locality in Kursk Oblast, Russia

Nizhnyaya Zabolot Нижняя Заболоть
- Village
- Interactive map of Nizhnyaya Zabolot
- Location of Nizhnyaya Zabolot Nizhnyaya Zabolot (Kursk Oblast)
- Coordinates: 51°55′03″N 35°59′30″E
- Country: Russia
- Federal subject: Kursk Oblast
- Administrative district: Kursky District
- SelsovietSelsoviet: Nizhnemedveditsky

Population (2010 Census)
  - Total: 116
  - Estimate (2010): 116 (0%)

Municipal status
  - Municipal district: Kursky Municipal District
  - Rural settlement: Nizhnemedveditsky Selsoviet Rural Settlement
- Time zone: UTC+3 (MSK)
- Postal code: 305505
- Dialing code: +7 4712
- OKTMO ID: 38620448176
- Website: nmedvedica.rkursk.ru

Nizhnyaya Zabolot (Russian: Нижняя Заболоть) is a rural locality (Russian: деревня, lit. 'village') in Nizhnemedveditsky Selsoviet Rural Settlement, Kursky District, Kursk Oblast, Russia. Population: 116 (2010 census); 120 (2002 census);

== Geography ==
The village is located in the Bolshaya Kuritsa River basin (a right tributary of the Seym River), 97 km from the Russia–Ukraine border, 24 km north-west of Kursk, 9 km from the selsoviet center – Verkhnyaya Medveditsa.

Climate

Nizhnyaya Zabolot has a warm-summer humid continental climate (Dfb in the Köppen climate classification).

== Transport ==
Nizhnyaya Zabolot is located 1.5 km from the federal route M-2 Crimea Highway (a part of the European route E105), on the road of intermunicipal significance 38Н-226 ("Crimea Highway" – Nizhnyaya Zabolot), 21 km from the nearest railway halt Bukreyevka (railway line Oryol – Kursk).

The rural locality is situated 26 km from Kursk Vostochny Airport, 146 km from Belgorod International Airport and 223 km from Voronezh Peter the Great Airport.
