= Pronsky (rural locality) =

Set index of articles associated with the same name

Pronsky (Russian: Пронский; masculine), Pronskaya (Пронская; feminine), or Pronskoye (Пронское; neuter) is the name of several rural localities in Russia:

- Pronskoye, Kursk Oblast, a village in Brezhnevsky Selsoviet of Kursky District of Kursk Oblast
- Pronskoye, Moscow Oblast, a village in Nikolskoye Rural Settlement of Odintsovsky District of Moscow Oblast
