= Frolovka, Karachevsky District, Bryansk Oblast =

Frolovka Фроловка
- Village
- Location within Bryansk Oblast Location within Russia
- Coordinates: 53°09′N 34°41′E
- Country: Russia
- Region: Bryansk Oblast
- District: Karachevsky District
- Time zone: UTC+3:00

Frolovka (Russian: Фроловка) is a rural locality (a village) in Karachevsky District, Bryansk Oblast, Russia. The population was 126 as of 2010. There is 1 street.

== Geography ==
Frolovka is located 22 km northwest of Karachev (the district's administrative centre) by road. Krasnye Dvoriki is the nearest rural locality.
