= Frolovka, Amur Oblast =

Frolovka Фроловка
- Selo
- Location within Amur Oblast Location within Russia
- Coordinates: 51°03′N 128°45′E
- Country: Russia
- Region: Amur Oblast
- District: Seryshevsky District
- Time zone: UTC+9:00

Frolovka (Russian: Фроловка) is a rural locality (a selo) and the administrative center of Frolovsky Selsoviet of Seryshevsky District, Amur Oblast, Russia. The population was 151 as of 2018. There are 6 streets.

== Geography ==
Frolovka is located 35 km east of Seryshevo (the district's administrative centre) by road. Borispol is the nearest rural locality.
