= Dronyayevo, Kursky District, Kursk Oblast =

Rural locality in Kursk Oblast, Russia

Dronyayevo Дроняево
- Village
- Interactive map of Dronyayevo
- Location of Dronyayevo Dronyayevo (Kursk Oblast)
- Coordinates: 51°52′09″N 36°00′41″E
- Country: Russia
- Federal subject: Kursk Oblast
- Administrative district: Kursky District
- SelsovietSelsoviet: Brezhnevsky

Population (2010 Census)
  - Total: 53
  - Estimate (2010): 53 (0%)

Municipal status
  - Municipal district: Kursky Municipal District
  - Rural settlement: Brezhnevsky Selsoviet Rural Settlement
- Time zone: UTC+3 (MSK)
- Postal code: 305505
- Dialing code: +7 4712
- OKTMO ID: 38620412211
- Website: brejnevskiy.rkursk.ru

Dronyayevo (Russian: Дроняево) is a rural locality (Russian: деревня, lit. 'village') in Brezhnevsky Selsoviet Rural Settlement, Kursky District, Kursk Oblast, Russia. Population: 53 (2010 census); 81 (2002 census);

== Geography ==
The village is located on the Bolshaya Kuritsa River (a right tributary of the Seym River), 94 km from the Russia–Ukraine border, 19 km north-west of Kursk, 4 km from the selsoviet center – Verkhnekasinovo.

Climate

Dronyayevo has a warm-summer humid continental climate (Dfb in the Köppen climate classification).

== Transport ==
Dronyayevo is located 2.5 km from the federal route M-2 Crimea Highway (a part of the European route E105), on the road of intermunicipal significance 38H-196 ("Crimea Highway" – Dronyayevo), 18 km from the nearest railway halt Bukreyevka (railway line Oryol – Kursk).

The rural locality is situated 23 km from Kursk Vostochny Airport, 140 km from Belgorod International Airport and 222 km from Voronezh Peter the Great Airport.
