= Karachev =

Town in Bryansk Oblast, Russia

Karachev Карачев
- Town
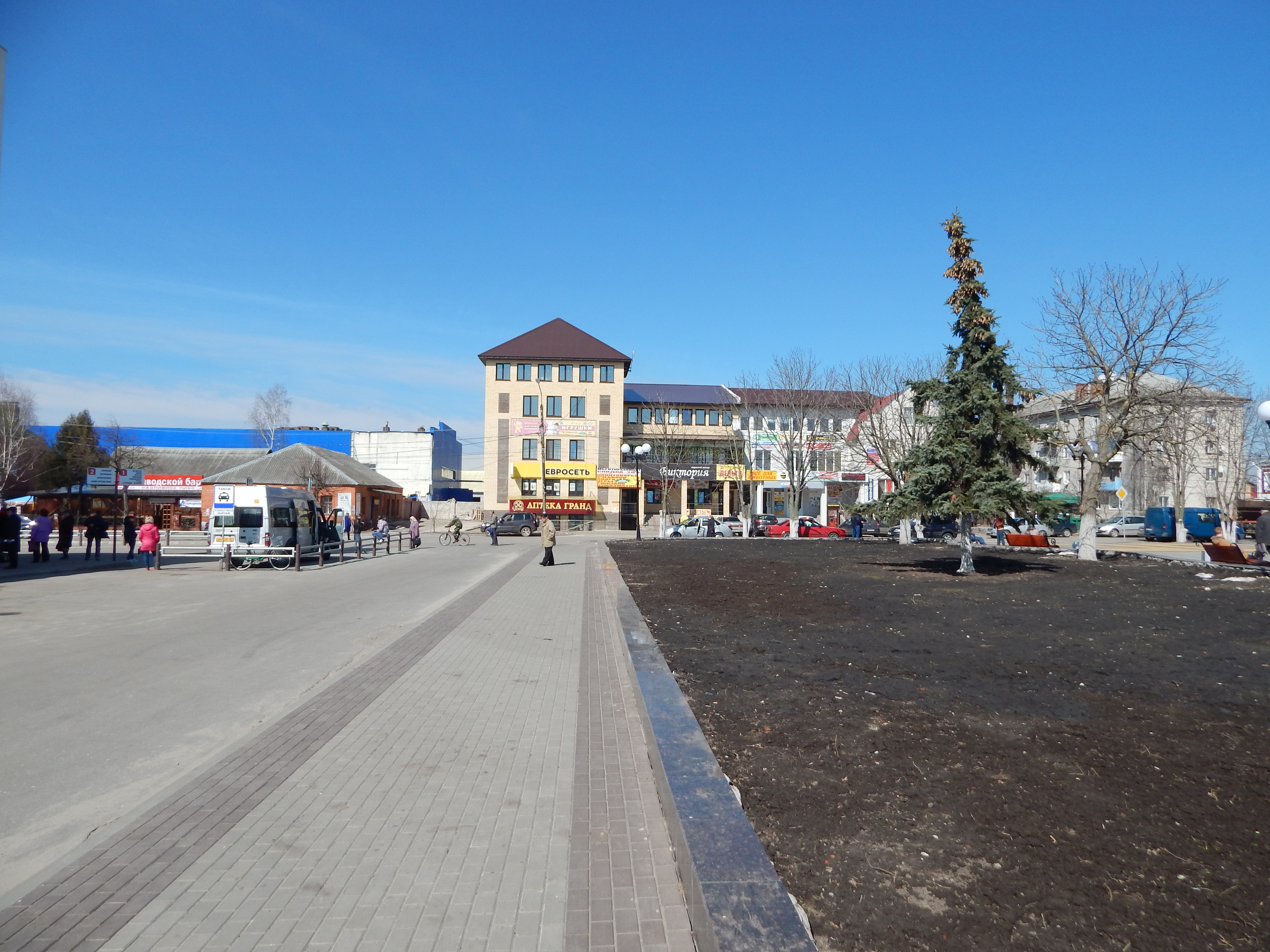
- Karachev

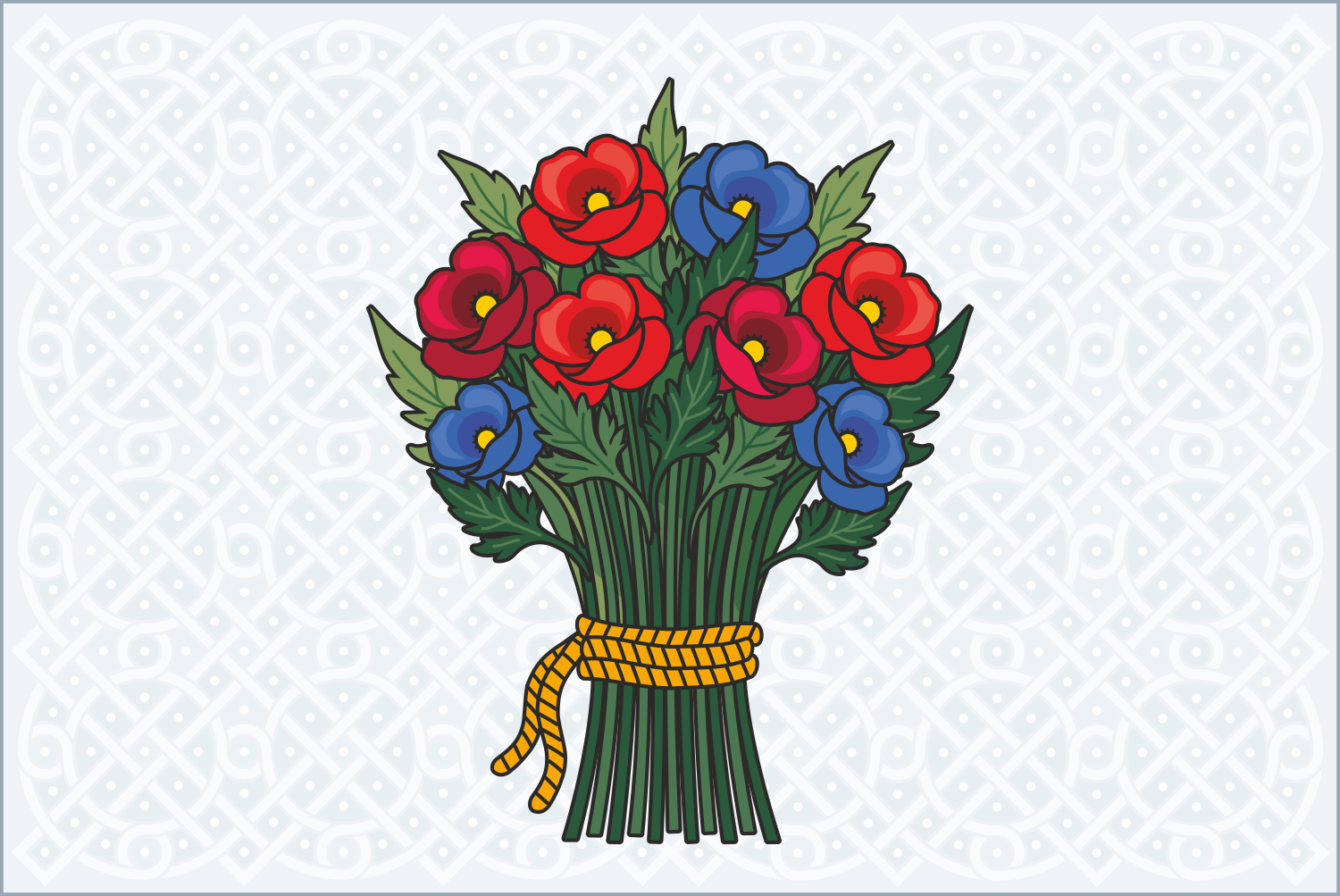
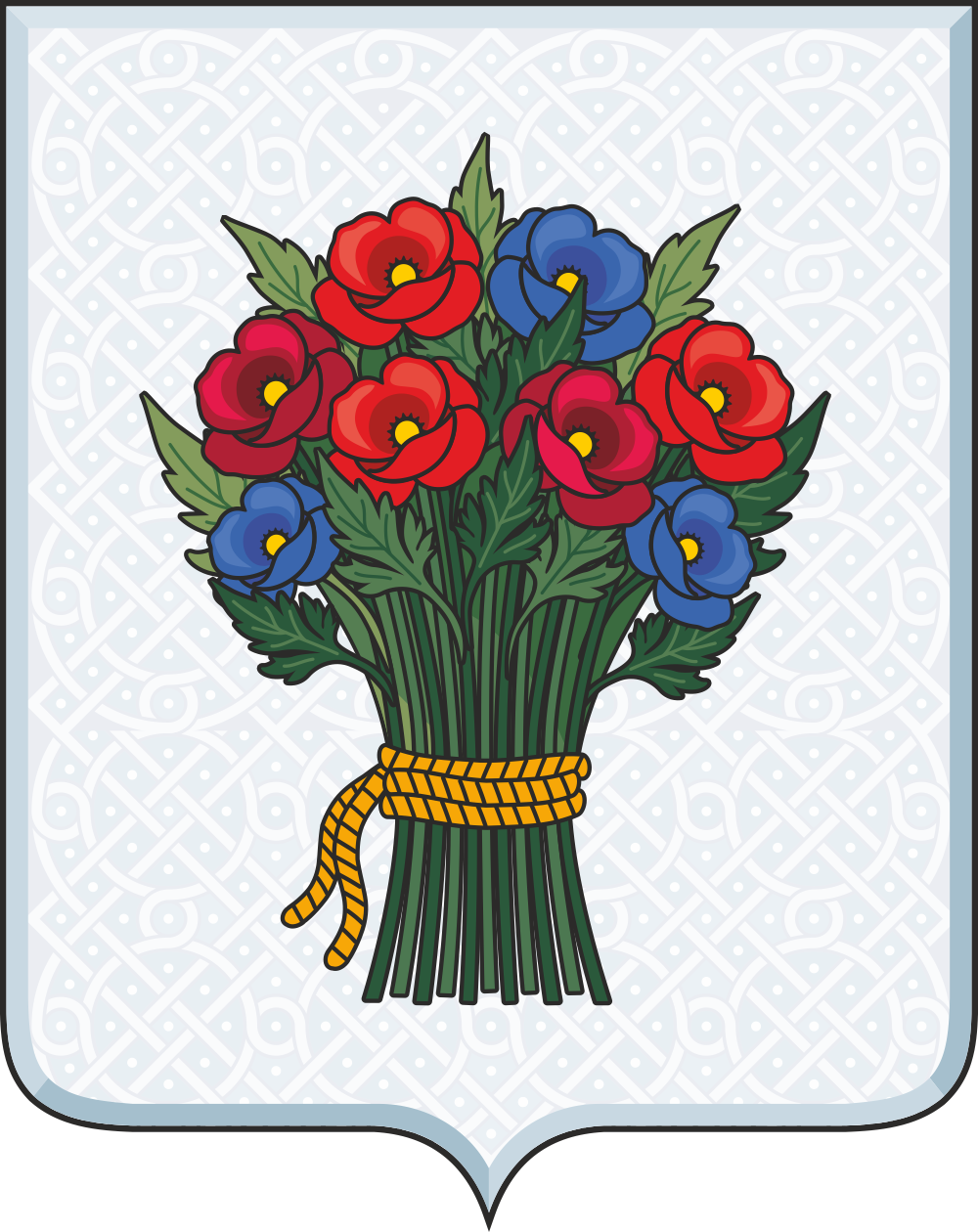
- Flag Coat of arms
- Interactive map of Karachev
- Location of Karachev Karachev (Russia) Karachev (Bryansk Oblast)
- Coordinates: 53°07′N 34°58′E
- Country: Russia
- Federal subject: Bryansk Oblast
- Administrative district: Karachevsky District
- Urban Administrative OkrugSelsoviet: Karachevsky
- First mentioned: 1146
- Elevation: 200 m (660 ft)

Population (2010 Census)
  - Total: 19,715
  - Estimate (2025): 16,593 (−15.8%)

Administrative status
  - Capital of: Karachevsky District, Karachevsky Urban Administrative Okrug

Municipal status
  - Municipal district: Karachevsky Municipal District
  - Urban settlement: Karachevskoye Urban Settlement
  - Capital of: Karachevsky Municipal District, Karachevskoye Urban Settlement
- Time zone: UTC+3 (MSK)
- Postal code: 242500
- OKTMO ID: 15624101001

Karachev (Russian: Карачев) is a town and the administrative center of Karachevsky District in Bryansk Oblast, Russia. Population: 17,449 (2021 census); 19,715 (2010 census); 20,175 (2002 census); 22,446 (1989 Soviet census).

== History ==
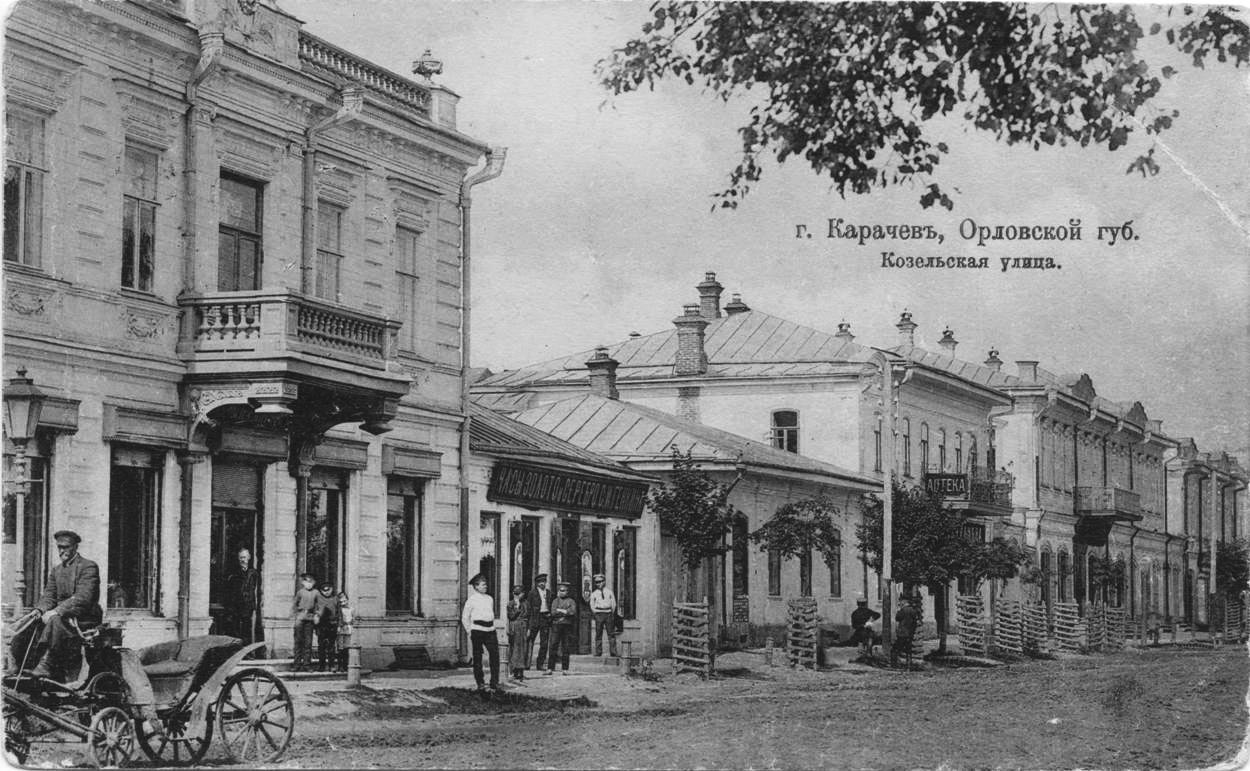
Early 20th-century view of the town

First chronicled in 1146, it was the capital of one of the Upper Oka Principalities in the Middle Ages, until its rulers moved their seats to Peremyshl. In the 14th century it became part of the Grand Duchy of Lithuania, and in 1503 it passed to the Grand Duchy of Moscow. Karachev was part of the Oryol Governorate from 1796 to 1920.

Its old architecture was heavily damaged during World War II. Karachev was occupied by the German Army from 5 October 1941 to 15 August 1943. The Germans operated a Nazi prison and temporarily also the Dulag 185 prisoner-of-war camp in the town. Local Jews were confined in a ghetto and eventually massacred by the occupiers on 12 December 1941, with some 100 victims.

== Administrative and municipal status ==
Within the framework of administrative divisions, Karachev serves as the administrative center of Karachevsky District. As an administrative division, it is, together with thirty-one rural localities, incorporated within Karachevsky District as Karachevsky Urban Administrative Okrug. As a municipal division, Karachevsky Urban Administrative Okrug is incorporated within Karachevsky Municipal District as Karachevskoye Urban Settlement.

== Infrastructure ==
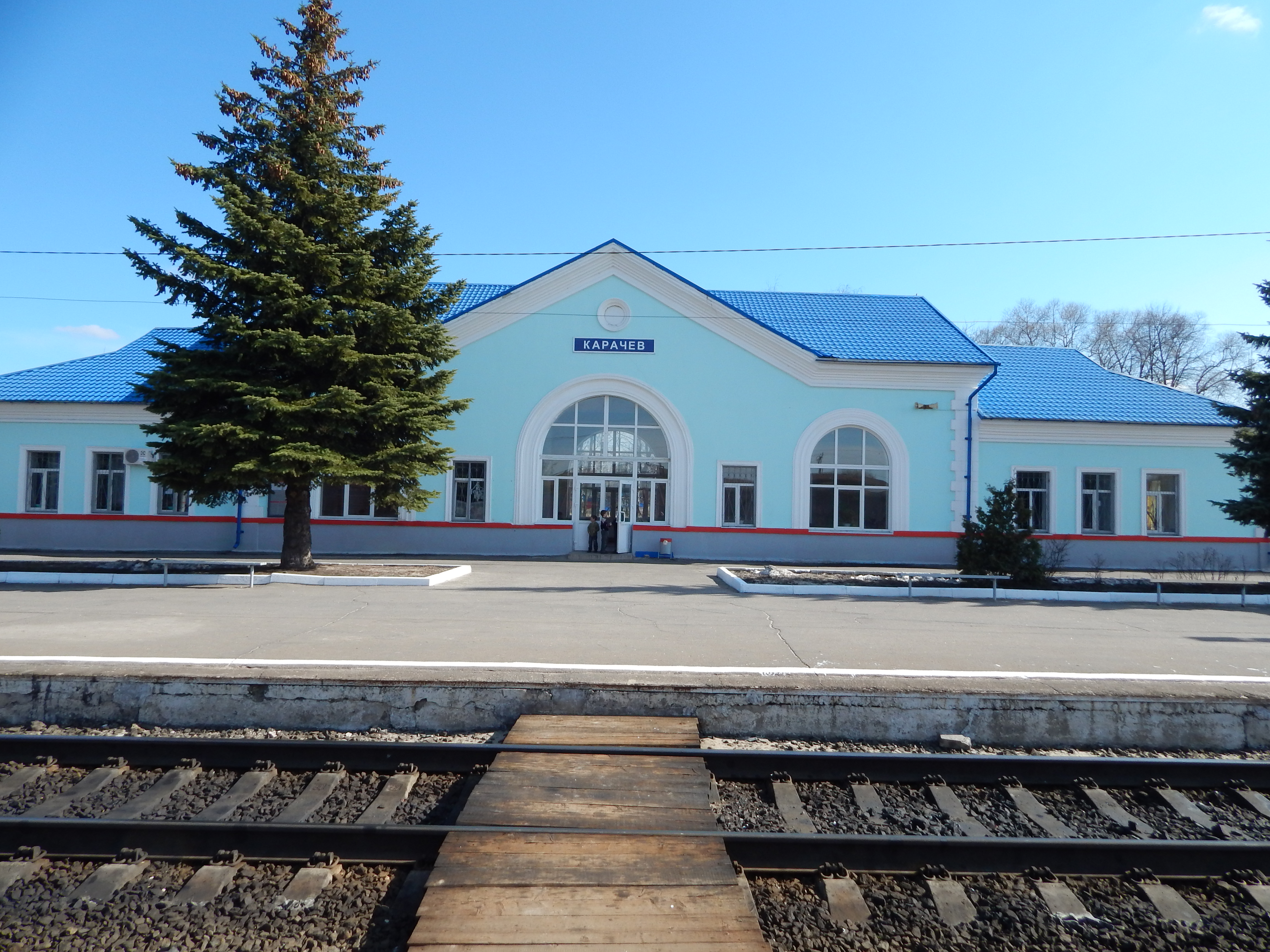
Railway station

Near Karachev, there is a 300-meter (980 ft) tall radio mast used for the CHAYKA radio navigation system.
