= Karachevsky District =

Karachevsky District Карачевский район (Russian)
- District
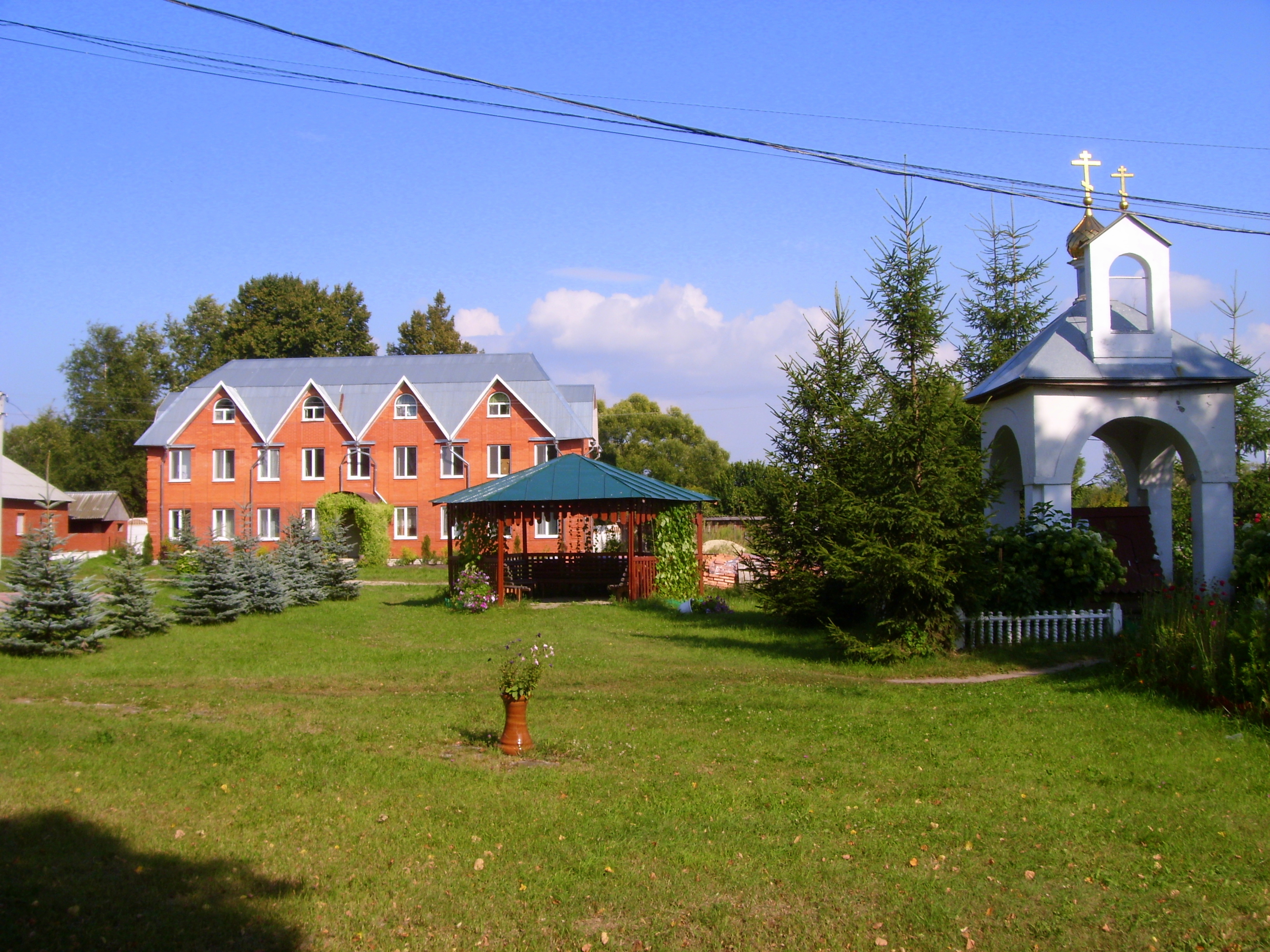
- Monastery in Karachevsky District

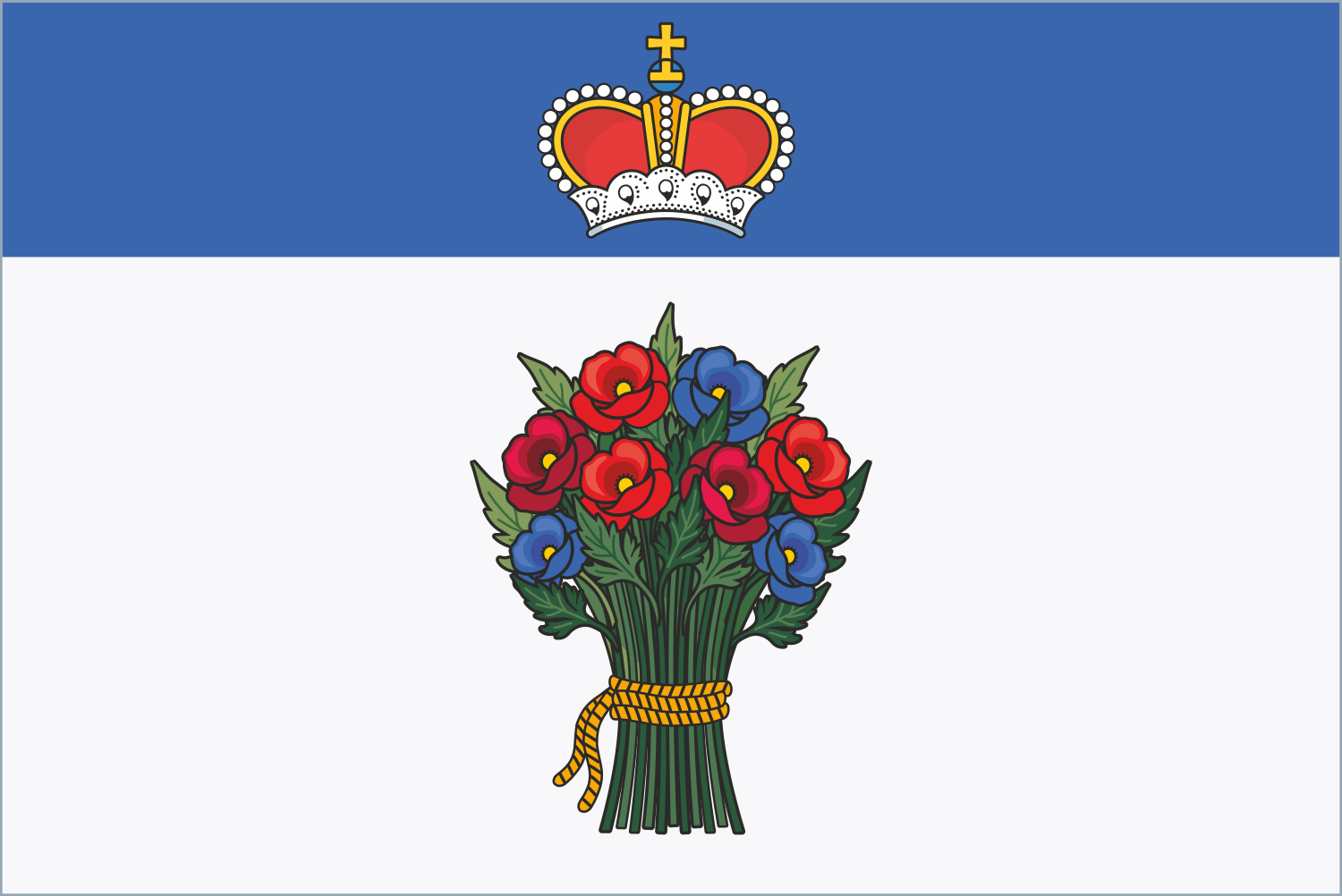
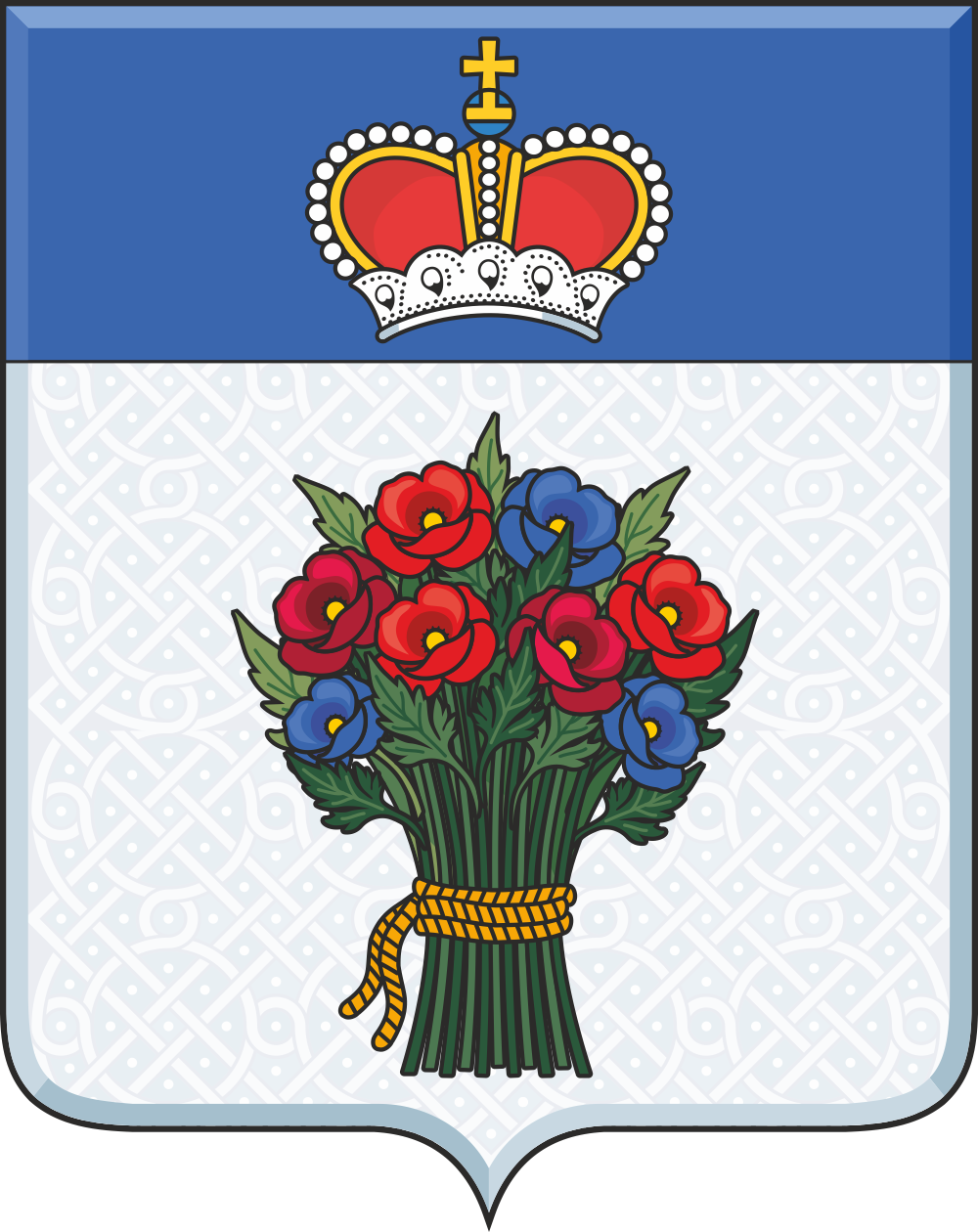
- Flag Coat of arms
- Location of Karachevsky District in Bryansk Oblast
- Coordinates: 53°07′N 34°59′E
- Country: Russia
- Federal subject: Bryansk Oblast
- Established: 1929
- Administrative center: Karachev

Area
  - Total: 1,408 km^{2} (544 sq mi)

Population (2010 Census)
  - Total: 36,036
  - Density: 25.59/km^{2} (66.29/sq mi)
  - Urban: 54.7%
  - Rural: 45.3%

Administrative structure
  - Administrative divisions: 1 Urban administrative okrugs, 7 Rural administrative okrugs
  - Inhabited localities: 1 cities/towns, 128 rural localities

Municipal structure
  - Municipally incorporated as: Karachevsky Municipal District
  - Municipal divisions: 1 urban settlements, 7 rural settlements
- Time zone: UTC+3 (MSK)
- OKTMO ID: 15624000
- Website: http://karadmin.ru/

Karachevsky District (Russian: Кара́чевский райо́н) is an administrative and municipal district (raion), one of the twenty-seven in Bryansk Oblast, Russia. It is located in the east of the oblast. The area of the district is 1,408 square kilometers (544 sq mi). Its administrative center is the town of Karachev. Population: 32,279 (2021 census); 36,036 (2010 census); 37,857 (2002 Census); 41,428 (1989 Soviet census). The population of Karachev accounts for 54.1% of the district's total population.
