= Verkhnekasinovo =

Rural locality in Kursk Oblast, Russia

Verkhnekasinovo Верхнекасиново
- Selo
- Interactive map of Verkhnekasinovo
- Location of Verkhnekasinovo Verkhnekasinovo (Kursk Oblast)
- Coordinates: 51°50′00″N 36°03′20″E
- Country: Russia
- Federal subject: Kursk Oblast
- Administrative district: Kursky District
- SelsovietSelsoviet: Brezhnevsky

Population (2010 Census)
  - Total: 430
  - Estimate (2010): 430 (0%)

Administrative status
  - Capital of: Brezhnevsky Selsoviet

Municipal status
  - Municipal district: Kursky Municipal District
  - Rural settlement: Brezhnevsky Selsoviet Rural Settlement
  - Capital of: Brezhnevsky Selsoviet Rural Settlement
- Time zone: UTC+3 (MSK)
- Postal code: 305504
- Dialing code: +7 4712
- OKTMO ID: 38620412101
- Website: brejnevskiy.rkursk.ru

Verkhnekasinovo (Russian: Верхнекасиново) is a rural locality (Russian: село, lit. 'village') and the administrative center of Brezhnevsky Selsoviet Rural Settlement, Kursky District, Kursk Oblast, Russia. Population: 430 (2010 census); 447 (2002 census);

== Geography ==
The village is located 93 km from the Russia–Ukraine border, 14 km north-west of Kursk.

Climate

Verkhnekasinovo has a warm-summer humid continental climate (Dfb in the Köppen climate classification).

Climate data for Verkhnekasinovo
Month	Jan	Feb	Mar	Apr	May	Jun	Jul	Aug	Sep	Oct	Nov	Dec	Year
Mean daily maximum °C (°F)	−4.3 (24.3)	−3.3 (26.1)	2.5 (36.5)	12.9 (55.2)	19.2 (66.6)	22.5 (72.5)	25.2 (77.4)	24.5 (76.1)	18 (64)	10.4 (50.7)	3.2 (37.8)	−1.4 (29.5)	10.8 (51.4)
Daily mean °C (°F)	−6.4 (20.5)	−5.9 (21.4)	−1.1 (30.0)	8 (46)	14.6 (58.3)	18.2 (64.8)	20.8 (69.4)	19.9 (67.8)	13.9 (57.0)	7.1 (44.8)	1 (34)	−3.3 (26.1)	7.2 (45.0)
Mean daily minimum °C (°F)	−8.9 (16.0)	−9 (16)	−5.2 (22.6)	2.5 (36.5)	8.9 (48.0)	12.8 (55.0)	15.7 (60.3)	14.7 (58.5)	9.6 (49.3)	3.8 (38.8)	−1.4 (29.5)	−5.5 (22.1)	3.2 (37.7)
Average precipitation mm (inches)	51 (2.0)	45 (1.8)	47 (1.9)	50 (2.0)	62 (2.4)	71 (2.8)	73 (2.9)	55 (2.2)	59 (2.3)	59 (2.3)	47 (1.9)	49 (1.9)	668 (26.4)
Source: https://en.climate-data.org/asia/russian-federation/kursk-oblast/верхнекасиново-656074/

== Transport ==
Verkhnekasinovo is located 2.5 km from the federal route M-2 Crimea Highway (a part of the European route E105), on the road of intermunicipal significance 38H-182 ("Crimea Highway" – Verkhnyaya Medveditsa – Razinkovo), 15 km from the nearest railway halt Bukreyevka (railway line Oryol – Kursk).

The rural locality is situated 18 km from Kursk Vostochny Airport, 136 km from Belgorod International Airport and 218 km from Voronezh Peter the Great Airport.
