= Razinkovo, Kursk Oblast =

Rural locality in Kursk Oblast, Russia

Razinkovo Разиньково
- Village
- Interactive map of Razinkovo
- Location of Razinkovo Razinkovo (Kursk Oblast)
- Coordinates: 51°50′42″N 35°55′31″E
- Country: Russia
- Federal subject: Kursk Oblast
- Administrative district: Kursky District
- SelsovietSelsoviet: Brezhnevsky

Population (2010 Census)
  - Total: 298
  - Estimate (2010): 298 (0%)

Municipal status
  - Municipal district: Kursky Municipal District
  - Rural settlement: Brezhnevsky Selsoviet Rural Settlement
- Time zone: UTC+3 (MSK)
- Postal code: 305507
- Dialing code: +7 4712
- OKTMO ID: 38620412106
- Website: brejnevskiy.rkursk.ru

Razinkovo (Russian: Разиньково) is a rural locality (Russian: деревня, lit. 'village') in Brezhnevsky Selsoviet Rural Settlement, Kursky District, Kursk Oblast, Russia. Population: 298 (2010 census); 282 (2002 census);

== Geography ==
The village is located on the Malaya Kuritsa River (a right tributary of the Bolshaya Kuritsa River in the Seym River basin), 88 km from the Russia–Ukraine border, 21 km north-west of Kursk, 9 km from the selsoviet center – Verkhnekasinovo.

Climate

Razinkovo has a warm-summer humid continental climate (Dfb in the Köppen climate classification).

Climate data for Razinkovo
Month	Jan	Feb	Mar	Apr	May	Jun	Jul	Aug	Sep	Oct	Nov	Dec	Year
Mean daily maximum °C (°F)	−4.3 (24.3)	−3.3 (26.1)	2.5 (36.5)	12.8 (55.0)	19.2 (66.6)	22.4 (72.3)	25.1 (77.2)	24.4 (75.9)	18 (64)	10.4 (50.7)	3.2 (37.8)	−1.3 (29.7)	10.8 (51.3)
Daily mean °C (°F)	−6.3 (20.7)	−5.8 (21.6)	−1.1 (30.0)	8 (46)	14.5 (58.1)	18.2 (64.8)	20.8 (69.4)	19.8 (67.6)	13.8 (56.8)	7.1 (44.8)	1 (34)	−3.3 (26.1)	7.2 (45.0)
Mean daily minimum °C (°F)	−8.8 (16.2)	−8.9 (16.0)	−5.1 (22.8)	2.5 (36.5)	8.9 (48.0)	12.8 (55.0)	15.7 (60.3)	14.7 (58.5)	9.6 (49.3)	3.8 (38.8)	−1.3 (29.7)	−5.5 (22.1)	3.2 (37.8)
Average precipitation mm (inches)	51 (2.0)	45 (1.8)	47 (1.9)	50 (2.0)	62 (2.4)	71 (2.8)	73 (2.9)	55 (2.2)	59 (2.3)	59 (2.3)	47 (1.9)	49 (1.9)	668 (26.4)
Source: https://en.climate-data.org/asia/russian-federation/kursk-oblast/разиньково-527162/

== Transport ==
Razinkovo is located 9 km from the federal route M-2 Crimea Highway (a part of the European route E105), on the road of intermunicipal significance 38H-182 ("Crimea Highway" – Verkhnyaya Medveditsa – Razinkovo), 23 km from the nearest railway station Kursk (railway lines: Oryol – Kursk, Kursk – 146 km and Lgov-I – Kursk).

The rural locality is situated 26.5 km from Kursk Vostochny Airport, 140 km from Belgorod International Airport and 227 km from Voronezh Peter the Great Airport.
