= Verkhnyaya Medveditsa =

Rural locality in Kursk Oblast, Russia

Verkhnyaya Medveditsa Верхняя Медведица
- Village
- Interactive map of Verkhnyaya Medveditsa
- Location of Verkhnyaya Medveditsa Verkhnyaya Medveditsa (Kursk Oblast)
- Coordinates: 51°50′48″N 36°05′39″E
- Country: Russia
- Federal subject: Kursk Oblast
- Administrative district: Kursky District
- SelsovietSelsoviet: Nizhnemedveditsky

Population (2010 Census)
  - Total: 552
  - Estimate (2010): 552 (0%)

Administrative status
  - Capital of: Nizhnemedveditsky Selsoviet

Municipal status
  - Municipal district: Kursky Municipal District
  - Rural settlement: Nizhnemedveditsky Selsoviet Rural Settlement
  - Capital of: Nizhnemedveditsky Selsoviet Rural Settlement
- Time zone: UTC+3 (MSK)
- Postal code: 305504
- Dialing code: +7 4712
- OKTMO ID: 38620448101
- Website: nmedvedica.rkursk.ru

Verkhnyaya Medveditsa (Russian: Верхняя Медведица) is a rural locality (Russian: деревня, lit. 'village') and the administrative center of Nizhnemedveditsky Selsoviet Rural Settlement, Kursky District, Kursk Oblast, Russia. Population: 552 (2010 census); 586 (2002 census);

== Geography ==
The village is located 95.5 km from the Russia–Ukraine border, 14 km north-west of Kursk.

Climate

Verkhnyaya Medveditsa has a warm-summer humid continental climate (Dfb in the Köppen climate classification).

Climate data for Verkhnyaya Medveditsa
Month	Jan	Feb	Mar	Apr	May	Jun	Jul	Aug	Sep	Oct	Nov	Dec	Year
Mean daily maximum °C (°F)	−4.3 (24.3)	−3.3 (26.1)	2.5 (36.5)	12.9 (55.2)	19.2 (66.6)	22.5 (72.5)	25.2 (77.4)	24.5 (76.1)	18 (64)	10.4 (50.7)	3.2 (37.8)	−1.4 (29.5)	10.8 (51.4)
Daily mean °C (°F)	−6.4 (20.5)	−5.9 (21.4)	−1.1 (30.0)	8 (46)	14.6 (58.3)	18.2 (64.8)	20.8 (69.4)	19.9 (67.8)	13.9 (57.0)	7.1 (44.8)	1 (34)	−3.3 (26.1)	7.2 (45.0)
Mean daily minimum °C (°F)	−8.9 (16.0)	−9 (16)	−5.2 (22.6)	2.5 (36.5)	8.9 (48.0)	12.8 (55.0)	15.7 (60.3)	14.7 (58.5)	9.6 (49.3)	3.8 (38.8)	−1.4 (29.5)	−5.5 (22.1)	3.2 (37.7)
Average precipitation mm (inches)	51 (2.0)	45 (1.8)	47 (1.9)	50 (2.0)	62 (2.4)	71 (2.8)	73 (2.9)	55 (2.2)	59 (2.3)	59 (2.3)	47 (1.9)	49 (1.9)	668 (26.4)
Source: https://en.climate-data.org/asia/russian-federation/kursk-oblast/верхняя-медведица-294554/

== Transport ==
Verkhnyaya Medveditsa is located on the federal route M-2 Crimea Highway (a part of the European route E105), on the road of intermunicipal significance 38H-182 ("Crimea Highway" – Verkhnyaya Medveditsa – Razinkovo), 12 km from the nearest railway halt Bukreyevka (railway line Oryol – Kursk).

The rural locality is situated 16.5 km from Kursk Vostochny Airport, 137 km from Belgorod International Airport and 216 km from Voronezh Peter the Great Airport.
