= 2nd Vinnikovo =

Rural locality in Kursk Oblast, Russia

2nd Vinnikovo 2-е Винниково
- Selo
- Interactive map of 2nd Vinnikovo
- Location of 2nd Vinnikovo 2nd Vinnikovo (Kursk Oblast)
- Coordinates: 51°49′13″N 36°29′28″E
- Country: Russia
- Federal subject: Kursk Oblast
- Administrative district: Kursky District
- SelsovietSelsoviet: Vinnikovsky

Population (2010 Census)
  - Total: 57
  - Estimate (2010): 57 (0%)

Municipal status
  - Municipal district: Kursky Municipal District
  - Rural settlement: Vinnikovsky Selsoviet Rural Settlement
- Time zone: UTC+3 (MSK)
- Postal code: 305510
- Dialing code: +7 4712
- OKTMO ID: 38620420106
- Website: vinnikovo.rkursk.ru

2nd Vinnikovo or Vtoroye Vinnikovo (Russian: 2-е Винниково, Второе Винниково) is a rural locality (Russian: село, lit. 'village') in Vinnikovsky Selsoviet Rural Settlement, Kursky District, Kursk Oblast, Russia. Population: 57 (2010 census); 58 (2002 census);

== Geography ==
The village is located on the Vinogrobl River (a left tributary of the Tuskar in the basin of the Seym), 114 km from the Russia–Ukraine border, 16 km north-east of the district center – the town Kursk, 1 km from the selsoviet center – 1st Vinnikovo.

Climate

2nd Vinnikovo has a warm-summer humid continental climate (Dfb in the Köppen climate classification).

== Transport ==
2nd Vinnikovo is located 11 km from the federal route P-298 (Kursk – Voronezh – P-22 "Kaspy" Highway; a part of the European route E38), 3 km from the road of regional importance 38K-016 (Kursk – Kastornoye), on the road of intermunicipal significance 38H-317 (38K-016 – 1st Vinnikovo – Lipovets, with the access road to Malinovy), 3.5 km from the nearest railway station Otreshkovo (railway line Kursk – 146 km).

The rural locality is situated 16 km from Kursk Vostochny Airport, 129 km from Belgorod International Airport and 189 km from Voronezh Peter the Great Airport.
