= Troitsa, Kursk Oblast =

Rural locality in Kursk Oblast, Russia

Troitsa Троица
- Selo
- Interactive map of Troitsa
- Location of Troitsa Troitsa (Kursk Oblast)
- Coordinates: 51°45′31″N 36°34′32″E
- Country: Russia
- Federal subject: Kursk Oblast
- Administrative district: Kursky District
- SelsovietSelsoviet: Besedinsky

Population (2010 Census)
  - Total: 67
  - Estimate (2010): 67 (0%)

Municipal status
  - Municipal district: Kursky Municipal District
  - Rural settlement: Besedinsky Selsoviet Rural Settlement
- Time zone: UTC+3 (MSK)
- Postal code: 305501
- Dialing code: +7 4712
- OKTMO ID: 38620408211
- Website: besedino.rkursk.ru

Troitsa (Russian: Троица) is a rural locality (Russian: село, lit. 'village') in Besedinsky Selsoviet Rural Settlement, Kursky District, Kursk Oblast, Russia. Population: 67 (2010 census); 97 (2002 census);

== Geography ==
The village is located on the Rat River (a right tributary of the Seym), 114 km from the Russia–Ukraine border, 21 km east of the district center – the town Kursk, 7.5 km from the selsoviet center – Besedino.

Climate

Troitsa has a warm-summer humid continental climate (Dfb in the Köppen climate classification).

== Transport ==
Troitsa is located 7 km from the federal route P-298 (Kursk – Voronezh – P-22 "Kaspy" Highway; a part of the European route E38), 5 km from the road of regional importance 38K-016 (Kursk – Kastornoye), on the roads of intermunicipal significance 38H-530 (Otreshkovo – Petrovskoye – Besedino) and 38H-529 (38N-530 – Troitsa – 2nd Pisklovo), 6.5 km from the nearest railway station Otreshkovo (railway line Kursk – 146 km).

The rural locality is situated 20 km from Kursk Vostochny Airport, 122 km from Belgorod International Airport and 183 km from Voronezh Peter the Great Airport.
