= Kutepova, Kursk Oblast =

Rural locality in Kursk Oblast, Russia

Kutepova Кутепова
- Village
- Interactive map of Kutepova
- Location of Kutepova Kutepova (Kursk Oblast)
- Coordinates: 51°41′40″N 36°26′42″E
- Country: Russia
- Federal subject: Kursk Oblast
- Administrative district: Kursky District
- SelsovietSelsoviet: Besedinsky

Population (2010 Census)
  - Total: 53
  - Estimate (2010): 53 (0%)

Municipal status
  - Municipal district: Kursky Municipal District
  - Rural settlement: Besedinsky Selsoviet Rural Settlement
- Time zone: UTC+3 (MSK)
- Postal code: 305501
- Dialing code: +7 4712
- OKTMO ID: 38620408161
- Website: besedino.rkursk.ru

Kutepova (Russian: Кутепова) is a rural locality (Russian: деревня, lit. 'village') in Besedinsky Selsoviet Rural Settlement, Kursky District, Kursk Oblast, Russia. Population: 53 (2010 census); 58 (2002 census);

== Geography ==
The village is located on the Rat River (a right tributary of the Seym), 102 km from the Russia–Ukraine border, 13 km south-east of the district center – the town Kursk, 2 km from the selsoviet center – Besedino.

Climate

Kutepova has a warm-summer humid continental climate (Dfb in the Köppen climate classification).

== Transport ==
Kutepova is located 2.5 km from the federal route P-298 (Kursk – Voronezh – P-22 "Kaspy" Highway; a part of the European route E38), on the road of intermunicipal significance 38H-259 (R-298 – Belomestnoye – Kuvshinnoye), 7 km from the nearest railway station Konaryovo (railway line Klyukva — Belgorod).

The rural locality is situated 14 km from Kursk Vostochny Airport, 116 km from Belgorod International Airport and 193 km from Voronezh Peter the Great Airport.
