= 1st Anpilogovo =

Rural locality in Kursk Oblast, Russia

1st Anpilogovo 1-е Анпилогово
- Village
- Location of 1st Anpilogovo
- Location of 1st Anpilogovo 1st Anpilogovo (Kursk Oblast)
- Coordinates: 51°46′42″N 36°00′24″E
- Country: Russia
- Federal subject: Kursk Oblast
- Administrative district: Kursky District
- Selsoviet: Polyansky

Population (2010 Census)
  - Total: 180

Municipal status
  - Municipal district: Kursky Municipal District
  - Rural settlement: Polyansky Selsoviet Rural Settlement
- Time zone: UTC+3 (MSK)
- Postal code(s): 305521
- Dialing code(s): +7 4712
- OKTMO ID: 38620472106
- Website: polanskoe.rkursk.ru

1st Anpilogovo or Pervoye Anpilogovo (Russian: 1-е Анпилогово, Первое Анпилогово) is a rural locality (Russian: деревня, lit. 'village') in Polyansky Selsoviet Rural Settlement, Kursky District, Kursk Oblast, Russia. Population: 180 (2010 Census); 195 (2002 Census);

== Geography ==
The village is located on the Bolshaya Kuritsa River (a right tributary of the Seym River), 86 km from the Russia–Ukraine border, 13 km north-west of Kursk, 2 km from the selsoviet center – Polyanskoye.

=== Climate ===
1st Anpilogovo has a warm-summer humid continental climate (Dfb in the Köppen climate classification).

== Transport ==
1st Anpilogovo is located 7.5 km from the federal route M-2 Crimea Highway (a part of the European route E105), 2 km from the road of intermunicipal significance 38H-197 (M2 "Crimea Highway" – Polyanskoye – border of the Oktyabrsky District), on the road 38H-198 (38N-197 – 2nd Anpilogovo – Bolshoye Lukino), 15 km from the nearest railway station Dyakonovo (railway line Lgov I — Kursk).

The rural locality is situated 19 km from Kursk Vostochny Airport, 130 km from Belgorod International Airport and 222 km from Voronezh Peter the Great Airport.
