= Alyabyevo, Besedinsky selsoviet, Kursky District, Kursk Oblast =

Rural locality in Kursk Oblast, Russia

Alyabyevo Алябьево
- Village
- Interactive map of Alyabyevo
- Location of Alyabyevo Alyabyevo (Kursk Oblast)
- Coordinates: 51°40′33″N 36°26′08″E
- Country: Russia
- Federal subject: Kursk Oblast
- Administrative district: Kursky District
- SelsovietSelsoviet: Besedinsky

Population (2010 Census)
  - Total: 131
  - Estimate (2010): 131 (0%)

Municipal status
  - Municipal district: Kursky Municipal District
  - Rural settlement: Besedinsky Selsoviet Rural Settlement
- Time zone: UTC+3 (MSK)
- Postal code: 305501
- Dialing code: +7 4712
- OKTMO ID: 38620408106
- Website: besedino.rkursk.ru

Alyabyevo (Russian: Алябьево) is a rural locality (Russian: деревня, lit. 'village') in Besedinsky Selsoviet Rural Settlement, Kursky District, Kursk Oblast, Russia. Population: 131 (2010 census); 158 (2002 census);

== Geography ==
The village is located on the Seym River (a left tributary of the Desna) and its tributary, Rat River, 100 km from the Russia–Ukraine border, 12 km south-east of the district center – the town Kursk, 4 km from the selsoviet center – Besedino.

Climate

Alyabyevo has a warm-summer humid continental climate (Dfb in the Köppen climate classification).

== Transport ==
Alyabyevo is located 4 km from the federal route P-298 (Kursk – Voronezh – P-22 "Kaspy" Highway; a part of the European route E38), 4 km from the road of regional importance 38K-014 (R-298 – Polevaya), on the road of intermunicipal significance 38H-259 (R-298 – Belomestnoye – Kuvshinnoye), 4 km from the nearest railway halt Zaplava (railway line Klyukva — Belgorod).

The rural locality is situated 14 km from Kursk Vostochny Airport, 114 km from Belgorod International Airport and 194 km from Voronezh Peter the Great Airport.
