= 2nd Pisklovo =

Rural locality in Kursk Oblast, Russia

2nd Pisklovo 2-е Писклово
- Village
- Interactive map of 2nd Pisklovo
- Location of 2nd Pisklovo 2nd Pisklovo (Kursk Oblast)
- Coordinates: 51°45′49″N 36°35′20″E
- Country: Russia
- Federal subject: Kursk Oblast
- Administrative district: Kursky District
- SelsovietSelsoviet: Besedinsky

Population (2010 Census)
  - Total: 14
  - Estimate (2010): 14 (0%)

Municipal status
  - Municipal district: Kursky Municipal District
  - Rural settlement: Besedinsky Selsoviet Rural Settlement
- Time zone: UTC+3 (MSK)
- Postal code: 305501
- Dialing code: +7 4712
- OKTMO ID: 38620408201
- Website: besedino.rkursk.ru

2nd Pisklovo or Vtoroye Pisklovo (Russian: 2-е Писклово, Второе Писклово) is a rural locality (Russian: деревня, lit. 'village') in Besedinsky Selsoviet Rural Settlement, Kursky District, Kursk Oblast, Russia. Population: 14 (2010 census); 27 (2002 census);

== Geography ==
The village is located on the Rat River (a right tributary of the Seym), 114 km from the Russia–Ukraine border, 22 km east of the district center – the town Kursk, 9 km from the selsoviet center – Besedino.

Climate

2nd Pisklovo has a warm-summer humid continental climate (Dfb in the Köppen climate classification).

== Transport ==
2nd Pisklovo is located 8.5 km from the federal route P-298 (Kursk – Voronezh – P-22 "Kaspy" Highway; a part of the European route E38), 2 km from the road of intermunicipal significance 38H-530 (Otreshkovo – Petrovskoye – Besedino), on the road 38H-529 (38N-530 – Troitsa – 2nd Pisklovo), 6 km from the nearest railway halt 29 km (railway line Kursk – 146 km).

The rural locality is situated 21 km from Kursk Vostochny Airport, 123 km from Belgorod International Airport and 182 km from Voronezh Peter the Great Airport.
