= Zherdevo, Kursky District, Kursk Oblast =

Rural locality in Kursk Oblast, Russia

Zherdevo Жердево
- Village
- Interactive map of Zherdevo
- Location of Zherdevo Zherdevo (Kursk Oblast)
- Coordinates: 51°47′31″N 35°55′27″E
- Country: Russia
- Federal subject: Kursk Oblast
- Administrative district: Kursky District
- SelsovietSelsoviet: Polyansky

Population (2010 Census)
  - Total: 20
  - Estimate (2010): 20 (0%)

Municipal status
  - Municipal district: Kursky Municipal District
  - Rural settlement: Polyansky Selsoviet Rural Settlement
- Time zone: UTC+3 (MSK)
- Postal code: 305521
- Dialing code: +7 4712
- OKTMO ID: 38620472121
- Website: polanskoe.rkursk.ru

Zherdevo (Russian: Жердево) is a rural locality (Russian: деревня, lit. 'village') in Polyansky Selsoviet Rural Settlement, Kursky District, Kursk Oblast, Russia. Population: 20 (2010 census); 43 (2002 census);

== Geography ==
The village is located 83 km from the Russia–Ukraine border, 19 km north-west of Kursk, 6 km from the selsoviet center – Polyanskoye.

Climate

Zherdevo has a warm-summer humid continental climate (Dfb in the Köppen climate classification).

== Transport ==
Zherdevo is located 13 km from the federal route M-2 Crimea Highway (a part of the European route E105), 2 km from the road of intermunicipal significance 38H-197 (M2 "Crimea Highway" – Polyanskoye – border of the Oktyabrsky District), 4 km from the road 38H-198 (38N-197 – 2nd Anpilogovo – Bolshoye Lukino), 16 km from the nearest railway station Dyakonovo (railway line Lgov I — Kursk).

The rural locality is situated 25 km from Kursk Vostochny Airport, 135 km from Belgorod International Airport and 228 km from Voronezh Peter the Great Airport.
