= Chuykova, Kursk Oblast =

Rural locality in Kursk Oblast, Russia

Chuykova Чуйкова
- Village
- Interactive map of Chuykova
- Location of Chuykova Chuykova (Kursk Oblast)
- Coordinates: 51°41′08″N 36°26′18″E
- Country: Russia
- Federal subject: Kursk Oblast
- Administrative district: Kursky District
- SelsovietSelsoviet: Besedinsky
- Elevation: 166 m (545 ft)

Population (2010 Census)
  - Total: 59
  - Estimate (2010): 59 (0%)

Municipal status
  - Municipal district: Kursky Municipal District
  - Rural settlement: Besedinsky Selsoviet Rural Settlement
- Time zone: UTC+3 (MSK)
- Postal code: 305501
- Dialing code: +7 4712
- OKTMO ID: 38620408171
- Website: besedino.rkursk.ru

Chuykova (Russian: Чуйкова) is a rural locality (Russian: деревня, lit. 'village') in Besedinsky Selsoviet Rural Settlement, Kursky District, Kursk Oblast, Russia. Population: 59 (2010 census); 81 (2002 census);

== Geography ==
The village is located on the Rat River (a right tributary of the Seym), 101 km from the Russia–Ukraine border, 13 km south-east of the district center – the town Kursk, 3.5 km from the selsoviet center – Besedino.

Climate

Chuykova has a warm-summer humid continental climate (Dfb in the Köppen climate classification).

== Transport ==
Chuykova is located 3.5 km from the federal route P-298 (Kursk – Voronezh – P-22 "Kaspy" Highway; a part of the European route E38), on the road of intermunicipal significance 38H-259 (R-298 – Belomestnoye – Kuvshinnoye), 5.5 km from the nearest railway halt Zaplava (railway line Klyukva — Belgorod).

The rural locality is situated 13 km from Kursk Vostochny Airport, 115 km from Belgorod International Airport and 193 km from Voronezh Peter the Great Airport.
