= Maloye Lukino =

Rural locality in Kursk Oblast, Russia

Maloye Lukino Малое Лукино
- Village
- Interactive map of Maloye Lukino
- Location of Maloye Lukino Maloye Lukino (Kursk Oblast)
- Coordinates: 51°46′26″N 35°59′18″E
- Country: Russia
- Federal subject: Kursk Oblast
- Administrative district: Kursky District
- SelsovietSelsoviet: Polyansky

Population (2010 Census)
  - Total: 28
  - Estimate (2010): 28 (0%)

Municipal status
  - Municipal district: Kursky Municipal District
  - Rural settlement: Polyansky Selsoviet Rural Settlement
- Time zone: UTC+3 (MSK)
- Postal code: 305521
- Dialing code: +7 4712
- OKTMO ID: 38620472136
- Website: polanskoe.rkursk.ru

Maloye Lukino (Russian: Малое Лукино) is a rural locality (Russian: деревня, lit. 'village') in Polyansky Selsoviet Rural Settlement, Kursky District, Kursk Oblast, Russia.

Population: 28 (2010 census); 43 (2002 census);

== Geography ==
The village is located on the Bolshaya Kuritsa River (a right tributary of the Seym River), 85 km from the Russia–Ukraine border, 14 km north-west of Kursk, 1.5 km from the selsoviet center – Polyanskoye.

Climate

Maloye Lukino has a warm-summer humid continental climate (Dfb in the Köppen climate classification).

== Transport ==
Maloye Lukino is located 8.5 km from the federal route M-2 Crimea Highway (a part of the European route E105), 2 km from the road of intermunicipal significance 38H-197 (M2 "Crimea Highway" – Polyanskoye – border of the Oktyabrsky District), on the road 38H-198 (38N-197 – 2nd Anpilogovo – Bolshoye Lukino), 14 km from the nearest railway station Dyakonovo (railway line Lgov I — Kursk).

The rural locality is situated 21 km from Kursk Vostochny Airport, 131 km from Belgorod International Airport and 223 km from Voronezh Peter the Great Airport.
