= 1st Pisklovo =

Rural locality in Kursk Oblast, Russia

1st Pisklovo 1-е Писклово
- Village
- Interactive map of 1st Pisklovo
- Location of 1st Pisklovo 1st Pisklovo (Kursk Oblast)
- Coordinates: 51°45′01″N 36°36′01″E
- Country: Russia
- Federal subject: Kursk Oblast
- Administrative district: Kursky District
- SelsovietSelsoviet: Besedinsky

Population (2010 Census)
  - Total: 118
  - Estimate (2010): 118 (0%)

Municipal status
  - Municipal district: Kursky Municipal District
  - Rural settlement: Besedinsky Selsoviet Rural Settlement
- Time zone: UTC+3 (MSK)
- Postal code: 305501
- Dialing code: +7 4712
- OKTMO ID: 38620408196
- Website: besedino.rkursk.ru

1st Pisklovo or Pervoye Pisklovo (Russian: 1-е Писклово, Первое Писклово) is a rural locality (Russian: деревня, lit. 'village') in Besedinsky Selsoviet Rural Settlement, Kursky District, Kursk Oblast, Russia. Population: 118 (2010 census); 165 (2002 census);

== Geography ==
The village is located on the Rat River (a right tributary of the Seym) and its left tributary, Lazvert River, 113 km from the Russia–Ukraine border, 21 km east of the district center – the town Kursk, 8 km from the selsoviet center – Besedino.

Climate

1st Pisklovo has a warm-summer humid continental climate (Dfb in the Köppen climate classification).

== Transport ==
1st Pisklovo is located 7 km from the federal route P-298 (Kursk – Voronezh – P-22 "Kaspy" Highway; a part of the European route E38), 2 km from the road of intermunicipal significance 38H-530 (Otreshkovo – Petrovskoye – Besedino), on the road 38H-536 (Petrovskoye – 1st Pisklovo), 7.5 km from the nearest railway halt 29 km (railway line Kursk – 146 km).

The rural locality is situated 22 km from Kursk Vostochny Airport, 122 km from Belgorod International Airport and 181 km from Voronezh Peter the Great Airport.
