= Kastorny =

Kastorny (Russian: Касторный; masculine), Kastornaya (Касторная; feminine), or Kastornoye (Касторное; neuter) is the name of several inhabited localities in Russia.

Urban localities

- Kastornoye, a work settlement in Kastorensky District of Kursk Oblast

Rural localities

- Kastornaya, a village in Mokovsky Selsoviet of Kursky District of Kursk Oblast
