= Gremyachka, Kursky District, Kursk Oblast =

Rural locality in Kursk Oblast, Russia

Gremyachka Гремячка
- Village
- Interactive map of Gremyachka
- Location of Gremyachka Gremyachka (Kursk Oblast)
- Coordinates: 51°45′20″N 36°05′11″E
- Country: Russia
- Federal subject: Kursk Oblast
- Administrative district: Kursky District
- SelsovietSelsoviet: Mokovsky
- Elevation: 197 m (646 ft)

Population (2010 Census)
  - Total: 397
  - Estimate (2010): 397 (0%)

Municipal status
  - Municipal district: Kursky Municipal District
  - Rural settlement: Mokovsky Selsoviet Rural Settlement
- Time zone: UTC+3 (MSK)
- Postal code: 305520
- Dialing code: +7 4712
- OKTMO ID: 38620436106
- Website: mokva.rkursk.ru

Gremyachka (Russian: Гремячка) is a rural locality (Russian: деревня, lit. 'village') in Mokovsky Selsoviet Rural Settlement, Kursky District, Kursk Oblast, Russia. Population: 397 (2010 census); 409 (2002 census);

== Geography ==
The village is located on the Mokva River (a right tributary of the Seym River basin), 87 km from the Russia–Ukraine border, 5 km north-west of Kursk, 3 km from the selsoviet center – 1st Mokva.

Streets

There are the following streets in the locality: Chernikov bok, Fruktovaya, Kreshchenskaya, Lugovaya, Molodyozhnaya, Molodyozhny pereulok, Pravoslavnaya, Rozhdestvenskaya, Strelkovaya, Shirokaya, Trudovaya and Uspenskaya (204 houses).

Climate

Gremyachka has a warm-summer humid continental climate (Dfb in the Köppen climate classification).

== Transport ==
Gremyachka is located 0.5 km from the federal route M-2 Crimea Highway (a part of the European route E105), on the roads of intermunicipal significance 38H-197 (M2 "Crimea Highway" – Polyanskoye – border of the Oktyabrsky District) and 38H-794 (38N-197 – Gardening Non-profit Partnership "Zolotaya osen"), 10 km from the nearest railway station Kursk (railway lines: Oryol – Kursk, Kursk – 146 km and Lgov-I – Kursk).

The rural locality is situated 14 km from Kursk Vostochny Airport, 127 km from Belgorod International Airport and 217 km from Voronezh Peter the Great Airport.
