= Kamenevo, Vinnikovsky selsoviet, Kursky District, Kursk Oblast =

Rural locality in Kursk Oblast, Russia

Kamenevo Каменево
- Village
- Interactive map of Kamenevo
- Location of Kamenevo Kamenevo (Kursk Oblast)
- Coordinates: 51°49′41″N 36°27′49″E
- Country: Russia
- Federal subject: Kursk Oblast
- Administrative district: Kursky District
- SelsovietSelsoviet: Vinnikovsky

Population (2010 Census)
  - Total: 43
  - Estimate (2010): 43 (0%)

Municipal status
  - Municipal district: Kursky Municipal District
  - Rural settlement: Vinnikovsky Selsoviet Rural Settlement
- Time zone: UTC+3 (MSK)
- Postal code: 305510
- Dialing code: +7 4712
- OKTMO ID: 38620420121
- Website: vinnikovo.rkursk.ru

Kamenevo (Russian: Каменево) is a rural locality (Russian: деревня, lit. 'village') in Vinnikovsky Selsoviet Rural Settlement, Kursky District, Kursk Oblast, Russia. Population: 43 (2010 census); 75 (2002 census);

== Geography ==
The village is located on the Vinogrobl River (a left tributary of the Tuskar in the basin of the Seym), 113 km from the Russia–Ukraine border, 15 km north-east of the district center – the town Kursk, 1.5 km from the selsoviet center – 1st Vinnikovo.

Climate

Kamenevo has a warm-summer humid continental climate (Dfb in the Köppen climate classification).

== Transport ==
Kamenevo is located 11.5 km from the federal route P-298 (Kursk – Voronezh – P-22 "Kaspy" Highway; a part of the European route E38), 4.5 km from the road of regional importance 38K-016 (Kursk – Kastornoye), 4.5 km from the nearest railway halt 18 km (railway line Kursk – 146 km).

The rural locality is situated 15 km from Kursk Vostochny Airport, 131 km from Belgorod International Airport and 190 km from Voronezh Peter the Great Airport.
