= Mayskaya Zarya =

Rural locality in Kursk Oblast, Russia

Mayskaya Zarya Майская Заря
- Village
- Interactive map of Mayskaya Zarya
- Location of Mayskaya Zarya Mayskaya Zarya (Kursk Oblast)
- Coordinates: 51°42′10″N 36°03′25″E
- Country: Russia
- Federal subject: Kursk Oblast
- Administrative district: Kursky District
- SelsovietSelsoviet: Mokovsky

Population (2010 Census)
  - Total: 54
  - Estimate (2010): 54 (0%)

Municipal status
  - Municipal district: Kursky Municipal District
  - Rural settlement: Mokovsky Selsoviet Rural Settlement
- Time zone: UTC+3 (MSK)
- Postal code: 305520
- Dialing code: +7 4712
- OKTMO ID: 38620436126
- Website: mokva.rkursk.ru

Mayskaya Zarya (Russian: Майская Заря) is a rural locality (Russian: деревня, lit. 'village') in Mokovsky Selsoviet Rural Settlement, Kursky District, Kursk Oblast, Russia. Population: 54 (2010 census); 53 (2002 census);

== Geography ==
The village is located 82.5 km from the Russia–Ukraine border, 6 km south-west of Kursk, 1.5 km from the selsoviet center – 1st Mokva.

Streets

There are the following streets in the locality: Otradnaya, Plyazhnaya, Prokhladnaya, Rassvetnaya, Rassvetny pereulok, Rodnikovaya, Tikhy pereulok, Vekovaya and Vysoky pereulok (85 houses).

Climate

Mayskaya Zarya has a warm-summer humid continental climate (Dfb in the Köppen climate classification).

== Transport ==
Mayskaya Zarya is located 0.8 km from the federal route M-2 Crimea Highway (a part of the European route E105), on the road of intermunicipal significance 38H-201 (M2 "Crimea Highway" – Dukhovets), 7.5 km from the nearest railway station Ryshkovo (railway line Lgov I — Kursk).

The rural locality is situated 16.5 km from Kursk Vostochny Airport, 122 km from Belgorod International Airport and 219 km from Voronezh Peter the Great Airport.
