= Semidesny =

Rural locality in Kursk Oblast, Russia

Semidesny Семидесный
- Khutor
- Interactive map of Semidesny
- Location of Semidesny Semidesny (Kursk Oblast)
- Coordinates: 51°48′02″N 36°32′09″E
- Country: Russia
- Federal subject: Kursk Oblast
- Administrative district: Kursky District
- SelsovietSelsoviet: Besedinsky

Population (2010 Census)
  - Total: 18
  - Estimate (2010): 18 (0%)

Municipal status
  - Municipal district: Kursky Municipal District
  - Rural settlement: Besedinsky Selsoviet Rural Settlement
- Time zone: UTC+3 (MSK)
- Postal code: 305501
- Dialing code: +7 4712
- OKTMO ID: 38620408206
- Website: besedino.rkursk.ru

Semidesny (Russian: Семидесный) is a rural locality (a khutor) in Besedinsky Selsoviet Rural Settlement, Kursky District, Kursk Oblast, Russia. Population: 18 (2010 census); 7 (2002 census); .

== Geography ==
The khutor is located 114 km from the Russia–Ukraine border, 18 km east of the district center – the town Kursk, 10 km from the selsoviet center – Besedino.

Climate

Semidesny has a warm-summer humid continental climate (Dfb in the Köppen climate classification).

== Transport ==
Semidesny is located 10.5 km from the federal route P-298 (Kursk – Voronezh – P-22 "Kaspy" Highway; a part of the European route E38), 0.2 km from the road of regional importance 38K-016 (Kursk – Kastornoye), on the road of intermunicipal significance 38H-339 (38K-016 – Semidesny), 2.5 km from the nearest railway station Otreshkovo (railway line Kursk – 146 km).

The rural locality is situated 18 km from Kursk Vostochny Airport, 127 km from Belgorod International Airport and 186 km from Voronezh Peter the Great Airport.
