= Khardikovo, Kursk Oblast =

Rural locality in Kursk Oblast, Russia

Khardikovo Хардиково
- Selo
- Interactive map of Khardikovo
- Location of Khardikovo Khardikovo (Kursk Oblast)
- Coordinates: 51°42′59″N 35°57′43″E
- Country: Russia
- Federal subject: Kursk Oblast
- Administrative district: Kursky District
- SelsovietSelsoviet: Polyansky

Population (2010 Census)
  - Total: 66
  - Estimate (2010): 66 (0%)

Municipal status
  - Municipal district: Kursky Municipal District
  - Rural settlement: Polyansky Selsoviet Rural Settlement
- Time zone: UTC+3 (MSK)
- Postal code: 305521
- Dialing code: +7 4712
- OKTMO ID: 38620472161
- Website: polanskoe.rkursk.ru

Khardikovo (Russian: Хардиково) is a rural locality (Russian: село, lit. 'village') in Polyansky Selsoviet Rural Settlement, Kursky District, Kursk Oblast, Russia. Population: 66 (2010 census); 82 (2002 census);

== Geography ==
The village is located on the Bolshaya Kuritsa River (a right tributary of the Seym River), 79 km from the Russia–Ukraine border, 15 km west of Kursk, 4.5 km from the selsoviet center – Polyanskoye.

Climate

Khardikovo has a warm-summer humid continental climate (Dfb in the Köppen climate classification).

== Transport ==
Khardikovo is located 7.5 km from the federal route M-2 Crimea Highway (a part of the European route E105), 4.5 km from the road of intermunicipal significance 38H-197 (M2 "Crimea Highway" – Polyanskoye – border of the Oktyabrsky District), on the road 38H-199 (38N-197 – Pimenovo), 7.5 km from the nearest railway station Dyakonovo (railway line Lgov I — Kursk).

The rural locality is situated 22.5 km from Kursk Vostochny Airport, 126 km from Belgorod International Airport and 226 km from Voronezh Peter the Great Airport.
