= Karasevka, Kursky District, Kursk Oblast =

Rural locality in Kursk Oblast, Russia

Karasevka Карасевка
- Village
- Interactive map of Karasevka
- Location of Karasevka Karasevka (Kursk Oblast)
- Coordinates: 51°42′49″N 36°31′10″E
- Country: Russia
- Federal subject: Kursk Oblast
- Administrative district: Kursky District
- SelsovietSelsoviet: Besedinsky
- Elevation: 169 m (554 ft)

Population (2010 Census)
  - Total: 202
  - Estimate (2010): 202 (0%)

Municipal status
  - Municipal district: Kursky Municipal District
  - Rural settlement: Besedinsky Selsoviet Rural Settlement
- Time zone: UTC+3 (MSK)
- Postal code: 305501
- Dialing code: +7 4712
- OKTMO ID: 38620408141
- Website: besedino.rkursk.ru

Karasevka (Russian: Карасевка) is a rural locality (Russian: деревня, lit. 'village') in Besedinsky Selsoviet Rural Settlement, Kursky District, Kursk Oblast, Russia. Population: 202 (2010 census); 243 (2002 census);

== Geography ==
The village is located on the Rat River (a right tributary of the Seym), 107 km from the Russia–Ukraine border, 17 km east of the district center – the town Kursk, 2 km from the selsoviet center – Besedino.

Climate

Karasevka has a warm-summer humid continental climate (Dfb in the Köppen climate classification).

== Transport ==
Karasevka is located 1.5 km from the federal route P-298 (Kursk – Voronezh – P-22 "Kaspy" Highway; a part of the European route E38), on the roads of intermunicipal significance 38H-530 (Otreshkovo – Petrovskoye – Besedino) and 38H-814 (38N-530 – Karasevka), 8.5 km from the nearest railway station Otreshkovo (railway line Kursk – 146 km).

The rural locality is situated 17 km from Kursk Vostochny Airport, 118 km from Belgorod International Airport and 187 km from Voronezh Peter the Great Airport.
