= Bukreyevskiye Vyselki =

Rural locality in Kursk Oblast, Russia

Bukreyevskiye Vyselki Букреевские Выселки
- Khutor
- Interactive map of Bukreyevskiye Vyselki
- Location of Bukreyevskiye Vyselki Bukreyevskiye Vyselki (Kursk Oblast)
- Coordinates: 51°40′36″N 36°35′53″E
- Country: Russia
- Federal subject: Kursk Oblast
- Administrative district: Kursky District
- SelsovietSelsoviet: Besedinsky

Population (2010 Census)
  - Total: 5
  - Estimate (2010): 5 (0%)

Municipal status
  - Municipal district: Kursky Municipal District
  - Rural settlement: Besedinsky Selsoviet Rural Settlement
- Time zone: UTC+3 (MSK)
- Postal code: 305501
- Dialing code: +7 4712
- OKTMO ID: 38620408121
- Website: besedino.rkursk.ru

Bukreyevskiye Vyselki (Russian: Букреевские Выселки) is a rural locality (a khutor) in Besedinsky Selsoviet Rural Settlement, Kursky District, Kursk Oblast, Russia. Population: 5 (2010 census); 12 (2002 census);

== Geography ==
The khutor is located 109 km from the Russia–Ukraine border, 24 km south-east of the district center – the town Kursk, 8 km from the selsoviet center – Besedino.

Climate

Bukreyevskiye Vyselki has a warm-summer humid continental climate (Dfb in the Köppen climate classification).

== Transport ==
Bukreyevskiye Vyselki is located on the federal route P-298 (Kursk – Voronezh – P-22 "Kaspy" Highway; a part of the European route E38), 10 km from the nearest railway station Polevaya (railway line Klyukva — Belgorod).

The rural locality is situated 24 km from Kursk Vostochny Airport, 114 km from Belgorod International Airport and 182 km from Voronezh Peter the Great Airport.
