= Zubkov, Kursk Oblast =

Rural locality in Kursk Oblast, Russia

Zubkov Зубков
- Khutor
- Interactive map of Zubkov
- Location of Zubkov Zubkov (Kursk Oblast)
- Coordinates: 51°42′00″N 36°05′57″E
- Country: Russia
- Federal subject: Kursk Oblast
- Administrative district: Kursky District
- SelsovietSelsoviet: Mokovsky

Population (2010 Census)
  - Total: 315
  - Estimate (2010): 315 (0%)

Municipal status
  - Municipal district: Kursky Municipal District
  - Rural settlement: Mokovsky Selsoviet Rural Settlement
- Time zone: UTC+3 (MSK)
- Postal code: 305520
- Dialing code: +7 4712
- OKTMO ID: 38620436116
- Website: mokva.rkursk.ru

Zubkov (Russian: Зубков) is a rural locality (a khutor) in Mokovsky Selsoviet Rural Settlement, Kursky District, Kursk Oblast, Russia. Population: 315 (2010 census); 296 (2002 census);

== Geography ==
The khutor is located on the Mokva River (a right tributary of the Seym River basin), 85 km from the Russia–Ukraine border, 2 km south-west of Kursk, 1 km from the selsoviet center – 1st Mokva.

Climate

Zubkov has a warm-summer humid continental climate (Dfb in the Köppen climate classification).

== Transport ==
Zubkov is located 2 km from the federal route M-2 Crimea Highway (a part of the European route E105), 5.5 km from the nearest railway station Ryshkovo (railway line Lgov I — Kursk).

The rural locality is situated 14 km from Kursk Vostochny Airport, 121 km from Belgorod International Airport and 216 km from Voronezh Peter the Great Airport.
