= Roykovo =

Rural locality in Kursk Oblast, Russia

Roykovo Ройково
- Village
- Interactive map of Roykovo
- Location of Roykovo Roykovo (Kursk Oblast)
- Coordinates: 51°39′23″N 35°59′55″E
- Country: Russia
- Federal subject: Kursk Oblast
- Administrative district: Oktyabrsky District
- SelsovietSelsoviet: Chernitsynsky

Population (2010 Census)
  - Total: 335
  - Estimate (2010): 335 (0%)

Municipal status
  - Municipal district: Oktyabrsky Municipal District
  - Rural settlement: Chernitsynsky Selsoviet Rural Settlement
- Time zone: UTC+3 (MSK)
- Postal code: 307207
- Dialing code: +7 47142
- OKTMO ID: 38628436126
- Website: chernicino.ru

Roykovo (Russian: Ройково) is a rural locality (Russian: деревня, lit. 'village') in Chernitsynsky Selsoviet Rural Settlement, Oktyabrsky District, Kursk Oblast, Russia. Population: 335 (2010 census); 334 (2002 census);

== Geography ==
The village is located on the Seym River (a left tributary of the Desna), 76 km from the Russia–Ukraine border, 11 km south-west of Kursk, 2 km east of the district center – the urban-type settlement Pryamitsyno, at the еаstern border of the selsoviet center – Chernitsyno.

Streets

There are the following streets in the locality: Blagodatnaya, Davydova, Dorokhova, Makarova, Neverovskogo, Platova, Rayevskogo, Rumyantseva, Samsonova, Seslavina, Skobeleva, Uvarova and Yermolova (140 houses).

Climate

Roykovo has a warm-summer humid continental climate (Dfb in the Köppen climate classification).

== Transport ==
Roykovo is located 3 km from the federal route M-2 Crimea Highway (a part of the European route E105), on the road of regional importance 38K-017 (Kursk – Lgov – Rylsk – border with Ukraine), 2 km from the road of intermunicipal significance 38H-201 (M2 "Crimea Highway" – Dukhovets), 3 km from the nearest railway station Dyakonovo (railway line Lgov I — Kursk).

The rural locality is situated 22 km from Kursk Vostochny Airport, 118 km from Belgorod International Airport and 223 km from Voronezh Peter the Great Airport.
