= Zhilyayevo, Kursk Oblast =

Rural locality in Kursk Oblast, Russia

Zhilyayevo Жиляево
- Village
- Interactive map of Zhilyayevo
- Location of Zhilyayevo Zhilyayevo (Kursk Oblast)
- Coordinates: 51°44′43″N 35°57′34″E
- Country: Russia
- Federal subject: Kursk Oblast
- Administrative district: Kursky District
- SelsovietSelsoviet: Polyansky

Population (2010 Census)
  - Total: 46
  - Estimate (2010): 46 (0%)

Municipal status
  - Municipal district: Kursky Municipal District
  - Rural settlement: Polyansky Selsoviet Rural Settlement
- Time zone: UTC+3 (MSK)
- Postal code: 305521
- Dialing code: +7 4712
- OKTMO ID: 38620472131
- Website: polanskoe.rkursk.ru

Zhilyayevo (Russian: Жиляево) is a rural locality (Russian: деревня, lit. 'village') in Polyansky Selsoviet Rural Settlement, Kursky District, Kursk Oblast, Russia. Population: 46 (2010 census); 61 (2002 census);

== Geography ==
The village is located on the Bolshaya Kuritsa River (a right tributary of the Seym River), 81 km from the Russia–Ukraine border, 15 km west of Kursk, 2 km from the selsoviet center – Polyanskoye.

Climate

Zhilyayevo has a warm-summer humid continental climate (Dfb in the Köppen climate classification).

== Transport ==
Zhilyayevo is located 9 km from the federal route M-2 Crimea Highway (a part of the European route E105), 1 km from the road of intermunicipal significance 38H-197 (M2 "Crimea Highway" – Polyanskoye – border of the Oktyabrsky District), 11 km from the nearest railway station Dyakonovo (railway line Lgov I — Kursk).

The rural locality is situated 22 km from Kursk Vostochny Airport, 128 km from Belgorod International Airport and 225 km from Voronezh Peter the Great Airport.
