= Bolshoye Maltsevo =

Rural locality in Kursk Oblast, Russia

Bolshoye Maltsevo Большое Мальцево
- Village
- Interactive map of Bolshoye Maltsevo
- Location of Bolshoye Maltsevo Bolshoye Maltsevo (Kursk Oblast)
- Coordinates: 51°43′51″N 36°32′27″E
- Country: Russia
- Federal subject: Kursk Oblast
- Administrative district: Kursky District
- SelsovietSelsoviet: Besedinsky

Population (2010 Census)
  - Total: 65
  - Estimate (2010): 65 (0%)

Municipal status
  - Municipal district: Kursky Municipal District
  - Rural settlement: Besedinsky Selsoviet Rural Settlement
- Time zone: UTC+3 (MSK)
- Postal code: 305501
- Dialing code: +7 4712
- OKTMO ID: 38620408191
- Website: besedino.rkursk.ru

Bolshoye Maltsevo (Russian: Большое Мальцево) is a rural locality (Russian: деревня, lit. 'village') in Besedinsky Selsoviet Rural Settlement, Kursky District, Kursk Oblast, Russia. Population: 65 (2010 census); 90 (2002 census);

== Geography ==
The village is located on the Rat River (a right tributary of the Seym), 109 km from the Russia–Ukraine border, 18 km east of the district center – the town Kursk, 4.5 km from the selsoviet center – Besedino.

Climate

Bolshoye Maltsevo has a warm-summer humid continental climate (Dfb in the Köppen climate classification).

== Transport ==
Bolshoye Maltsevo is located 4 km from the federal route P-298 (Kursk – Voronezh – P-22 "Kaspy" Highway; a part of the European route E38), on the road of intermunicipal significance 38H-537 (Petrovskoye – Bolshoye Maltsevo), 7 km from the nearest railway station Otreshkovo (railway line Kursk – 146 km).

The rural locality is situated 18 km from Kursk Vostochny Airport, 120 km from Belgorod International Airport and 185 km from Voronezh Peter the Great Airport.
