= Nartovo, Kursk Oblast =

Rural locality in Kursk Oblast, Russia

Nartovo Нартово
- Village
- Interactive map of Nartovo
- Location of Nartovo Nartovo (Kursk Oblast)
- Coordinates: 51°45′26″N 35°57′57″E
- Country: Russia
- Federal subject: Kursk Oblast
- Administrative district: Kursky District
- SelsovietSelsoviet: Polyansky

Population (2010 Census)
  - Total: 19
  - Estimate (2010): 19 (0%)

Municipal status
  - Municipal district: Kursky Municipal District
  - Rural settlement: Polyansky Selsoviet Rural Settlement
- Time zone: UTC+3 (MSK)
- Postal code: 305521
- Dialing code: +7 4712
- OKTMO ID: 38620472141
- Website: polanskoe.rkursk.ru

Nartovo (Russian: Нартово) is a rural locality (Russian: деревня, lit. 'village') in Polyansky Selsoviet Rural Settlement, Kursky District, Kursk Oblast, Russia. Population: 19 (2010 census); 24 (2002 census);

== Geography ==
The village is located on the Bolshaya Kuritsa River (a right tributary of the Seym River), 82 km from the Russia–Ukraine border, 14.5 km north-west of Kursk, 1.5 km from the selsoviet center – Polyanskoye.

Climate

Nartovo has a warm-summer humid continental climate (Dfb in the Köppen climate classification).

== Transport ==
Nartovo is located 9 km from the federal route M-2 Crimea Highway (a part of the European route E105), on the road of intermunicipal significance 38H-197 (M2 "Crimea Highway" – Polyanskoye – border of the Oktyabrsky District), 12 km from the nearest railway station Dyakonovo (railway line Lgov I — Kursk).

The rural locality is situated 22 km from Kursk Vostochny Airport, 129 km from Belgorod International Airport and 225 km from Voronezh Peter the Great Airport.
