= Kastornaya =

Rural locality in Kursk Oblast, Russia

Kastornaya Касторная
- Village
- Interactive map of Kastornaya
- Location of Kastornaya Kastornaya (Kursk Oblast)
- Coordinates: 51°43′19″N 36°02′35″E
- Country: Russia
- Federal subject: Kursk Oblast
- Administrative district: Kursky District
- SelsovietSelsoviet: Mokovsky

Population (2010 Census)
  - Total: 58
  - Estimate (2010): 58 (0%)

Municipal status
  - Municipal district: Kursky Municipal District
  - Rural settlement: Mokovsky Selsoviet Rural Settlement
- Time zone: UTC+3 (MSK)
- Postal code: 305520
- Dialing code: +7 4712
- OKTMO ID: 38620436121
- Website: mokva.rkursk.ru

Kastornaya (Russian: Касторная) is a rural locality (Russian: деревня, lit. 'village') in Mokovsky Selsoviet Rural Settlement, Kursky District, Kursk Oblast, Russia. Population: 58 (2010 census); 48 (2002 census);

== Geography ==
The village is located 83.5 km from the Russia–Ukraine border, 9 km west of Kursk, at the western border of the selsoviet center – 1st Mokva.

Streets

There are the following streets in the locality: Dachnaya, Medovaya, Pokrovskaya, Sirenevaya, Spasskaya and Zemlyanichnaya (128 houses).

Climate

Kastornaya has a warm-summer humid continental climate (Dfb in the Köppen climate classification).

== Transport ==
Kastornaya is located 2.5 km from the federal route M-2 Crimea Highway (a part of the European route E105), 10 km from the nearest railway station Ryshkovo (railway line Lgov I — Kursk).

The rural locality is situated 17 km from Kursk Vostochny Airport, 124 km from Belgorod International Airport and 220 km from Voronezh Peter the Great Airport.
