= Vodyanoye, Kursk Oblast =

Rural locality in Kursk Oblast, Russia

Vodyanoye Водяное
- Village
- Interactive map of Vodyanoye
- Location of Vodyanoye Vodyanoye (Kursk Oblast)
- Coordinates: 51°50′36″N 36°32′10″E
- Country: Russia
- Federal subject: Kursk Oblast
- Administrative district: Kursky District
- SelsovietSelsoviet: Vinnikovsky

Population (2010 Census)
  - Total: 64
  - Estimate (2010): 64 (0%)

Municipal status
  - Municipal district: Kursky Municipal District
  - Rural settlement: Vinnikovsky Selsoviet Rural Settlement
- Time zone: UTC+3 (MSK)
- Postal code: 305510
- Dialing code: +7 4712
- OKTMO ID: 38620420116
- Website: vinnikovo.rkursk.ru

Vodyanoye (Russian: Водяное) is a rural locality (Russian: деревня, lit. 'village') in Vinnikovsky Selsoviet Rural Settlement, Kursky District, Kursk Oblast, Russia. Population: 64 (2010 census); 72 (2002 census);

== Geography ==
The village is located 118 km from the Russia–Ukraine border, 21 km north-east of the district center – the town Kursk, 4 km from the selsoviet center – 1st Vinnikovo.

Climate

Vodyanoye has a warm-summer humid continental climate (Dfb in the Köppen climate classification).

== Transport ==
Vodyanoye is located 15 km from the federal route P-298 (Kursk – Voronezh – P-22 "Kaspy" Highway; a part of the European route E38), 3.5 km from the road of regional importance 38K-016 (Kursk – Kastornoye), on the road of intermunicipal significance 38H-041 (1st Vinnikovo – Vodyanoye), 4 km from the nearest railway halt 29 km (railway line Kursk – 146 km).

The rural locality is situated 20 km from Kursk Vostochny Airport, 132 km from Belgorod International Airport and 185 km from Voronezh Peter the Great Airport.
