= Dukhovets, Mokovsky selsoviet, Kursky District, Kursk Oblast =

Rural locality in Kursk Oblast, Russia

Dukhovets Духовец
- Village
- Interactive map of Dukhovets
- Location of Dukhovets Dukhovets (Kursk Oblast)
- Coordinates: 51°41′37″N 36°02′04″E
- Country: Russia
- Federal subject: Kursk Oblast
- Administrative district: Kursky District
- SelsovietSelsoviet: Mokovsky

Population (2010 Census)
  - Total: 239
  - Estimate (2010): 239 (0%)

Municipal status
  - Municipal district: Kursky Municipal District
  - Rural settlement: Mokovsky Selsoviet Rural Settlement
- Time zone: UTC+3 (MSK)
- Postal code: 305520
- Dialing code: +7 4712
- OKTMO ID: 38620436111
- Website: mokva.rkursk.ru

Dukhovets (Russian: Духовец) is a rural locality (Russian: деревня, lit. 'village') in Mokovsky Selsoviet Rural Settlement, Kursky District, Kursk Oblast, Russia. Population: 239 (2010 census); 179 (2002 census);

== Geography ==
The village is located on the Seym River (a left tributary of the Desna), 81 km from the Russia–Ukraine border, 9 km south-west of Kursk, 4 km from the selsoviet center – 1st Mokva.

Streets

There are the following streets in the locality: Andreyevskaya, Aprelskaya, Beryozovaya, Chaynaya, Dobraya, Dorozhnaya, Druzey, Dukhovetskaya, Georgiyevskaya, Ilyinskaya, Izumrudnaya, Kofeynaya, Krasivaya, Lenskaya, Letnyaya, Maly pereulok, Mariinskaya, Naberezhnaya, Nadezhdy, Nikolskaya, Ozernaya, Pobedy, Polevaya, Polyanskaya, Prostorny pereulok, Roz, Semeynaya, Skazochnaya, Sportivnaya, Tomskaya, Tsvetochnaya, Tsvetochny pereulok, Uspeshnaya, Yaroslavskaya and Yuzhnaya (748 houses).

Climate

Dukhovets has a warm-summer humid continental climate (Dfb in the Köppen climate classification).

== Transport ==
Dukhovets is located 2 km from the federal route M-2 Crimea Highway (a part of the European route E105), on the road of intermunicipal significance 38H-201 (M2 "Crimea Highway" – Dukhovets), 6 km from the nearest railway station Dyakonovo (railway line Lgov I — Kursk).

The rural locality is situated 19 km from Kursk Vostochny Airport, 121 km from Belgorod International Airport and 221 km from Voronezh Peter the Great Airport.
