= Malinovy, Kursk Oblast =

Rural locality in Kursk Oblast, Russia

Malinovy Малиновый
- Settlement
- Interactive map of Malinovy
- Location of Malinovy Malinovy (Kursk Oblast)
- Coordinates: 51°47′59″N 36°26′16″E
- Country: Russia
- Federal subject: Kursk Oblast
- Administrative district: Kursky District
- SelsovietSelsoviet: Vinnikovsky

Population (2010 Census)
  - Total: 263
  - Estimate (2010): 263 (0%)

Municipal status
  - Municipal district: Kursky Municipal District
  - Rural settlement: Vinnikovsky Selsoviet Rural Settlement
- Time zone: UTC+3 (MSK)
- Postal code: 305531
- Dialing code: +7 4712
- OKTMO ID: 38620420131
- Website: vinnikovo.rkursk.ru

Malinovy (Russian: Малиновый) is a rural locality (a settlement) in Vinnikovsky Selsoviet Rural Settlement, Kursky District, Kursk Oblast, Russia. Population: 263 (2010 census); 282 (2002 census);

== Geography ==
The settlement is located 110 km from the Russia–Ukraine border, 13 km north-east of the district center – the town Kursk, 2.5 km from the selsoviet center – 1st Vinnikovo.

Climate

Malinovy has a warm-summer humid continental climate (Dfb in the Köppen climate classification).

== Transport ==
Malinovy is located 8 km from the federal route P-298 (Kursk – Voronezh – P-22 "Kaspy" Highway; a part of the European route E38), 1 km from the road of regional importance 38K-016 (Kursk – Kastornoye), on the road of intermunicipal significance 38H-317 (38K-016 – 1st Vinnikovo – Lipovets, with the access road to Malinovy), 0.7 km from the nearest railway halt 18 km (railway line Kursk – 146 km).

The rural locality is situated 12 km from Kursk Vostochny Airport, 127 km from Belgorod International Airport and 192 km from Voronezh Peter the Great Airport.
