= Lipovets, Kursk Oblast =

Rural locality in Kursk Oblast, Russia

Lipovets Липовец
- Settlement
- Interactive map of Lipovets
- Location of Lipovets Lipovets (Kursk Oblast)
- Coordinates: 51°47′58″N 36°27′15″E
- Country: Russia
- Federal subject: Kursk Oblast
- Administrative district: Kursky District
- SelsovietSelsoviet: Vinnikovsky

Population (2010 Census)
  - Total: 177
  - Estimate (2010): 177 (0%)

Municipal status
  - Municipal district: Kursky Municipal District
  - Rural settlement: Vinnikovsky Selsoviet Rural Settlement
- Time zone: UTC+3 (MSK)
- Postal code: 305531
- Dialing code: +7 4712
- OKTMO ID: 38620420126
- Website: vinnikovo.rkursk.ru

Lipovets (Russian: Липовец) is a rural locality (a settlement) in Vinnikovsky Selsoviet Rural Settlement, Kursky District, Kursk Oblast, Russia. Population: 177 (2010 census); 186 (2002 census);

== Geography ==
The settlement is located 111 km from the Russia–Ukraine border, 14 km north-east of the district center – the town Kursk, 2 km from the selsoviet center – 1st Vinnikovo.

Climate

Lipovets has a warm-summer humid continental climate (Dfb in the Köppen climate classification).

== Transport ==
Lipovets is located 8.5 km from the federal route P-298 (Kursk – Voronezh – P-22 "Kaspy" Highway; a part of the European route E38), 1.5 km from the road of regional importance 38K-016 (Kursk – Kastornoye), on the road of intermunicipal significance 38H-317 (38K-016 – 1st Vinnikovo – Lipovets, with the access road to Malinovy), 1.5 km from the nearest railway halt 18 km (railway line Kursk – 146 km).

The rural locality is situated 13 km from Kursk Vostochny Airport, 127 km from Belgorod International Airport and 191 km from Voronezh Peter the Great Airport.
