= 2nd Anpilogovo =

Rural locality in Kursk Oblast, Russia

2nd Anpilogovo 2-е Анпилогово
- Village
- Interactive map of 2nd Anpilogovo
- Location of 2nd Anpilogovo 2nd Anpilogovo (Kursk Oblast)
- Coordinates: 51°47′29″N 36°00′31″E
- Country: Russia
- Federal subject: Kursk Oblast
- Administrative district: Kursky District
- SelsovietSelsoviet: Polyansky

Population (2010 Census)
  - Total: 142
  - Estimate (2010): 142 (0%)

Municipal status
  - Municipal district: Kursky Municipal District
  - Rural settlement: Polyansky Selsoviet Rural Settlement
- Time zone: UTC+3 (MSK)
- Postal code: 305521
- Dialing code: +7 4712
- OKTMO ID: 38620472111
- Website: polanskoe.rkursk.ru

2nd Anpilogovo or Vtoroye Anpilogovo (Russian: 2-е Анпилогово, Второе Анпилогово) is a rural locality (Russian: деревня, lit. 'village') in Polyansky Selsoviet Rural Settlement, Kursky District, Kursk Oblast, Russia. Population: 142 (2010 census); 190 (2002 census);

== Geography ==
The village is located on the Bolshaya Kuritsa River (a right tributary of the Seym River), 87 km from the Russia–Ukraine border, 13.5 km north-west of Kursk, 3.5 km from the selsoviet center – Polyanskoye.

Climate

2nd Anpilogovo has a warm-summer humid continental climate (Dfb in the Köppen climate classification).

== Transport ==
2nd Anpilogovo is located 7.5 km from the federal route M-2 Crimea Highway (a part of the European route E105), 4 km from the road of intermunicipal significance 38H-197 (M2 "Crimea Highway" – Polyanskoye – border of the Oktyabrsky District), on the road 38H-198 (38N-197 – 2nd Anpilogovo – Bolshoye Lukino), 16 km from the nearest railway station Kursk (railway lines: Oryol – Kursk, Kursk – 146 km and Lgov-I – Kursk).

The rural locality is situated 19 km from Kursk Vostochny Airport, 133 km from Belgorod International Airport and 222 km from Voronezh Peter the Great Airport.
