= Bolshoye Lukino =

Rural locality in Kursk Oblast, Russia

Bolshoye Lukino Большое Лукино
- Village
- Interactive map of Bolshoye Lukino
- Location of Bolshoye Lukino Bolshoye Lukino (Kursk Oblast)
- Coordinates: 51°47′10″N 35°58′55″E
- Country: Russia
- Federal subject: Kursk Oblast
- Administrative district: Kursky District
- SelsovietSelsoviet: Polyansky

Population (2010 Census)
  - Total: 77
  - Estimate (2010): 77 (0%)

Municipal status
  - Municipal district: Kursky Municipal District
  - Rural settlement: Polyansky Selsoviet Rural Settlement
- Time zone: UTC+3 (MSK)
- Postal code: 305521
- Dialing code: +7 4712
- OKTMO ID: 38620472116
- Website: polanskoe.rkursk.ru

Bolshoye Lukino (Russian: Большое Лукино) is a rural locality (Russian: деревня, lit. 'village') in Polyansky Selsoviet Rural Settlement, Kursky District, Kursk Oblast, Russia. Population: 77 (2010 census); 109 (2002 census);

== Geography ==
The village is located on the Bolshaya Kuritsa River (a right tributary of the Seym River), 86 km from the Russia–Ukraine border, 15 km north-west of Kursk, 3.5 km from the selsoviet center – Polyanskoye.

Climate

Bolshoye Lukino has a warm-summer humid continental climate (Dfb in the Köppen climate classification).

== Transport ==
Bolshoye Lukino is located 9 km from the federal route M-2 Crimea Highway (a part of the European route E105), 3 km from the road of intermunicipal significance 38H-197 (M2 "Crimea Highway" – Polyanskoye – border of the Oktyabrsky District), on the road 38H-198 (38N-197 – 2nd Anpilogovo – Bolshoye Lukino), 15.5 km from the nearest railway station Dyakonovo (railway line Lgov I — Kursk).

The rural locality is situated 21 km from Kursk Vostochny Airport, 133 km from Belgorod International Airport and 224 km from Voronezh Peter the Great Airport.
