= 1st Vinnikovo =

Rural locality in Kursk Oblast, Russia

1st Vinnikovo 1-е Винниково
- Selo
- Interactive map of 1st Vinnikovo
- Location of 1st Vinnikovo 1st Vinnikovo (Kursk Oblast)
- Coordinates: 51°48′58″N 36°28′40″E
- Country: Russia
- Federal subject: Kursk Oblast
- Administrative district: Kursky District
- SelsovietSelsoviet: Vinnikovsky
- Elevation: 196 m (643 ft)

Population (2010 Census)
  - Total: 223
  - Estimate (2010): 223 (0%)

Administrative status
  - Capital of: Vinnikovsky Selsoviet

Municipal status
  - Municipal district: Kursky Municipal District
  - Rural settlement: Vinnikovsky Selsoviet Rural Settlement
  - Capital of: Vinnikovsky Selsoviet Rural Settlement
- Time zone: UTC+3 (MSK)
- Postal code: 305510
- Dialing code: +7 4712
- OKTMO ID: 38620420101
- Website: vinnikovo.rkursk.ru

1st Vinnikovo or Pervoye Vinnikovo (Russian: 1-е Винниково, Первое Винниково) is a rural locality (Russian: село, lit. 'village') and the administrative center of Vinnikovsky Selsoviet Rural Settlement, Kursky District, Kursk Oblast, Russia. Population: 223 (2010 census); 237 (2002 census);

== Geography ==
The village is located on the Vinogrobl River (a left tributary of the Tuskar in the basin of the Seym), 113 km from the Russia–Ukraine border, 14 km north-east of Kursk.

Climate

1st Vinnikovo has a warm-summer humid continental climate (Dfb in the Köppen climate classification).

Climate data for 1st Vinnikovo
Month	Jan	Feb	Mar	Apr	May	Jun	Jul	Aug	Sep	Oct	Nov	Dec	Year
Mean daily maximum °C (°F)	−4.4 (24.1)	−3.5 (25.7)	2.4 (36.3)	12.8 (55.0)	19.2 (66.6)	22.5 (72.5)	25.2 (77.4)	24.5 (76.1)	18 (64)	10.4 (50.7)	3.1 (37.6)	−1.4 (29.5)	10.7 (51.3)
Daily mean °C (°F)	−6.5 (20.3)	−6 (21)	−1.2 (29.8)	7.9 (46.2)	14.5 (58.1)	18.2 (64.8)	20.8 (69.4)	19.9 (67.8)	13.8 (56.8)	7 (45)	0.9 (33.6)	−3.4 (25.9)	7.2 (44.9)
Mean daily minimum °C (°F)	−9 (16)	−9.1 (15.6)	−5.3 (22.5)	2.3 (36.1)	8.8 (47.8)	12.7 (54.9)	15.6 (60.1)	14.7 (58.5)	9.5 (49.1)	3.7 (38.7)	−1.5 (29.3)	−5.6 (21.9)	3.1 (37.5)
Average precipitation mm (inches)	51 (2.0)	44 (1.7)	46 (1.8)	50 (2.0)	60 (2.4)	69 (2.7)	72 (2.8)	55 (2.2)	60 (2.4)	59 (2.3)	46 (1.8)	49 (1.9)	661 (26)
Source: https://en.climate-data.org/asia/russian-federation/kursk-oblast/1-е-винниково-656075/

== Transport ==
1st Vinnikovo is located 10.5 km from the federal route P-298 (Kursk – Voronezh – P-22 "Kaspy" Highway; a part of the European route E38), 3 km from the road of regional importance 38K-016 (Kursk – Kastornoye), on the roads of intermunicipal significance 38H-317 (38K-016 – 1st Vinnikovo – Lipovets, with the access road to Malinovy) and 38H-041 (1st Vinnikovo – Vodyanoye), 3.5 km from the nearest railway station Otreshkovo (railway line Kursk – 146 km).

The rural locality is situated 14 km from Kursk Vostochny Airport, 128 km from Belgorod International Airport and 189 km from Voronezh Peter the Great Airport.
