= Pimenovo, Kursk Oblast =

Rural locality in Kursk Oblast, Russia

Pimenovo Пименово
- Village
- Interactive map of Pimenovo
- Location of Pimenovo Pimenovo (Kursk Oblast)
- Coordinates: 51°42′18″N 35°57′28″E
- Country: Russia
- Federal subject: Kursk Oblast
- Administrative district: Kursky District
- SelsovietSelsoviet: Polyansky

Population (2010 Census)
  - Total: 80
  - Estimate (2010): 80 (0%)

Municipal status
  - Municipal district: Kursky Municipal District
  - Rural settlement: Polyansky Selsoviet Rural Settlement
- Time zone: UTC+3 (MSK)
- Postal code: 305521
- Dialing code: +7 4712
- OKTMO ID: 38620472146
- Website: polanskoe.rkursk.ru

Pimenovo (Russian: Пименово) is a rural locality (Russian: деревня, lit. 'village') in Polyansky Selsoviet Rural Settlement, Kursky District, Kursk Oblast, Russia. Population: 80 (2010 census); 113 (2002 census);

== Geography ==
The village is located 1 km west from the Bolshaya Kuritsa River (a right tributary of the Seym River), 78 km from the Russia–Ukraine border, 15 km west of Kursk, 5.5 km from the selsoviet center – Polyanskoye.

Climate

Pimenovo has a warm-summer humid continental climate (Dfb in the Köppen climate classification).

== Transport ==
Pimenovo is located 7.5 km from the federal route M-2 Crimea Highway (a part of the European route E105), 5.5 km from the road of intermunicipal significance 38H-197 (M2 "Crimea Highway" – Polyanskoye – border of the Oktyabrsky District), on the road 38H-199 (38N-197 – Pimenovo), 6.5 km from the nearest railway station Dyakonovo (railway line Lgov I — Kursk).

The rural locality is situated 23 km from Kursk Vostochny Airport, 124 km from Belgorod International Airport and 226 km from Voronezh Peter the Great Airport.
