= Petrovskoye, Kursky District, Kursk Oblast =

Rural locality in Kursk Oblast, Russia

Petrovskoye Петровское
- Village
- Interactive map of Petrovskoye
- Location of Petrovskoye Petrovskoye (Kursk Oblast)
- Coordinates: 51°44′09″N 36°33′32″E
- Country: Russia
- Federal subject: Kursk Oblast
- Administrative district: Kursky District
- SelsovietSelsoviet: Besedinsky

Population (2010 Census)
  - Total: 179
  - Estimate (2010): 179 (0%)

Municipal status
  - Municipal district: Kursky Municipal District
  - Rural settlement: Besedinsky Selsoviet Rural Settlement
- Time zone: UTC+3 (MSK)
- Postal code: 305501
- Dialing code: +7 4712
- OKTMO ID: 38620408181
- Website: besedino.rkursk.ru

Petrovskoye (Russian: Петровское) is a rural locality (Russian: деревня, lit. 'village') in Besedinsky Selsoviet Rural Settlement, Kursky District, Kursk Oblast, Russia. Population: 179 (2010 census); 252 (2002 census);

== Geography ==
The village is located on the Rat River (a right tributary of the Seym), 111 km from the Russia–Ukraine border, 19 km east of the district center – the town Kursk, 6 km from the selsoviet center – Besedino.

Climate

Petrovskoye has a warm-summer humid continental climate (Dfb in the Köppen climate classification).

== Transport ==
Petrovskoye is located 5 km from the federal route P-298 (Kursk – Voronezh – P-22 "Kaspy" Highway; a part of the European route E38), on the roads of intermunicipal significance: 38H-530 (Otreshkovo – Petrovskoye – Besedino), 38H-536 (Petrovskoye – 1st Pisklovo) and 38H-537 (Petrovskoye – Bolshoye Maltsevo), 7.5 km from the nearest railway station Otreshkovo (railway line Kursk – 146 km).

The rural locality is situated 19 km from Kursk Vostochny Airport, 120 km from Belgorod International Airport and 184 km from Voronezh Peter the Great Airport.
