= Otreshkovo =

Rural locality in Kursk Oblast, Russia

Otreshkovo Отрешково
- Selo
- Interactive map of Otreshkovo
- Location of Otreshkovo Otreshkovo (Kursk Oblast)
- Coordinates: 51°47′24″N 36°30′23″E
- Country: Russia
- Federal subject: Kursk Oblast
- Administrative district: Kursky District
- SelsovietSelsoviet: Vinnikovsky

Population (2010 Census)
  - Total: 295
  - Estimate (2010): 295 (0%)

Municipal status
  - Municipal district: Kursky Municipal District
  - Rural settlement: Vinnikovsky Selsoviet Rural Settlement
- Time zone: UTC+3 (MSK)
- Postal code: 305510
- Dialing code: +7 4712
- OKTMO ID: 38620420136
- Website: vinnikovo.rkursk.ru

Otreshkovo (Russian: Отрешково) is a rural locality (Russian: село, lit. 'village') in Vinnikovsky Selsoviet Rural Settlement, Kursky District, Kursk Oblast, Russia. Population: 295 (2010 census); 317 (2002 census);

== Geography ==
The village is located 112 km from the Russia–Ukraine border, 18 km north-east of the district center – the town Kursk, 3 km from the selsoviet center – 1st Vinnikovo.

Climate

Otreshkovo has a warm-summer humid continental climate (Dfb in the Köppen climate classification).

Climate data for Otreshkovo
Month	Jan	Feb	Mar	Apr	May	Jun	Jul	Aug	Sep	Oct	Nov	Dec	Year
Mean daily maximum °C (°F)	−4.4 (24.1)	−3.5 (25.7)	2.4 (36.3)	12.8 (55.0)	19.2 (66.6)	22.5 (72.5)	25.2 (77.4)	24.5 (76.1)	18 (64)	10.4 (50.7)	3.1 (37.6)	−1.4 (29.5)	10.7 (51.3)
Daily mean °C (°F)	−6.5 (20.3)	−6 (21)	−1.2 (29.8)	7.9 (46.2)	14.5 (58.1)	18.2 (64.8)	20.8 (69.4)	19.9 (67.8)	13.8 (56.8)	7 (45)	0.9 (33.6)	−3.4 (25.9)	7.2 (44.9)
Mean daily minimum °C (°F)	−9 (16)	−9.1 (15.6)	−5.3 (22.5)	2.3 (36.1)	8.8 (47.8)	12.7 (54.9)	15.6 (60.1)	14.7 (58.5)	9.5 (49.1)	3.7 (38.7)	−1.5 (29.3)	−5.6 (21.9)	3.1 (37.5)
Average precipitation mm (inches)	51 (2.0)	44 (1.7)	46 (1.8)	50 (2.0)	60 (2.4)	69 (2.7)	72 (2.8)	55 (2.2)	60 (2.4)	59 (2.3)	46 (1.8)	49 (1.9)	661 (26)
Source: https://en.climate-data.org/asia/russian-federation/kursk-oblast/отрешково-656078/

== Transport ==
Otreshkovo is located 8.5 km from the federal route P-298 (Kursk – Voronezh – P-22 "Kaspy" Highway; a part of the European route E38), on the road of regional importance 38K-016 (Kursk – Kastornoye), on the road of intermunicipal significance 38H-317 (38K-016 – 1st Vinnikovo – Lipovets, with the access road to Malinovy), in the vicinity of the railway station Otreshkovo (railway line Kursk – 146 km).

The rural locality is situated 16 km from Kursk Vostochny Airport, 126 km from Belgorod International Airport and 188 km from Voronezh Peter the Great Airport.
