= Kuvshinnoye =

Rural locality in Kursk Oblast, Russia

Kuvshinnoye Кувшинное
- Selo
- Interactive map of Kuvshinnoye
- Location of Kuvshinnoye Kuvshinnoye (Kursk Oblast)
- Coordinates: 51°39′15″N 36°27′58″E
- Country: Russia
- Federal subject: Kursk Oblast
- Administrative district: Kursk District
- SelsovietSelsoviet: Besedinsky

Population (2010 Census)
  - Total: 26
  - Estimate (2010): 26 (0%)

Municipal status
  - Municipal district: Kursky Municipal District
  - Rural settlement: Besedinsky Selsoviet Rural Settlement
- Time zone: UTC+3 (MSK)
- Postal code: 305501
- Dialing code: +7 4712
- OKTMO ID: 38620408156
- Website: besedino.rkursk.ru

Kuvshinnoye (Russian: Кувшинное) is a rural locality (Russian: село, lit. 'village') in Besedinsky Selsoviet Rural Settlement, Kursky District, Kursk Oblast, Russia. Population: 26 (2010 census); 38 (2002 census);

== Geography ==
The village is located on the Seym River (a left tributary of the Desna), 100 km from the Russia–Ukraine border, 16 km south-east of the district center – the town Kursk, 6 km from the selsoviet center – Besedino.

Climate

Kuvshinnoye has a warm-summer humid continental climate (Dfb in the Köppen climate classification).

== Transport ==
Kuvshinnoye is located 6 km from the federal route P-298 (Kursk – Voronezh – P-22 "Kaspy" Highway; a part of the European route E38), 3 km from the road of regional importance 38K-014 (R-298 – Polevaya), on the road of intermunicipal significance 38H-259 (R-298 – Belomestnoye – Kuvshinnoye), 3.5 km from the nearest railway halt Kolodnoye (railway line Klyukva — Belgorod).

The rural locality is situated 17.5 km from Kursk Vostochny Airport, 111 km from Belgorod International Airport and 192 km from Voronezh Peter the Great Airport.
