= 1st Mokva =

Rural locality in Kursk Oblast, Russia

1st Mokva 1-я Моква
- Village
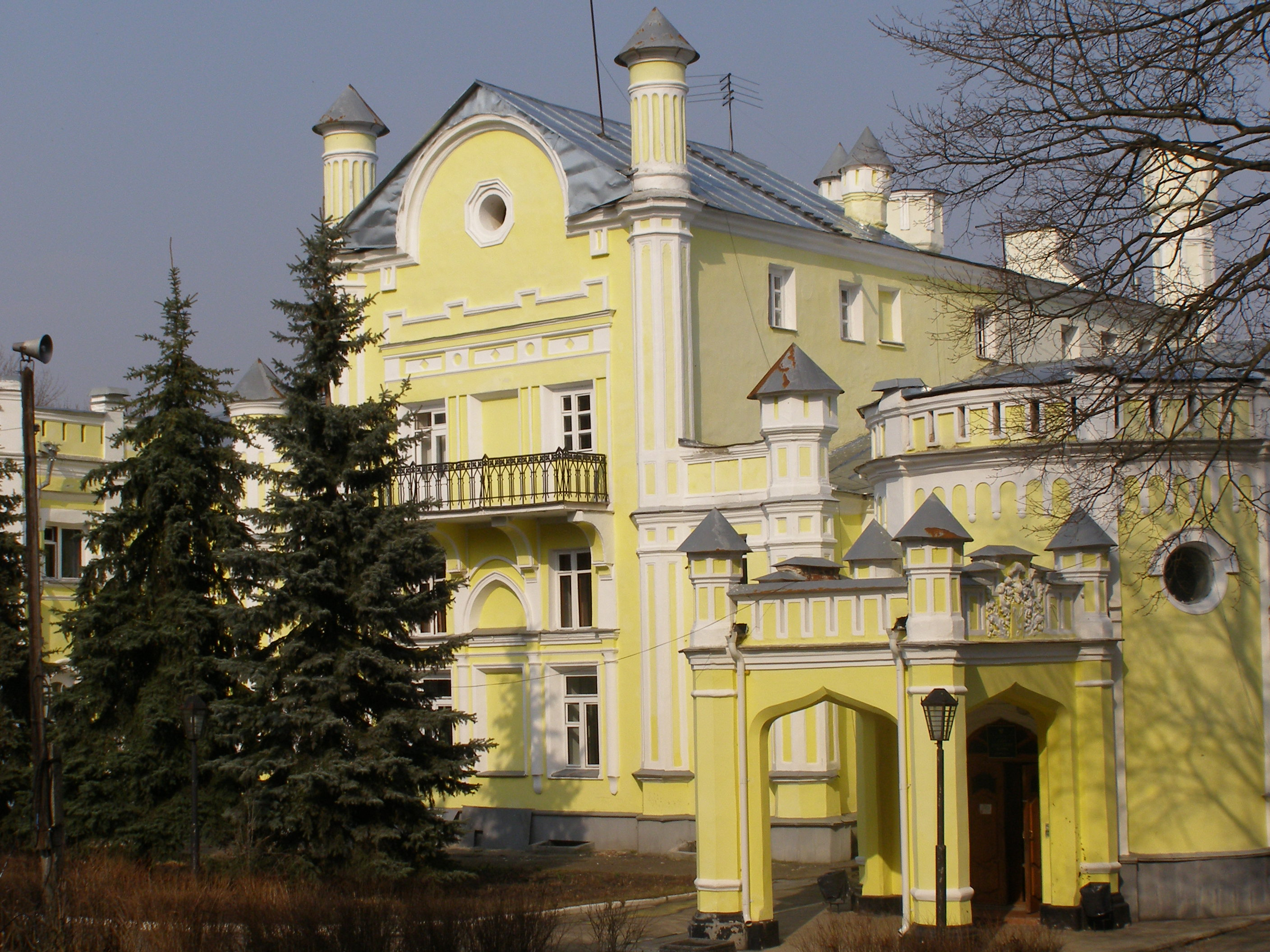
- 19th-century mansion "Mokva"
- Interactive map of 1st Mokva
- Location of 1st Mokva 1st Mokva (Kursk Oblast)
- Coordinates: 51°43′08″N 36°05′23″E
- Country: Russia
- Federal subject: Kursk Oblast
- Administrative district: Kursky District
- SelsovietSelsoviet: Mokovsky

Population (2010 Census)
  - Total: 1,823
  - Estimate (2010): 1,823 (0%)

Administrative status
  - Capital of: Mokovsky Selsoviet

Municipal status
  - Municipal district: Kursky Municipal District
  - Rural settlement: Mokovsky Selsoviet Rural Settlement
  - Capital of: Mokovsky Selsoviet Rural Settlement
- Time zone: UTC+3 (MSK)
- Postal code: 305520
- Dialing code: +7 4712
- OKTMO ID: 38620436101
- Website: mokva.rkursk.ru

1st Mokva or Pervaya Mokva (Russian: 1-я Моква, Первая Моква) is a rural locality (Russian: деревня, lit. 'village') and the administrative center of Mokovsky Selsoviet Rural Settlement, Kursky District, Kursk Oblast, Russia. Population: 1,823 (2010 census); 1,440 (2002 census);

== Geography ==
The village is located on the Mokva River (a right tributary of the Seym River basin), 85 km from the Russia–Ukraine border, on the western border of the district center – the town Kursk (10 km west of it by road). Mokva is the nearest rural locality.

=== Streets ===
There are the following streets in the village: Baklashovka, Veselaya, Vesennaya, Gorodskaya, Druzhnaya, Zagorodnaya, Zarechnaya, Zelenaya, Kozhevennaya, Koltsevaya, Kurskaya, Lesnaya, Luchistaya, Mayskaya, Malinovaya, Mokovskaya, Nelidova Pereulok, Nelidova, Orekhovaya, Parkovaya, Peschanaya, Pochtovaya, Priluzhnaya, Progonnaya, Ryabinovaya, Sadovaya, Sanatornaya, Svobodnaya, Slavyanskaya, Sosnovskaya, Tenistyy Pereulok, Troickaya, Centralnaya, Centralnyн 1st Pereulok, Shkolnaya, Svetlaya, Svetlyj Pereulok, Dubravnaya, Olhovaya, Bagryanaya, Malaya Polyanka and Parkovy Pereulok (859 houses).

=== Climate ===
1st Mokva has a warm-summer humid continental climate (Dfb in the Köppen climate classification).

Climate data for 1st Mokva
Month	Jan	Feb	Mar	Apr	May	Jun	Jul	Aug	Sep	Oct	Nov	Dec	Year
Mean daily maximum °C (°F)	−4.2 (24.4)	−3.2 (26.2)	2.7 (36.9)	13 (55)	19.4 (66.9)	22.7 (72.9)	25.4 (77.7)	24.7 (76.5)	18.2 (64.8)	10.5 (50.9)	3.3 (37.9)	−1.2 (29.8)	10.9 (51.7)
Daily mean °C (°F)	−6.2 (20.8)	−5.7 (21.7)	−0.8 (30.6)	8.2 (46.8)	14.8 (58.6)	18.4 (65.1)	21 (70)	20.1 (68.2)	14 (57)	7.3 (45.1)	1.1 (34.0)	−3.2 (26.2)	7.4 (45.3)
Mean daily minimum °C (°F)	−8.7 (16.3)	−8.8 (16.2)	−4.9 (23.2)	2.7 (36.9)	9.1 (48.4)	13.1 (55.6)	15.9 (60.6)	15 (59)	9.7 (49.5)	3.9 (39.0)	−1.3 (29.7)	−5.4 (22.3)	3.4 (38.1)
Average precipitation mm (inches)	51 (2.0)	45 (1.8)	47 (1.9)	50 (2.0)	62 (2.4)	71 (2.8)	73 (2.9)	55 (2.2)	59 (2.3)	59 (2.3)	47 (1.9)	49 (1.9)	668 (26.4)
Source: https://en.climate-data.org/asia/russian-federation/kursk-oblast/1-я-моква-656534/

== Transport ==
1st Mokva is located on the federal route M-2 Crimea Highway (a part of the European route E105), 8 km from the nearest railway station Ryshkovo (railway line Lgov I — Kursk).

The rural locality is situated 14 km from Kursk Vostochny Airport, 122 km from Belgorod International Airport and 217 km from Voronezh Peter the Great Airport.
