= Kastornoye =

Coordinates: 51°49′45″N 38°07′45″E

Kastornoye (Russian: Кастóрное) is an urban locality (an urban-type settlement) and the administrative center of Kastorensky District of Kursk Oblast, Russia. Population: 3,461 (2021 census); 3,848 (2010 census); 4,492 (2002 census); 4,562 (1989 Soviet census). Telephone code: +7 47157; postal code: 306700.

It was first mentioned in 1590 and was granted urban-type settlement status in 1959.

At Kastornoye, 2 railway lines are crossing each other. The first one is the line Moscow – Yelets – Valuyki built in 1897, the second one is the line Kursk – Voronezh built in 1894. This gave the city a strategic importance, which led to 2 important battles during the 20th century around the city. The first one was the Voronezh–Kastornoye operation (1919) during the Russian Civil War. The second one was the Voronezh–Kastornoye operation (1943) during the Second World War.
