= Polyanskoye, Kursk Oblast =

Rural locality in Kursk Oblast, Russia

Polyanskoye Полянское
- Selo
- Interactive map of Polyanskoye
- Location of Polyanskoye Polyanskoye (Kursk Oblast)
- Coordinates: 51°45′02″N 35°58′49″E
- Country: Russia
- Federal subject: Kursk Oblast
- Administrative district: Kursky District
- SelsovietSelsoviet: Polyansky

Population (2010 Census)
  - Total: 752
  - Estimate (2010): 752 (0%)

Administrative status
  - Capital of: Polyansky Selsoviet

Municipal status
  - Municipal district: Kursky Municipal District
  - Rural settlement: Polyansky Selsoviet Rural Settlement
  - Capital of: Polyansky Selsoviet Rural Settlement
- Time zone: UTC+3 (MSK)
- Postal code: 305521
- Dialing code: +7 4712
- OKTMO ID: 38620472101
- Website: polanskoe.rkursk.ru

Polyanskoye (Russian: Полянское) is a rural locality (Russian: село, lit. 'village') and the administrative center of Polyansky Selsoviet Rural Settlement, Kursky District, Kursk Oblast, Russia. Population: 752 (2010 census); 780 (2002 census);

== Geography ==
The village is located on the Bolshaya Kuritsa River (a right tributary of the Seym River), 82 km from the Russia–Ukraine border, 14 km west of Kursk.

Climate

Polyanskoye has a warm-summer humid continental climate (Dfb in the Köppen climate classification).

Climate data for Polyanskoye
Month	Jan	Feb	Mar	Apr	May	Jun	Jul	Aug	Sep	Oct	Nov	Dec	Year
Mean daily maximum °C (°F)	−4.3 (24.3)	−3.3 (26.1)	2.5 (36.5)	12.8 (55.0)	19.2 (66.6)	22.5 (72.5)	25.2 (77.4)	24.4 (75.9)	18 (64)	10.4 (50.7)	3.2 (37.8)	−1.3 (29.7)	10.8 (51.4)
Daily mean °C (°F)	−6.3 (20.7)	−5.8 (21.6)	−1.1 (30.0)	8 (46)	14.6 (58.3)	18.2 (64.8)	20.8 (69.4)	19.9 (67.8)	13.8 (56.8)	7.1 (44.8)	1 (34)	−3.3 (26.1)	7.2 (45.0)
Mean daily minimum °C (°F)	−8.9 (16.0)	−8.9 (16.0)	−5.2 (22.6)	2.5 (36.5)	8.9 (48.0)	12.8 (55.0)	15.7 (60.3)	14.7 (58.5)	9.6 (49.3)	3.8 (38.8)	−1.4 (29.5)	−5.5 (22.1)	3.2 (37.7)
Average precipitation mm (inches)	51 (2.0)	45 (1.8)	47 (1.9)	50 (2.0)	62 (2.4)	71 (2.8)	73 (2.9)	55 (2.2)	59 (2.3)	59 (2.3)	47 (1.9)	49 (1.9)	668 (26.4)
Source: https://en.climate-data.org/asia/russian-federation/kursk-oblast/полянское-319648/

== Transport ==
Polyanskoye is located 7 km from the federal route M-2 Crimea Highway (a part of the European route E105), on the road of intermunicipal significance 38H-197 (M2 "Crimea Highway" – Polyanskoye – border of the Oktyabrsky District), 11 km from the nearest railway station Dyakonovo (railway line Lgov I — Kursk).

The rural locality is situated 21 km from Kursk Vostochny Airport, 129 km from Belgorod International Airport and 224 km from Voronezh Peter the Great Airport.
