= Besedino, Kursk Oblast =

Rural locality in Kursk Oblast, Russia

Besedino Беседино
- Selo
- Interactive map of Besedino
- Location of Besedino Besedino (Kursk Oblast)
- Coordinates: 51°42′27″N 36°28′43″E
- Country: Russia
- Federal subject: Kursk Oblast
- Administrative district: Kursky District
- SelsovietSelsoviet: Besedinsky

Population (2010 Census)
  - Total: 1,154
  - Estimate (2010): 1,154 (0%)

Administrative status
  - Capital of: Besedinsky Selsoviet

Municipal status
  - Municipal district: Kursky Municipal District
  - Rural settlement: Besedinsky Selsoviet Rural Settlement
  - Capital of: Besedinsky Selsoviet Rural Settlement
- Time zone: UTC+3 (MSK)
- Postal code: 305501
- Dialing code: +7 4712
- OKTMO ID: 38620408101
- Website: besedino.rkursk.ru

Besedino (Russian: Беседино) is a rural locality (Russian: село, lit. 'village') and the administrative center of Besedinsky Selsoviet Rural Settlement, Kursky District, Kursk Oblast, Russia. Population: 1,154 (2010 census); 1,158 (2002 census);

== Geography ==
The village is located on the Rat River (a right tributary of the Seym), 105 km from the Russia–Ukraine border, 13 km east of the district center – the town Kursk.

Streets

There is Solovyinaya street and 438 houses.

Climate

Besedino has a warm-summer humid continental climate (Dfb in the Köppen climate classification).

Climate data for Besedino
Month	Jan	Feb	Mar	Apr	May	Jun	Jul	Aug	Sep	Oct	Nov	Dec	Year
Mean daily maximum °C (°F)	−4.3 (24.3)	−3.3 (26.1)	2.6 (36.7)	13 (55)	19.4 (66.9)	22.7 (72.9)	25.4 (77.7)	24.7 (76.5)	18.2 (64.8)	10.5 (50.9)	3.2 (37.8)	−1.3 (29.7)	10.9 (51.6)
Daily mean °C (°F)	−6.3 (20.7)	−5.9 (21.4)	−1 (30)	8.1 (46.6)	14.7 (58.5)	18.3 (64.9)	21 (70)	20 (68)	14 (57)	7.2 (45.0)	1 (34)	−3.3 (26.1)	7.3 (45.2)
Mean daily minimum °C (°F)	−8.9 (16.0)	−9 (16)	−5.1 (22.8)	2.6 (36.7)	9 (48)	12.9 (55.2)	15.8 (60.4)	14.8 (58.6)	9.6 (49.3)	3.8 (38.8)	−1.3 (29.7)	−5.5 (22.1)	3.2 (37.8)
Average precipitation mm (inches)	51 (2.0)	44 (1.7)	46 (1.8)	50 (2.0)	60 (2.4)	69 (2.7)	72 (2.8)	55 (2.2)	60 (2.4)	59 (2.3)	46 (1.8)	49 (1.9)	661 (26)
Source: https://en.climate-data.org/asia/russian-federation/kursk-oblast/беседино-319135/

== Transport ==
Besedino is located on the federal route P-298 (Kursk – Voronezh – P-22 "Kaspy" Highway; a part of the European route E38), on the road of regional importance 38K-014 (R-298 – Polevaya), on the road of intermunicipal significance 38H-259 (R-298 – Belomestnoye – Kuvshinnoye), 8.5 km from the nearest railway halt Zaplava (railway line Klyukva — Belgorod).

The rural locality is situated 15 km from Kursk Vostochny Airport, 117 km from Belgorod International Airport and 190 km from Voronezh Peter the Great Airport.
