= Timeline of the Russo-Ukrainian war (1 January 2025 – 31 May 2025) =

Timeline of the Russo-Ukrainian war (2022–present)
- Prelude; (up to 23 February 2022); Initial invasion; (24 February – 7 April 2022); Southeastern front; (8 April – 28 August 2022); 2022 Ukrainian counteroffensives; (29 August – 11 November 2022); Second stalemate; (12 November 2022 – 7 June 2023); 2023 Ukrainian counteroffensive; (8 June 2023 – 31 August 2023); 2023 Ukrainian counteroffensive, cont.; (1 September – 30 November 2023); 2023–2024 winter campaigns; (1 December 2023 – 31 March 2024); 2024 spring and summer campaigns; (1 April – 31 July 2024); 2024 summer–autumn offensives; (1 August – 31 December 2024); 2025 winter–spring offensives; (1 January 2025 – 31 May 2025); 2025 summer offensives; (1 June 2025 – 31 August 2025); 2025 autumn–winter offensives; (1 September 2025 – 31 December 2025); 2026 winter–spring offensives; (1 January 2026 – 31 May 2026); 2026 summer offensives; (1 June 2026 – 31 August 2026); 2026 autumn–winter offensives; (1 September 2026 – present)

This timeline of the Russo-Ukrainian war covers the period from 1 January to 31 May 2025.

== January 2025 ==
=== 1 January ===
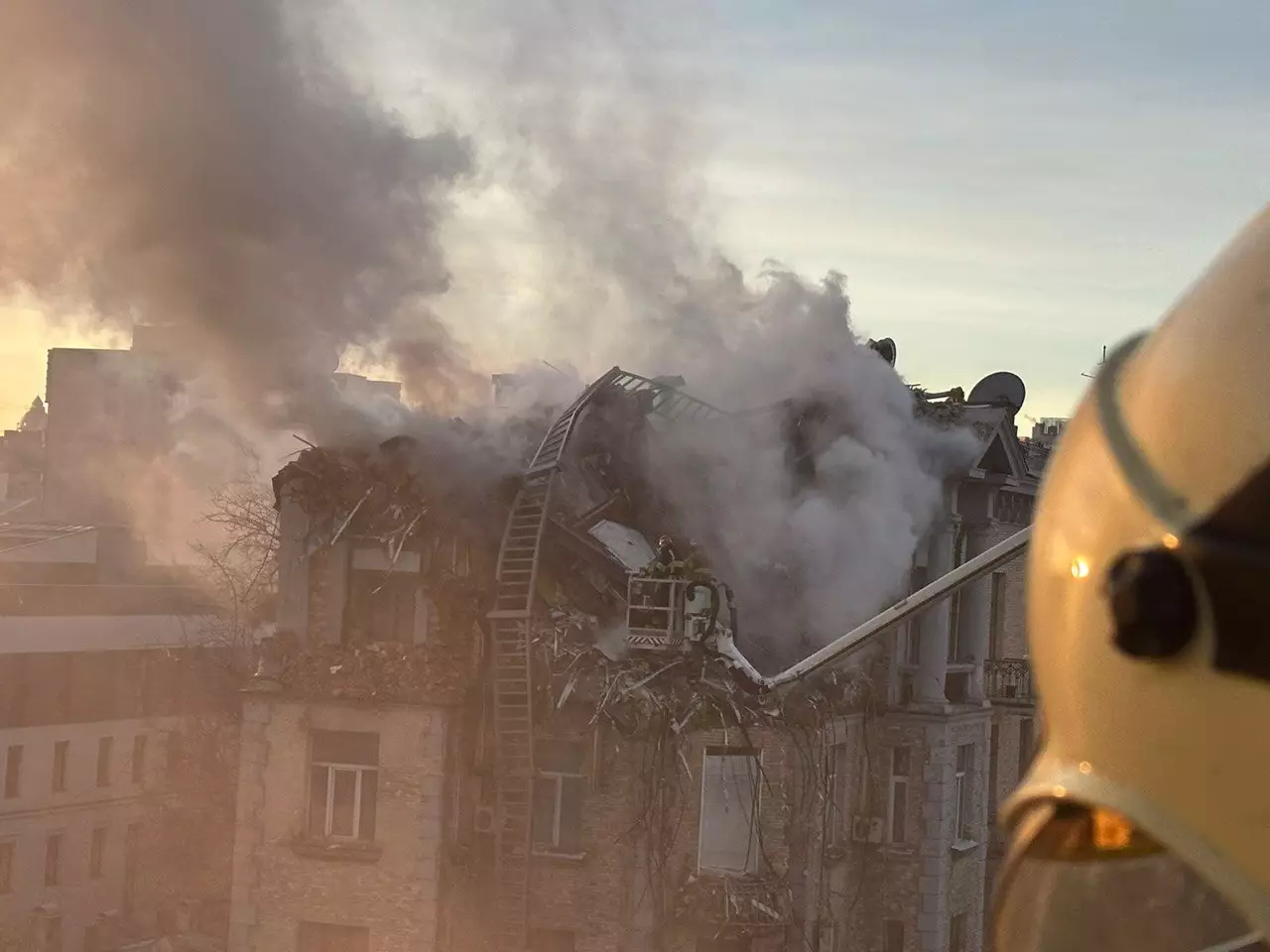
Damaged building in Kyiv after the 1 January attack

A drone attack in Kyiv killed two people and injured at least six others, and also damaged the main building of the National Bank of Ukraine.

Ukrainian commander-in-chief Oleksandr Syrskyi claimed that Russia had lost some 38,000 soldiers in Kursk, while 700 others were captured and over 1,000 pieces of equipment destroyed.

=== 2 January ===
One person was killed in a Russian airstrike on Stepnohirsk, Zaporizhzhia Oblast.

Geo-located footage confirmed Russia's control over the village of Vozdvyzhenka in Donetsk Oblast.

A Ukrainian strike against Ivanovskoye in Kursk Oblast reportedly killed seven Russian servicemen.

Ukrainian authorities announced an investigation following reports that hundreds of soldiers had defected from the 155th Mechanized Brigade during training in France.

=== 3 January ===
One person was killed in a Russian drone strike in Kyiv Oblast. One person was killed in a missile attack on Chernihiv.

Russian captain Konstantin Nagayko was critically wounded in an explosion in Ivanovo Oblast, Russia according to the HUR. He was a battery commander in the 112th Missile Brigade, 1st Tank Army of the Western Military District of Russia, the unit accused of killing 59 civilians in the 2023 Hroza missile attack in Kharkiv Oblast.

A Ukrainian military observer said that Russian forces captured the village of Shevchenko, west of Stari Terny, and the Kurakhove Power Station. Geo-located footage showed that Russian forces captured the village of Vovkove, south of Pokrovsk.

=== 4 January ===
A drone attack caused a two-hour suspension of operations at Pulkovo Airport in Saint Petersburg. The drones attacked the seaport at Ust-Luga, damaging a window. Four drones were downed over Leningrad Oblast with "electronic warfare and firearms" according to the local governor.

Alexander Martemyanov, a Russian freelance reporter, was killed by a Ukrainian drone while returning from reporting in Horlivka, Donetsk Oblast. Four other media workers were also injured according to RIA Novosti.

The Russian defense ministry claimed to have shot down eight US-made ATACMS missiles and 72 UAVs launched by Ukraine in Russian territory, with some drones being shot down in Leningrad and Kursk Oblasts.

Russian forces claimed to have captured the village of Vodiane Druhe, east of Pokrovsk.

The 155th Mechanized brigade was effectively disbanded, with remaining elements assigned to other brigades.

=== 5 January ===
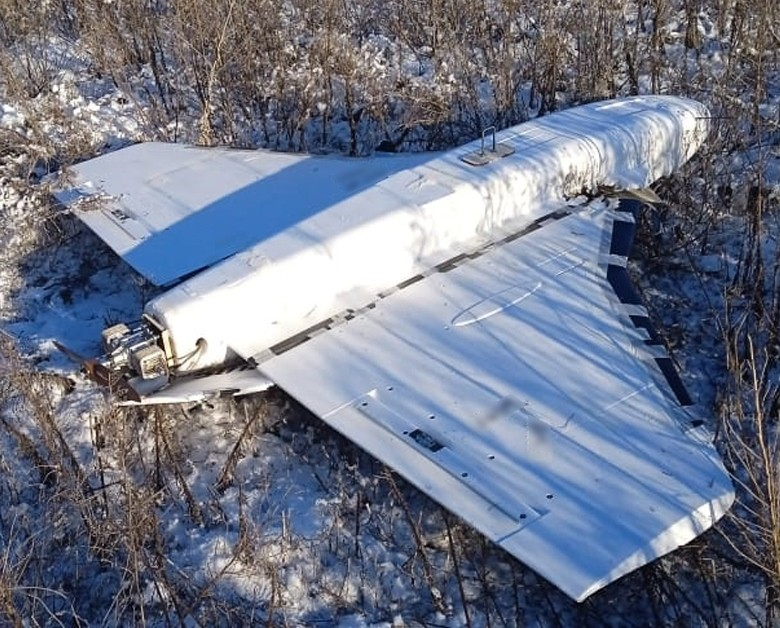
Russian drone Gerbera, shot in Ukraine

Ukrainian forces launched a renewed offensive "in several directions" in Kursk Oblast. Russian milbloggers claimed that Russian forces repulsed attacks in two of these directions. The Russian Defense ministry said that at 09:00 Moscow Time, Ukrainian forces started attacking from their bases in Sudzha towards the villages of Berdin and Bolshoye Soldatskoye consisting of two tanks, one counter-obstacle vehicle, and 12 armoured fighting vehicles. Later Russian sources claimed that Ukrainian forces captured the settlements of Cherkasskoye Porechnoye, Martynovka, and Mikhaylovka.

Geo-located footage showed that Russian forces likely captured the villages of Svyrydonivka and Tymofiivka near Pokrovsk and the village of Petropavlivka near Stari Terny.

The HUR issued a report claiming that the Ukrainian Kraken Unit killed the chief of staff of the Storm Ossetia Battalion, Sergei Melnikov, and his driver using drones along the Vasylivka-Tokmak highway in Zaporizhzhia Oblast.

Ukrainian president Volodymyr Zelenskyy claimed 3,800 North Korean soldiers have been killed or wounded out of the original 12,000 sent to fight Ukrainian forces.

=== 6 January ===
One person was killed in a Russian drone strike on a bus in Kherson.

Russian forces claimed to have taken Kurakhove. Russian sources claimed that Ukrainian forces took the village of Russkoye Porechnoye in Kursk Oblast.

Ukraine claimed to have destroyed or damaged two Russian Pantsir-S1 anti-aircraft missile systems and one OSA anti-aircraft vehicle using sea-launched aerial drones in occupied Kherson Oblast.

The SBU said it had discovered a Russian plot to bomb a military installation in Kyiv Oblast by hiring a 16-year-old boy to deliver explosives, leading to the arrest of four suspects.

=== 7 January ===
Ukrainian forces conducted a "precision strike" on the headquarters of the Russian 810th Guards Naval Infantry Brigade in Belaya, Kursk Oblast.

In Kursk Oblast, Russian milbloggers claimed that Russian forces recaptured the hamlets of Staraya Sorochina, Kositsa and Berdin, and the villages of Russkoye Porechnoye, Makhnovka and Novosotnitskii.

=== 8 January ===
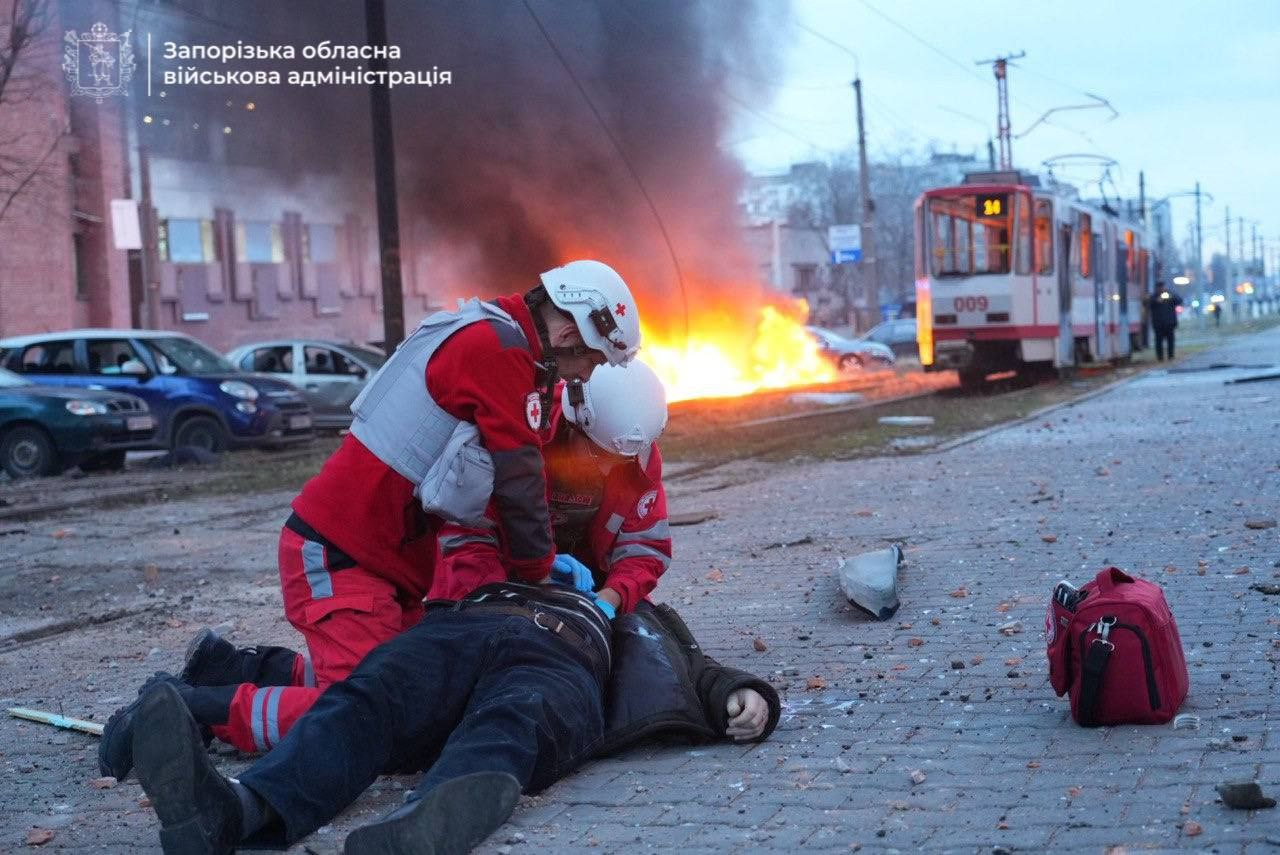
Street of Zaporizhzhia after the bombing

Thirteen people were killed in a Russian airstrike on an industrial facility in Zaporizhzhia.

Ukrainian forces attacked the Kristal oil depot in Engels, Saratov Oblast, supplying fuel to the Engels-2 air base and Russian strategic bombers based there. Approximately 800,000 tons of jet fuel was reportedly destroyed by the fire.

Ukrainian special forces destroyed various Russian equipment in Donetsk Oblast with drones, including a Pole-21 Electronic Warfare System, which is used to disrupt GPS signals. Ukrainian forces also claimed to have bombed a command post of the Russian 8th Combined Arms Army in Khartsyzk.

Two paratroopers from the Ukrainian 79th Separate Air Assault Brigade reportedly captured 14 Russian soldiers after throwing grenades at their dugout.

=== 9 January ===
Ukrainian officials confirmed that Russian forces had established a bridgehead across the Oskil River in Kharkiv Oblast near Dvorichna.

In Kursk Oblast, geo-located footage showed that Russian forces captured the hamlets of Alexandriya and Leonidovo. Russian milbloggers claimed that Russian forces captured the village of Pogrebki.

At the Ramstein meeting, Norway pledged a military aid package of 2 billion euros for Ukraine over 2025. Canada pledged $330 million in military aid, while the US announced an aid package of $500 million. The UK announced it, and other allies, would send 30,000 fpv drones to Ukraine. Germany would deliver 6 IRIS-T launchers as well.

Zelenskyy claimed North Korea lost 4,000 soldiers killed and wounded.

=== 10 January ===
Russian-installed authorities in Donetsk Oblast claimed that three people were killed in Ukrainian airstrikes in Donetsk city and Svitlodarsk. The Ukrainian military claimed it had carried out a strike on a command post of the Russian 3rd Army Corps in Svitlodarsk.

A Ukrainian drone and Neptune missile attack hit a Russian ammunition depot in the village of Chaltyr, Rostov Oblast, according to the HUR. Other drone attacks were reported in Leningrad Oblast, with one strike causing a fire at an industrial area in Gatchina that burned 1,900 square meters.

The Ukrainian Ministry of Defence said that the Polish-trained Ukrainian Legion had received 1,300 applications from Ukrainians living abroad wanting to join, including women.

Russian forces claimed to have captured the villages of Baranivka, east of Pokrovsk and Yasenove, southwest of Pokrovsk.

=== 11 January ===
Russian officials claimed that three people were injured after a drone crashed into an apartment in Kotovsk, Tambov Oblast.

Zelenskyy claimed that two North Korean soldiers had been captured in Kursk Oblast.

Ukrainian drones attacked the Russian Port of Novorossiysk, causing a massive fire.

An oil-processing plant in Tatarstan, Russia was struck by Ukrainian drones, prompting evacuations.

Syrskyi ordered the transfer of additional Ukrainian Air Force personnel to ground infantry units, reportedly numbering 5,000 soldiers.

A Ukrainian military observer claimed that Russian forces took the village of Hryhorivka, north of Chasiv Yar. Russian forces captured the village of Neskuchne, south of Velyka Novosilka.

On 24 September 2026, President Zelenskyy said that Ukraine had transferred two North Korean soldiers, who had been captured, to South Korean custody. They were captured by Ukrainian forces during the Kursk campaign on 11 January 2025.

=== 12 January ===
Russian forces claimed to have taken the villages of Yantarne, ten kilometers southwest of Kurakhove, Kalynove along the Oskil River, and Zelene, south of Pokrovsk.

Russian-installed authorities in Kherson Oblast claimed that one person was killed and three others were injured in Ukrainian drone strikes.

A Russian source claimed that Russian forces crossed the international border into Sumy Oblast and advanced south of the village of Prokhody.

=== 13 January ===
Geo-located footage showed that Russian forces had captured the village of Pishchane, south of Pokrovsk, and severed two highways leading east (to Kostiantynivka) and west (to Mezhova) out of Pokrovsk.

Russia accused Ukraine of using drones to inflict minor damage on infrastructure of the TurkStream gas pipeline near Gaikodzor, Krasnodar Krai.

Ukraine received its first RCH 155 from Germany.

South Korean intelligence claimed that 300 North Koreans had been killed and 2,700 wounded in Kursk Oblast.

Lithuania announced 4,500 drones would be sent to Ukraine.

Reuters, citing unnamed industry sources, reported that the Pokrovs'ke coal mine had halted production due to the approaching front line. The mine was Ukraine's sole coking coal-producing facility, from which 3.5 million tons of coke were produced in 2023.

An unidentified North Korean surface to air missile system similar to the Russian Tor missile system was destroyed by a Russian drone in what appeared to be a friendly fire incident.

=== 14 January ===
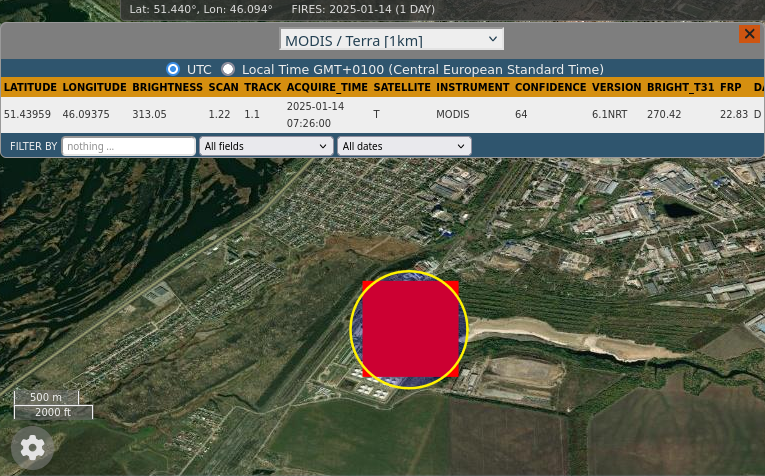
NASA's FIRMS detected fire at an Engels fuel depot on 14 January 2025 07:26:00 (UTC)

Drones attacked the town of Aleksin in Tula Oblast. Ten explosions were heard. Other attacks occurred in Bryansk Oblast, Belgorod Oblast and Crimea.

Ukrainian drones attacked the Kristal oil depot in Engels after a fire that burnt for five days was extinguished. However the regional governor said only that an "industrial facility" had been hit.

Drones struck the Kazanorgsintez industrial facility in Kazan, Tatarstan, causing a fire.

The Russian defense ministry claimed that Russian forces had captured Terny in Donetsk Oblast.

Ukrainian drones struck a distillery in the village of Novaya Lyada, Tambov Oblast. Local officials claimed a drone hit a tree and exploded.

=== 15 January ===
Russia launched another missile attack on energy infrastructure across Ukraine, causing power grid shutdowns. Two critical infrastructure facilities in Lviv Oblast were struck.

Lukoil's oil refinery in Volgograd caught fire. Local officials blamed the fire on "technical issues". However locals reported an explosion before the fire and speculated "something fell onto the plant".

Zelenskyy announced a prisoner exchange with Russia that resulted in the release of 25 Ukrainians for the same number of Russian POWs.

The Liskinskaya oil depot in Liski, Voronezh Oblast caught fire after a drone attack, according to Alexander Gusev, the local governor.

A Russian air defense captain was sentenced to three years' imprisonment for the shooting-down of a Russian Mi-8 helicopter that was mistaken for a Ukrainian drone over Crimea in October 2023 that killed three people.

=== 16 January ===
Russian media said that drones targeted a gunpowder factory in Kuz'mino-Gat village, Tambov Oblast. Air defence was activated and locals reported "aircraft-type UAVs". The Ukrainian military claimed it launched a drone strike on the Liskinskaya oil depot in Voronezh Oblast and destroyed radar equipment belonging to an S-400 air defense system in Belgorod Oblast.

The State Border Guard Service of Ukraine received a 155-mm DITA self-propelled artillery howitzer from the Czech Republic.

British Prime Minister Keir Starmer visited Kyiv and announced £4.5 billion (€5.34 billion) in aid, including 150 artillery barrels made in the UK and 15 additional Gravehawk air defence systems.

The United States declassified that it had provided substantial support for Ukraine's drone industry, beginning in late 2022 including $1.5 billion in support for drone production sent in September 2024.

=== 17 January ===
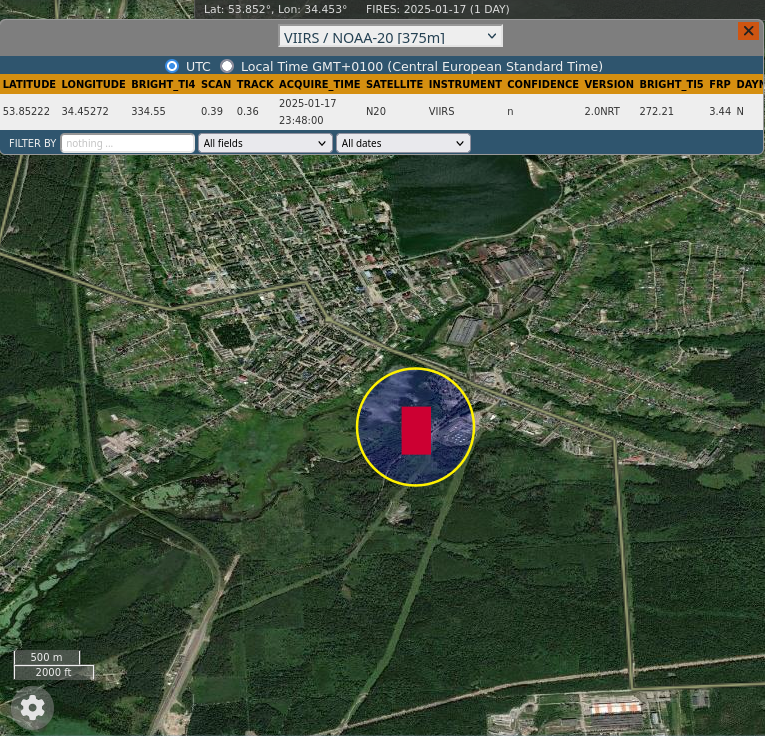
NASA's FIRMS detected fire at a Lyudinovo fuel depot on 17 January 2025 23:48:00 (UTC)

Four people were killed in a Russian missile attack on Kryvyi Rih.

Russian forces captured the village of Vremivka, west of Velyka Novosilka, and were confirmed to have captured Yasenove, southwest by south (SWbS) of Pokrovsk.

Ukrainian drones struck an oil depot in Lyudinovo, Kaluga Oblast, with falling debris causing a fire.

According to the HUR, partisans burned down two communications towers in Krasnodar.

=== 18 January ===
Destruction in Kyiv after the attack

A Russian missile strike on Kyiv damaged residential buildings, the Lukianivska metro station and the oldest McDonald's outlet in Ukraine, killing three people.

Ukrainian forces confirmed their withdrawal from the Chasivoyarsk Refractory Plant in Chasiv Yar, adding that they launched an airstrike against Russian forces inside the facility.

Ukrainian drones struck an oil depot in Uzlovaya, Tula Oblast, according to the HUR and the local governor.

Geolocated footage showed that Russian forces had entered Velyka Novosilka from the east.

The SBU arrested two people in Kyiv and Kharkiv on suspicion of leading a spy network for Russia. One of the suspects was an engineer of the Kyiv Metro.

=== 19 January ===
Zelenskyy signed a decree imposing sanctions on 18 pro-Russian Ukrainian individuals, including politicians Yuriy Boyko, Nestor Shufrych, and Yevhen Murayev.

The Ukrainian military launched an investigation into its 156th Mechanized Brigade following "a number of significant shortcomings" that were raised over its leadership and performance during inspections.

Syrskyi claimed that Russian forces had suffered 434,000 casualties, including 150,000 killed, in 2024, which he said was "more than the previous two years of the war combined".

=== 20 January ===
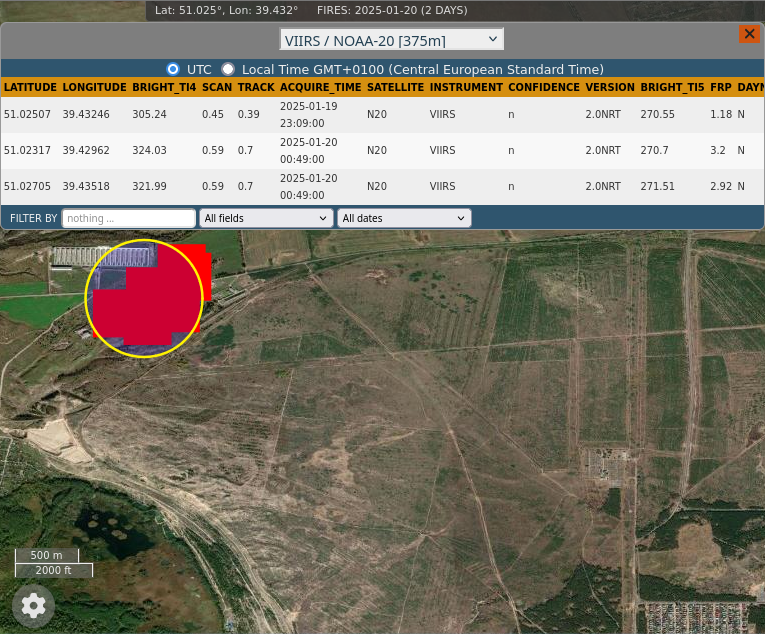
NASA's FIRMS detected extensive fire at a Liski fuel depot on 19 January 2025 23:09:00 (UTC)

The Liskinskaya oil depot was struck by Ukrainian drones again.

The Russian-installed governor of Kherson Oblast claimed that two people were killed in a Ukrainian cluster munitions attack on a school near Bekhtery.

A drone attack was reported in Kazan, causing a fire in the Aviastroitelny district and the closure of Kazan International Airport and Begishevo Airport in Nizhnekamsk.

Two Ukrainian generals and a colonel were detained by the State Bureau of Investigation for alleged negligence that led to Russia seizing territory in northern Kharkiv Oblast in May 2024. The SBI also detained the commander of the 155th Mechanized Brigade for failing to report desertions from the unit and other violations.

Geo-located footage showed that Russian forces captured the village of Kotlyne near Pokrovsk.

=== 21 January ===
Ukrainian drones struck the Smolensk Aviation Plant. Seven explosions were reported and air defence was activated according to locals. The Ukrainian military also claimed an attack on a command post of the Russian 29th Combined Arms Army in Volnovakha, Donetsk Oblast.

Former television host Max Nazarov was arrested by Ukrainian authorities on suspicion of spreading pro-Russian propaganda on his YouTube channel.

Geo-located footage showed that Russian forces captured the village of Nikolayevo-Darino in Kursk Oblast. Russian forces claimed to have captured the village of Zelenyi Hai in eastern Kharkiv Oblast.

The SBU arrested the Ukrainian army's chief psychiatrist, identified by local media as Oleh Druz, on corruption charges linked to his involvement in a panel that determined "whether individuals were fit for military service." Authorities found $152,000 (£124,000) and €34,000 in cash in his house as well as other assets valued at $1 million (£813,000).

=== 22 January ===
Russian forces captured the village of Novovasylivka in Donetsk Oblast. Russian forces also claimed to have taken the village of Zapadne, four kilometers west of the Oskil River in Kharkiv Oblast.

Russian authorities ordered the evacuation of residents from the border village of Terezovka in Belgorod Oblast amid Ukrainian attacks.

The SBU arrested a lawyer from Dnipro on suspicion of aiding a Russian missile strike on the city in December 2023 that killed six people.

=== 23 January ===
One person was killed in a Russian missile attack on Zaporizhzhia.

Authorities ordered the evacuation of children and their families from 16 settlements in the Kupiansk area amid Russian attacks that left one person dead.

In Russia, a fire broke out at the Ryazan oil refinery during a drone strike, with ten drones reportedly shot down over the facility.

North Korean forces began deploying MLRS disguised as civilian trucks in Kursk Oblast.

The Russian defense ministry claimed that Russian forces captured the village of Solone, Donetsk Oblast, southwest of Pokrovsk.

=== 24 January ===
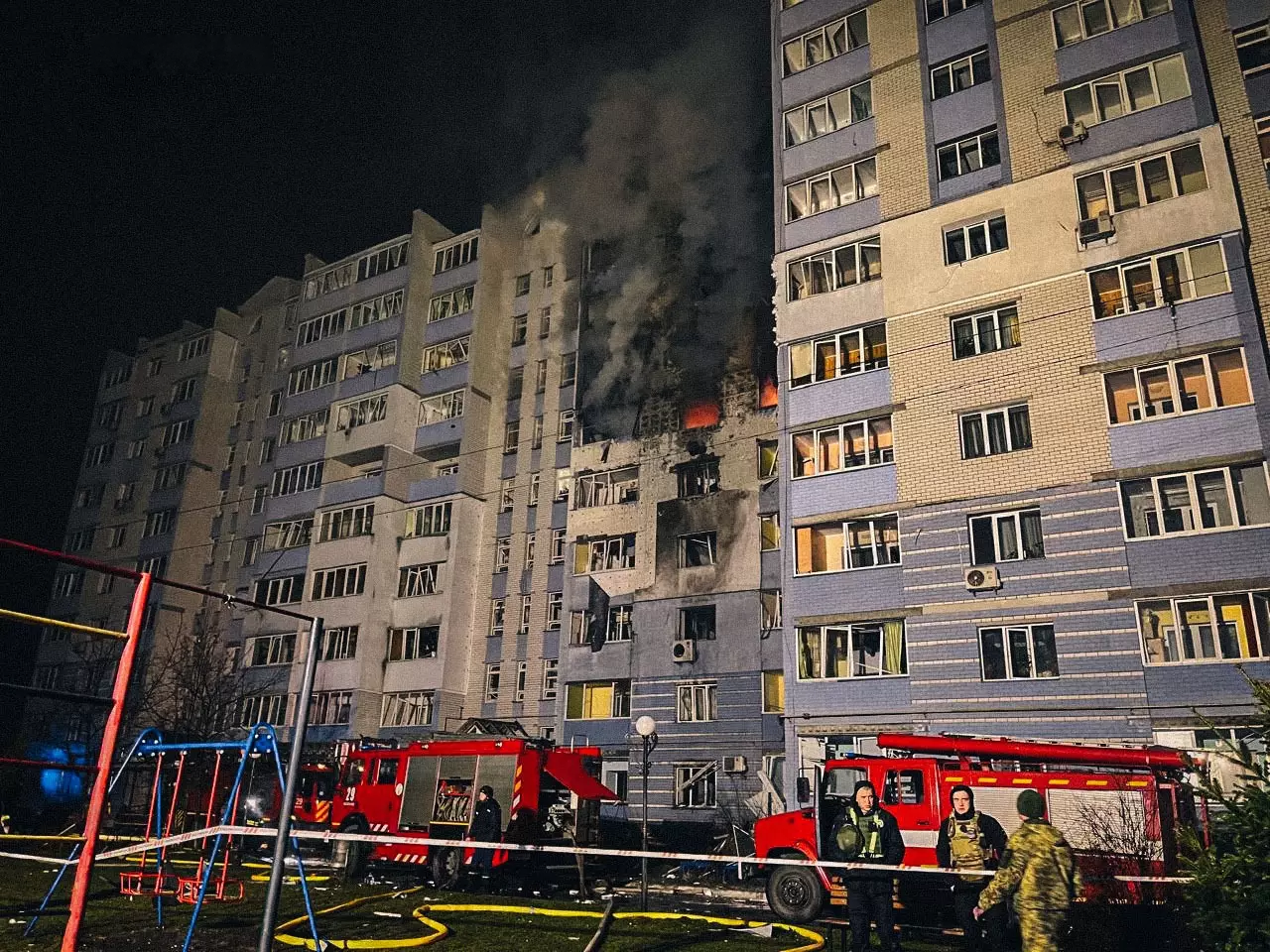
Residential building in Hlevakha (Kyiv Oblast) after the attack

Three people were killed in Russian drone strikes on Kyiv Oblast.

Ukraine launched 121 drones over thirteen regions in Russia, which the latter claimed to have destroyed, including six in Moscow Oblast and one over Moscow city. Vnukovo and Domodedovo airports were closed. A power station in Kursk and a power plant was destroyed in Ryazan, while the Kremniy EL microchip plant factory in Bryansk Oblast was damaged.

Ukrainian authorities ordered the mandatory evacuation of children from more than 20 settlements in the areas of Komar and Kryvorizhzhia in Donetsk Oblast due to Russian attacks.

The remains of 757 Ukrainian soldiers killed in action were repatriated to Ukraine in exchange for the remains of 49 Russian soldiers.

US Secretary of State Marco Rubio announced a stop on all US foreign aid awards for 90 days, with the exception of Israel and Egypt. According to Politico it "appears to include funding for military assistance to Ukraine".

Ukrainian defense minister Rustem Umerov announced the non-renewal of the tenure of Maryna Bezrukova as head of the Defense Procurement Agency (DPA), despite the DPA's board voting to extend her tenure, amid a dispute over the ministry's procurement of weapons. However, Bezrukova refused to leave her position, while Umerov also removed two members of the DPA board for supporting Bezrukova.

=== 25 January ===
The Russian-installed head of Kherson Oblast claimed that three people were killed in a Ukrainian cluster munitions attack on Oleshky.

The SBU arrested a military cadet in Lviv Oblast on suspicion of spying for Russia.

Russian forces claimed to have captured the village of Novoandriivka, south of Pokrovsk.

A boat-mounted Vampire missile equipped with APKWS shot down a Russian Kh-59 cruise missile over the Black Sea.

=== 26 January ===
Russian forces claimed to have taken Velyka Novosilka and Nadiivka, south of Pokrovsk.

The Ryazan oil refinery was struck again by drones, causing a fire. Thirty-two Ukrainian drones struck 5 regions in Russia according to Russian officials. Russian air defences claimed to have downed all 32 over Belgorod, Kursk, Oryol and Tver oblasts. The Ukrainian Air Force claimed more than 200 Shahed drones were destroyed in a drone attack on a warehouse in Oryol Oblast.

Zelenskyy announced Brigadier-General Andriy Hnatov would be replaced by Major General Mykhailo Drapatyi as the commander of the Khortytsia operational-strategic group operating in the Eastern front. Drapatyi will remain as Commander of the Ukrainian Ground Forces.

=== 27 January ===
The EU renewed sanctions against Russia.

The Ryazan Oil Refinery ceased operations due to Ukrainian drone strikes, according to Reuters.

North Korean soldiers withdrew from frontline positions in Kursk Oblast due to heavy losses, according to Ukrainian soldiers.

Ukrainian forces claimed to have destroyed an S-400 missile system during a "precision strike" at an undisclosed date and location unknown.

=== 28 January ===
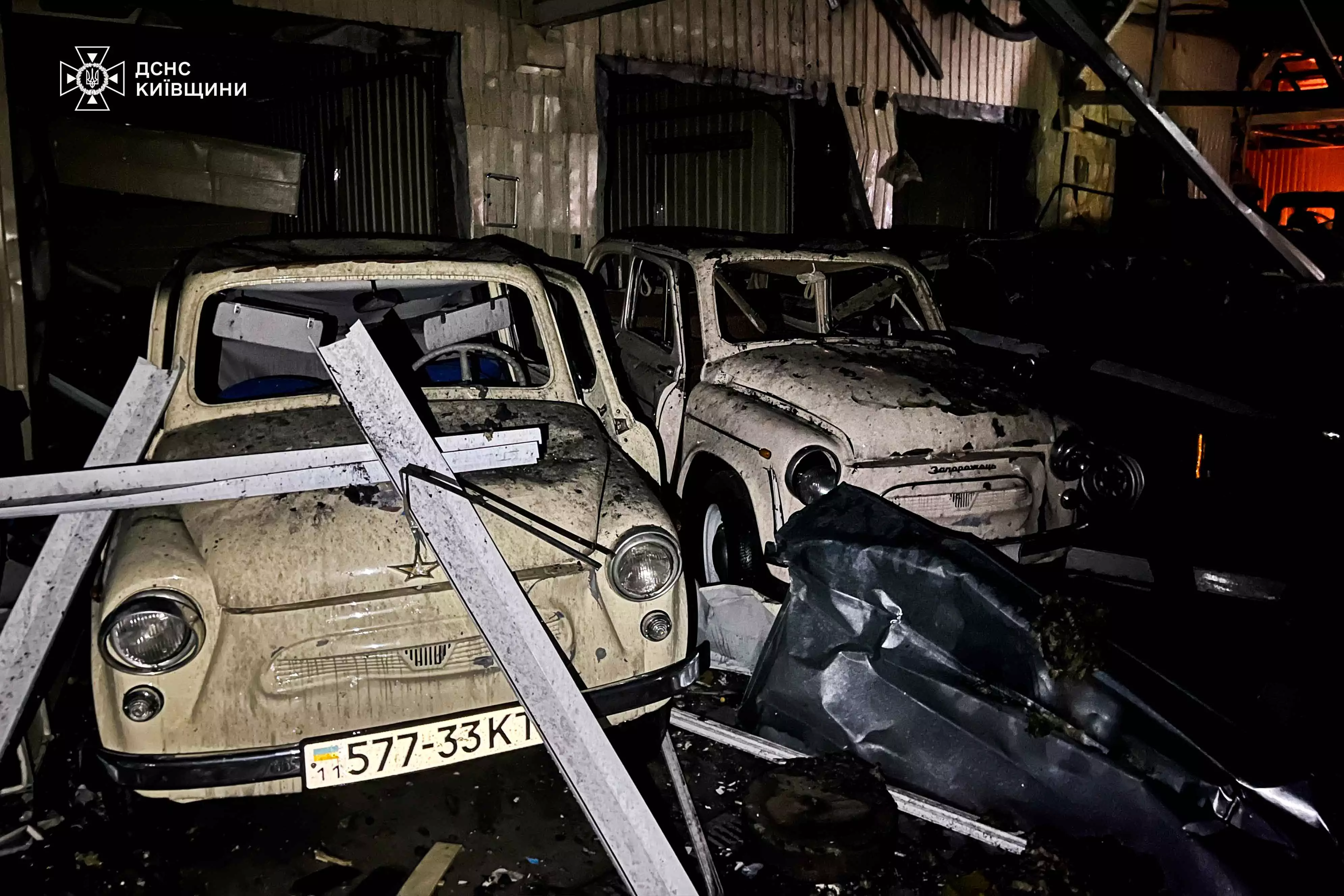
Museum of retro cars in Mezhyhirya (Kyiv Oblast), damaged by drone attack on 28 January

Two people were killed in a Russian missile attack on Mykolaiv.

Debris from a Russian drone damaged 36 cars of a vintage car museum in Kyiv Oblast as well as residential buildings.

Russia claimed to have taken Dvorichna in Kharkiv Oblast, located across the Oskil River. The Ukrainian General Staff posted a map confirming Russia's control over Novoandriivka, Uspenivka and Slovianka on the Pokrovsk front.

Two Ukrainians working with the Russian Federal Security Service (FSB) were detained by the SBU for spying on Ukrainian F-16 fighter jets.

Dmytro Klymenkov was dismissed as Ukrainian deputy defense minister amid a dispute over the ministry's procurement of weapons.

=== 29 January ===
The Lukoil Kstovo Refinery in Kstovo, Nizhny Novgorod Oblast was heavily damaged after a fire broke out during a wave of drone attacks that also targeted Smolensk, Tver, and Bryansk Oblasts. No casualties were reported by Gleb Nikitin, governor of Nizhny Novgorod, however drone debris started a fire in an enterprise at the Kstovo industrial zone. Russian officials also claimed that the Smolensk Nuclear Power Plant was also targeted. The governor of Belgorod Oblast claimed that two people were killed while two others were injured after a drone struck a house. Flights were also suspended at Kazan and Pulkovo airports. The Russian defense ministry reported that two drones were shot down in Murmansk Oblast.

The Moscow Times, citing multiple sources from Russia, Ukraine and other European countries, reported that Russian forces had taken Chasiv Yar. Ukrainian military officials denied the claim.

Ukrainian media reported that the HUR carried out a cyberattack on the Russian gas firm Gazprom and its subsidiary Gazprom Neft.

Israel transferred some 90 Patriot missiles to the United States, which were then to be transferred along with supporting equipment to Ukraine.

Bloomberg reported that Russian oil shipments through the port of Ust-Luga were suspended due to an overnight strike by Ukrainian drones. The SBU claimed the Andreapol oil pumping station was struck. The is part of the Baltic Pipeline System-II run by Transneft, a Russian state owned company. A fire and oil spill were reported. Fixed-wing UAVs that dropped FAB-250 bombs were used in the attack, indicating the usage of reusable drones instead of a "kamikaze-type".

=== 30 January ===
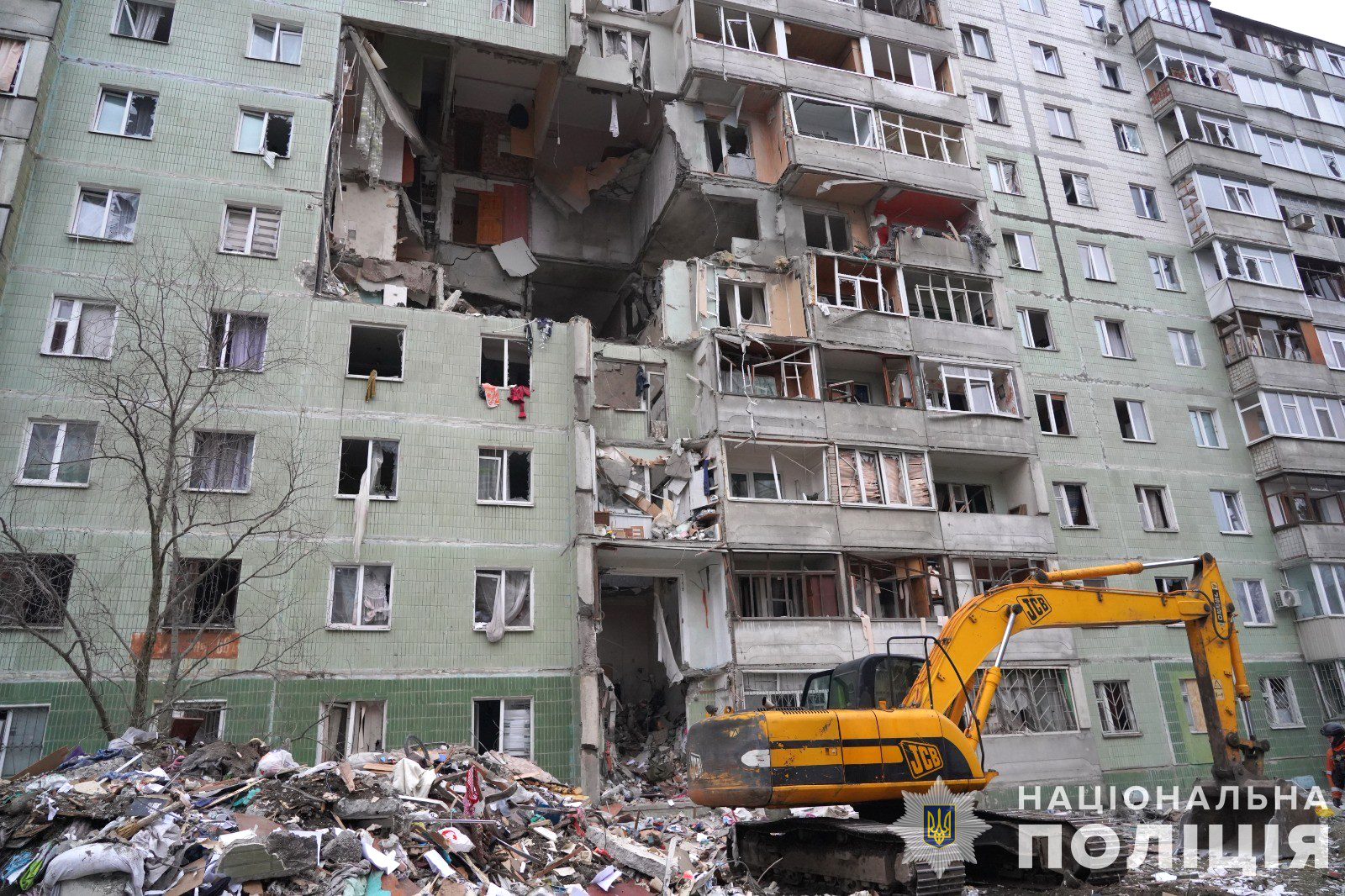
Residential building in Sumy after the attack

Nine people were killed in a Russian missile attack on Sumy.

A Russian drone strike on an evacuation vehicle in Pokrovsk injured three people including a British volunteer.

=== 31 January ===
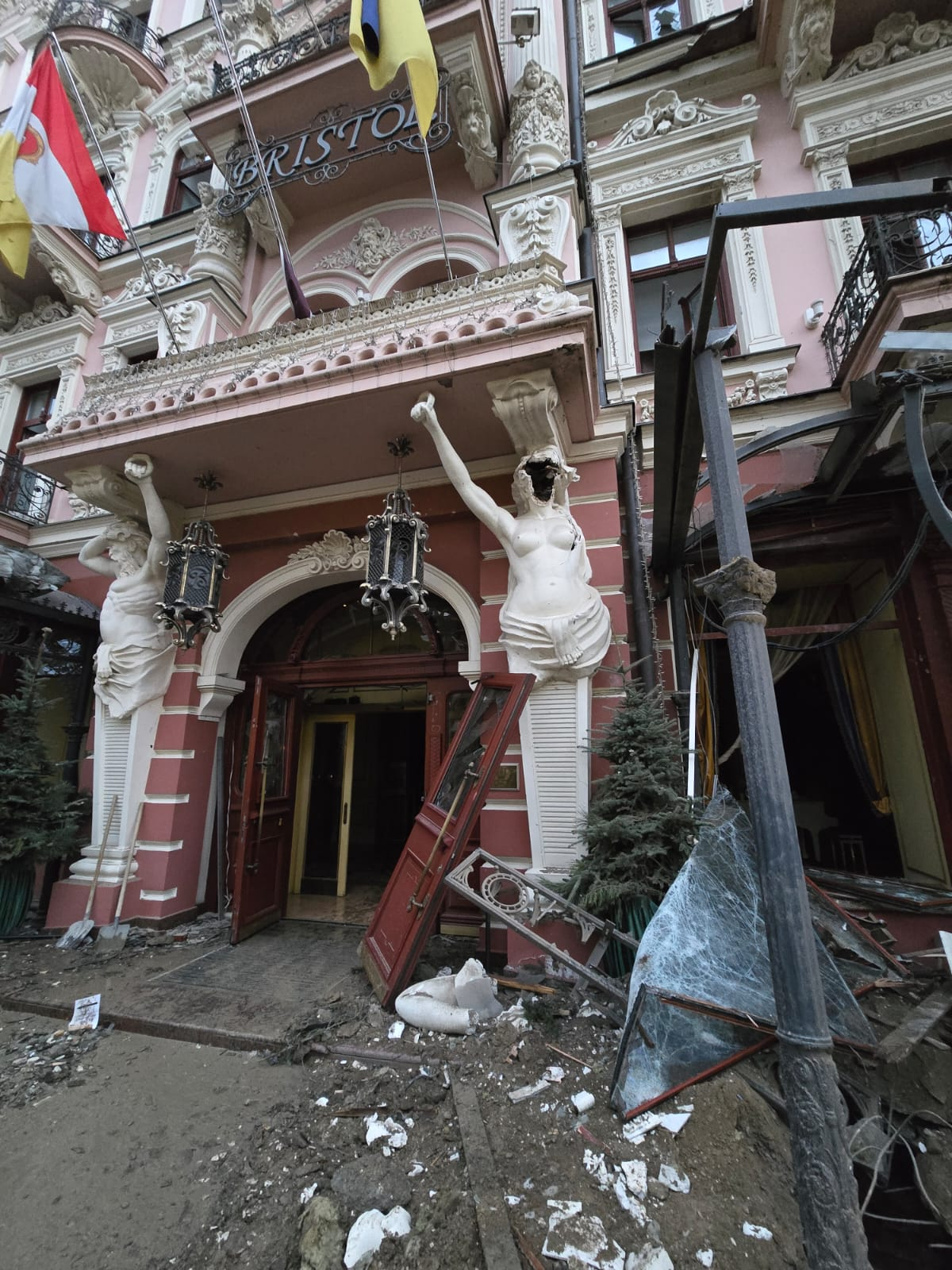
Bristol Hotel in Odesa after the attack

Seven people were injured and historic buildings (including the Bristol Hotel and the Philharmonic Theater) were damaged in a Russian missile attack on Odesa.

The Ukrainian military claimed to have destroyed a Russian command post in Rylsk, Kursk Oblast in an airstrike.

According to Russian locals an oil refinery in Volgograd was targeted by Ukrainian drones, causing a fire and an explosion.

Sweden announced a military aid package worth 13.5 billion Swedish kronor ($1.23 billion) for Ukraine, the largest aid package thus far from Sweden.

== February 2025 ==
=== 1 February ===
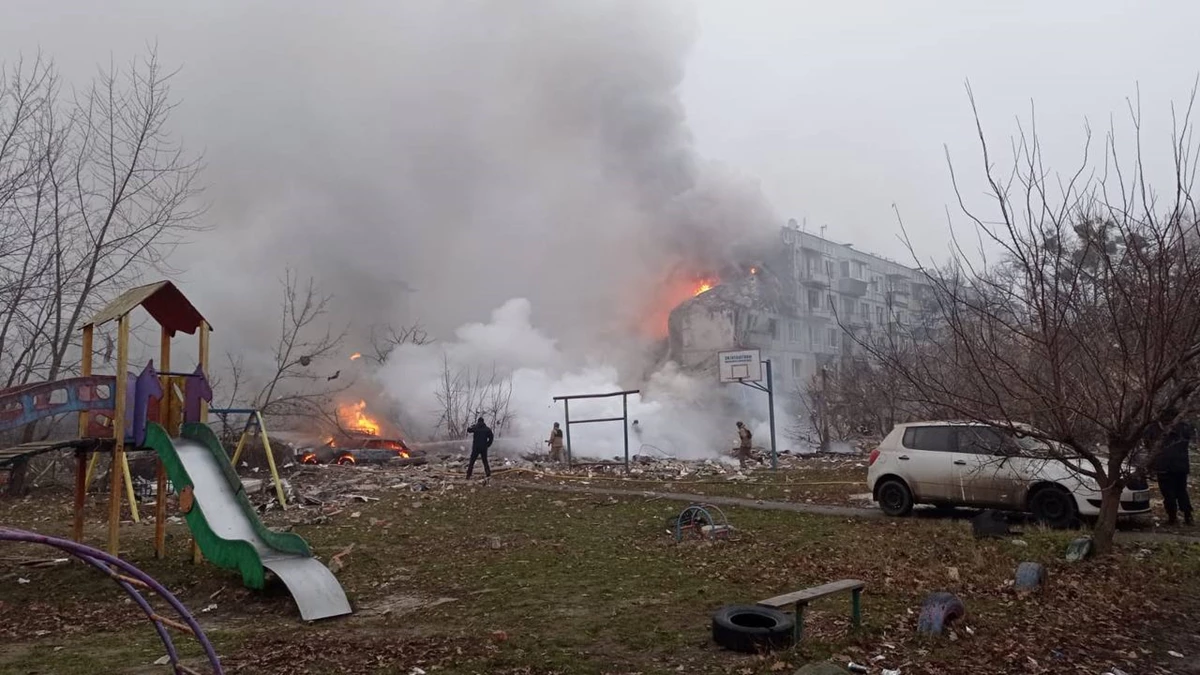
Residential building in Poltava after the attack

A Russian missile attack on a residential building in Poltava killed at least 14 people. Energy infrastructure in the city was struck in a separate attack. One person was killed in a Russian drone attack on Kharkiv, while three police officers were killed in a separate attack in Sumy Oblast.

One person was killed in a bombing near a military enlistment office in Rivne that was blamed on Russia by the SBU.

Russian forces claimed to have taken the village of Krymske, northeast of Toretsk.

An airstrike was launched on a boarding school in Sudzha, Kursk Oblast, killing four people according to Ukrainian authorities. Over 100 Russian civilians were "evacuated" by Ukraine to Sumy Oblast, making it the largest movement of civilians into Ukraine since the start of the incursion.

=== 2 February ===
Ukrainian drone attacks killed two persons in Belgorod Oblast, including one in the village of Malinovka, according to governor Vyacheslav Gladkov.

Sergey Yefremov, the deputy governor of Primorsky Krai and commander of the "Tigr" Battalion of the 155th Guards Naval Infantry Brigade, was killed in Kursk Oblast.

=== 3 February ===
Russian air defence claimed to have downed 70 drones over Volgograd, Rostov and Astrakhan Oblasts, targeting oil facilities in these regions. An oil refinery in Volgograd was set on fire. In Astrakhan, Governor Igor Babushkin confirmed that a "fire broke out" while Ukraine said it had targeted a gas processing plant there. No casualties were reported.

The Ukrainian military claimed to have inflicted significant losses during a strike by the Ukrainian Air Force on a Russian command post near Novoivanovka, Kursk Oblast.

Armen Sargsyan, founder of the Arbat Battalion that had fought in Ukraine, was killed along with a bodyguard by a bomb left in the lobby of the Aliye Parusa residential complex in Moscow.

The SBU arrested a man in Sarny, Rivne Oblast on suspicion of plotting to blow up a railway line on behalf of Russia.

Russian milbloggers claimed that Russian forces had taken the villages of Zelene Pole and Tarasivka near Pokrovsk.

Prominent Russian soldier and veteran of the Russo-Georgian War, Tasbolat Ibrashev was killed fighting in Vovchansk, Kharkiv Oblast. Ibrashev was famous in the Russian army for single-handedly stopping a Georgian military column in 2008.

=== 4 February ===
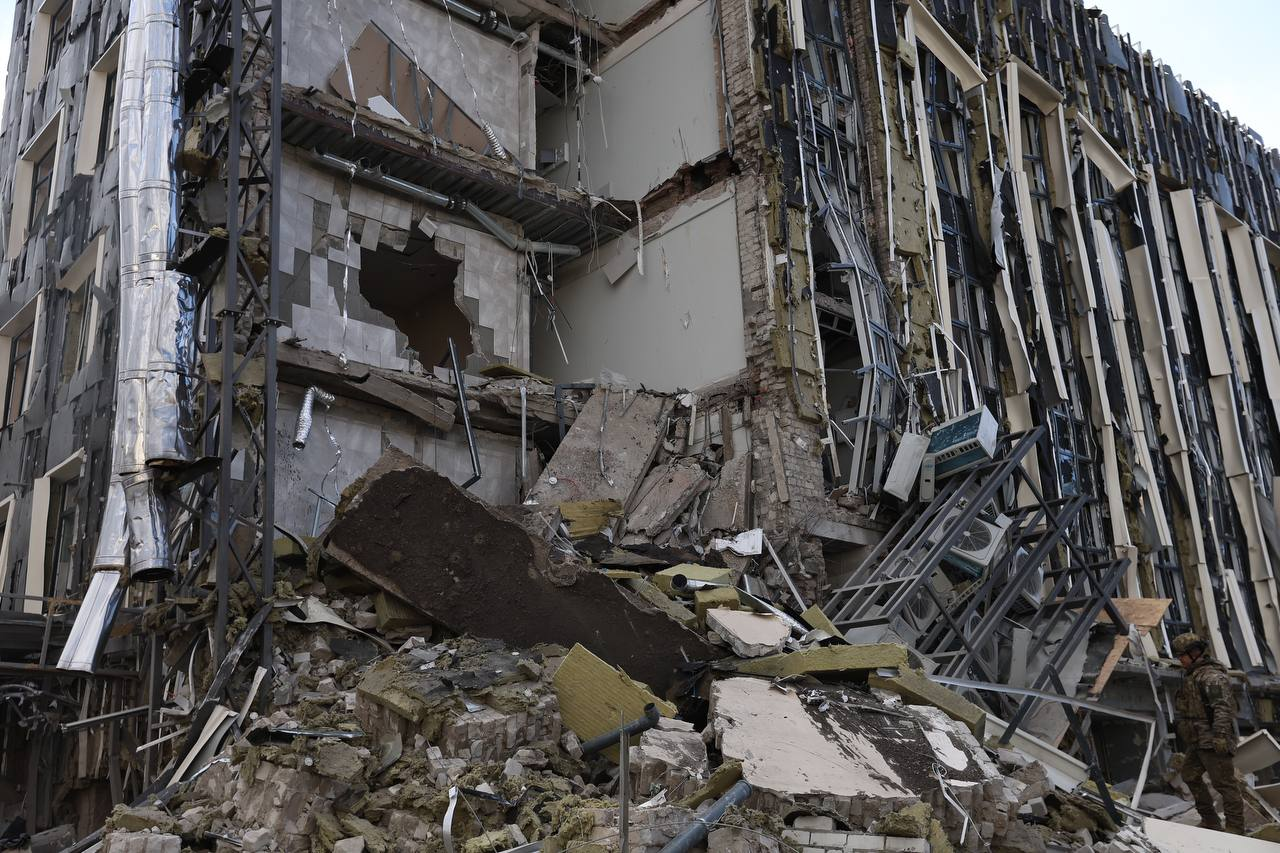
Administrative building in Izium after the strike

A Russian missile attack on Izium killed at least five people and injured at least 55 others.

Brigadier General Hennadii Shapovalov resigned as commander of the Ukrainian Operational Command South following his appointment as a liaison to the NATO military aid coordination center for Ukraine based in Germany.

Russian forces claimed to have taken the village of Sribne, Donetsk Oblast, south of Pokrovsk.

Zelenskyy said that 45,100 Ukrainian soldiers had been killed since the full-scale invasion by Russia, while 390,000 soldiers had been wounded. He also claimed that 300,000 to 350,000 Russian soldiers had been killed, 600,000 to 700,000 wounded and 50,000 to 70,000 missing in the war so far.

=== 5 February ===
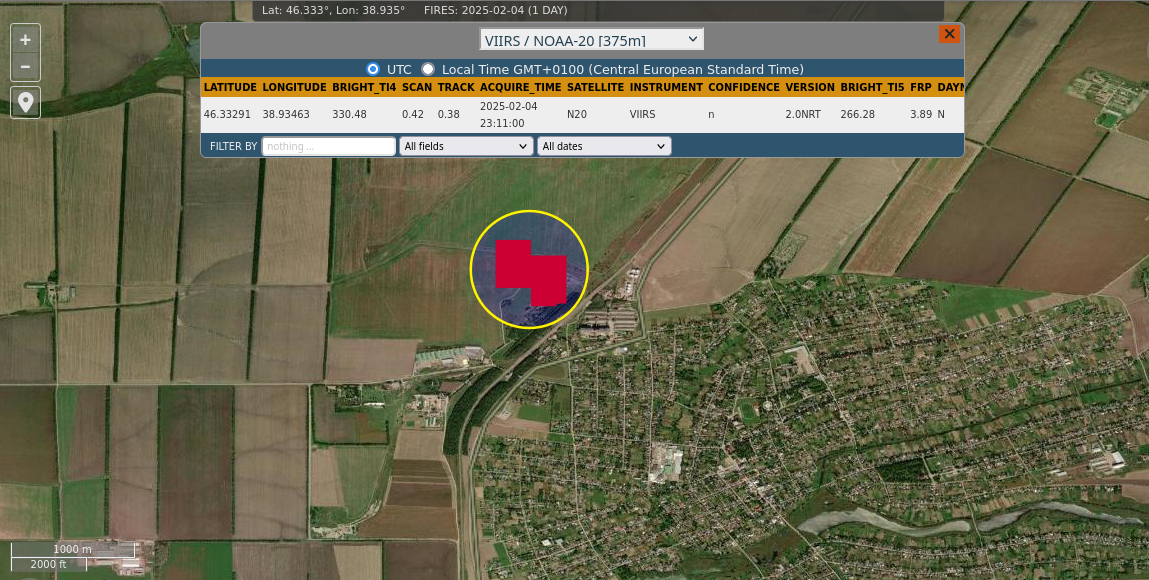
NASA's FIRMS detected fire at a Novominskaya refinery on 4 February 2025 23:11:00 (UTC)

The Russian governor of Krasnodar Krai claimed Ukrainian drones set fire to an oil storage tank at an oil depot, adding that the fire was quickly extinguished and no injuries reported. Russia claimed to have downed four drones overnight. Ukrainian drones struck a "mini-refinery" in the village of Novominskaya. A Buk-M3 was also reported damaged by Ukrainian drones in Zaporizhzhia Oblast.

The Russian defense ministry claimed that Russian forces had taken the village of Novomlynsk in northeastern Kharkiv Oblast and Baranivka, north of Ocheretyne. A Ukrainian military observer reported that Russian forces had taken the village of Zapadne in Kharkiv Oblast while a Russian source claimed that Russian forces had crossed the Oskil river near the village of Topoli.

Russia and Ukraine conducted a prisoner exchange mediated by the UAE that saw the release of 150 POWs held by each side.

Ukraine imposed sanctions on 57 ship captains involved in the illegal export of Russian oil to bypass price caps. It also imposed sanctions on 55 Russian officials and figures involved in illegal excavations and removal of artifacts from occupied areas of Ukraine, including officials of the Hermitage and Pushkin Museums.

=== 6 February ===
The governor of Belgorod Oblast claimed that three people were killed in a Ukrainian drone strike near the village of Logachevka.

The Ukrainian military claimed to have struck the Primorsko-Akhtarsk air base in Krasnodar Krai, causing a fire.

Russian forces captured the village of Dachne, west of Kurakhove, and Fyholivka, west of the Oskil River.

Ukrainian forces launched a new offensive in Kursk Oblast, capturing the settlements of Kolmakov and Fanaseyevka. Russia claimed to have repulsed the offensive southeast of Sudzha, in the villages of Ulanok and Cherkasskaya Konopelka. Russia claimed Ukrainian forces deployed "two mechanized battalions, tanks, and armored vehicles" in the attack.

The first Mirage 2000-5s fighter jets sent by France arrived in Ukraine, as well as another round of F-16s from the Netherlands.

Vadym Sukharevsky, commander of the Ukrainian Unmanned Systems Forces, said that the Ukrainian laser Tryzub (Trident) was being used operationally and "already striking certain targets at certain altitudes."

The Ukrainian Air Force confirmed a Russian KAB bomb was shot down over Zaporizhzhia Oblast, possibly with "experimental weapons".

=== 7 February ===
Three people were killed in a Russian airstrike on Myropillia, Sumy Oblast.

Russian forces claimed to have taken Toretsk, which the Ukrainian military denied.

President Zelenskyy said that North Korean troops had been redeployed to Kursk Oblast. Approximately 60,000 soldiers have currently been deployed against Ukrainian units in Kursk.

Two Russian Valdai radars used to intercept drones headed to Moscow were destroyed by the HUR using explosives near Dolgoprudny, Moscow Oblast.

=== 8 February ===
Russian forces claimed to have intercepted a Ukrainian drone over an oil refinery in Kumylzhensky District, Volgograd Oblast, and shot down a total of 36 drones over Krasnodar Krai and Rostov, Volgograd, and Belgorod Oblasts. Ukrainian officials said that drones were used to attack two military airfields, the Russian Southern Military District headquarters and S-400 missiles located in Rostov-on-Don.

Russian authorities were reported to have discovered a plot in which a shipment of FPV drone headsets loaded with explosives were sent to Russian soldiers. Each headset had 10-15 grams of explosives and were programmed to detonate on activation. Officials compared it to the 2024 Lebanon electronic device attacks by Israel. Subsequent reports claimed eight Russian FPV pilots lost their eyesight due to explosions between 4 and 7 February. The first explosion was reported on 4 February in Belgorod Oblast, subsequent explosions occurred in Kursk, Luhansk and Donetsk Oblasts.

Ukrainian forces claimed to have shot down a Russian Su-25 fighter jet using an Igla missile and damaged an Mi-8 helicopter sent to rescue the pilot in a drone strike, forcing it to retreat near Toretsk.

=== 9 February ===
Russian forces claimed to have taken the village of Orikhovo-Vasylivka, ten kilometers north of Chasiv Yar.

Russian forces claimed that 14 buildings were damaged in a drone attack on Rostov-on-Don.

=== 10 February ===
Russian forces claimed to have recaptured the settlement of Fanaseyevka in Kursk Oblast.

The Afipsky oil refinery in Krasnodar Krai was attacked by Ukrainian drones. A high-rise building in Krasnodar city was also damaged.

An F-16AM was spotted flying low over Ukraine. The F-16 was not equipped with air to air missiles but with a "full loadout" of Small Diameter Bombs. This is the first footage of a Ukrainian F-16 being used on a strike mission, instead of for air defence.

Russian forces set up netting over the road between Bakhmut and Chasiv Yar, installing a two-kilometer tunnel made up of poles with mesh netting being placed over the most vulnerable section of road to protect against drones.

=== 11 February ===
Ukrainian drones struck Saratov Oblast setting fire to the Saratov oil refinery, according to locals. Explosions were also reported around the perimeter of Engels-2 air base.

The Deputy Head of the Presidential Office of Ukraine Pavlo Palisa said that the Armed Forces of Ukraine would no longer create new Brigades.

=== 12 February ===
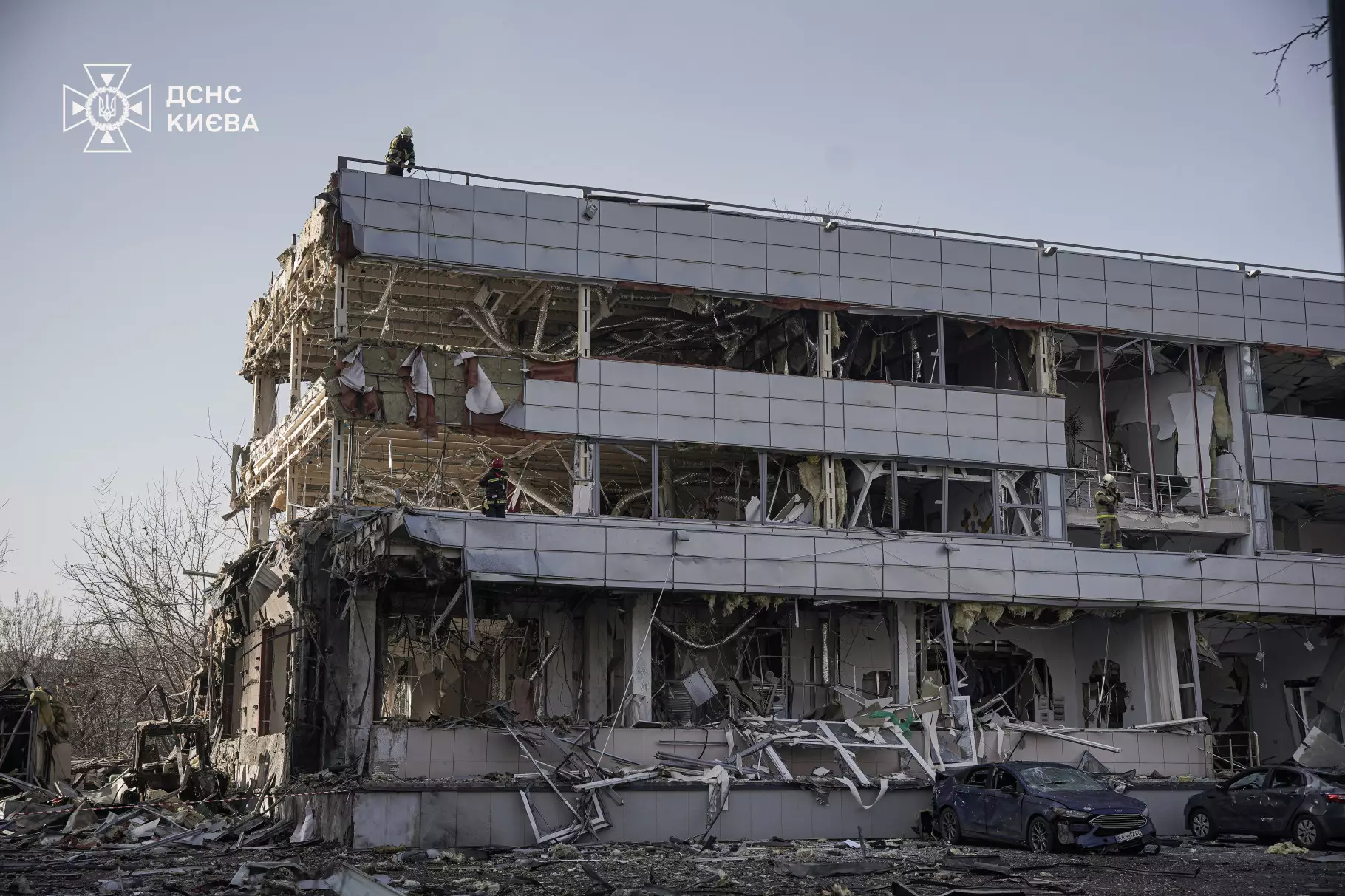
Office building in Kyiv after the attack

One person was killed in a Russian missile attack on Kyiv. Other strikes damaged infrastructure in the Holosiivskyi, Podilskyi, Sviatoshynskyi and Obolonskyi districts.

Five people were injured by Russian shelling on 13 villages in Sumy Oblast.

A Russian attack drone was intercepted by an APKWS-fired Vampire missile over Ukrainian airspace.

The Ukrainian 63rd Separate Mechanized Brigade claimed to have destroyed a Russian Smerch-2 anti-submarine rocket launcher in the Lyman sector of the Donetsk front.

SBU head Vasyl Malyuk announced that the chief of its counter-terrorism department, Col. Dmytro Kozyura had been arrested on suspicion of working for Russia since 2018.

US President Donald Trump said negotiations to end the Ukraine war will start immediately after holding a telephone call with Russian president Vladimir Putin.

Geo-located footage showed that Russian forces had taken the village of Makiivka in Luhansk Oblast.

=== 13 February ===
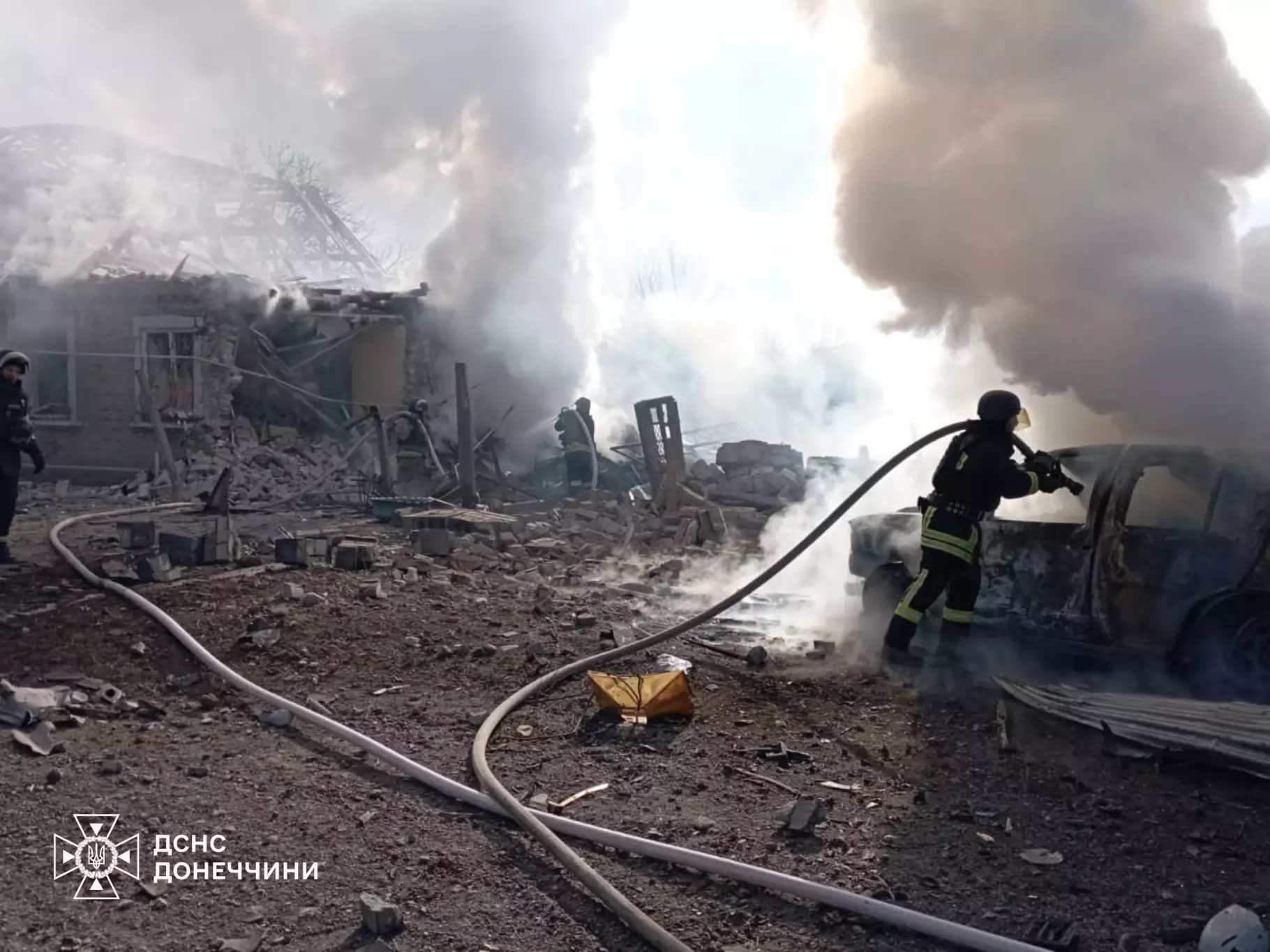
Destroyed house in Kramatorsk after an attack on 13 February

The Novolipetsk Steel mill in Lipetsk was targeted by Ukrainian drones in a "massive raid", according to the local governor Igor Artamonov. Drone debris damaged a power station injuring an employee and cutting power to several districts of Lipetsk city.

Two Russian drones believed to have been deployed in an attack on Reni crashed over the border in Moldova.

Zelenskyy imposed sanctions on multiple oligarchs and individuals including former president Petro Poroshenko, Viktor Medvedchuk, Kostyantyn Zhevago, Ihor Kolomoyskyi and Gennadiy Bogolyubov on suspicion of "high treason" and "assisting a terrorist organization", particularly their role in compromising national security through unfavorable business agreements with Russia.

Russian forces claimed to have taken the village of Berezivka, near Pokrovsk.

=== 14 February ===
The strike on Chernobyl New Safe Confinement

Zelenskyy said that a Russian drone attack significantly damaged the Chernobyl New Safe Confinement covering Reactor No. 4 of Chernobyl Nuclear Power Plant, which was installed following the 1986 disaster. Russia denied responsibility, while the International Atomic Energy Agency said that radiation levels at the site remained normal.

The governor of Belgorod Oblast claimed that one person was killed in a Ukrainian drone attack in Kukuyevka.

The remains of 757 Ukrainian soldiers killed in action were repatriated in an exchange which also saw the repatriation of the remains of 45 Russian soldiers.

The Organisation for the Prohibition of Chemical Weapons said that the prohibited CS gas was found in samples supplied to it by Ukraine from frontline areas.

The Ukrainian Air Force bombed a Russian drone base in the border village of Elizavetovka, Kursk Oblast.

The first Russian TOS-2 MLRS was destroyed by artillery fire in the "Pokrovsk region".

=== 15 February ===
Russian officials claimed that a drone strike in Kaluga Oblast caused a fire at an industrial facility in Dzerzhinsky District, while another series of drone strikes hit an oil refinery and an apartment building in Volgograd.

=== 16 February ===
Ukrainian forces claimed to have retaken the village of Pishchane near Pokrovsk.

Zelenskyy said that more than 46,000 Ukrainian soldiers had been killed and that nearly 380,000 others had been injured since the start of the Russian invasion in 2022.

The Czech-led artillery initiative delivered 1.6 million rounds of "large-caliber ammunition". Czech President Petr Pavel said Ukraine has "sufficient resources to cover Ukraine's need" until April 2025.

The Ukrainian 65th Mechanized Brigade claimed to have destroyed a Tor missile system and two Buk missile systems using drones during fighting in Zaporizhzhia Oblast over the course of one day.

Trump said he would allow European countries to buy US weapons on behalf of, or transfer them to, Ukraine.

=== 17 February ===
The governor of Krasnodar Krai claimed that one person was injured while 12 homes were damaged following a wave of Ukrainian drone attacks on the region. Russian forces claimed to have "neutralized" a Neptune-MD over the Sea of Azov and 90 drones across the Black Sea, Crimea, Krasnodar Krai and in Bryansk, Belgorod, Krasnodar, Rostov and Kursk Oblasts. The Ilya oil refinery was reported to be on fire after locals reported hearing explosions. A drone also hit the Kropotkinskaya pumping station in Krasnodar Krai, part of the Caspian Pipeline Consortium running from Kazakhstan to Novorossiysk. According to an official the attack had reduced the flow through the pipeline which will affect Chevron and Exxon. The operator stopped the pipeline while damage was investigated. They claimed seven drones were involved but an unclear number struck the pipeline.

The Russian defense ministry claimed that Russian forces retook the village of Sverdlikovo in Kursk Oblast. Russian sources claimed that Russian forces captured the village of Novosilka in southern Donetsk Oblast.

Over 10,000 Ukrainians, aged 18 to 24, have applied to join the Ukrainian military according to a spokesperson for the Ukrainian MoD. The "special contracts" contain free higher education, interest free mortgages and an annual salary of Hr 1 million ($24,000).

The Ukrainian 156th Mechanized Brigade received some 100 BTR-60s from Bulgaria which had been overhauled and modernised with new engines, radios, optics and anti-drone netting.

=== 18 February ===
The Russian defense ministry claimed that Russian forces had retaken the village of Yampolivka, near Terny.

In Donetsk, Ukrainian drones destroyed a S-350 missile system, believed to be the third of the war so far destroyed. Only six are known to be in service.

Russia and the United States began official discussions in Saudi Arabia on ending the war in Ukraine.

The HUR said a new turbofan jet-powered Shahed-238, called Geran-3 by the Russians and with a range of over 2,500 kilometers and a maximum speed of 600 km/h is in production.

=== 19 February ===
Drones struck the Syzran oil refinery in Samara Oblast. Locals reported three explosions and the governor, Vyacheslav Fedorishchev, confirmed a fire broke out at the refinery without casualties.

The Ukrainian military said that it had destroyed a North Korean-built M-1978 Koksan artillery system for the first time.

The Romanian parliament passed a bill allowing its military to shoot down Russian drones entering Romanian airspace from Ukraine after Romanian military units were unable to do so due to Romania and Russia not being at war.

Putin said that Russian forces had crossed the international border into Ukraine's Sumy Oblast, which was denied by Ukraine.

Zelenskyy said that Ukraine was "running dangerously low" of Patriot missiles. Citing a call with a "field commander", Zelenskyy is seeking a licence to build Patriot missiles in Ukraine and an additional 20 Patriot systems.

=== 20 February ===
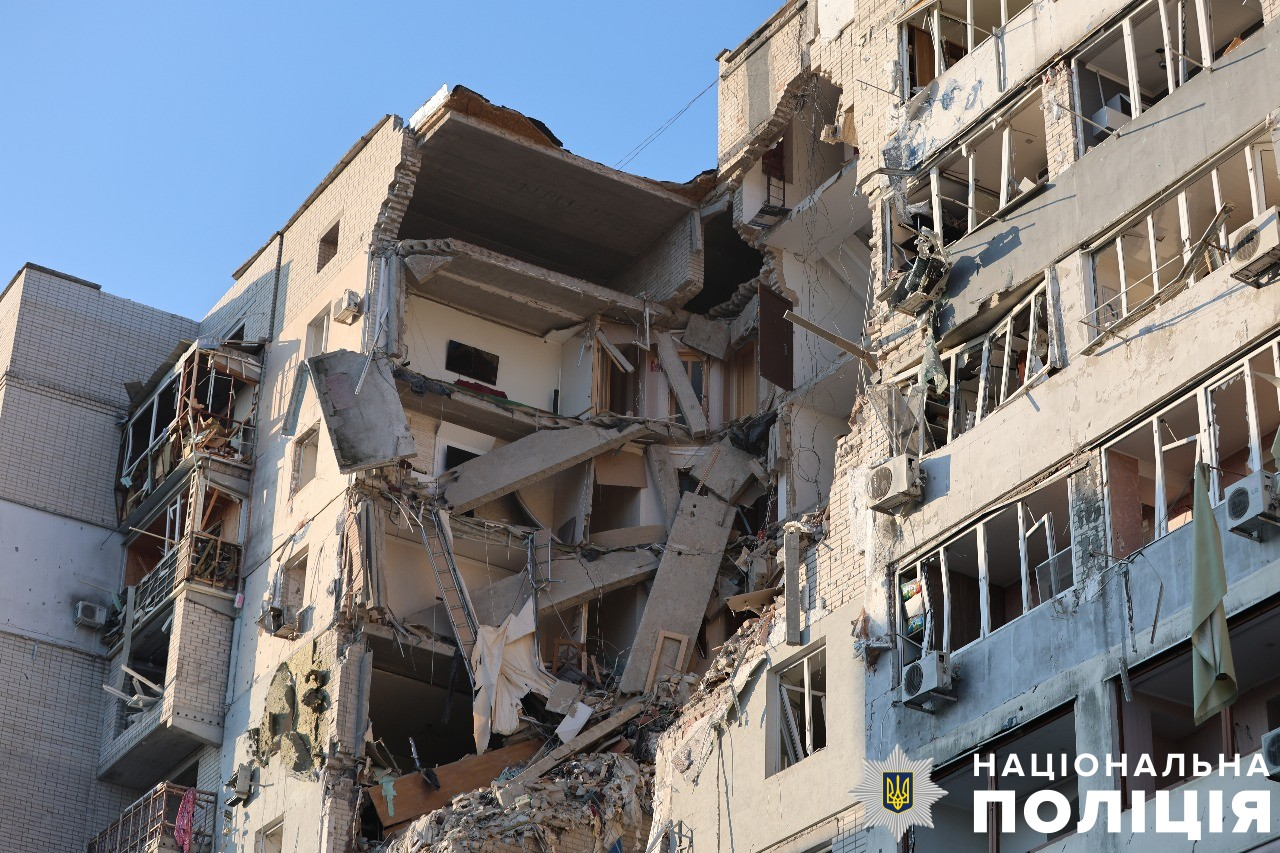
Residential building in Kherson after bombing on 20 February

The FSB claimed to have killed an alleged Ukrainian operative accused of plotting to assassinate an unidentified official in Saratov Oblast.

The HUR claimed that an explosion in Russian-occupied Berdiansk killed the deputy head of the city administration, Yevgeny Bogdanov.

Russian forces captured the village of Novoocheretuvate, northwest of Velyka Novosilka.

An electrical substation that powered the Novovelichkovskaya oil pumping station in Krasnodar Krai was attacked by SBU drones, causing a fire and a shutdown of the refinery.

Two people were killed in a Russian bombing of Kherson.

=== 21 February ===
Russia claimed to have taken the village of Nadiivka in Donetsk Oblast, located ten kilometers from the border with Dnipropetrovsk Oblast.

Russian forces seized the village of Ulakly following the closure of the pocket west of Kurakhove.

Geolocated footage confirmed the Russian recapture of Fanaseyevka in Kursk Oblast. Russian milbloggers claimed that Cherkasskaya Konopelka had been recaptured.

=== 22 February ===
One person was killed in a Russian drone strike in Kyiv Oblast. Two others were killed in Russian airstrikes in Kostiantynivka.

Russian sources claimed that Topoli in Kharkiv Oblast had been recaptured. Russia claimed to have recaptured the village of Novoliubivka near the Zherebets River in Luhansk Oblast.

=== 23 February ===
Russia launched its largest single drone attack on Ukraine for the war, with Ukrainian Air Force Command spokesman Yurii Ihnat counting 267 drones and claiming that 138 of them had been intercepted. Two people were killed in Kherson, while a third person died in a missile attack in Kryvyi Rih.

Russian forces recaptured the settlement of Bilohorivka in Luhansk Oblast.

=== 24 February ===
Two people were killed in Russian airstrikes in Sumy Oblast.

The Ukrainian military claimed to have set fire on the Ryazan oil refinery following a drone strike. The local governor Pavel Malkov confirmed falling debris set fire to an "industrial facility in the region".

An Italian defence analyst identified Italian-made B1 Centauro tank destroyers headed to Ukraine in a convoy, however the Italian government is yet to confirm their delivery.

=== 25 February ===
One person was killed in a Russian attack on Kramatorsk.

The Ukrainian military claimed to have repelled a Russian attack near the village of Novenke in Sumy Oblast.

Ukrainian forces destroyed a S-300VM missile system in Zaporizhzhia Oblast using a bomber drone.

Ireland donated four Giraffe Mk IVs in its first delivery of military equipment to Ukraine.

Geolocated footage confirmed that Russian forces had captured Andriivka in Donetsk Oblast.

=== 26 February ===
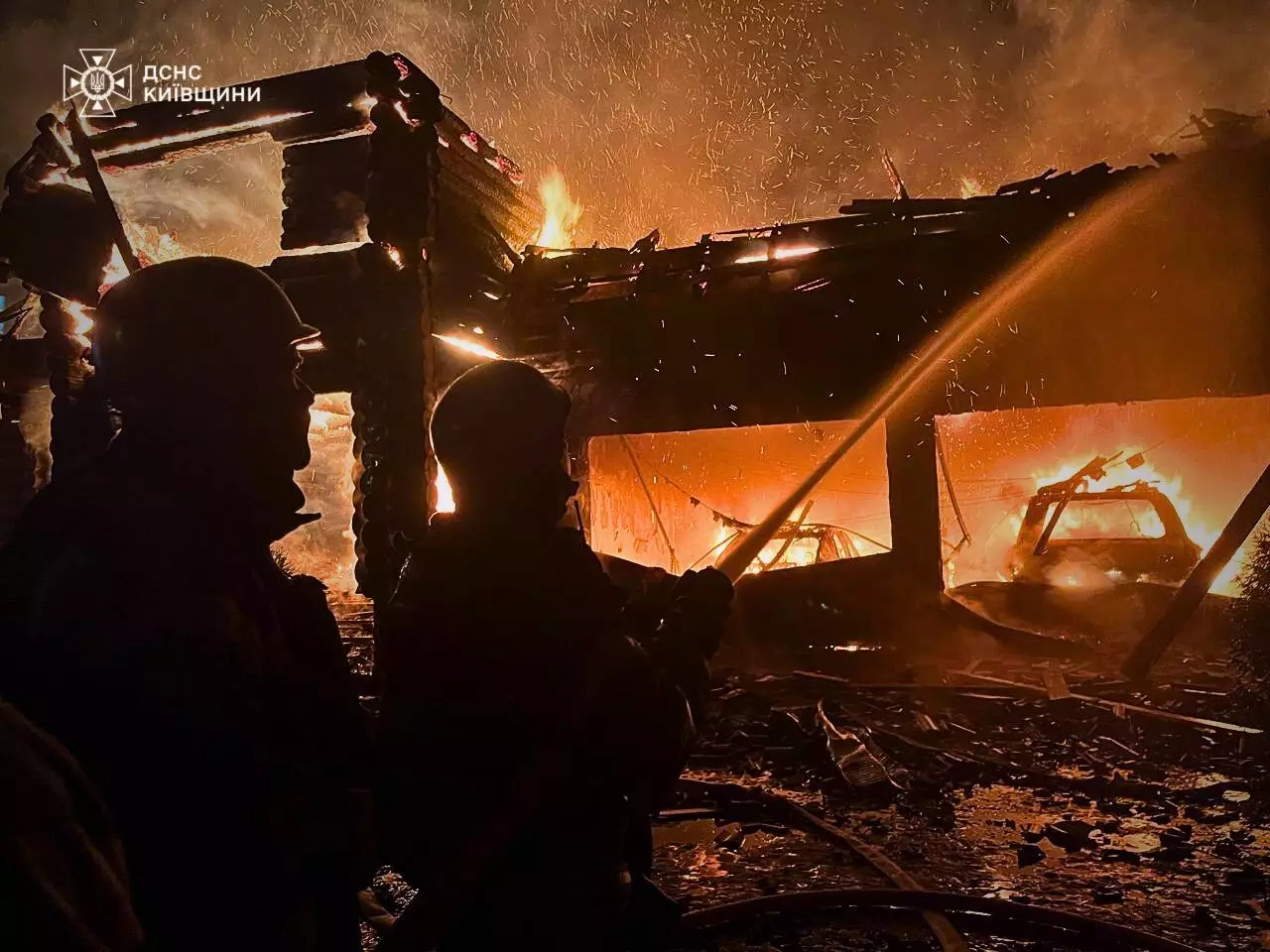
Burning house in Kriukivshchyna after the attack

Ukrinform journalist Tetiana Kulyk was killed along with her husband in a Russian drone strike on their residence in Kriukivshchyna, Kyiv Oblast. Five others were killed and 11 people were injured in separate attacks in Kostiantynivka.

Ukrainian forces claimed to have retaken Kotlyne, near Pokrovsk.

Russian officials claimed that 128 drones were shot down over Crimea, the Sea of Azov, the Black Sea, Krasnodar Krai and in Bryansk and Kursk Oblasts. Sochi Airport suspended flights, explosions were reported in Anapa and the governor of Krasnodar Krai, Veniamin Kondratyev, reported three private homes were damaged across the area. In Crimea explosions were reported in Kerch, where the Crimean Bridge was temporarily closed to traffic. Local partisans reported Russian military personnel were trying to avoid reporting for duty due to ongoing drone attacks. The Ukrainian military claimed that it had targeted Saky and Kacha air bases in Crimea as well as the port of Tuapse in Krasnodar Krai.

The Russian defense ministry claimed that Russian forces had retaken the settlements of Pogrebki and Orlovla in Kursk Oblast.

The Ukrainian Air Force struck a Russian drone command post attached to the 19th Motor Rifle Division in Zaporizhzhia Oblast. A Russian command post attached to the 14th Army Corps in Ivanivka, Kherson Oblast, was struck by an HUR bomber drone.

=== 27 February ===
Russian officials claimed that one person was killed in a drone strike in Belgorod Oblast.

South Korean intelligence claimed that North Korea is sending an unspecified number of additional soldiers to fight in Kursk Oblast, alongside Russian forces.

Syrskyi visited Novopavlivka, in Donetsk Oblast. He claimed the Russian advance had been slowed and Ukrainian forces had "regrouped". Russian forces are in places 4.5 km (2.8 miles) from Dnipropetrovsk Oblast.

Russian forces claimed to have retaken the settlements of Nikolskiy and Novaya Sorochina north and northwest of Sudzha.

Geolocated footage confirmed that Russian forces had captured the village of Skudne, north of Velyka Novosilka and the village of Zaporizhzhia, southwest of Pokrovsk.

Dozens of Ukrainian drones struck a Russian ammunition dump in Kurchatov, Kursk Oblast according to unofficial sources. A fire and secondary detonations were reported. The Russian defense ministry said that 22 drones were shot down over Krasnodar Krai and Oryol, Kursk, Bryansk, and Smolensk Oblasts.

=== 28 February ===
The Ukrainian military claimed to have destroyed a Russian thermobaric munitions depot near Selydove, Donetsk Oblast.

The FSB arrested two church officials on suspicion of trying to kill a Russian Orthodox bishop, Tikhon Shevkunov, who is close to Putin. The HUR denied the accusations saying they were "absurd" and "lies".

Russian forces launched nine drone strikes in the Kyivskyi, Shevchenkivskyi and Kholodnohirskyi Districts of Kharkiv, damaging a medical facility and civilian infrastructure and injuring seven people.

A car bomb seriously wounded a Russian FSB officer in Mariupol.

Kongsberg announced that it was working on integrating Ukrainian missiles into a NASAMS launcher. A joint venture involving the production of Ukrainian missiles is also being discussed.

== March 2025 ==
=== 1 March ===
Russian forces captured the village of Burlatske, near Velyka Novosilka.

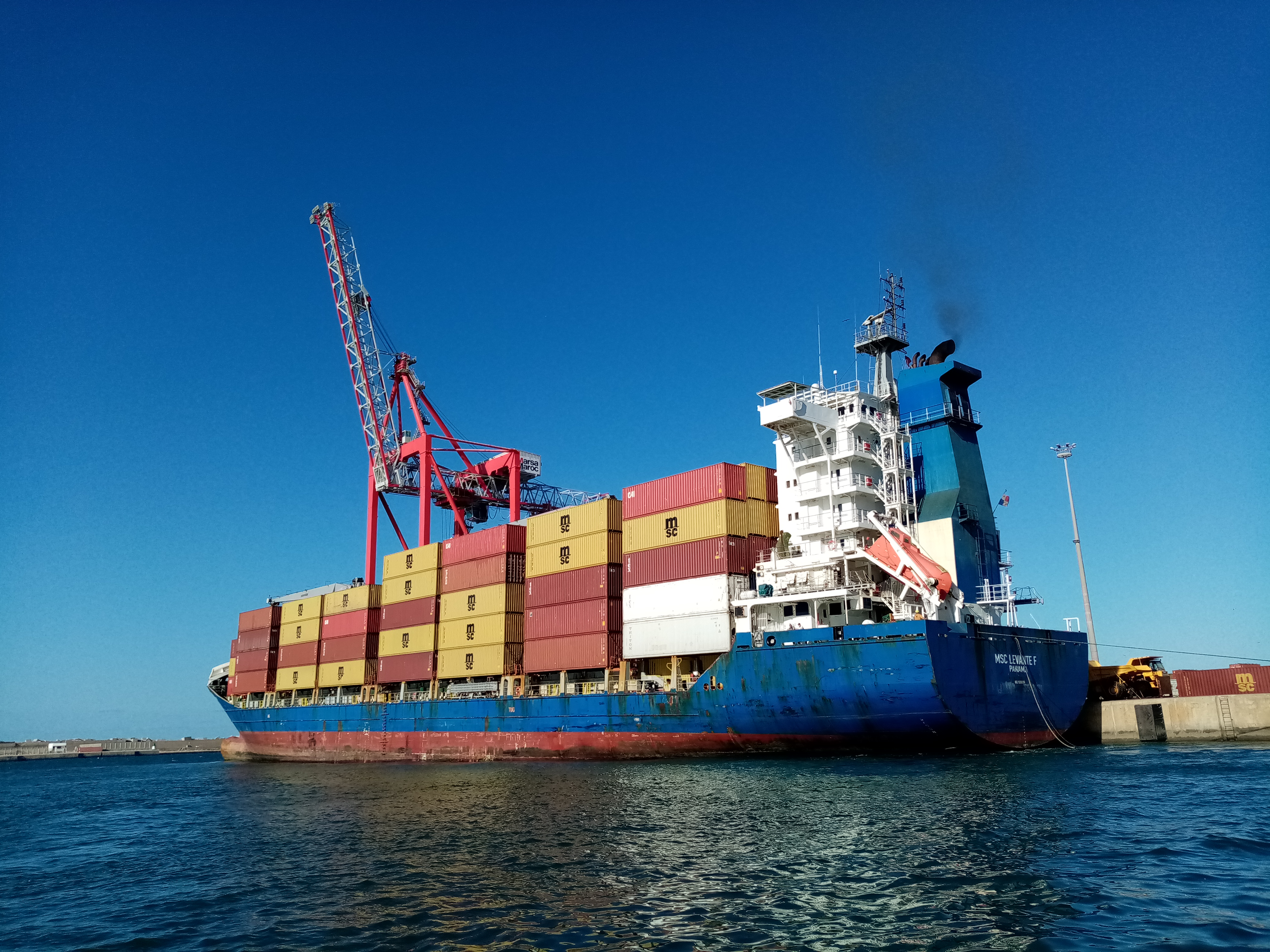
The MSC Levante F in 2022.

One person was killed in a Russian drone strike in Odesa Oblast. In the evening, a ballistic missile attack was made on the port of Odesa, injuring two port employees and damaging the Swiss-owned and Panamanian-flagged cargo vessel MSC Levante F.

Ukrainian forces were attacked with a Russian Iskander-M ballistic missile at a training ground in Cherkaske, Dnipropetrovsk Oblast, resulting in an unspecified number of casualties.

=== 2 March ===
One person was killed in a Russian drone strike in Kherson.

Russian forces claimed to have taken the village of Zhuravka after crossing into Sumy Oblast. Russian forces also claimed to have taken the village of Pryvline, northwest of Velyka Novosilka.

British prime minister Keir Starmer announced a £1.6 billion agreement allowing Ukraine to purchase over 5,000 Lightweight Multirole Missiles.

Czech citizens raised 70 million koruna ($3 million) to purchase an UH-60 Blackhawk helicopter for Ukraine.

=== 3 March ===
The Ufimsky refinery plant in Ufa was set on fire by Ukrainian drones.

Kongsberg Gruppen announced a plan to build hundreds of NASAMS missiles in Ukraine.

The US government suspended all military aid to Ukraine, including what was approved under President Biden.

=== 4 March ===
Drones struck an oil refinery in Syzran, Samara Oblast. Locals reported explosions and a fire. Further attacks were reported in Rostov Oblast with an "industrial complex" and oil pipeline in the village of Sokhranovka being set on fire by drones, according to the regional governor Yury Slyusar.

The Ukrainian military claimed to have killed 30 Russian soldiers in an airstrike on a military facility near Troitskoye, Kursk Oblast.

Russian forces claimed to have captured the town of Kurilovka, southwest of Sudzha.

A S-400 missile system in Crimea caught fire in unknown circumstances, engulfing its antenna.

=== 5 March ===
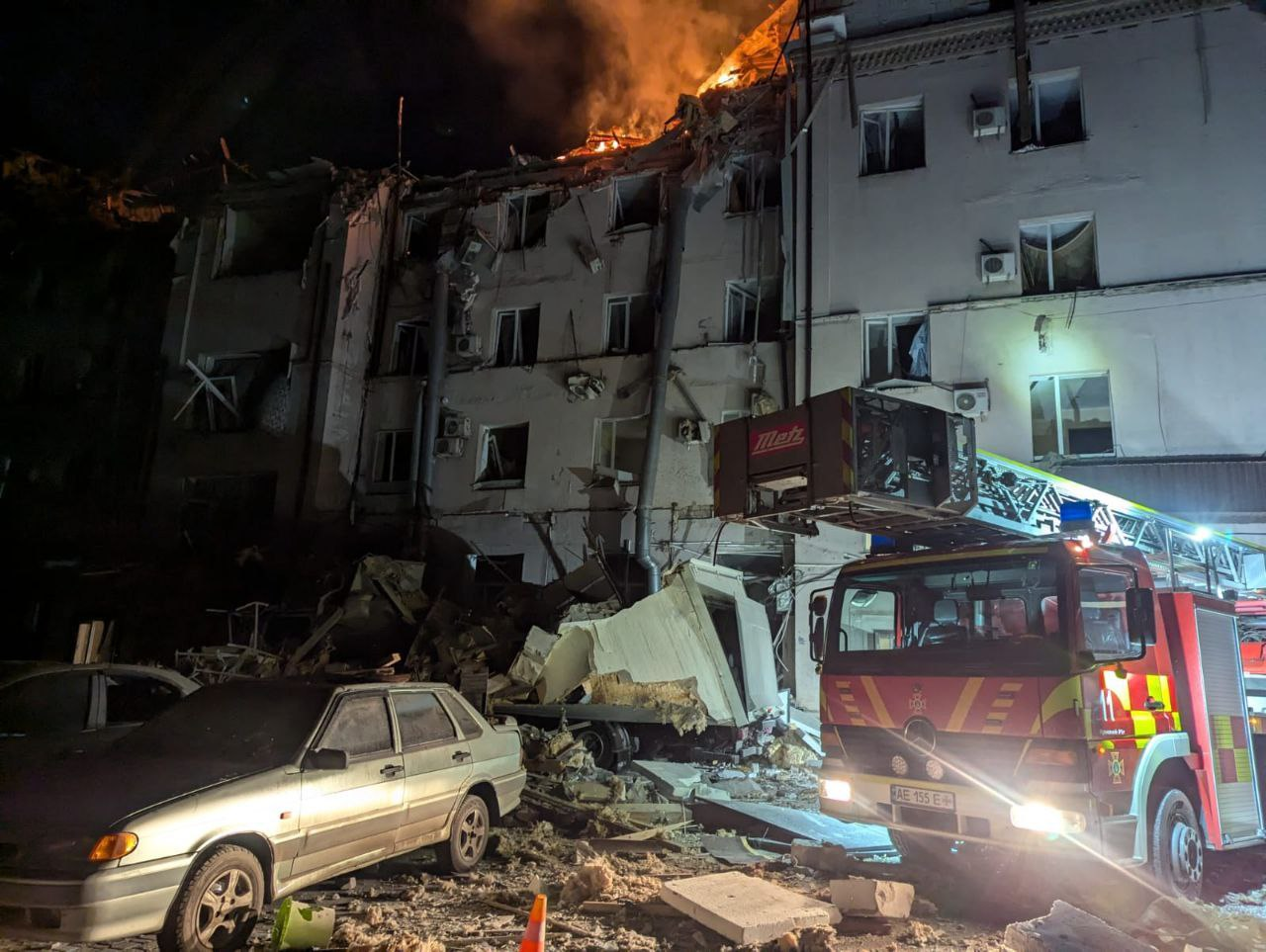
Destroyed hotel in Kryvyi Rih

Five people were killed in a Russian missile attack on Kryvyi Rih.

The Ukrainian military said it carried out an airstrike on the command post of the 17th Tank Regiment of the Russian 70th Motorized Rifle Division in Oleshky, Kherson Oblast.

CIA Director John Ratcliffe confirmed that the US paused intelligence sharing with Ukraine.

Russian forces claimed to have crossed the international border into Kharkiv Oblast and captured the Nekhoteyevka international border crossing checkpoint east of Kozacha Lopan.

=== 6 March ===
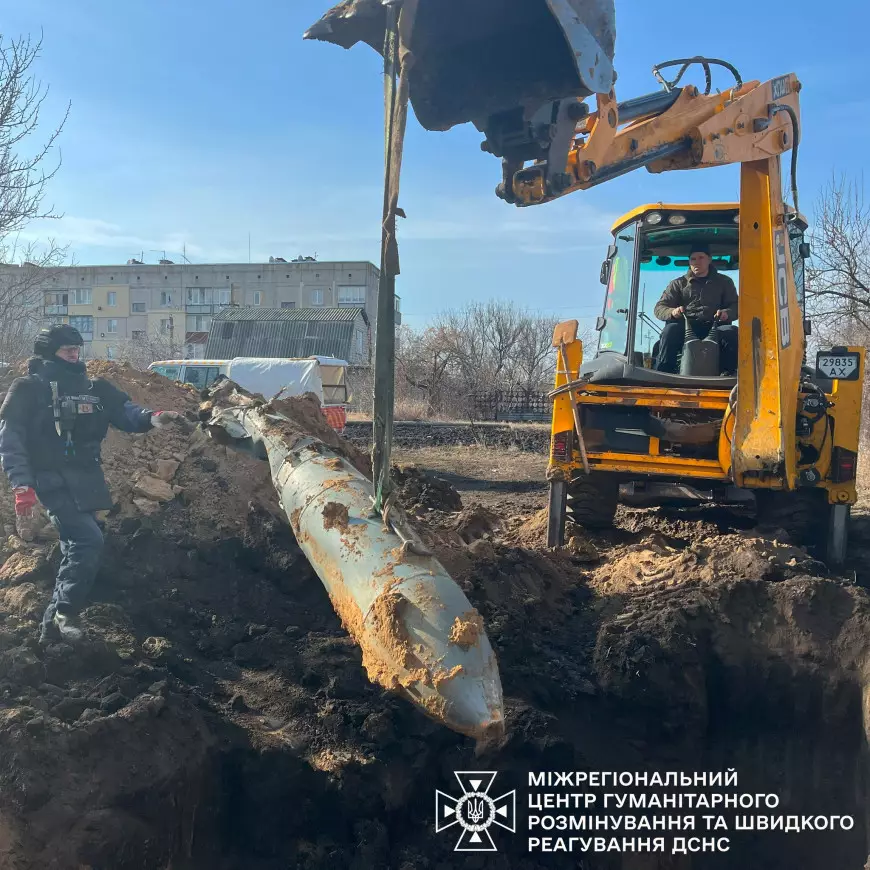
Disposal of Russian air-dropped bomb FAB-500 in Slatyne (Kharkiv Oblast)

Norway announced that it would increase its military aid to Ukraine from $3.2 billion in 2024 to $7.7 billion for 2025.

=== 7 March ===
Maxar Technologies stopped supplying the Ukrainian government with satellite images after a request from the US Executive Office.

Mirage 2000 fighter jets sent by France to Ukraine were used in combat against Russian air attacks for the first time.

Russian forces made a breakthrough south of Sudzha threatening to encircle Ukrainian units in the area and were also advancing in the villages of Zhuravka and Novenke. Russian forces also recaptured the town of Staraya Sorochina.

Ukraine received $1 billion from the British government, the first payment of money to Ukraine secured from the profits from seized Russian assets.

Russian forces carried out a missile and drone attack on Ukrainian energy infrastructure.

Major General and commander of Ukraine's Operational Command North, Dmytro Krasylnykov told Ukrainian media outlet Suspilne that he was dismissed from his post for "unclear reasons".

=== 8 March ===
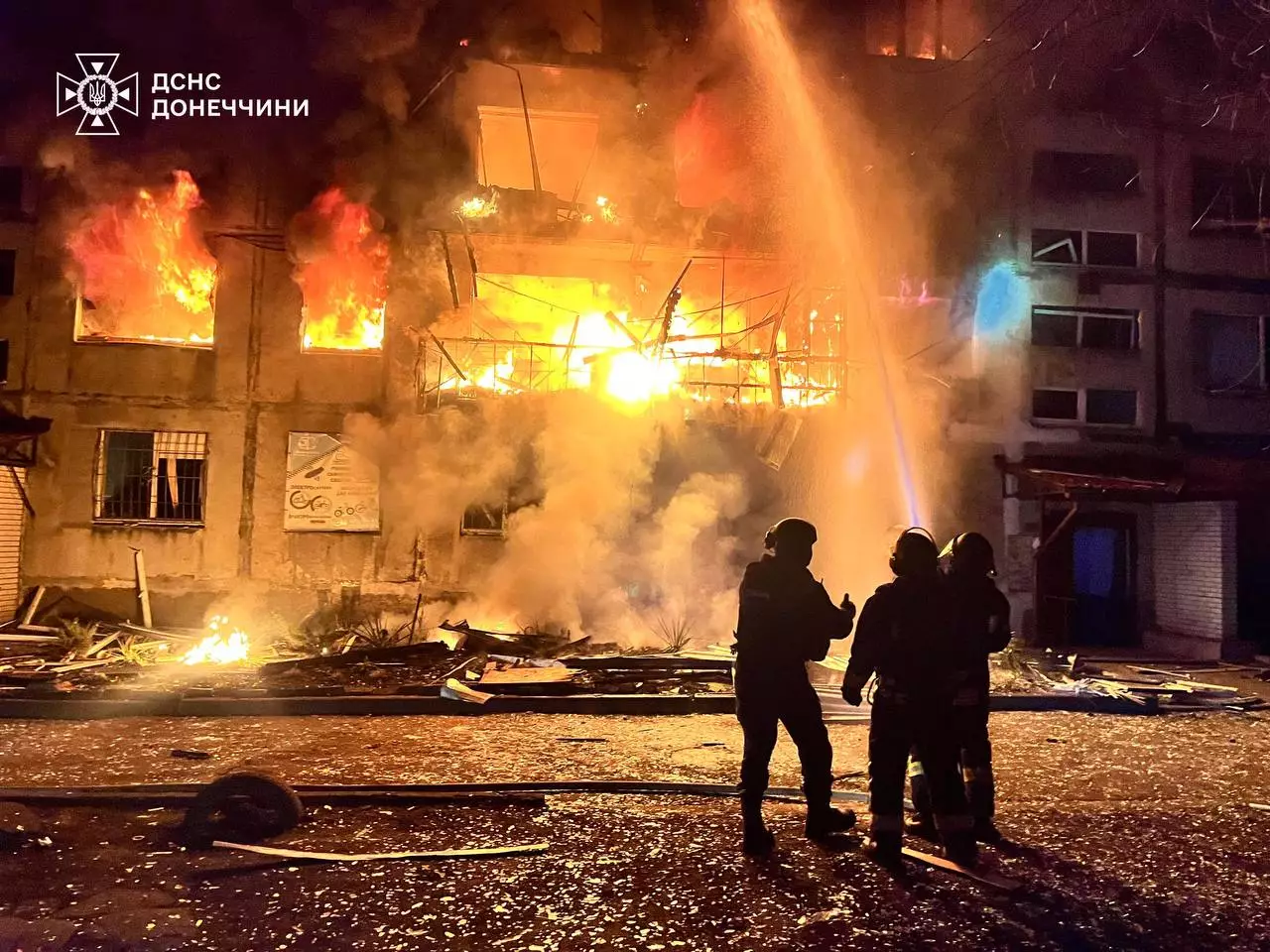
Building in Dobropillia after the attack

Eleven people were killed in a Russian attack on Dobropillia, Donetsk Oblast, while three others were killed in a drone attack in Bohodukhiv, Kharkiv Oblast.

The Kirishi oil refinery in Leningrad Oblast was struck by falling drone debris, damaging a storage tank according to governor Aleksandr Drozdenko.

In Kursk Oblast, geolocated footage showed that Russian forces had recaptured the settlements of Cherkasskoye Porechnoye and Lebedevka, while Russian forces further claimed to have retaken the settlements of Kubatkin, Viktorovka, Martynovka and Nikolayevka. Geolocated footage also confirmed Russian control over Novenke in Sumy Oblast.

Russian forces claimed to have taken the village of Kostiantynopil in Donetsk Oblast.

=== 9 March ===
Atesh said it burned down a relay cabinet near Stolbove, Crimea, that services a railway connecting Crimea and Zaporizhzhia Oblast.

Ukrainian drones hit an oil refinery in Chuvashia in the first such attack in the Russian autonomous republic.

Geolocated footage showed that Russian forces had captured the settlements of Malaya Loknya and Novaya Sorochina in Kursk Oblast, as well as Kostyantynopil in Donetsk Oblast.

=== 10 March ===
Ukrainian drones struck the Novokuybyshevsk oil refinery in Samara Oblast. Locals reported several explosions in the city.

The SBU arrested a resident of Kharkiv on suspicion of plotting attacks on soldiers on behalf of Russia.

Russian forces claimed to have taken the towns of Bogdanovka, Mirny and Kolmakov in Kursk Oblast.

=== 11 March ===
Moscow Mayor Sergey Sobyanin claimed Russian air defences shot down 69 drones over Moscow. Flights from Domodedovo and Zhukovsky airports were restricted. Three people were killed and 20 were injured. Sobyanin said it was the "most massive" attack on Moscow. Several high rise buildings were damaged by falling debris and over 20 cars were destroyed by a fire in a parking lot. The Ukrainian general staff claimed to have targeted various oil refinery and pipelines in Moscow and Oryol. Russian air defense further reported to have shot down 337 drones in other regions, including 91 over Moscow Oblast, 126 over Kursk Oblast, and 38 over Bryansk Oblast.

Russian forces recaptured the towns of Bondarevka, Zamostye, Makhnovka, Kazachya Loknya, Knyazhiy 2 and Knyazhiy 1 in Kursk Oblast. Russian millbloggers further claimed that Russian forces took the towns of Kolmakov and Dmitryukov.

Four Syrian nationals were killed in a Russian missile strike that damaged the cargo ship MJ Pinjar while it was loading grain at the port of Odesa for delivery to Algeria.

Russian forces captured a fully intact Ukrainian M1A1 Abrams tank in Kursk Oblast.

The SBU accused Russian intelligence of recruiting two teenagers to carry out bomb attacks in Ivano-Frankivsk that killed one of the teenagers and injured the other along with two bystanders.

=== 12 March ===
The governor of Kursk Oblast claimed that four people were killed in a Ukrainian attack on a feed mill in Kozyrevka. The governors of Rostov and Voronezh Oblast claimed that infrastructure facilities were set on fire by drone attacks.

After talks between US and Ukrainian officials in Jeddah, Saudi Arabia, the US restarted military aid to Ukraine as well as intelligence support. Maxar also confirmed that it had restored Ukrainian access to its satellite images.

According to DeepState's map, Ukrainian forces lost control of Sudzha in Kursk Oblast. Russian forces also captured Dniproenerhiia in Donetsk Oblast.

The Ukrainian 43rd Separate Artillery Brigade claimed to have destroyed a Russian S-400 battery in an undisclosed location.

The Ukrainian Air Force stated that the SAMP/T downed a Russian Sukhoi military aircraft without providing further details.

=== 13 March ===
Russia claimed that its air defences shot down 77 drones, while its operation to retake Kursk Oblast entered its last phase.

Russian forces claimed to have captured and cleared the towns of Sudzha, Podol, Goncharovka, Zaoleshenka, Rubanshchina and Molovoi in Kursk Oblast.

HUR drones struck a Russian drone factory in Obukhovo, Kaluga Oblast. Explosions and a fire were reported at an industrial site.

The Defence Council of Sumy Oblast announced a mandatory evacuation from eight settlements in Yunakivka and Myropillia hromadas of Sumy Raion.

The former leader of the Right Sector's Odesa Branch, Demyan Hanul, was assassinated in Odesa.

The US started resupplying Ukraine with GLSDBs due to a shortage of ATACMS missiles.

It was reported that a captured Crimean Tatar, who fought in the Ukrainian Army, died in a Russian penal colony in Dimitrovgrad, Russia.

=== 14 March ===
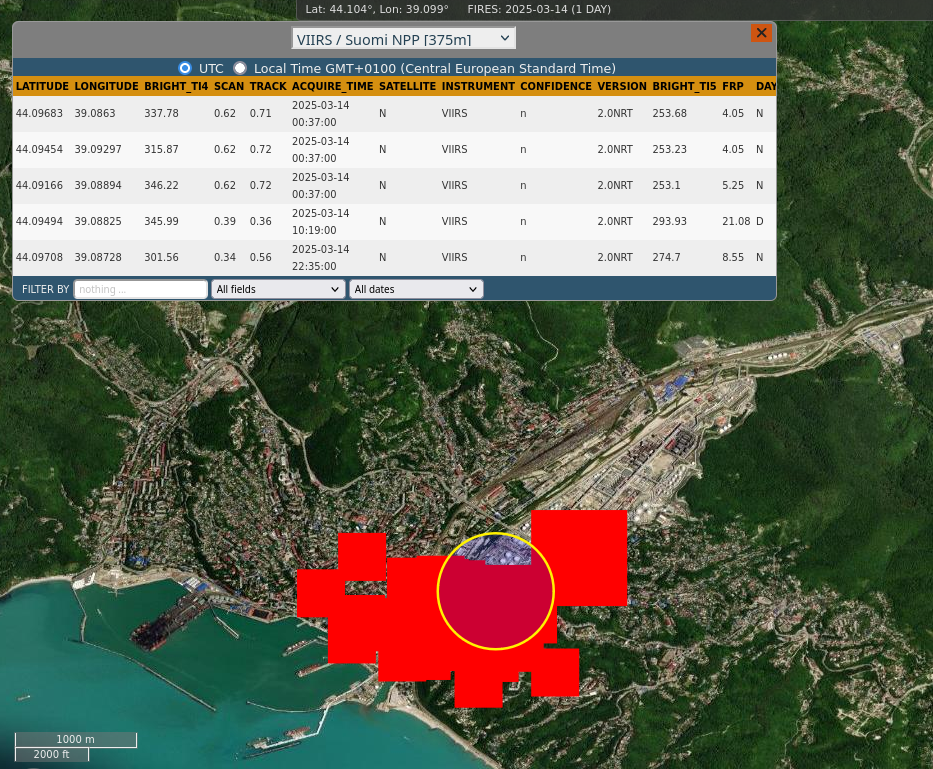
The Tuapse Refinery fire was detected by NASA's FIRMS

The governor of Krasnodar Krai stated that the Tuapse Refinery was struck by Ukrainian drones, causing a 1,000 square meter fire that took until 17 March to extinguish. The mayor of Moscow claimed that four drones were shot down in a separate attack near the capital. The attack was believed to have been conducted by a R-360 Neptune missile.

Yan Petrovsky, and former commander of the Russian paramilitary Rusich Group who was arrested in Finland in 2023, was sentenced by a court in Helsinki to life imprisonment for war crimes committed in Ukraine.

Russian forces likely captured the town of Goncharovka in Kursk Oblast.

=== 15 March ===
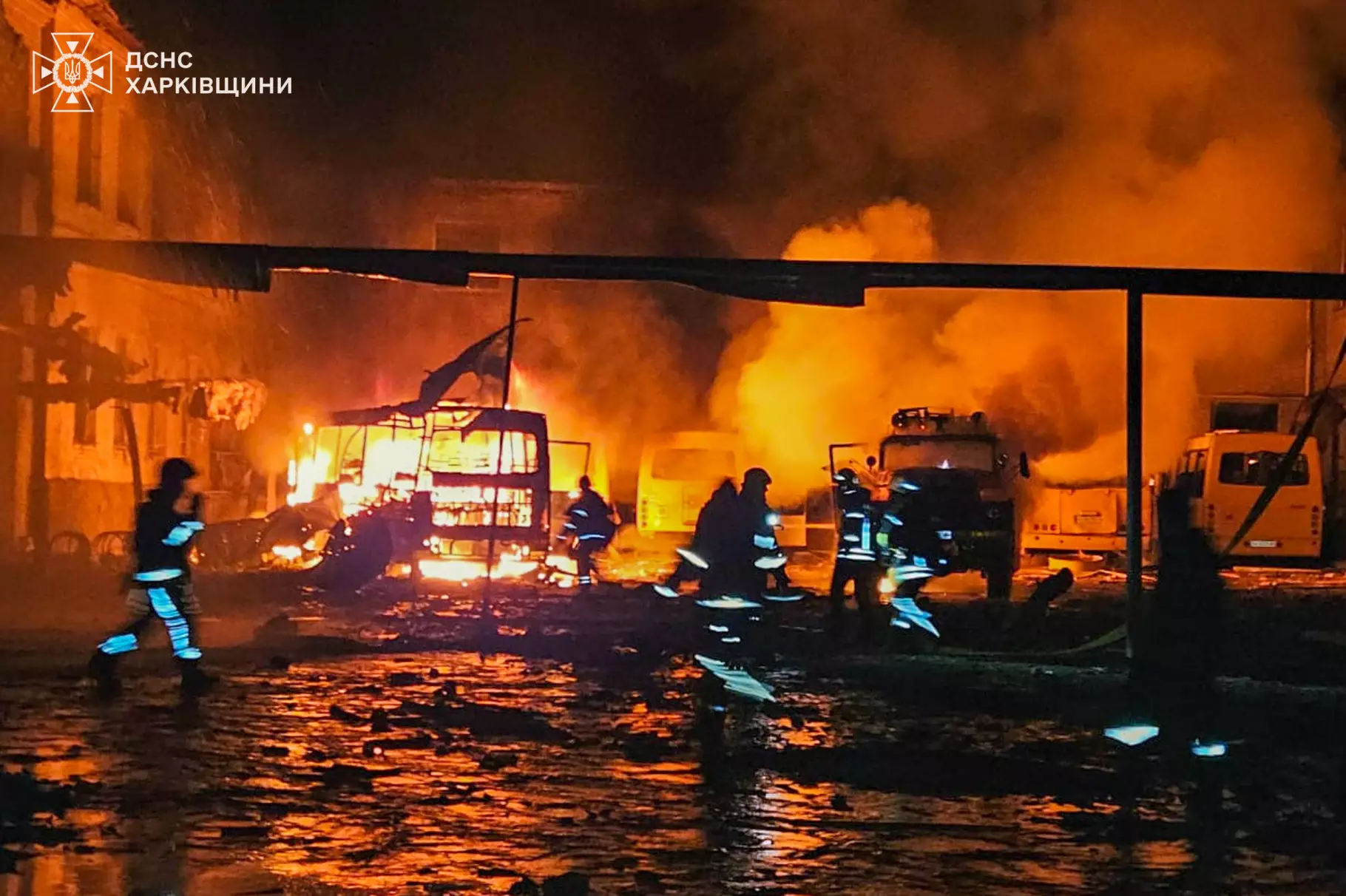
Lyceum in Bohodukhiv (Kharkiv Oblast) after drone attack on 15 March

Ukraine said that it downed 130 drones launched by Russia in overnight strikes, while Russia claimed that it intercepted 126 drones fired by Ukraine.

One person was killed in a Russian attack on Nikopol.

Russian forces claimed to have taken the village of Stepove in Zaporizhzhia Oblast.

The Russian MoD claimed to have shot down a Ukrainian MiG-29.

Ukraine claimed that Aster-30 missiles for SAMP/T are at a "critical low" and the two batteries they operate will soon become "inoperable".

=== 16 March ===
Andriy Hnatov was appointed as Chief of General Staff of the Ukrainian Armed Forces, replacing Anatoliy Barhylevych.

=== 17 March ===
Russian forces claimed to have taken the villages of Mali Shcherbaky and Shcherbaky in Zaporizhzhia Oblast.

The governor of Astrakhan Oblast claimed that an oil refinery was set on fire by drones.

Germany announced an aid package to Ukraine consisting of 10,000 rounds for Gepard air defence, 5,000 155 mm rounds, 2,000 122 mm rounds and ammunition for various fighting vehicles supplied by Germany, and 24 MRAPs.

Zelenskyy signed a law allowing the Ukrainian military to operate overseas in times of martial law.

=== 18 March ===
Ukrainian Lieutenant General Serhii Naiev said that Ukrainian forces withdrew from an unknown frontline sector in Donetsk Oblast to preserve its forces and obtain better positions.

The Ukrainian military claimed to have destroyed a command post of the Russian 20th Army's 3rd Motor Rifle Division near Demidovka, Belgorod Oblast.

Putin ordered Russian forces to halt attacks targeting Ukrainian energy infrastructure for 30 days after his phone call with Trump.

Russian forces shot down seven Russian drones headed for Ukrainian energy facilities connected to "Ukraine's military-industrial complex" over Mykolaiv Oblast. Six were shot down by a Russian Pantsir missile system and the last by a Russian fighter jet.

Russian sources claimed that Ukrainian forces attacked from Sumy Oblast into the villages of Demidovka, Grafovka, and Prilesye in Belgorod Oblast. Russian forces later claimed to have repelled the attack.

=== 19 March ===
Russian authorities reported that Ukrainian drones struck and damaged an oil pumping station in Krasnodar Krai, while Russia launched 145 drones and six missiles into Ukraine. A number of hospitals in Sumy Oblast were attacked by Russian drones, while one person was killed in a separate attack on a residential building.

Russia and Ukraine conducted a prisoner exchange that saw the release of 175 POWs from their respective sides.

Zelenskyy announced that additional F-16s had arrived in Ukraine from an undisclosed country.

=== 20 March ===
Russia claimed that it downed 132 drones launched by Ukraine. Explosions were reported near the Engels-2 air base. Ukrainian intelligence stated that a warehouse with guided bombs and missiles was destroyed. The governor of Saratov Oblast, Roman Busargin, confirmed that the attack "left an airfield on fire" and nearby residents had to be evacuated. Fifty drones were reportedly used, targeting ammunition storage at the air base. Satellite images showed several large craters. Reports stated that three service personnel were wounded, while two were killed. Some 120 civilians were evacuated and some 180 private homes were damaged due to the shockwave from the explosion. Clinical Hospital No. 1 in Engels was damaged by falling debris. Five civilians were reported injured. Ukrainian intelligence claimed that the attack on Engels-2 destroyed some 96 cruise missiles.

Russian forces launched over 20 drones overnight and attacked Kropyvnytskyi, injuring 10 people including four children.

The HUR claimed that two Russian officers were killed in a car bombing in Skadovsk, Kherson Oblast.

Two people were injured in a car bombing in Rivne.

=== 21 March ===
Three people were killed in a Russian drone strike on Zaporizhzhia.

The Sudzha gas pumping and metering station in Kursk Oblast was shelled, with Russia and Ukraine trading responsibility over the attack. DTEK reported that Russian drone strikes caused power outages in at least three districts in Odesa.

The governor of Belgorod Oblast claimed that one person was killed in a Ukrainian drone strike in Dobrino.

The UK government and the Irish subsidiary of the French company Thales signed a contract to manufacture 5,000 NLAWs for the Ukrainian army.

=== 22 March ===
Ukrainian drones struck the Russian Promsintez explosives factory in Chapayevsk, Samara Oblast. The local governor, Vyacheslav Fedorishev, said that the attack resulted in "no damage or casualties", while one drone was shot down. However, footage on Telegram showed explosions in the area of the factory.

=== 23 March ===
Three people were killed in a Russian drone strike on Kyiv, while three others were killed in a separate attack in Dobropillia.

Ukrainian drones attacked an oil refinery in Volgograd. According to Russian sources the drones were shot down as they approached the facility. The governor of Rostov Oblast claimed that one person was killed in a drone attack on a car.

Ukraine said it had retaken the settlement of Nadiia in Luhansk Oblast following a 30-hour operation.

Atesh claimed to have destroyed a transformer cabinet on a railway line in Smolensk Oblast to disrupt the transport of military cargo toward Bryansk and Kursk Oblasts.

The website of Ukrainian Railways was hit by a massive cyberattack.

=== 24 March ===
The Ukrainian military claimed to have launched missile strikes that destroyed two Russian Ka-52 and two Mi-8 helicopters at a landing site in Belgorod Oblast. The landing site was struck by "missile strikes", including rockets fired from HIMARS.

Three Russian journalists working for Izvestia and Zvezda were killed in a strike on their car in the Kupiansk sector, according to Izvestia. The head of the Luhansk People's Republic, Leonid Pasechnik, and the Investigative Committee of Russia said that they were killed along with three civilians in Kreminna.

=== 25 March ===
The Ukrainian Air Force claimed to have killed 30 Russian soldiers during a "precise strike" in Kondratovka in Kursk Oblast.

The United States said it had brokered an agreement for Russia and Ukraine to stop military action in the Black Sea and ensure safe navigation of shipping following negotiations in Saudi Arabia.

Russian millbloggers claimed that Russian forces cleared the villages of Demidovka and Popovka in Belgorod Oblast. The Russian defense ministry claimed that Russian forces took the rural settlement of Myrne, northeast of Lyman in Donetsk Oblast.

The SBU arrested a Ukrainian soldier on suspicion of providing coordinates of Ukrainian positions in Kursk Oblast for Russian intelligence.

=== 26 March ===
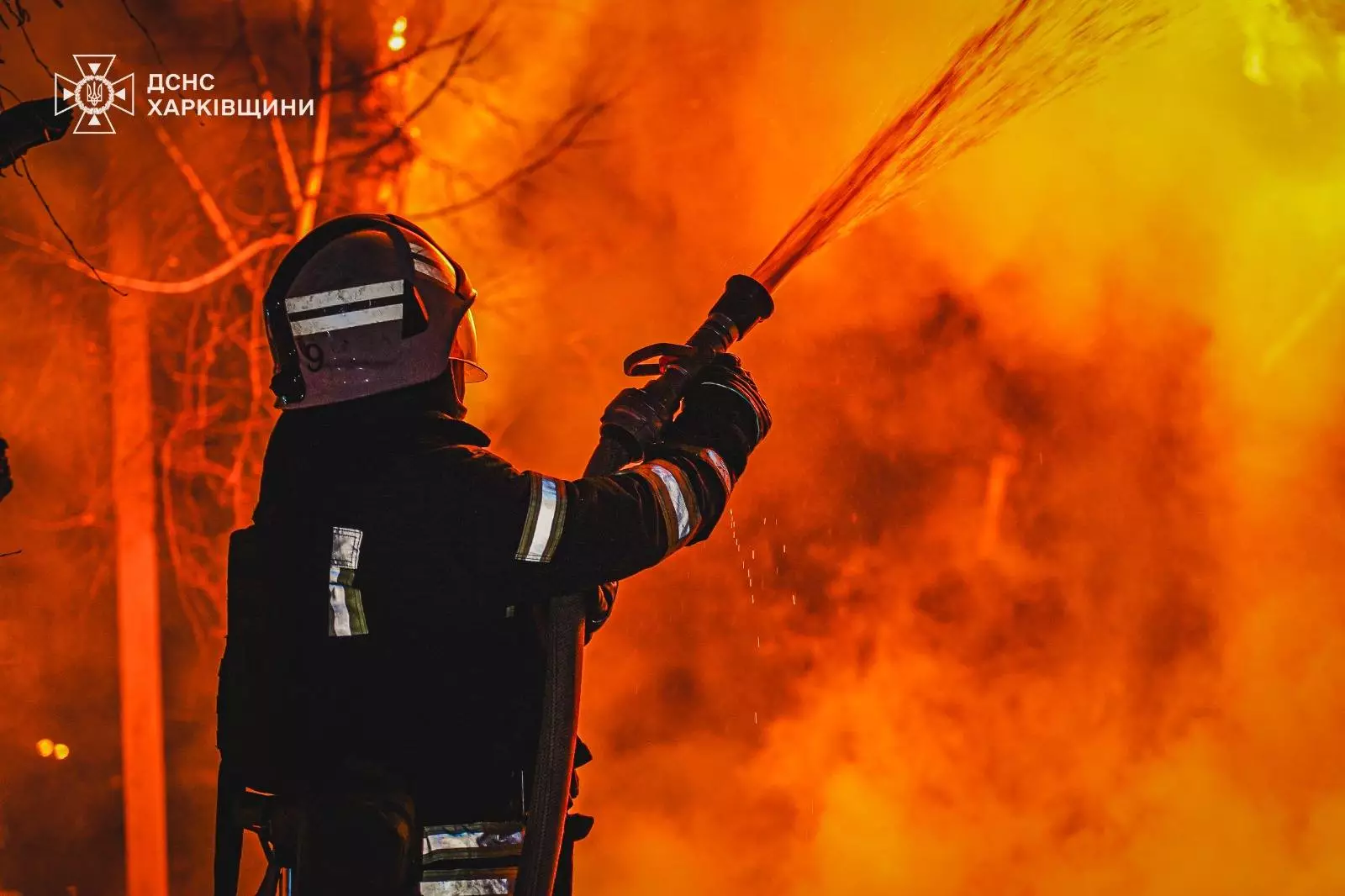
Extinguishing a fire in Kharkiv after drone attack on 26 March

Russia's Channel One said that one of its film crew hit a landmine in Belgorod Oblast near the Ukrainian border, killing journalist Anna Prokofieva and injuring a cameraman.

A court in Rostov-on-Don convicted 23 members of the Azov Brigade, including 11 in absentia, of terrorism charges related to the war in Ukraine, and sentenced them to up to 23 years' imprisonment.

The French government announced a 2 billion euros ($2.1 billion) military aid package for Ukraine. Including missiles for Mirage-2000 fighters, MILAN anti-tank missiles, AMX-10 RC light tanks, VAB troop carriers and Mistral missiles.

=== 27 March ===
The Ukrainian Air Force said that Russia fired 86 drones and an Iskander-M ballistic missile in overnight attacks.

Ukrainian commander Oleksandr Syrskyi said that Russia had lost more than 55,000 soldiers during the fighting in Kursk, with 970 soldiers surrendering to Ukrainian forces, 22,200 killed and 31,800 as "sanitary casualties".

The Ukrainian military claimed to have killed the commander of the 1st Battalion of the Russian 9th Motor Rifle Regiment in an attack on a command and observation post somewhere between Viktorovka and Uspenovka in Kursk Oblast. It also claimed to have killed between 15 to 40 Russian soldiers in an airstrike on the Pogar border checkpoint in Bryansk Oblast.

=== 28 March ===
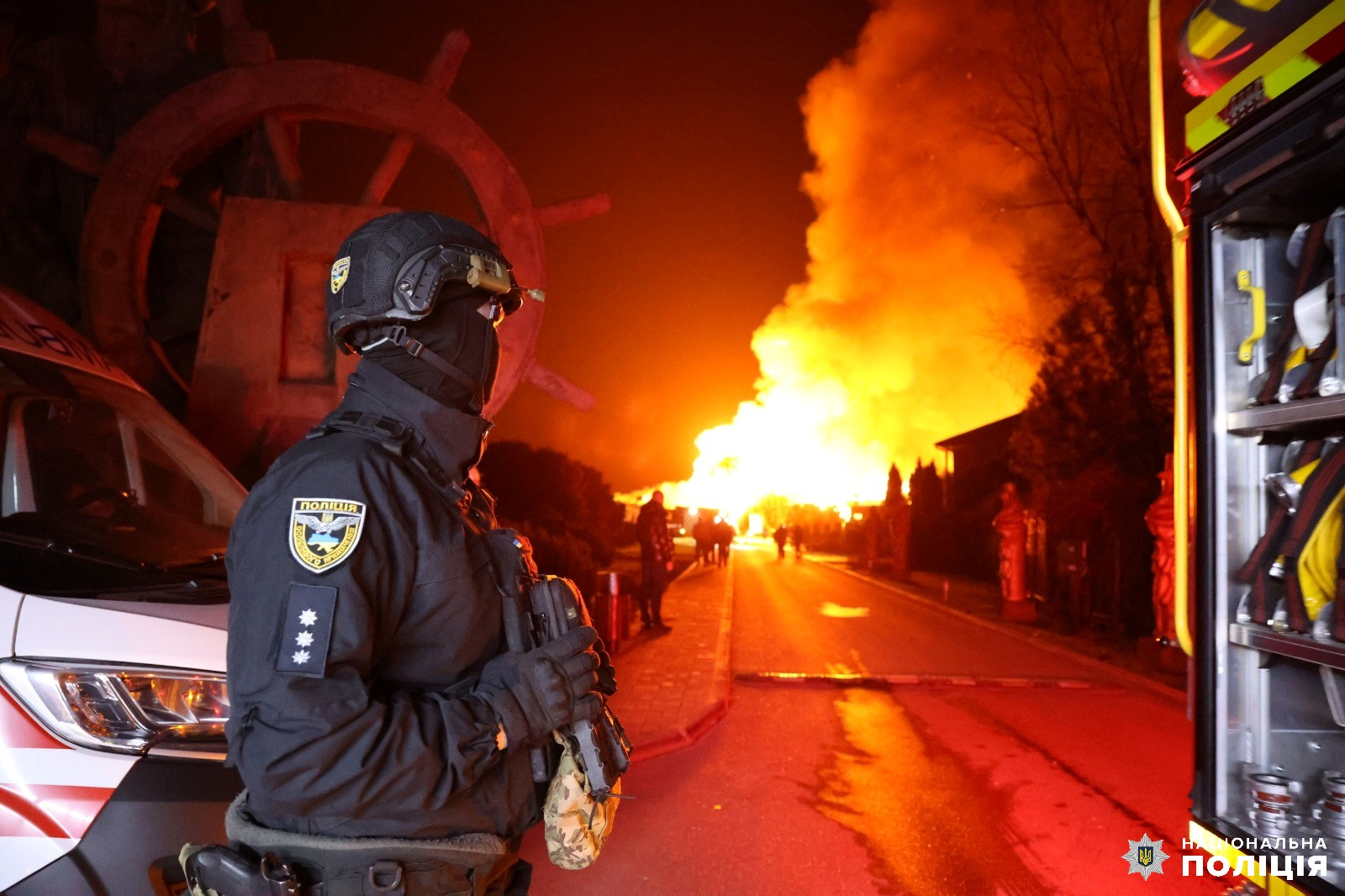
Burning hotel-restaurant complex in Dnipro after the attack

Four people were killed in a Russian drone attack on Dnipro.

Soldiers from the Ukrainian 101st Territorial Defense Brigade planted and detonated anti-tank mines beneath a high rise building in Toretsk containing Russian soldiers from an "assault group".

Russia and Ukraine traded blame for another attack on the Sudzha gas metering station in Kursk Oblast.

The remains of 909 Ukrainian soldiers killed in action were repatriated from Russia in exchange for those of 43 Russian personnel.

Russian forces claimed to have taken the village of Krasne Pershe, northeast of Kupiansk.

=== 29 March ===
Two people were killed in a Russian drone strike on Kharkiv. Ukraine also accused Russia of inflicting casualties on patients being treated at a military hospital during the attack.

Russia claimed to have taken the villages of Shchebraky in Zaporizhzhia Oblast, Panteleimonivka in Donetsk Oblast, and Veselivka in Sumy Oblast. Geo-located footage showed that Russian forces took the village of Preobrazhenka in Donetsk Oblast.

=== 30 March ===
Geo-located footage confirmed Russian control of Veselivka in Sumy Oblast.

=== 31 March ===
The SBU arrested three people, including a Russian national, on suspicion of facilitating Russian attacks on Kyiv.

The Moscow Metro was targeted by a suspected cyberattack involving its website displaying messages shown during the 23 March cyberattack on Ukrainian Railways.

Geolocated footage provided by the Russian defense ministry showed that Russian forces took the town of Gogolevka in Kursk Oblast. Geo-located footage showed that Russian forces took the rural settlement of Rozlyv in the Kurakhove sector of Donetsk Oblast.

Sweden announced a military aid package to Ukraine worth $1.6 billion, its largest aid package since the full scale invasion occurred.

Ukrainian drones destroyed Kh-22 missiles at Shaykovka air base in Kaluga Oblast according to satellite imagery. Ukrainian military commander Oleksandr Syrskyi said that a drone destroyed a Tu-22M3 after it landed.

== April 2025 ==
=== 1 April ===
Russian-installed officials in Donetsk Oblast claimed that 15 people were injured in a Ukrainian drone strike in Horlivka.

The SBU announced the arrest in Poland and extradition of a person accused of being a pro-Russian propagandist linked to a disinformation network operated by oligarch Viktor Medvedchuk.

=== 2 April ===
Four people were killed in a Russian missile attack on Kryvyi Rih. One person was killed in a drone strike in Zaporizhzhia city.

Geo-located footage showed that Russian forces took the village of Oleksandropil in Donetsk Oblast and Lobkove in Zaporizhzhia Oblast.

=== 3 April ===
Four people were killed in a Russian drone strike on Kharkiv.

The Russian defense ministry claimed that Russian forces took the village of Vesele, northwest of Velyka Novosilka.

Major General Apti Alaudinov confirmed that a commander of a Kadyrovite UAV unit (callsign "Amur") was killed. The HUR claimed responsibility for the explosion, which occurred in Melitopol and destroyed a Tigr armoured car, killing five "Kadyrovites" in total.

=== 4 April ===
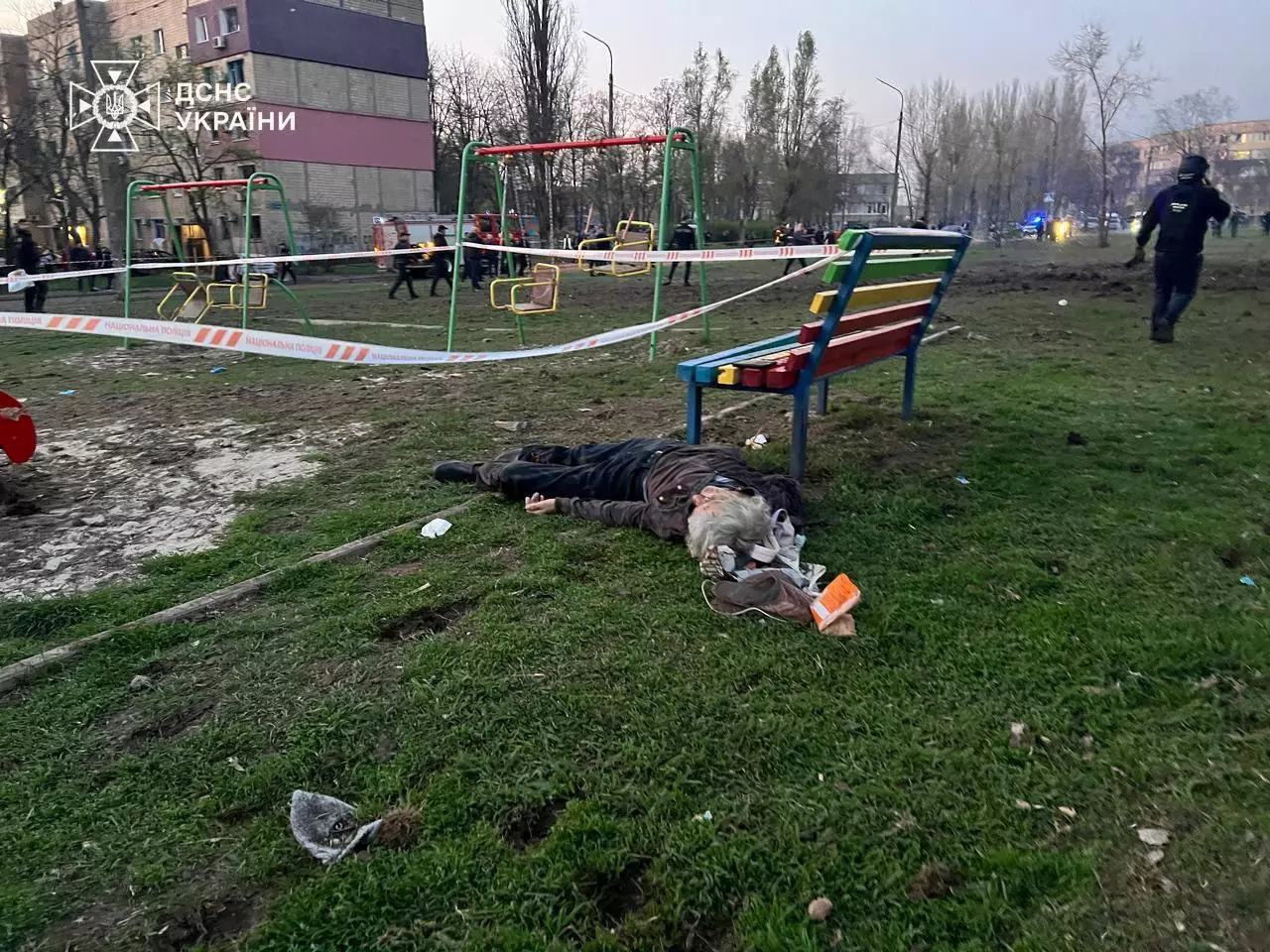
Yard in Kryvyi Rih after the attack

19 people were killed in a Russian missile attack on Kryvyi Rih. A drone attack on the city later that day killed one person.

The Russian defense ministry claimed that Russian forces took the village of Uspenivka in the Pokrovsk sector of Donetsk Oblast.

Oleksandr Syrskyi, Commander-in-Chief of the Ukrainian Armed Forces, claimed that Ukraine is deploying drones that use exceptionally long fibre-optic cables "with a combat range of 20 km".

Germany announced it would send 500,000 155 mm artillery shells to Ukraine in 2025. At the same time the Czech initiative has enough funding to supply Ukraine with artillery until September 2025.

=== 5 April ===
Ukrainian drones attacked two factories in Russia, including the only fibre-optic manufacturing plant in the country, located in Mordovia and an explosives manufacturer in Samara Oblast.

The Netherlands announced it would invest €1.1 billion in the Ukrainian domestic defence industry.

Geo-located footage showed that Russian forces retook the village of Solone in the Pokrovsk sector of Donetsk Oblast.

=== 6 April ===
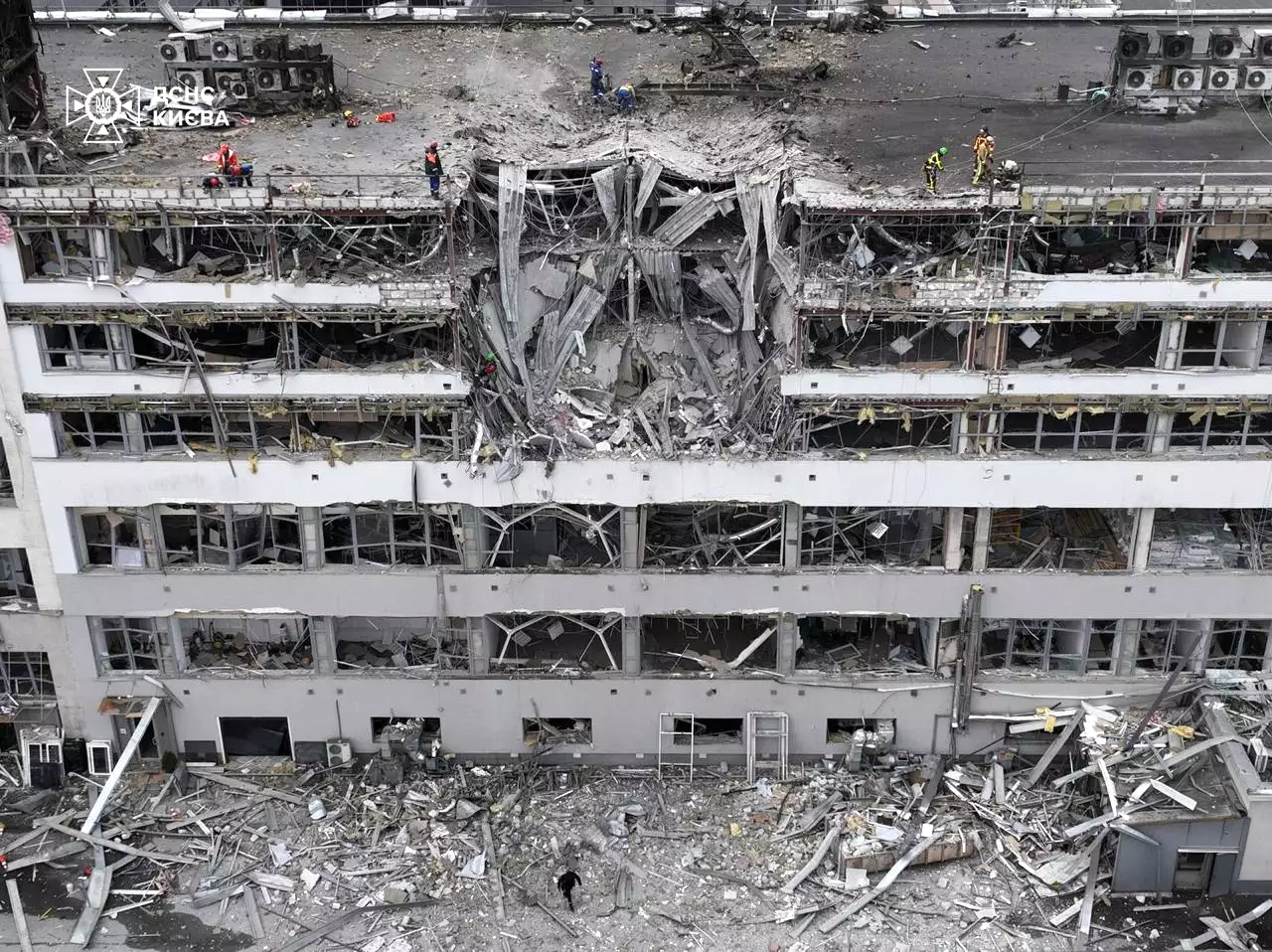
Destroyed building in Kyiv, which housed editorial offices of Ukrainian broadcasting channels for foreign audiences

One person was killed in a Russian missile attack on Kyiv. Another person was killed in a drone strike in Kherson.

The Russian defense ministry claimed that Russian forces captured the village of Basivka in Sumy Oblast, which was confirmed by the regional governor on 26 May.

=== 7 April ===
An Indian-made electronic component was found inside a Geran-2 drone for the first time following the discovery of an Aura semiconductor inside its CRP antenna.

Ukrainian drones destroyed three Buk missile launchers in Kursk Oblast over 12 hours.

The Russian defense ministry claimed that Russian forces took the village of Katerynivka, northeast of Lyman.

=== 8 April ===
President Zelenskyy officially confirmed that the 225th Assault Regiment was conducting "active operations" in Belgorod Oblast. He also announced the capture of two Chinese nationals fighting for Russia in Donetsk Oblast.

The Russian ministry of defense announced the recapture of Guyevo in Kursk Oblast.

The Prosecutor General of Ukraine announced the arrest of a man from Crimea on suspicion of carrying out assassinations of soldiers and government officials as well as bomb attacks for Russian intelligence.

The Russian military acknowledged that due to a shortage of explosives Russian tanks are now having to use non-explosive reactive armour.

Belgium announced it would hand over two F-16s to Ukraine this year and another two in 2026.

=== 9 April ===
Ukrainian drones struck the Orenburg Air Base for the first time since the full scale invasion. Attacks were reported on an air base in Mozdok, North Ossetia and at Engels-2 air base. The Russian MoD said that the attack involved 158 drones across multiple regions.

Russian air defences shot down a Russian helicopter during a Ukrainian drone attack on Moscow. It was believed to have been mistaken for a drone by air defences.

=== 10 April ===
One person was killed in a Russian drone strike in Zhytomyr Oblast, while another was killed in a missile attack in Dnipro.

The commander of the Ukrainian Unmanned Systems Forces, Colonel Vadym Sukharevsky, was dismissed.

A Russian court sentenced Ukrainian citizen Vadim Chaly to 16 years in prison and fined 500,000 rubles ($5,900) for plotting to send packages rigged with explosives targeting Russian military officials. Chaly pleaded guilty to the charges.

=== 11 April ===
A Ukrainian MiG-29, using two French AASM HAMMER bombs, destroyed a company command post and a building occupied by a "security unit" in Kherson Oblast.

German Defence Minister Boris Pistorius announced aid that had been delivered or had been promised by the German government, including 30 Patriot missiles, four more IRIS-T systems, 15 Leopard 1 tanks, 100,000 rounds of artillery ammunition and 1,100 ground radars.

Russian forces broke through the lines in Toretsk and advanced to the village of Nelipivka.

The British government announced they had sent 350 million pounds worth of military aid to Ukraine, including funding for FPV drones and radar systems. This package comes as part of the 4.5 billion pounds the UK promised to Ukraine in January.

=== 12 April ===
One person was killed in a Russian drone strike in Kherson.

A 26-year old Ukrainian F-16 pilot, Pavlo Ivanov, was killed in combat. BBC News Ukrainian reported that Russia had fired three missiles at the F-16, which was probably flying over Sumy Oblast, including S-400 ground-to-air and R-37 air-to-air missiles.

Geo-located footage showed that Russian forces took the village of Kalynove, west of New York, Donetsk Oblast.

=== 13 April ===
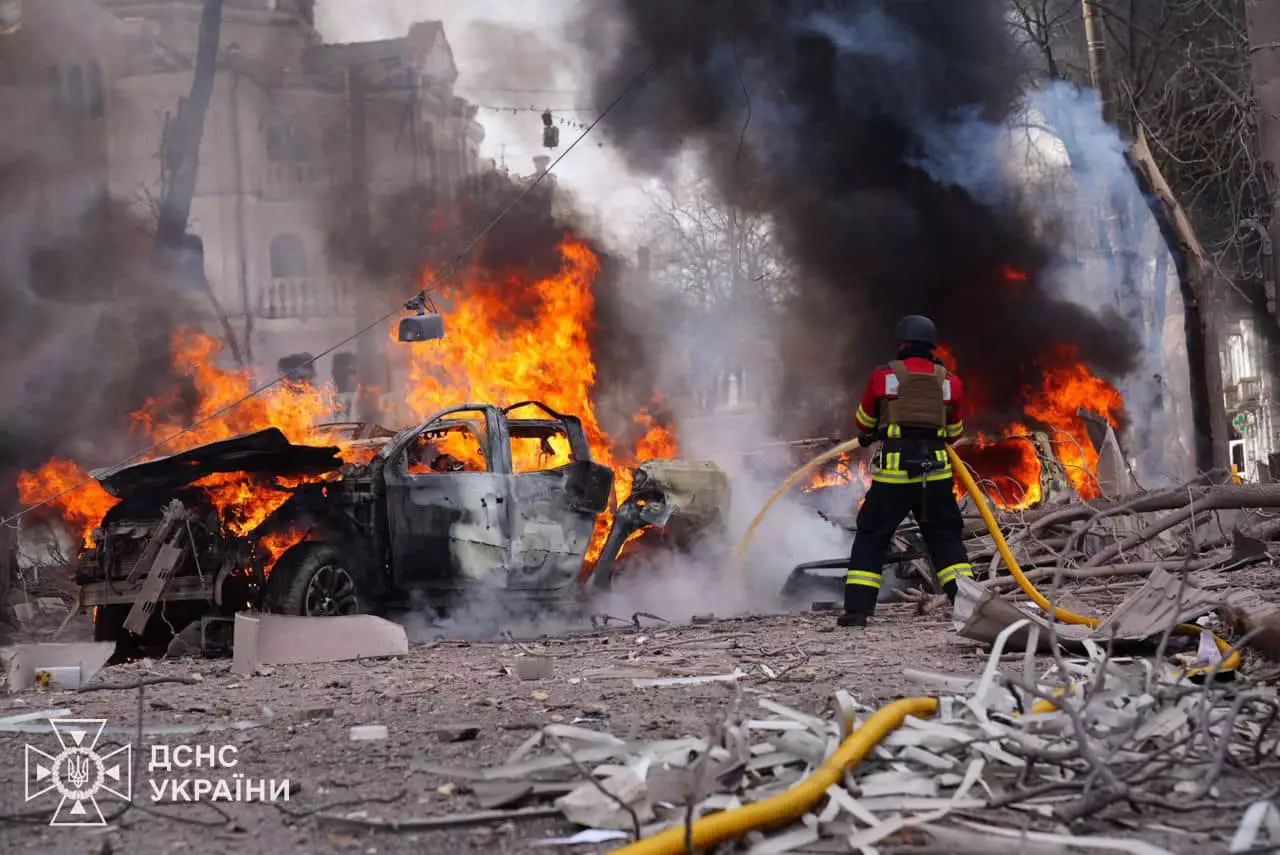
Street of Sumy after the attack

Thirty-five people were killed in a Russian missile attack on Sumy. Three people were killed in separate attacks in Kherson.

The Ukrainian Unmanned Systems Forces released the first footage of a laser weapon system, called "Tryzub", in use destroying a fibre-optic FPV drone.

=== 14 April ===
The SBU arrested an instructor at the Yavoriv military base in Lviv Oblast on suspicion of plotting to assassinate base commanders on behalf of Russia.

The Ukrainian Air Force bombed a Russian drone unit, hidden in a sugar factory, in the village of Tyotkino, Kursk Oblast.

EU foreign policy chief Kaja Kallas told reporters that the EU "managed to secure two-thirds" of two millions artillery shells pledged for Ukraine by the end of 2025.

A Ukrainian source claimed that Russian forces took the rural settlement of Valentynivka, southwest of Toretsk.

=== 15 April ===
The Ukrainian military claimed to have retaken the village of Dniproenerhiia in Volnovakha Raion, Donetsk Oblast.

Ukrainian drones struck a multi-story apartment block in Kursk city, killing one person and injuring nine others. The Russian MoD claimed to have intercepted 109 drones over Kursk Oblast.

The Ukrainian military claimed to have carried out a strike at the base in Kursk Oblast of the Russian 448th Missile Brigade accused of carrying out the 2025 Sumy airstrike, resulting in an explosion at an ammunition depot.

A mobilised Russian soldier, Roman Ivanishin, was convicted and sentenced to 15 years' imprisonment by a court-martial in Sakhalin Oblast for "desertion and attempted voluntary surrender" after being captured by Ukrainian forces in 2023 in Donetsk Oblast and released in a prisoner exchange in 2024, in what is the first known conviction in Russia for voluntarily surrender in the full-scale invasion.

=== 16 April ===
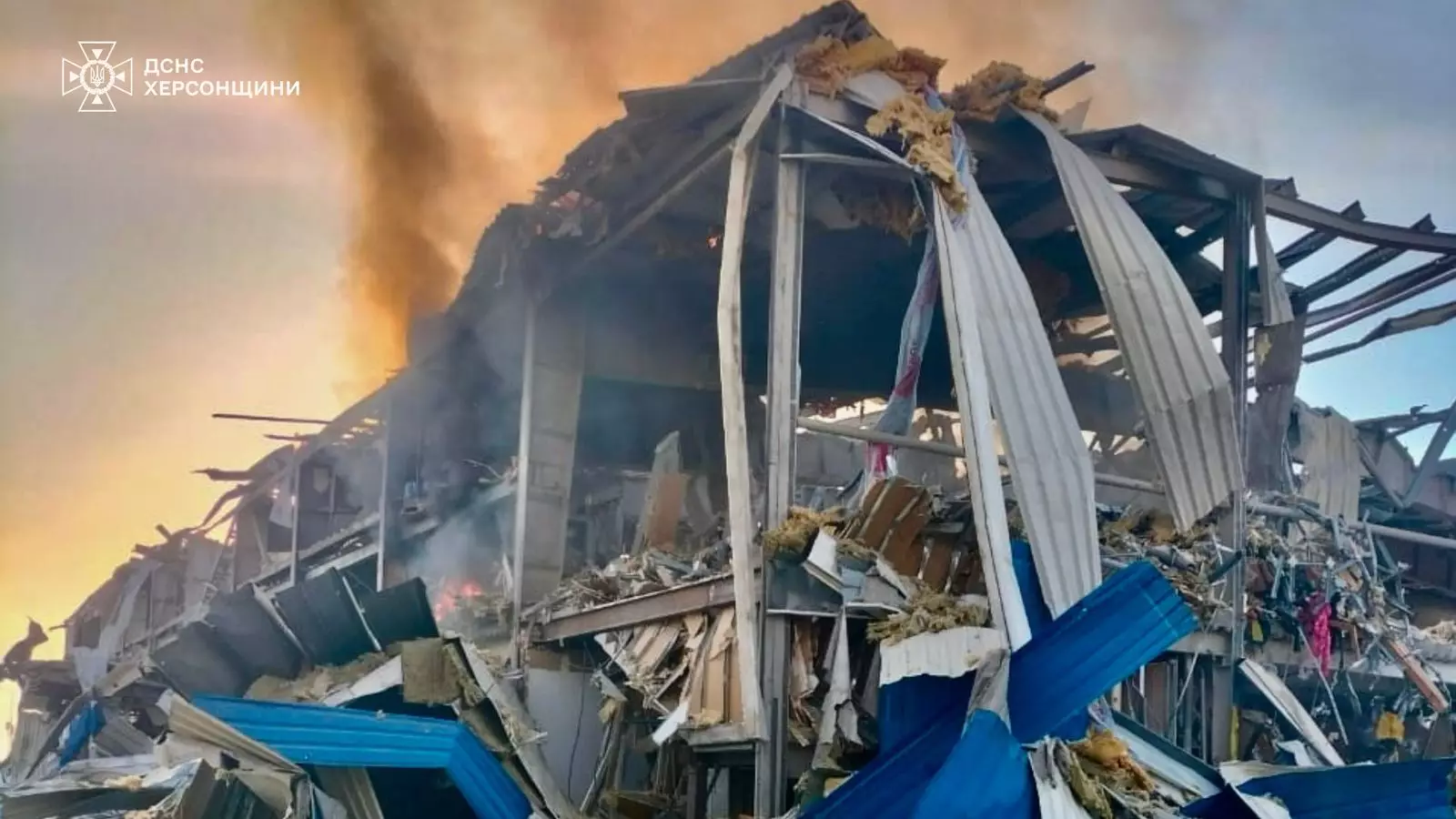
Ice arena in Kherson after the bombing on 16 April

Three people were killed in a Russian drone strike on Dnipro. One person was killed in a Russian attack on Kherson.

A drone strike was carried out on military infrastructure in Shuya, Ivanovo Oblast, linked to the Russian 112th Missile Brigade, which was accused of carrying out the 2025 Sumy airstrike. Russia claimed that its air defenses shot down seven Ukrainian drones over Ivanovo Oblast that morning.

The SBU said it arrested nine members of a Russian intelligence network, including five minors, who were plotting bomb attacks in central and eastern Ukraine.

The FSB said it arrested a resident of Luhansk Oblast on suspicion of plotting to assassinate a member of the People's Council of the Luhansk People's Republic on behalf of Ukraine.

A Russian-installed court in Donetsk sentenced three members of the Azov Battalion to 24 years' imprisonment for war crimes during the siege of Mariupol.

The Russian defense ministry claimed that its forces took control of the village of Kalynove, located west of New York, Donetsk Oblast.

Russian forces recaptured the St. Nicholas Monastery west of Guyevo in Kursk Oblast.

=== 17 April ===
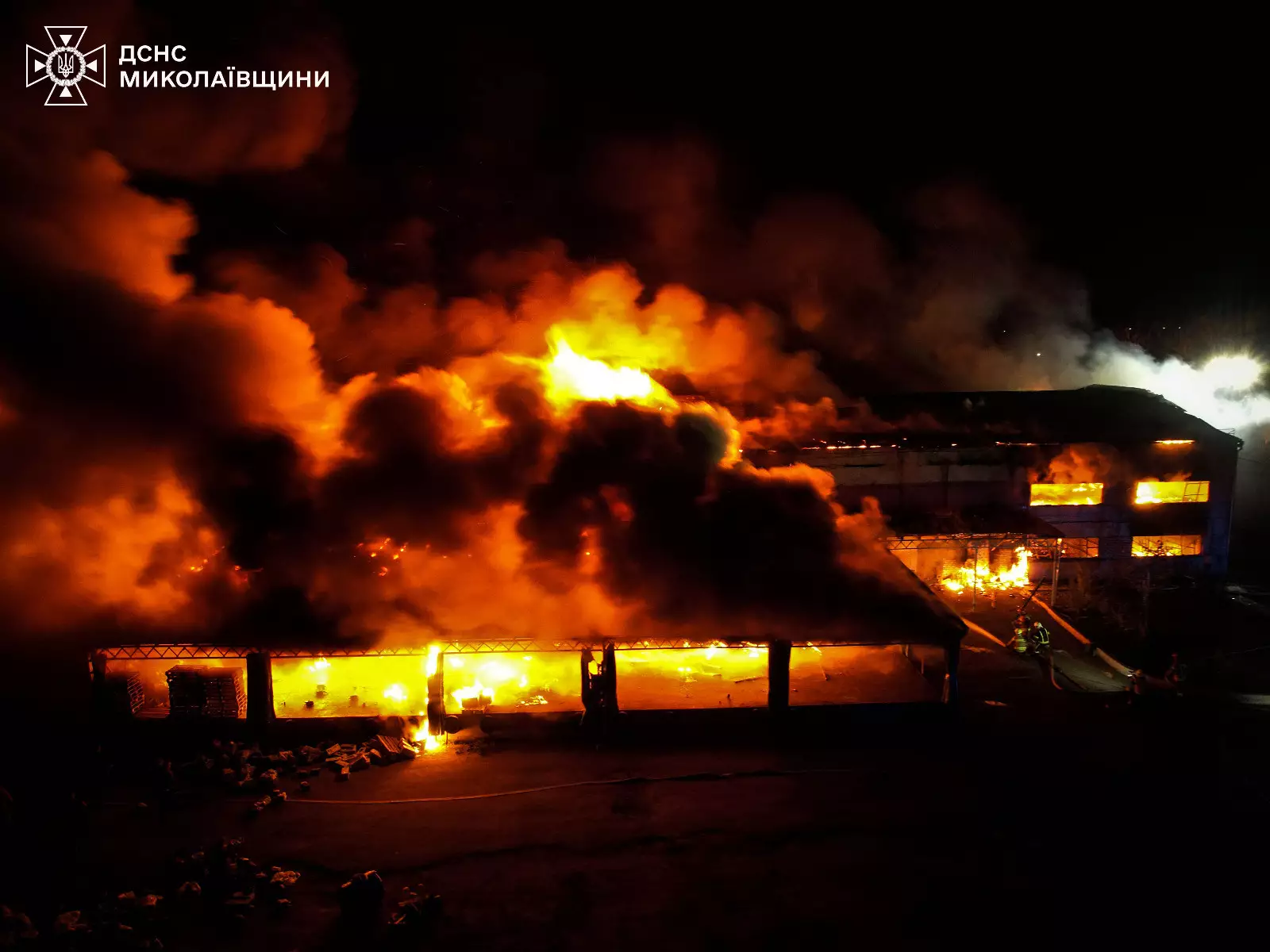
Storage building in Mykolaiv after drone attack on 17 April

Two people were killed by Russian shelling in Nikopol.

Ukrainian drones struck Shuya, Ivanovo Oblast for a second consecutive time, causing a fire.

Ukrainian forces claimed to have recaptured 16 square kilometers of Donetsk Oblast and repelled a major assault on five villages in Zaporizhzhia Oblast.

The German government announced a new aid package that included three 155 mm SpGH Zuzana howitzers, 27,000 155 mm shells, 1,000 122 mm shells, 1,000 IRIS-T missiles, 917 MATADOR rockets and other weapons.

The US and Ukraine signed a "memorandum of intent" to move forward with a deal allowing US access to Ukraine's "natural resources and critical minerals".

=== 18 April ===
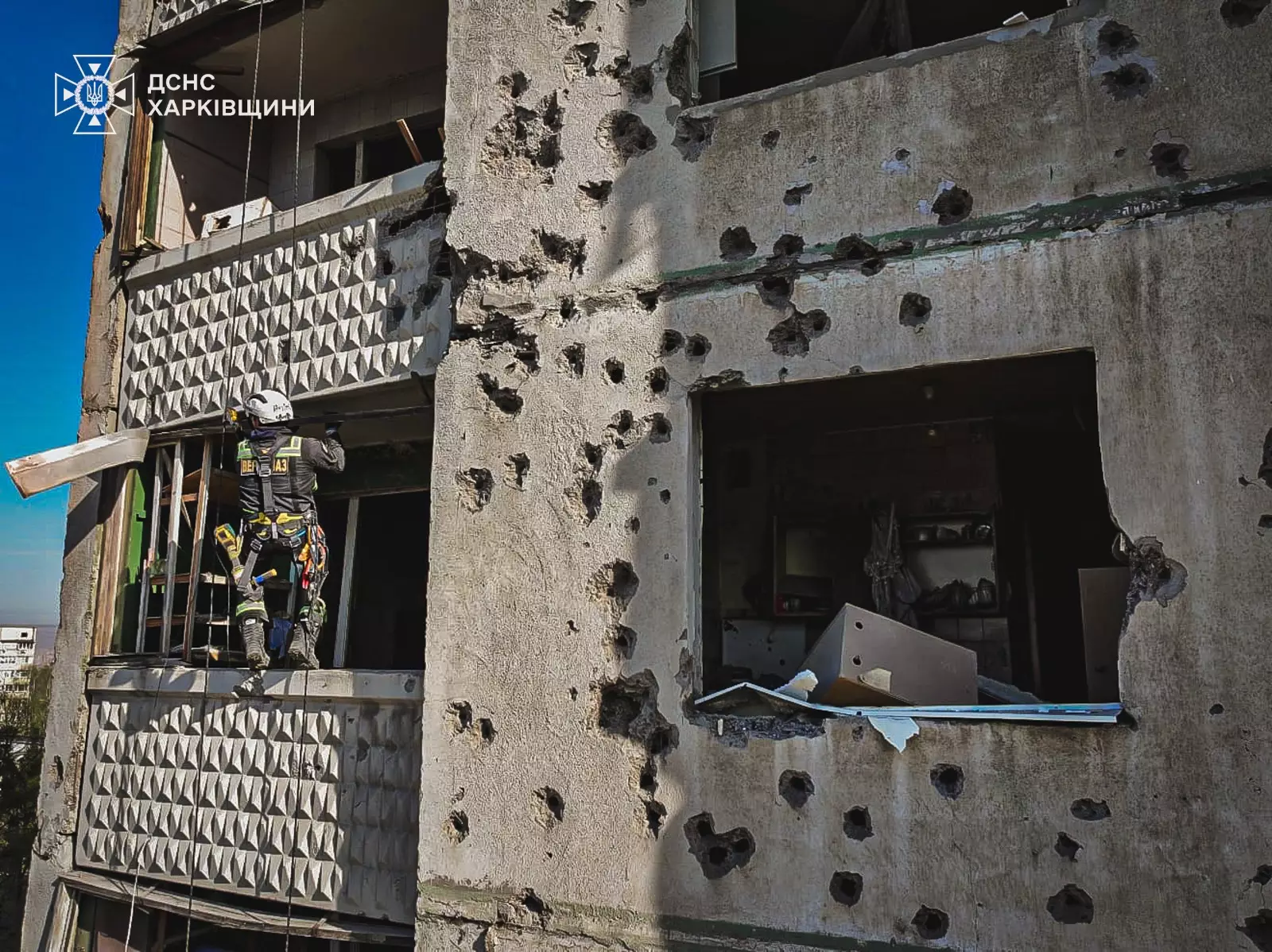
Apartment building in Kharkiv after the attack

One person was killed in a Russian missile attack on Kharkiv. Another was killed in a drone strike in Sumy.

The bodies of 909 Ukrainian soldiers killed in action were repatriated from Russia in exchange for those of 41 Russian soldiers killed in action.

President Zelenskyy, citing the SBU and the HUR, claimed that China is supplying Russia with weapons, "including gunpowder and artillery ammunition".

Yevgeny Rytikov, the head of the Bryansk Electromechanical Plant and a leading designer of Russian Electronic Warfare systems, was killed in a car bombing in Bryansk.

=== 19 April ===
Russia and Ukraine conducted a prisoner exchange that saw both sides releasing 246 POWs each.

Some 100 Russian soldiers broke down a fence and escaped a military camp in Krasnodar after being detained for attempted desertion.

Russian forces claimed to have pushed Ukrainian forces out of Oleshnya in Kursk Oblast up to the international border. The Russian defense ministry claimed that Russian forces took the village of Novomykolaivka in the Lyman sector of Donetsk Oblast before the start of the easter ceasefire.

Ukraine launched a missile attack on a Russian drone launch site in Kursk Oblast near Tyotkino, killing up to 20 drone operators.

Putin declared a unilateral ceasefire that would last until 00:00 Moscow time on 21 April. Despite this, Ukraine said attacks by Russia continued. The BBC reported that Kherson was quiet without the usual daytime shelling.

=== 20 April ===
A court in Russia's Sverdlovsk Oblast sentenced a resident of Lesnoy for treason over his donating the equivalent of $25 to the Ukrainian military in 2022.

=== 21 April ===
The SBU arrested two people in Chernihiv and Khmelnytskyi oblasts on suspicion of spying for Russia, as well as five others for disseminating Russian propaganda and justifying war crimes.

Ukrainian drones destroyed a Russian Buk-M2.

=== 22 April ===
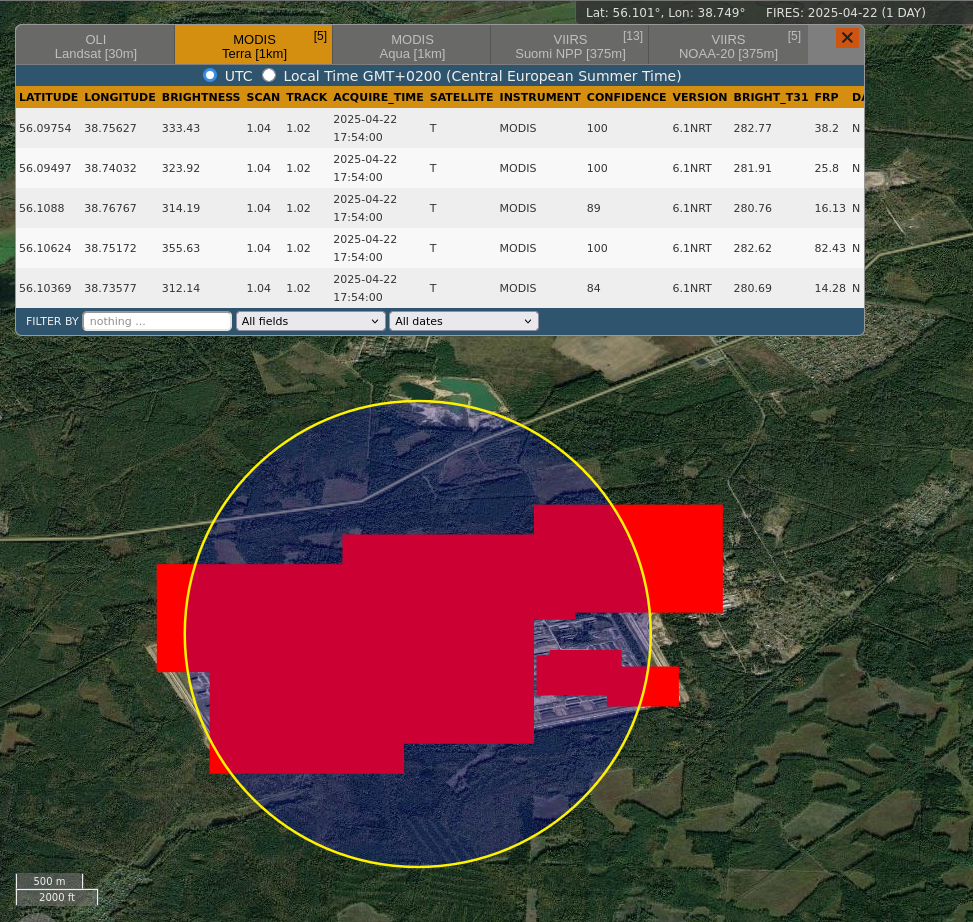
NASA's FIRMS detected extensive fire at the 51st GRAU depot on 22 April 2025 17:54:00 (UTC)

One person was killed in a Russian airstrike on Zaporizhzhia.

Ukrainian drones struck the depot of the 51st Main Missile and Artillery Directorate in the village of Barsovo, Vladimir Oblast. Neighbouring villages were evacuated. The Russian Ministry of Defense acknowledged the explosion, which was caused by a "safety protocol violation" that resulted in a fire. Authorities said that four people, including three soldiers, were injured.

A BMP-55 prototype, a T-55 tank converted to a troop carrier, was found abandoned and photographed somewhere in Ukraine. It is the first one known to be deployed in the field.

Ukraine received the first Swedish Saab 340 AEW&C. It conducted two days of test flights over Lviv.

The SBU charged 14 high-ranking metropolitans and archbishops of the Russian Orthodox Church for their involvement in the seizure of churches in Russian-occupied territories.

=== 23 April ===
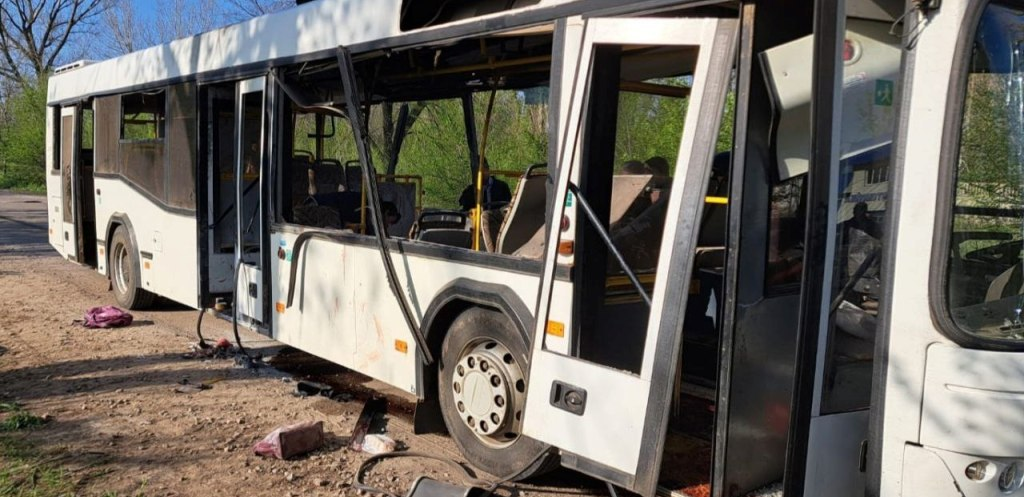
Bus in Marhanets after the attack

Nine people were killed in a Russian drone strike on a bus in Marhanets, Dnipropetrovsk Oblast.

Ukrainian drones targeted the Alabuga Special Economic Zone in Tatarstan, which is believed to host a Shahed factory. Airports in Nizhnekamsk and Kazan were closed. The Russian MoD claimed to have intercepted all drones.

Russian forces captured the rural settlement of Sukha Balka, southwest of Toretsk.

=== 24 April ===
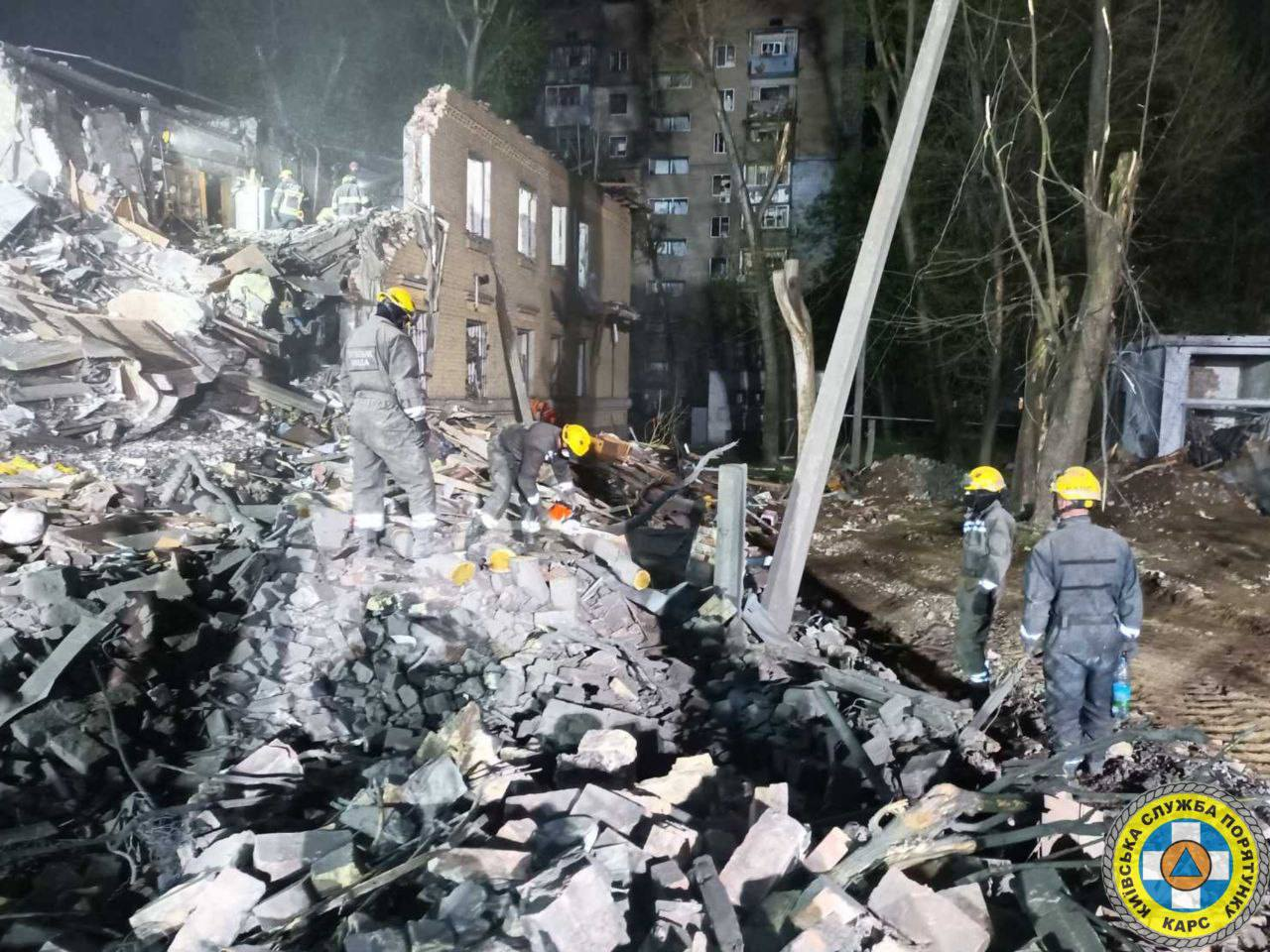
Apartment building in Kyiv after the attack

Thirteen people were killed in a Russian missile and drone attack on Kyiv.

The governor of Belgorod Oblast claimed that one person was killed in a Ukrainian drone strike in Mokraya Orlovka.

Former Russian Major General Ivan Popov, who had been arrested for criticism of the Russian war effort in Ukraine, was sentenced to five years for corruption by a Russian court for stealing "130 million roubles ($1.56 million)" worth of steel intended for fortifications in Ukraine.

=== 25 April ===
Three people were killed in a Russian air attack on Pavlohrad.

Major General Yaroslav Moskalik, deputy head of the Main Operational Directorate of the General Staff of the Russian Armed Forces, was killed when a car bomb exploded as he walked by in Balashikha, Moscow Oblast.

The governor of Dnipropetrovsk Oblast issued evacuation orders for residents of four villages in Mezhova, located on the border with Donetsk Oblast, due to the approach of Russian forces.

Michael Gloss, the 21-year-old son of CIA deputy director Julianne Gloss, was confirmed killed while fighting for Russia, in Ukraine, sometime in spring 2024.

The SBU announced the seizure of a cargo vessel in Ukrainian territorial waters on suspicion of leaving the port of Sevastopol with wheat grown in Russian-occupied territories.

A Russian S-400's 91N6 radar was struck by Ukrainian drones in Crimea, with photos showing partial damage to its radar's tracking antenna.

=== 26 April ===
Russian forces claimed to have fully recaptured Kursk Oblast from Ukrainian forces. Ukrainian forces said that they are still fighting in Kursk.

Geo-located footage showed that Russian forces retook the village of Popovka in Belgorod Oblast.

The Ukrainian 73rd Naval Special Operations Center raided positions held by the 810th Guards Naval Infantry Brigade in Kursk Oblast and claimed to have destroyed "a unit of servicemen" and took two prisoners.

=== 27 April ===
Three people were killed in Russian airstrikes on Kostiantynivka.

The partisan group "Atesh" said it had destroyed a transformer cabinet on a railway near Stanytsia Luhanska in occupied Luhansk Oblast.

Ukrainian forces killed Buvaysar Khasanovich Umkhanov, a Chechen commander of Akhmat Brigade Battalion in Kursk Oblast during a strike on his command post.

Czech Defense Minister Jana Černochová said that "400,000 large-caliber ammunition rounds" had been supplied to Ukraine by the Czech ammunition initiative, reducing Russian artillery advantage from "1-to-10 in Russia's favor to 1-to-2."

=== 28 April ===
The governor of Bryansk Oblast claimed that one person was killed in a Ukrainian drone strike in Bryansk city. The Russian MoD claimed to have destroyed a total of 102 drones, while Pulkovo Airport in St. Petersburg temporarily suspended operations. A Ukrainian official later said that the Kremniy EL electronics plant, responsible for making microchips for various Russian missiles, was damaged.

North Korea admitted to sending its military to fight alongside Russian forces in Kursk Oblast against Ukraine.

A Ukrainian Su-27 was lost "while repelling a drone attack". The pilot ejected safely.

Putin announced a 72-hour ceasefire from 8–10 May to mark the 80th anniversary of the defeat of Nazi Germany in World War II. President Zelenskyy rejected the proposal as "manipulation", saying that it was to "ensure silence for Putin during the parade (Victory Day)".

The Russian defense ministry reported that Russian forces captured the village of Kamianka, northeast of Kupiansk.

=== 29 April ===
The governor of Belgorod Oblast claimed that two people were killed in a Ukrainian drone strike on a car travelling along the Ukrainian border.

The Romanian and Italian Air Forces deployed fighters during a Russian drone attack on Ukraine in which a drone crossed 500 meters into Romanian airspace before reentering Ukraine.

The Russian defense ministry claimed that Russian forces took the village of Doroshivka, northwest of Kupiansk.

=== 30 April ===
One person was killed in a Russian drone strike on Dnipro.

SBU drones struck the Murom Instrument-Making Plant in Russia's Vladimir Oblast. The SBU claimed that the plant made "ammunition ignition devices and components" for the Russian military.

South Korean MPs Lee Seong-kweun and Kim Byung-kee, after a briefing from the National Intelligence Service, said that 600 North Koreans had been killed fighting for Russia, bringing total North Korean casualty figures in the war to 4,700 injured and killed.

The SBU named and charged in absentia two Russian commanders responsible for the beheading of a Ukrainian POW on 17 June 2024 in the village of Staromaiorske, Donetsk Oblast.

The US and Ukraine signed a subsoil minerals agreement creating the "US-Ukraine Reconstruction Investment Fund".

Geo-located footage showed that Russian forces captured the rural settlement of Nove, northeast of Lyman.

== May 2025 ==
=== 1 May ===
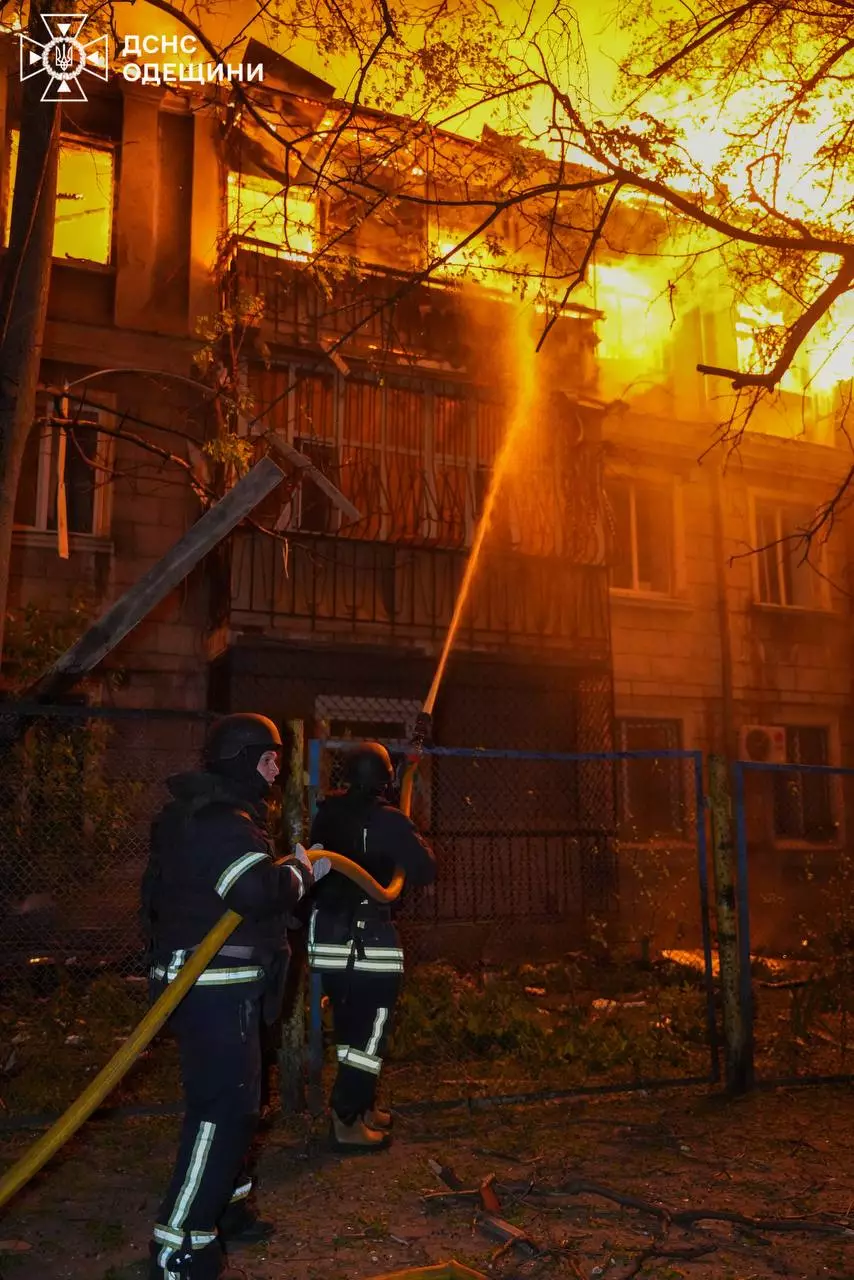
Residential building in Odesa after the strike

Two people were killed in a Russian drone strike on Odesa. One person was killed in a separate drone attack in Zaporizhzhia.

Russian-installed officials in Kherson Oblast claimed that seven people were killed in Ukrainian drone strikes on a market in Oleshky.

The Kyiv Post reported that the second Trump administration approved its first sale of weapons to Ukraine, worth at least US$50 million.

Ukrainian artillery destroyed a Russian Buk-M3 missile system and ammunition in an unspecified location.

The Supreme Court of Ukraine ruled against religious exemptions from military service during wartime following a case involving a member of the Jehovah's Witnesses who refused to undergo mobilization.

=== 2 May ===
Ukrainian drones struck airbases in Crimea and damaged a S-300V air defence system.

A "Russian space intelligence facility" in Stavropol Krai operated by the GRU was attacked by Ukrainian drones. Small arms fire was reported by locals and the regional governor said that drone fragments were found.

The US State Department approved a potential sale of $310.5 million to Ukraine to support and upgrade Ukraine's F-16s.

A Russian drone attack on Kharkiv wounded 46 people.

A Ukrainian HUR Magura V7 naval drone shot down two Russian Su-30s using AIM-9M Sidewinders, 50 km west of Novorossiysk, according to HUR commander Kyrylo Budanov. The crew of the first Su-30 ended up in the Black Sea, where a civilian ship later recovered them. The crew of the second Su-30 are believed to have perished.

=== 3 May ===
One person was killed in a Russian drone strike on Kherson.

Ukrainian drones, Neptune and Storm Shadow missiles attacked targets in the port of Novorossiysk and Crimea. Two fighter jets were destroyed on the ground in Crimea. In Novorossiysk four people were injured, while three apartment buildings and three grain tanks were damaged. Russian forces claimed to have destroyed "14 drone boats", shot down 170 UAVs, eight Storm Shadows and three Neptunes.

Russian forces claimed to have taken the villages of Mykhailivka, Lysivka and most of Myroliubivka, east of Myrnohrad.

=== 5 May ===
Three people were killed by Russian shelling in Bilopillia and Vorozhba in Sumy Oblast. One person was killed in a drone attack in Odesa Oblast.

Ukrainian drones struck targets in Moscow. Several airports were closed as a precaution. The governor of Kursk Oblast claimed that three people were killed in separate Ukrainian drone attacks in Shchegolek and Zvannoye.

=== 6 May ===
Three people were killed in a Russian missile attack in Sumy.

The residence of Ukrainian Eurovision 2025 contestant Khrystyna Starykova was destroyed by Russian shelling in Myrnohrad.

Russia and Ukraine conducted a prisoner exchange in which both sides released 205 prisoners each.

=== 7 May ===
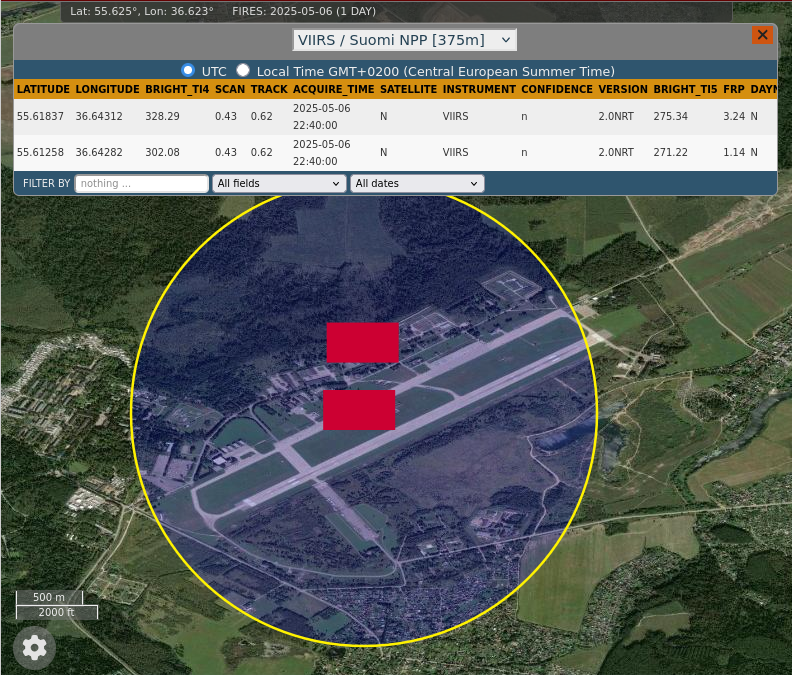
NASA's FIRMS detected fires at Kubinka air base on 6 May 2025 22:40:00 (UTC)

Two people were killed in a Russian drone strike on Kyiv.

Ukrainian drone attacks hit defense plants in Saransk and Tula and air bases in Shaikovka and Kubinka. The Russian defence ministry claimed that 524 drones were shot down overnight in the largest attack of its kind by Ukraine, causing flight disruptions in cities across western Russia.

Ukrainian forces crossed the Russian border to Tyotkino in Kursk Oblast, southwest of Glushkovo and occupied its south and southeastern areas.

Nick Parsons, a former Australian soldier, was killed while defusing a landmine in Izium.

=== 8 May ===
Ukrainian forces said that Russian forces continued their attacks despite the three-day truce announced by Russia, with one person killed by shelling in Sumy.

=== 9 May ===
The SBU announced the discovery and dismantling of a spy network operated by Hungarian intelligence in Zakarpattia Oblast that was operating against Ukraine, resulting in two arrests.

The US government approved a German transfer of 100 Patriot missiles and 125 artillery rockets to Ukraine.

During the 2025 Victory Day Parade Russia revealed the creation of the first drone unit modelled on Ukraine's Unmanned Systems Forces. Called the 7th Separate Regiment of the Unmanned Systems Troops, the unit operates Orlan-10, Orlan-30, ZALA, Lancet-51, Lancet-52, Garpiya, and Geran drones.

=== 10 May ===
The Russian MoD deployed MiG-35s for the "first known operational use" to defend Moscow from Ukrainian drones.

=== 11 May ===
Geo-located footage showed that Russian forces took the village of Novooleksandrivka, near Novopavlivka.

Ukrainian sources said that the Russian FSB Presidential Regiment was sent to reinforce the 98th Guards Airborne Division near Chasiv Yar.

=== 12 May ===
The HUR revealed that Russia is using a new cruise missile called S8000 Banderol, with the agency recovering electronic components from China, Japan, the US, and South Korea.

The Acting Governor of Kursk Oblast, Alexander Khinshtein, claimed a Ukrainian missile strike injured three people in Rylsk. Several cars and homes were damaged by shrapnel.

Russia launched 108 drones across Ukraine, with Ukrainian authorities reporting 22 injuries and damage in Odesa, Mykolaiv, Donetsk and Zhytomyr oblasts.

Geolocated footage showed that Russian forces took the rural settlement of Kotliarivka near Novopavlivka.

=== 13 May ===
The SBU arrested a former employee of the Rivne Nuclear Power Plant on suspicion of helping Russia launch drone strikes on power lines connecting the facility.

Ukrainian drones destroyed a Buk-M3 launcher and a BM-27 Uragan MLRS.

=== 14 May ===
Three people were killed in a Russian missile attack on Sumy.

The Estonian Navy attempted to seize the Russian-oil Tanker Jaguar which it claims to be a part of the Russian shadow fleet but was stopped after a Russian Su-35 flew over them and circled the vessel.

=== 15 May ===
Geolocated footage showed that Russian forces had taken the village of Vilne Pole, west of Velyka Novosilka.

The HUR captured a "cutting-edge" Russian CRAB drone detector and jammer in Kherson.

A Ukrainian Su-27 bombed a Russian command post in Lysychansk, Luhansk Oblast.

German police arrested three Ukrainians in Germany and Switzerland on suspicion of working for Russian intelligence and plotting to send explosive packages to Ukraine.

The commander of the 59th Assault Brigade of the Unmanned Systems Forces (which was deployed in Pokrovsk), Lieutenant Colonel Bohdan Shevchuk, was dismissed and replaced by Colonel Oleksandr Sak.

=== 16 May ===
A Ukrainian F-16 was shot down while "countering a Russian missile / UAV attack", making it the third such aircraft to be lost in the conflict. The pilot ejected and survived.

Atesh partisans set fire to a railway track near Smolensk.

A drone strike in Perevalne, Crimea destroyed an ammunition depot belonging to the 126th Coastal Defence Brigade.

The bodies of 909 Ukrainian soldiers killed in action were repatriated by Russia.

Ukraine and Russia held their first direct peace negotiations since 2022 in Istanbul, Turkey.

A Ukrainian FPV drone shot down a Russian Ka-52 somewhere over Ukraine.

The Russian defense ministry claimed that Russian forces took the villages of Novooleksandrivka, near Pokrovsk and Torske, near Lyman. Geolocated footage showed that Russian forces took the villages of Myroliubivka and Mykhailivka, near Mykolaivka.

Ukraine revealed a small laser turret, fitted to a remote controlled weapon station, capable of blinding optical sensors at 2 km and destroying drones at 800 meters.

=== 17 May ===
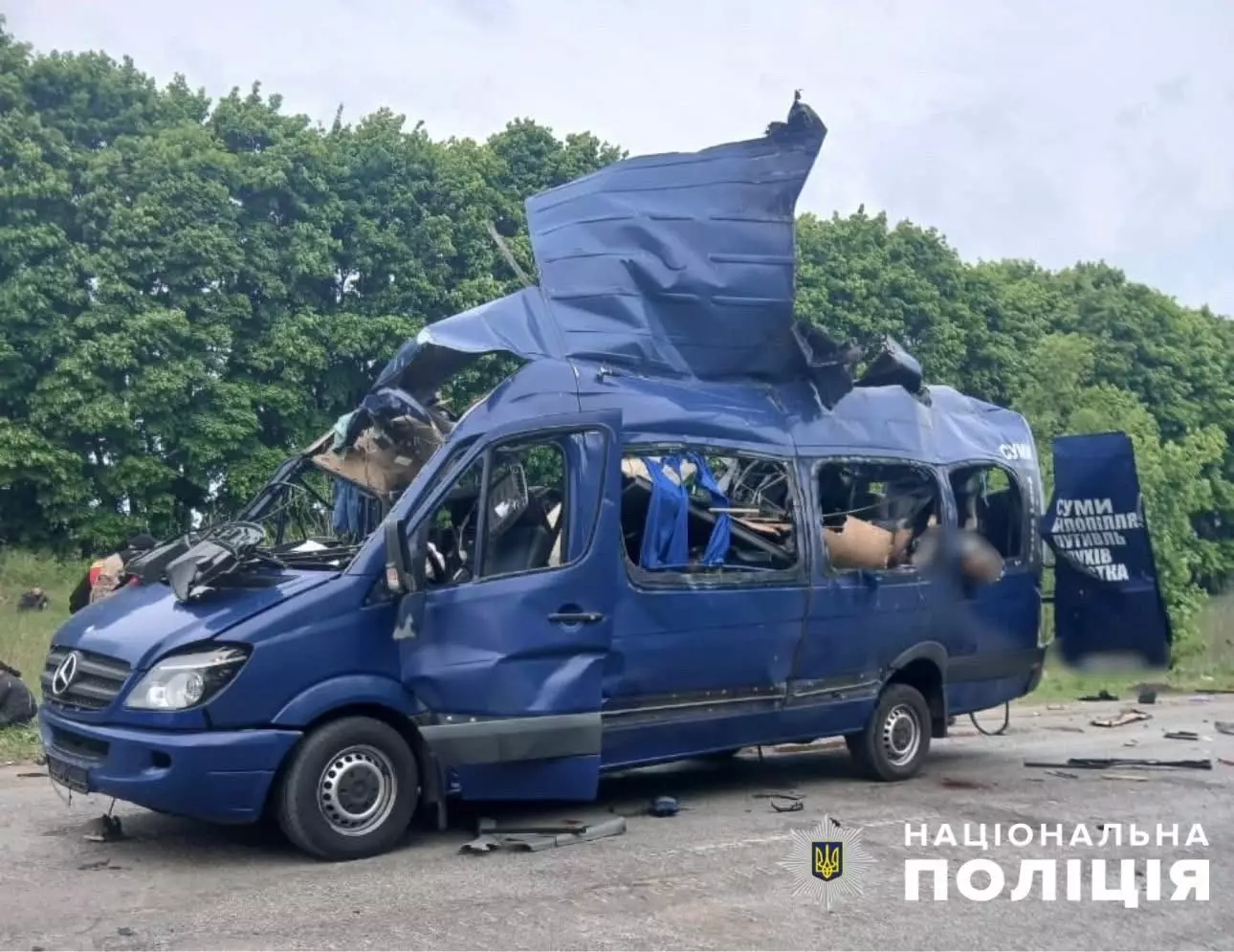
Minibus in Bilopillia after the attack

A Russian drone attack on a civilian minibus in Bilopillia killed nine people and injured seven more.

An Australian national, Oscar Jenkins, was convicted by a Luhansk court of fighting for Ukraine as a mercenary and sentenced to 13 years imprisonment.

Italy announced a military aid package of 400 M113 APCs and a satellite surveillance system to Ukraine.

The battalion commander of the 47th Separate Mechanized Brigade, Oleksandr Shyrshyn resigned from his post, criticizing the Ukrainian military leadership for its "stupid objectives" and "unnecessary casualties".

In the Pokrovsk sector, geolocated footage showed that Russian forces took the villages of Oleksandropil and Nova Poltavka while Russian milbloggers claimed that Russia took the village of Pishchane. Geolocated footage showed that Russian forces took the village of Bahatyr near Novopavlivka.

=== 18 May ===
In the largest known Russian drone attack since the full-scale war started in February 2022, some 273 drones targeted Kyiv, Dnipropetrovsk and Donetsk Oblasts, killing one woman and injuring three.

Belgium announced a military aid package for Ukraine valued at some €1 billion, including support for F-16s, rocket production and a prototype Leopard 1A5BE for testing.

=== 19 May ===
The SBU claimed to have launched drone strikes that destroyed a Russian Neva radar system and related logistical infrastructure that had been installed on Ukrainian offshore drilling rigs in the Black Sea.

The governor of Belgorod Oblast claimed that one person was killed in a Ukrainian drone strike in Shebekino.

The first batch of 49 ex-Australian M1A1 Abrams tanks were sent to Ukraine by sea.

The Russian defense ministry claimed that Russian forces took the village of Marine in Sumy Oblast.

Italy announced it was sending a third SAMP/T system to Ukraine.

=== 20 May ===
Ukraine formed its first motorcycle assault company as part of the Skala Regiment, being an "analogy" to similar Russian motorcycle units.

The National Guard of Ukraine reported that Russian missiles struck a Ukrainian shooting range at a training ground in Sumy Oblast, killing six soldiers and wounding over 10.

Four Chechen officers of the Russian Akhmat unit were killed in a car bombing in Skadovsk, Kherson Oblast.

=== 21 May ===
Ukraine launched a drone attack resulting in explosions in Tula, Ryazan, and Oryol oblasts. Russian officials claimed to have intercepted over 150 drones. The factories targeted, according to Ukrainian officials and sources, belonged to the Russian military-industrial complex, including a semiconductor plant in the town of Bolkhov. All Moscow airports ceased operations. In Tula the local Governor claimed a drone struck the roof of an apartment building and damaged other private and non-residential buildings.

=== 22 May ===
One person was killed and another person was injured in a "targeted" Ukrainian drone strike in Kamensky Khutor, Bryansk Oblast.

Deputy general director and chief designer of Kurganpribor, Andrey Kondratyev, who had been under EU and US sanctions for the firm's supplying of weapons to the Russian military, was seriously injured in a hammer attack.

=== 23 May ===
Over 100 drones targeted locations in Russia and Crimea. The Energia battery manufacturer in Lipetsk Oblast caught fire.

Two people were killed in a Russian missile attack on Odesa.

Russia and Ukraine conducted the first stage of a prisoner exchange agreed upon during the 16 May peace negotiations in Istanbul, with both sides exchanging 390 prisoners each.

A Russian fiber-optic drone operated by Rubicon took out a Ukrainian HIMARS rocket launcher system 10 kilometers away from Chasiv Yar.

Ukraine started using an analogue to a "Shahed-like" drone, called the Batyar with a range of 800 kilometres.

Geo-located footage showed that Russian forces took the rural settlement of Odradne, east of Komar. Russian milbloggers claimed that Russian forces seized the village of Zelene Pole, west of Novosilka.

=== 24 May ===
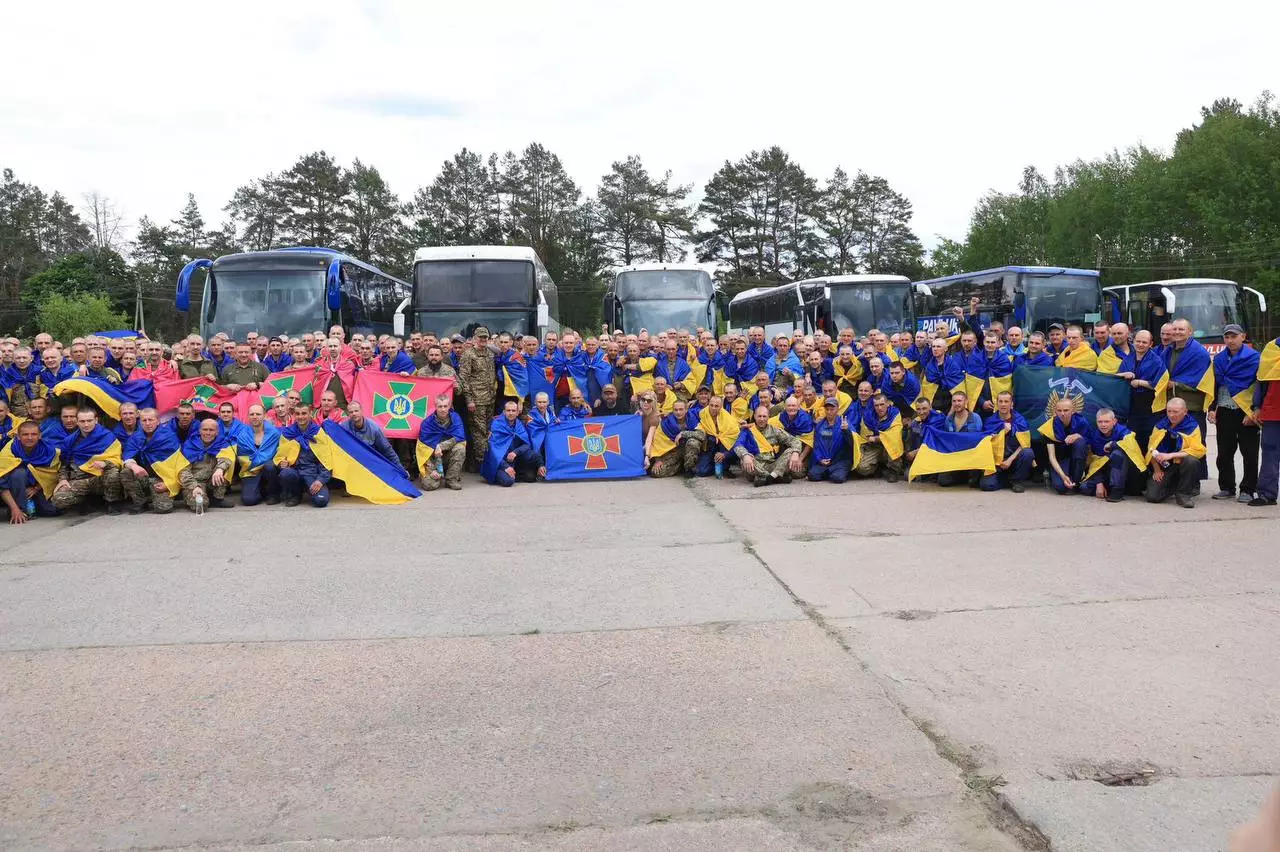
Ukrainian soldiers, returned during the exchange

Russian forces launched over 250 drones and 14 ballistic missiles on Kyiv, wounding 14 people.

Ukrainian drones attacked the Azot chemical plant in Novomoskovsk, Tula Oblast and the Energia factory in Yelets, for the second night in a row. Astra showed footage of smoke reportedly rising from the Azot plant. The only damage confirmed was a fire at a gas pipeline in Novomoskovsk that injured three people after being extinguished. The Russian MoD claimed to have shot down 104 drones over Belgorod, Bryansk, Lipetsk and Tula Oblasts.

Russia and Ukraine conducted the second stage of the prisoner exchange agreed upon during the 16 May peace negotiations in Istanbul, with both sides exchanging 307 prisoners each.

Geolocated footage showed that Russian forces took the town of Bohdanivka, near Novopavlivka. The Russian defense ministry claimed that Russian forces took the town of Stupochky, south of Chasiv Yar.

HUR drones destroyed three fuel tankers, using drones, on a train in the village of Novobohdanivka, Melitopol.

=== 25 May ===
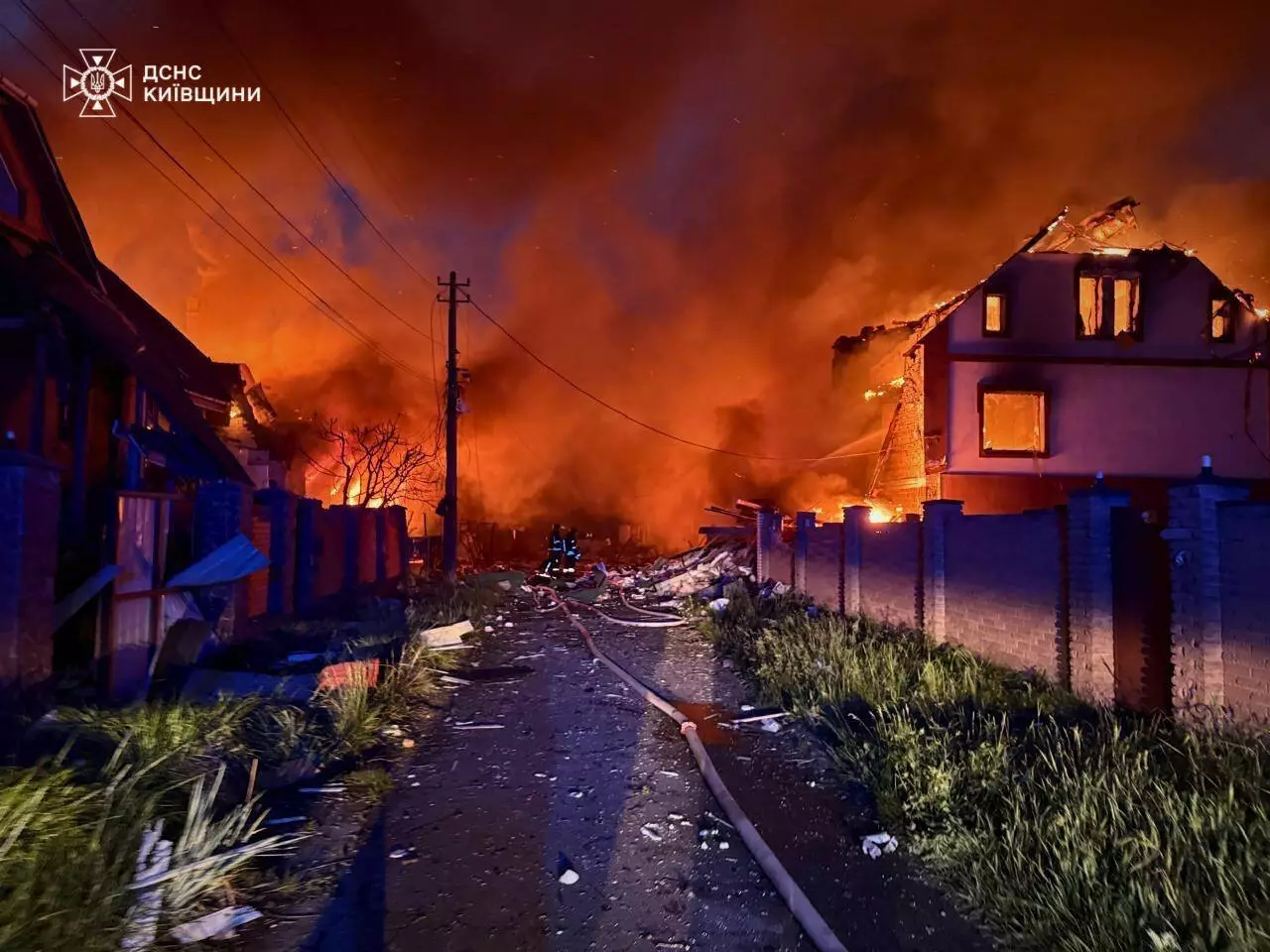
Street in Markhalivka (Kyiv Oblast), destroyed by the attack

Russia launched its largest air attack on Ukraine since the 2022 invasion, with 298 drones and 69 missiles according to the Ukrainian Air Force, killing 14 people and injuring 70 others across 13 regions including Kyiv.

Russia and Ukraine conducted the third and final stage of the prisoner exchange agreed upon during the 16 May peace negotiations in Istanbul, with both sides exchanging 303 prisoners each.

Ukrainian drones struck Migalovo air base, Tver Oblast. Fire and smoke was reported by the locals, the local governor denied any damage occurred and claimed all drones were intercepted.

Geolocated footage showed that Russian forces took the village of Romanivka, west of Toretsk and also likely took the towns of Stara Mykolaivka and Hnativka.

=== 26 May ===
Russia launched another wave of aerial attacks across Ukraine overnight, killing six people. Ukraine claimed that Russia launched 355 drones and nine missiles.

Ukrainian drones struck a Shahed factory in the Alabuga Special Economic Zone in Yelabuga, Tatarstan. A surface to air missile was fired during the attack, while locals reported explosions to independent media channel Astra. Ukrainian drones also attacked the Dmitrievsky Chemical Plant in Ivanovo Oblast, with two explosions being reported by residents.

Geolocated footage showed that Russian forces took the town of Bilovody on the Sumy Front.

=== 27 May ===
Atesh partisans disabled a Russian railway cabinet in Yasnogorsk, Tula Oblast, causing delays to trains loaded with equipment headed towards Russian forces in Kursk Oblast.

Ukraine unveiled an AI operated turret, called SkySentinel, fitted to a M2 Browning machine gun that shot down its first Shahed drone without human input.

Russia fired 60 drones towards Ukraine overnight.

=== 28 May ===
Ukrainian drones struck a technopark in Zelenograd, Moscow Oblast. According to Moscow Mayor Sergey Sobyanin and Astra, a fire broke out and a building was damaged.

Russian forces claimed to have taken the villages of Vodolahy and Kostiantynivka in Sumy Oblast and Stroivka in Kharkiv Oblast.

Ukrainian drones claimed to have struck a Russian tank at a distance 42 km using a fibre optic drone. A second drone confirmed the strike by the 414th Strike UAV Brigade

=== 29 May ===
Major Zaur Gurtsiyev, who oversaw Russian air operations during the siege of Mariupol before becoming deputy mayor of Stavropol, was killed in a grenade explosion that also killed another person.

Twelve Russian soldiers were awarded 15 million rubles ($195,000) for their part in shooting down the first Ukrainian F-16. TASS claimed the F-16 was shot down by a "combination of ground-based air defense systems". Ukraine did not confirm the story and TASS gave limited details.

Ukrainian military observer Kostyantyn Mashovets confirmed Russian control over the villages of Kostyantynivka and Volodymyrivka. Geolocated footage showed that Russian forces captured the towns of Stroivka, near Topoli and Ridkodub, north of Lyman. Russian forces claimed to have taken the town of Shevchenko Pershe, northwest of Pokrovsk.

=== 30 May ===
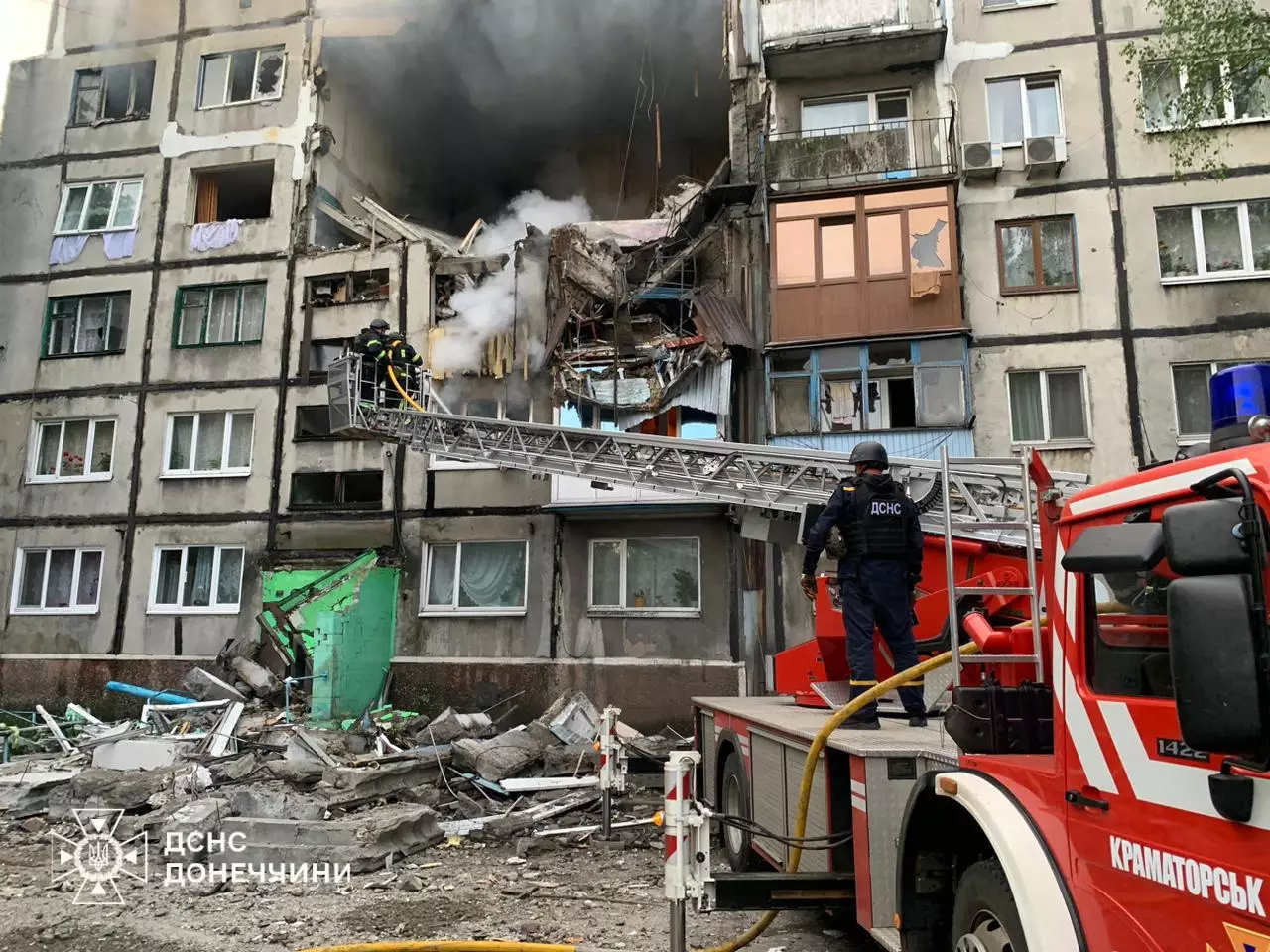
Apartment building in Bilozerske (Donetsk Oblast) after drone attack on 30 May

The Russian defense ministry claimed that Russian forces took the town of Kindrashivka, north of Kupiansk.

The governor of Belgorod Oblast claimed that one person was killed in a Ukrainian drone strike on a car in Logachevka.

A HUR source claimed responsibility for two explosions near Desantnaya Bay in Vladivostok targeting the command post and barracks of the 47th Separate Air Assault Battalion of the 155th Guards Naval Infantry Brigade. The Russian Anti-Terrorist Commission of Primorsky Krai claimed the explosion was caused by "propane-butane cylinders" igniting.

=== 31 May ===
One person was killed in a Russian missile attack in Dolynka, Zaporizhzhia Oblast. Another was killed by shelling in Kherson.

Ukrainian drones struck "multiple locations" in Kursk Oblast, according to acting governor Alexander Khinshtein. He claimed that 10 civilians were injured when a building was struck, however media and Ukrainian analysts confirmed that the locations targeted were occupied by Russian soldiers.

Ukrainian authorities ordered the evacuation of 11 villages (Note: Horobivka (Richky Hromada) Shtanivka, Voronivka and Yanchenky (Bilopillia Hromada) Tsymbalivka and Shkurativka (Vorozhba Hromada) Krovne, Mykolaivka, Rudnivka, Spaske and Kapitanivka (Mykolaivka Hromada)) in Sumy Oblast due to increased Russian attacks.

Five Russian drones struck a farm in a village in Romny, Sumy Oblast, setting fires to farm buildings, killed hundreds of domestic animals and destroyed dozens of tonnes of grain. Another drone struck a car delivering bread in Nedryhailiv.

The Russian Defense Ministry claimed that Russian forces took the village of Oleksiivka in the Sumy Front. Geolocated footage showed that Russian forces took the village of Novopil, west of Velyka Novosilka.

== See also ==
- 2025 in Russia
- 2025 in Ukraine
- Outline of the Russo-Ukrainian War
- List of wars involving Russia
- List of wars involving Ukraine
