= Kursk campaign =

Military campaign in Russia's Kursk Oblast during Russia-Ukraine war

- Part of Attacks in Russia during the Russo-Ukrainian war
- Claimed extent of Ukrainian-held areas as of 28 April 2025
Date	6 August 2024 – March 2025
Location	Kursk Oblast, Russia
Result	See § Analysis
Territorial changes	Russian forces regain control over most of the territory held by Ukraine in Kursk Oblast; Russian offensive into neighbouring Sumy Oblast

Belligerents
Ukraine	Russia; North Korea (Note: From November 2024)

Commanders and leaders
(Ukraine) Oleksandr Syrskyi (Ukraine) Eduard Moskaliov (Ukraine) Pavlo Rozlach (Ukraine) Dmytro Voloshyn	(Russia) Andrey Belousov (Russia) Valery Gerasimov (Russia) Yunus-Bek Yevkurov (Russia) Aleksey Dyumin (Russia) Alexander Bortnikov (Russia) Apti Alaudinov

Units involved
Order of battle	Order of battle

Strength
Western estimate: 10,000–15,000 soldiers and 600 armored vehicles (14 August 2024); 15,000–30,000 soldiers (16 August 2024)	Per Ukraine: (Russia) 45,000 soldiers (6 November 2024) (Russia) (North Korea) 78,000 soldiers (8 February 2025) (North Korea) 14,061 soldiers (total) Western estimate: (Russia) 40,000 soldiers (12 October 2024) (North Korea) 12,000 soldiers

Casualties and losses
Per OSINT: c. 790 pieces of equipment: 55–73 tanks; Several Stryker armoured fighting vehicles; Several surface-to-air missile systems; 1 M142 HIMARS; Per Russia: 74,000+ casualties 100 captured 2,915 pieces of equipment Per UALosses: 6,601 killed 11,377 missing 687 captured	Per OSINT: c. 740 pieces of equipment: 66–80 tanks; 2 Ka-52 helicopters; 115–247+ captured Per Ukraine: (Russia) 77,000 killed or wounded 7,236 pieces of equipment (Note: Including 211 tanks, 1,083 armored vehicles, 907 artillery systems, one aircraft, three helicopters, 15 air defense systems, and 2,795 vehicles.); 1,018 captured 931 tactical and strategic UAVs (North Korea) 2,251 killed, 4,807 wounded Per South Korea: (North Korea) 6,000 killed or wounded, 2 captured Per BBC News analysis: (North Korea) 2,304 killed
- Per Russia: 358 civilians killed, 503 injured and 789 civilians missing 144,000+ civilians evacuated (133,000+ evacuated in Kursk Oblast and 11,000+ evacuated in Belgorod Oblast)

On 6 August 2024, during the Russo-Ukrainian war, the Armed Forces of Ukraine launched an incursion into Russia's Kursk Oblast and clashed with the Russian Armed Forces and Russian border guard. A state of emergency was declared in Kursk Oblast, and Russian reserves were rushed to the area. By the end of the first week, the Ukrainian military said it had captured 1,000 km^{2} (390 sq mi) of Russian territory, while Russian authorities acknowledged that Ukraine had captured 28 settlements.

In the second half of August the front stabilized, and in early October, the Ukrainian advance had stalled. From November, North Korean forces were sent to the province to support the Russian military. By the end of that month, Russian forces recaptured around half of the territory Ukraine had occupied. By 11 March 2025, most of the Ukrainian forces appeared to have retreated as a result of a Russian counterattack. Russian troops entered Sudzha, around which a shrinking pocket of territory still controlled by Ukraine had formed, the next day.

Ukrainian officials said the goals of the operation included inflicting damage on Russia's military, capturing Russian troops, pushing Russian artillery further out of range, hindering Russian supply lines and diverting their forces from other fronts. It also aimed to put pressure on the Russian government and force it into "fair" peace negotiations. By the end of August, the operation began to be criticized for diverting Ukrainian forces from the east, stretching Ukraine's personnel along the front and allowing Russia to advance toward Pokrovsk. The Institute for the Study of War reported that Russia had moved forces from "lower-priority" areas, but not from Donetsk Oblast.

The Ukrainian incursion into Kursk surprised Russia, some of Ukraine's allies, and many in the Ukrainian elite. It is the most significant attack across the border since the 2022 Russian invasion of Ukraine, and the first carried out primarily by Ukrainian regular forces. Earlier smaller incursions into Russia by pro-Ukrainian forces had taken place with Ukraine supporting them but denying explicit involvement.

Western analysts differed in their assessment of the outcome of the Ukrainian offensive, with defence researcher Marina Miron viewing it as a strategic failure for Ukraine, Markus Reisner taking the view that a correct assessment of the battle could only be given after the total withdrawal of Ukrainian forces from Kursk to determine the losses incurred, and former military advisor Nico Lange viewing it as a success. Land warfare expert Nick Reynolds said that Ukraine had held the Sudzha pocket for a "remarkable" amount of time, and that the Ukrainian offensive had had a "shaping effect on Russian thinking".

== Background ==
There have been attacks in mainland Russia as a result of the Russo-Ukrainian war since its invasion of Ukraine on 24 February 2022. The main targets have been the military, the arms industry and the oil industry. Many of the attacks have been drone strikes, firebombing, and rail sabotage. The Ukrainian intelligence services have acknowledged carrying out some of these attacks. Others have been carried out by anti-war activists in Russia. There have also been cross-border shelling, missile strikes, and covert raids from Ukraine, mainly in Belgorod, Kursk, and Bryansk oblasts. Several times, Ukrainian-based paramilitaries launched incursions into Russia, captured border villages and battled the Russian military. These were carried out by units made up mainly of Russian emigrants. While Ukraine supported these ground incursions, it denied direct involvement.

Captured Russian military documents reviewed by The Guardian contained internal warnings about a Ukrainian cross-border operation in the area months before it took place. Unit commanders were warned in February that the Ukrainian military was planning a "rapid push" from the Sumy Oblast into Russian territory up to a depth of 80 kilometres (50 mi). More specifically, a document dated mid-June warned of Ukrainian plans to conduct an operation from the direction of Yunakivka, with the aim of taking control of Sudzha.

Russia's military chief Valery Gerasimov reportedly ignored intelligence warnings that Ukrainian troops were massing near the Russia–Ukraine border. Bloomberg reported that Russian intelligence had warned of a possible invasion of the Kursk region two weeks in advance. According to Bloomberg, citing "a person close to the Kremlin", Putin was not informed of the threat.

All legal national borders of Russia are controlled by the FSB Border Guard under the command of FSB director Alexander Bortnikov. Most of the men guarding the border in Kursk Oblast were young, inexperienced conscripts, lightly equipped army infantry units, and the National Guard (Rosgvardiya). Some of the conscripts were unarmed.

=== Preparations ===
Ukraine's military intelligence agency had begun preparing for the operation in Kursk by March 2024.

In late June 2024, Oleksandr Syrskyi, Ukraine's commander-in-chief, gave orders to the commanders of Ukraine's 80th and 82nd Air Assault Brigades, according to the 82nd's commander, Dmytro Voloshyn.

Andrii Krysiuk, the 82nd Brigade's chief of staff, said that the planning for the operation took place among a limited circle of people in rooms without any telephones, in order to maintain secrecy.

Units of the 80th, 82nd, and the 22nd Mechanized Brigade were moved discreetly from other fronts into the Sumy Oblast as early as mid-July, under the pretenses of training and picking up new equipment. Officers were told to avoid wearing military uniforms when entering Ukrainian towns and cities, in order not to draw attention. The military buildup was noticed by Ukrainian civilians in the village of Khotin and the Yunakivka district. The paratroopers of the 80th Brigade reportedly trained for several weeks to prepare for the operation, including in mock terrain made to resemble villages in Kursk Oblast.

Units of the 95th Air Assault Brigade were informed in late July about the operation, about a week before it began, as they were being redeployed from the Toretsk front, and were given three days to train and prepare.

Pavlo Rozlach, the commander of the 80th Brigade, said that his unit had begun infiltrating into Kursk Oblast on 4 August with the help of the Ukrainian Special Operations Forces. Groups of six soldiers were deployed and were hidden in forests in preparation for the main assault on 6 August.

The Ukrainian incursion was preceded by artillery shelling and drone strikes during the night of 5–6 August.

== Timeline ==
=== August 2024: Ukrainian offensive ===
==== 6 August ====
On 6 August 2024, Russia reportedly deployed air and artillery forces to counter a Ukrainian border incursion in Kursk Oblast. Ukrainian fighters, equipped with tanks and armored vehicles, crossed into Russian territory. The Russian Ministry of Defense responded by sending troops and aviation units to the area. According to Russia, the incursion involved around 300 Ukrainian troops, 11 tanks, and over 20 armored combat vehicles, and was aimed in two directions: at Oleshnya in the direction of Sudzha, east-northeast of Sumy, and towards Nikolayevo-Darino, north-northeast of Sumy. It was reported that Chechen Akhmat battalions were responding to the raids, though these claims remained unverified as of 13 September 2024.

The attack began at 08:00 MSK. A statement by Russian forces on Telegram at around 18:20, claiming that they had pushed the Ukrainians back across the border, and inflicted significant losses through artillery, air strikes, and drones, was later edited by them to imply fighting was ongoing. Moscow released videos purportedly showing Ukrainian tanks being targeted from the air. Social media footage suggested Russian warplanes operated at low altitudes over Kursk Oblast to repel the attack. Alexei Smirnov, acting governor of Kursk Oblast, reported that three people died during the events: a woman in the border incursion and two individuals in separate drone attacks. Russian milbloggers also largely dismissed the supposed raids as "unsuccessful" and a "media stunt".

According to Russia, at least 1,000 troops crossed the border on the first day, supported by tanks and armored vehicles. According to Andrzej Wilk of the Centre for Eastern Studies, the entire Ukrainian grouping, including some elements which did not cross over into Russia, consisted of an estimated 2,000 men from Ukraine's 22nd and 82nd Brigades, supported by artillery and air defense sub-units. It was later claimed by members of the Ukrainian military that the breakthrough on the border was conducted by the 80th and 82nd Air Assault Brigades.

Russian milbloggers claimed that the offensive was being performed by the Russian Volunteer Corps (RVC), while the New Voice of Ukraine citing a source in Ukraine's Main Military Intelligence reported that the RVC was not present.

==== 7 August ====
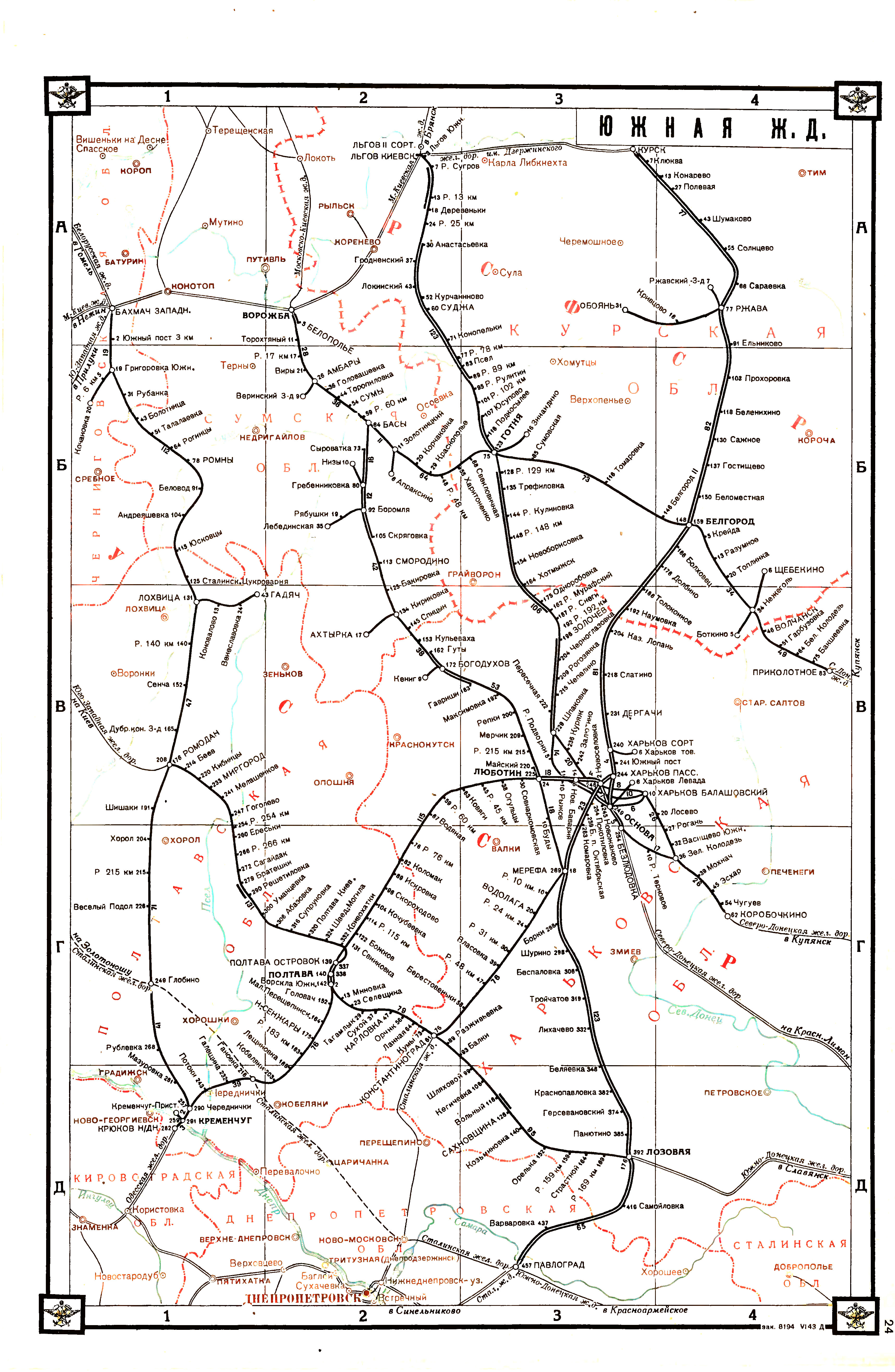
1943 Ukrainian railway map shows Sudzha in quadrant A2 at km 60 on the Lgov–Gotnya–Zolochiv main line to Kharkiv

A milblogger claimed that Ukrainian forces had captured 11 settlements and had advanced 14 kilometres (9 mi) deep into the oblast. Government agencies were ordered by President Vladimir Putin to "provide the needed assistance to residents", and deputy prime minister Denis Manturov was sent to oversee their work. Kursk Oblast was placed under a state of emergency by governor Smirnov.

Putin met with key members of the security establishment including Valery Gerasimov, Alexander Bortnikov, Sergei Shoigu and Andrey Belousov on the Kursk incursion. Gerasimov told Putin that about 1,000 Ukrainian soldiers took part in the attack and that their advance had been halted.

Geolocated footage confirmed that Ukrainian forces had advanced at least 10 kilometres (6.2 mi) across the Russian border, having penetrated at least two Russian defensive lines and a stronghold. Russian sources indicated that Ukrainian forces were trying to advance along the 38K-030 Sudzha-Korenevo highway, and a prominent Kremlin-affiliated milblogger claimed that by 18:00 local time on 7 August, Ukrainian forces had advanced both northwest and southeast along the highway and were now fighting on the outskirts of Korenevo and Sudzha. Additionally, geolocated footage showed four Ukrainian personnel capturing at least 40 Russian POWs, as well as fighting within city limits of Sudzha, with Ukrainian forces capturing a gas-station and the entry check-point. The previous day, 35 Russian servicemen were claimed to have been captured by Ukrainian forces after failing to prevent a breakthrough. Meanwhile, a Ukrainian lieutenant claimed that 300 Russian soldiers had been captured in the "Kursk People's Republic" during two days; he referred to the Ukrainian forces operating there as "a contingent of unidentified armed formations".

Ukrainian MP Oleksiy Goncharenko reported that Ukrainian forces had captured the Sudzha gas hub which feeds the Urengoy–Pomary–Uzhhorod pipeline into the rest of Europe. Additionally, there were reports of fighting in Ivnitsa, a village 24 km (15 mi) from the border. Russian sources claimed that Ukrainian forces had reached the village of Darino.

==== 8 August ====
RIA Novosti reported that four people died as a result of 'attacks' by the AFU in the oblast as fighting continued for the third day. Pro-Russian milblogger Yuri Podolyaka said that "Sudzha is basically lost to us" and that Ukrainian forces were pushing towards Lgov.

Ukrainian forces were in control of the western part of Sudzha and the surrounding roads; skirmishes continued in the town.

According to Smirnov, the acting governor of Kursk Oblast, six Ukrainian drones and five missiles were shot down during the night and morning.

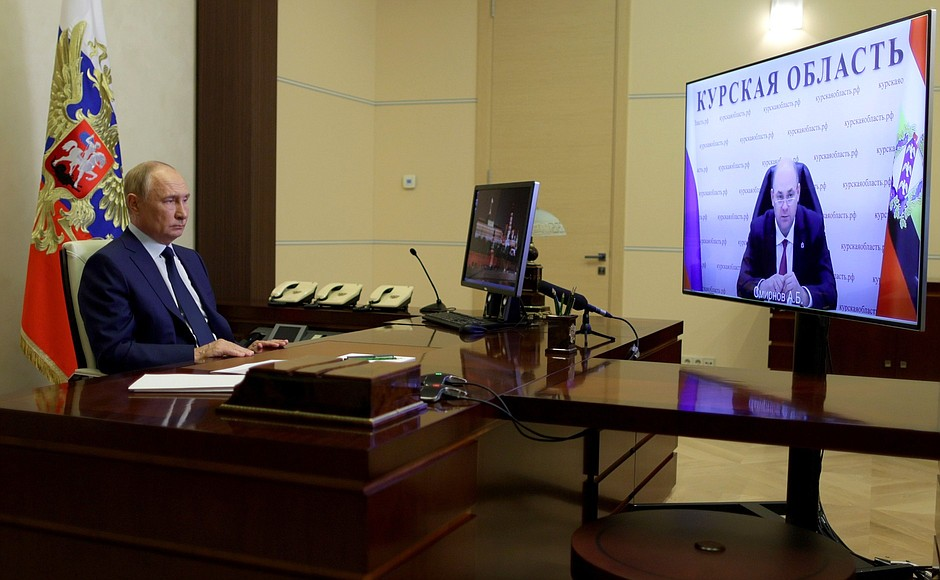
Vladimir Putin talks with Alexei Smirnov, the acting governor of Kursk, about the situation regarding the Ukrainian incursion. 8 August 2024.

Reports claimed that the combat zone had expanded to 430 square kilometers, and claimed that Ukrainian forces entered the settlement of Mirny and had taken control of the villages of Kazachya Loknya, Bogdanovka, 1st Knyazhiy and 2nd Knyazhiy. Skirmishes took place in the village of Snagost. Ukrainian troops were present in areas 35 kilometers from the Ukrainian border.

==== 9 August ====
Reports claimed that Ukrainian troops had captured around 100–200 square kilometers of territory, at a depth of around 10 kilometers on average. Based on independent and own analyses, CNN put the area of territory over which Russia had lost control at 250 square kilometers at least.

A convoy of Russian troops was reportedly destroyed in a HIMARS strike in the village of Oktyabrskoye while moving along the route connecting Glushkovsky District and Kursk and passing through Rylsky and Lgovsky districts. Footage of the aftermath showed 15 burned military trucks, with some bodies inside. According to the Ukrainian analyst group NEXTA, "each of these trucks can carry up to 35 fully equipped soldiers. The video shows 14 destroyed vehicles, which suggests that the Russian army could have lost between 200 and 490 soldiers in one night as a result of the strike... This could become one of the largest one-time losses for the Russian army since the beginning of the full-scale war". A Russian Telegram channel wrote: "They were armed, most likely a platoon per vehicle. 3-4 companies – an entire battalion was destroyed. Judging by the appearance of the column, about half were killed. This is one of the bloodiest and most massive strikes (most likely Himars) in the entire war."

Apti Alaudinov, the commander of the Chechen Akhmat units that had been stationed in Belgorod and Kursk since the last incursion, informed Russian media that he and his forces did not engage Ukrainian troops as they passed their positions, instead opting to retreat until more Russian reinforcements could arrive, while some Russian milbloggers claimed they fled from the battle. Alaudinov had at that point in time been the only Russian commander to admit that Ukrainian forces were in control of settlements along the border.

In anticipation of Russian airstrikes, 20,000 people were ordered to evacuate from Sumy Oblast. Russian reinforcements, many of which were units already deployed around the Russia–Ukraine border, continued to arrive near the frontline in Kursk Oblast, where fighting persisted over Sudzha.

The Russian MOD published a report on the transfer of a military column from Belgorod Oblast to Sudzhansky District, which included 152-mm self-propelled "Msta-S" artillery pieces and combat support vehicles. Combat markings showed that Russian command was transferring battle-hardened troops to Kursk Oblast as reinforcement.

The head of the Kurchatov municipal administration, Igor Korpunkov, reported that the fighting was taking place 30 kilometers from Kursk Nuclear Power Plant. Authorities blocked all access to the nuclear plant, construction workers at the site left the area, and equipment at the plant was deenergized. Rosatom announced a temporary reduction in the number of personnel at the site. Around 15:00, an explosion was heard in Kurchatov. Russian NBC Protection Troops were also deployed to protect the plant.

Governor of Kursk Oblast Alexey Smirnov reported that a fire started in one of the districts as a result of an attack by the Ukrainian Armed Forces on a transformer substation. As a result of the UAV attack, Kurchatov, as well as parts of the Kurchatovsky, Oktyabrsky, Bolshesoldatsky, Oboyansky and Belovsky districts, were left without power supply.

A counter-terrorism operational regime under the Federal Security Service, headed by Alexander Bortnikov, was introduced in Kursk, Bryansk and Belgorod Oblasts to temporarily take control of the regions till the conditions return to normalcy. This meant that movement was restricted, vehicles could be seized, and phone calls could be monitored, among other measures.

The number of Ukrainian troops in Kursk Oblast was estimated by CEIP senior fellow Dara Massicot to be around 10,000–12,000, containing elements from four to five Ukrainian brigades.

==== 10 August ====
According to analysts cited by The New York Times, the Ukrainian advance in Kursk Oblast had largely been stopped by Russian reinforcements at this point, and the situation stabilized, but Ukrainian forces continued to hold on to their captured territory. Conversely, other sources such as the Washington Post and Frankfurter Rundschau reported that Russia remained unable to control the situation, with continued Ukrainian advances. The Russian Ministry of Defense made similar claims that they had stopped any Ukrainian advances in Kursk Oblast. Russian authorities introduced a "counter-terrorist operation" regime in Kursk Oblast.

Battles were reported in Olgovka near Korenevo, the Ivashkovskoye farmstead, and Malaya Loknya.

On 10 August, Ukraine's 95th Air Assault Brigade entered Kursk Oblast, and was given the task of conducting assaults and mop-up operations around Malaya Loknya and Pogrebki.

The Russian Armed Forces claimed to have regained control of the village of Makhnovka east of Sudzha. Reports claimed that the combat zone had expanded to 650 km^{2} (250 sq mi).

In the evening, Kursk Oblast governor Smirnov said that 15 people were injured in Kursk city after the wreckage of an intercepted Ukrainian missile fell onto a residential area.

Soldiers of Ukraine's 252nd Territorial Defense Battalion published footage from Poroz, a border village in Belgorod Oblast.

==== 11 August ====
On the night of 11 August, the Ukrainian Armed Forces entered Belovsky District, located southeast of Sudzhansky District, which was confirmed by the head of the district and the acting governor. The head of the district asked those who had evacuated not to return.

Proekt claimed that the combat zone had increased to 720 km^{2} (280 sq mi).

An armored Ukrainian column crossed into Belgorod Oblast at the village of Kolotilovka, immediately coming under attack by artillery and drones, but ultimately advancing 6 miles (9.7 km) into Russian territory with heavy casualties.

==== 12 August ====
Russian authorities began evacuating civilians from Krasnoyaruzhsky District in Belgorod Oblast because of the widening Ukrainian offensive. Krasnoyaruzhsky is immediately south of Kursk Oblast, and also borders Ukraine.

Russian authorities confirmed that Ukrainians had gained control of at least 28 settlements, while Ukrainian OSINT claimed that Ukrainians had control of 44 settlements and were contesting another 10 settlements. The Commander-in-Chief of the Armed Forces of Ukraine, Oleksandr Syrskyi said that his forces control over 1,000 km^{2} (390 sq mi) of Russian territory.

Ukrainian soldiers published a video of themselves driving through the center of Sudzha claiming that the city center was under the control of the Ukrainian Armed Forces.

==== 13 August ====
According to reports that were not immediately confirmed but deemed credible by Western observers, Putin placed Alexey Dyumin in command of the defense against the Ukrainian offensive.

According to Ukraine a "relatively small" number of Russian troops were relocated to Kursk from Zaporizhzhia and Kherson, with the Russian offensives in the latter two regions continuing. In his evening address, Ukrainian president Volodymyr Zelenskyy said that his forces were in control of roughly 1,000 square kilometres and 74 settlements inside Kursk Oblast. In a meeting with Zelenskyy, Lithuanian minister of defense Laurynas Kasčiūnas claimed that Russia relocated some of its troops from its Baltic exclave of Kaliningrad to Kursk, without going into further details.

The Russian defence ministry claimed to have thwarted Ukrainian assaults in Korenevsky District near the villages of Obshchy Kolodez, Kauchuk, Alekseyevsky, and Snagost and in Sudzhansky District in the direction of Martynovka, and also in the areas of Korenevo, Oleshnya, Nikolayevo-Darino, Sudzha, and Mikhaylovka.

==== 14 August ====
Russia accused Ukraine of carrying out a massive air and drone attack on Kursk, Voronezh, Belgorod, Nizhny Novgorod, Volgograd, Bryansk, Oryol, and Rostov Oblasts, adding that it had shot down 117 drones and four missiles.

Ukrainian state television aired a report claiming that Sudzha was under Ukrainian control and showing Ukrainian soldiers removing the Russian flag from an official building. Ukrainian forces were also shown delivering humanitarian aid to civilians in the town. However, Apti Alaudinov claimed that fighting in the town was ongoing.

Ukraine claimed to have captured 102 Russian soldiers in less than 24 hours, reportedly from the 488th Guards Regiment and the "Akhmat" Battalions, with Zelenskyy claiming the day before that "hundreds" had so far surrendered during the offensive. According to the state security service of Ukraine, this was the largest single surrender of Russian troops so far.

Ukraine reportedly attempted to advance in three directions: east from Sudzha toward the village of Belitsa and the neighboring settlement of Giri, north towards Lgov, and northwest towards Korenevo on the road to Rylsk. A fierce battle was reported near the settlement of Kauchuk, approximately 30 kilometers from Lgov. Russian forces dug new trenches south of Lgov and in Chermoshnoy. Ukrainian forces claimed to have advanced 1–2 kilometers and completed clearance of Sudzha.

Cherkasskaya Konopelka, to the south of Sudzha, was reportedly captured by Ukraine, while the village of Kurilovka, the hamlet of Dmitryukov and the villages of Borki and Krupets were also reportedly occupied. Ukrainian troops entered the village of Kamyshnoye where an urban battle was reported. The town of Glushkovo was ordered evacuated by governor Smirnov, with the evacuation of the entire surrounding Glushkovsky District of Kursk Oblast also begun that same day.

==== 15 August ====
Ukrainian military commander Oleksandr Syrskyi announced the establishment of a military administration to be headed by General Eduard Moskaliov, adding that 82 settlements in the oblast were now under Kyiv's control. In his evening address, Zelenskyy said that Ukrainian forces had taken full control of Sudzha.

The Russian MOD claimed to have recaptured the village of Krupets. It also confirmed that the Ukrainian Armed Forces had advanced approximately two kilometers.

Ukraine lost a HIMARS launcher in a missile strike in Sumy Oblast.

==== 16 August ====
It was reported that Russia was hiring trench diggers to build defences with wages of around US$2,500 a month, or more, with the promise of working outside combat zones. Satellite images showed the expansion of Russian trenchlines in the region.

The major road bridge over the Seym River in Glushkovo was destroyed by the Ukrainian military, approximately 50 kilometers west of the Russian territory then controlled by Ukraine. Russian officials said that the loss of the bridge would hinder the relocation via land routes of civilians in the district. Approximately 2,000 to 3,000 Russian conscripts were trapped in a pocket south of the river.

==== 17 August ====
Russian forces reportedly blew up two bridges near Tyotkino and Popovo-Lezhachi after withdrawing from the right bank of the Seym River in the area.

The Ukrainian military claimed the capture of the settlement of Korenevo but the Russian MOD described the settlement as contested.

==== 18 August ====
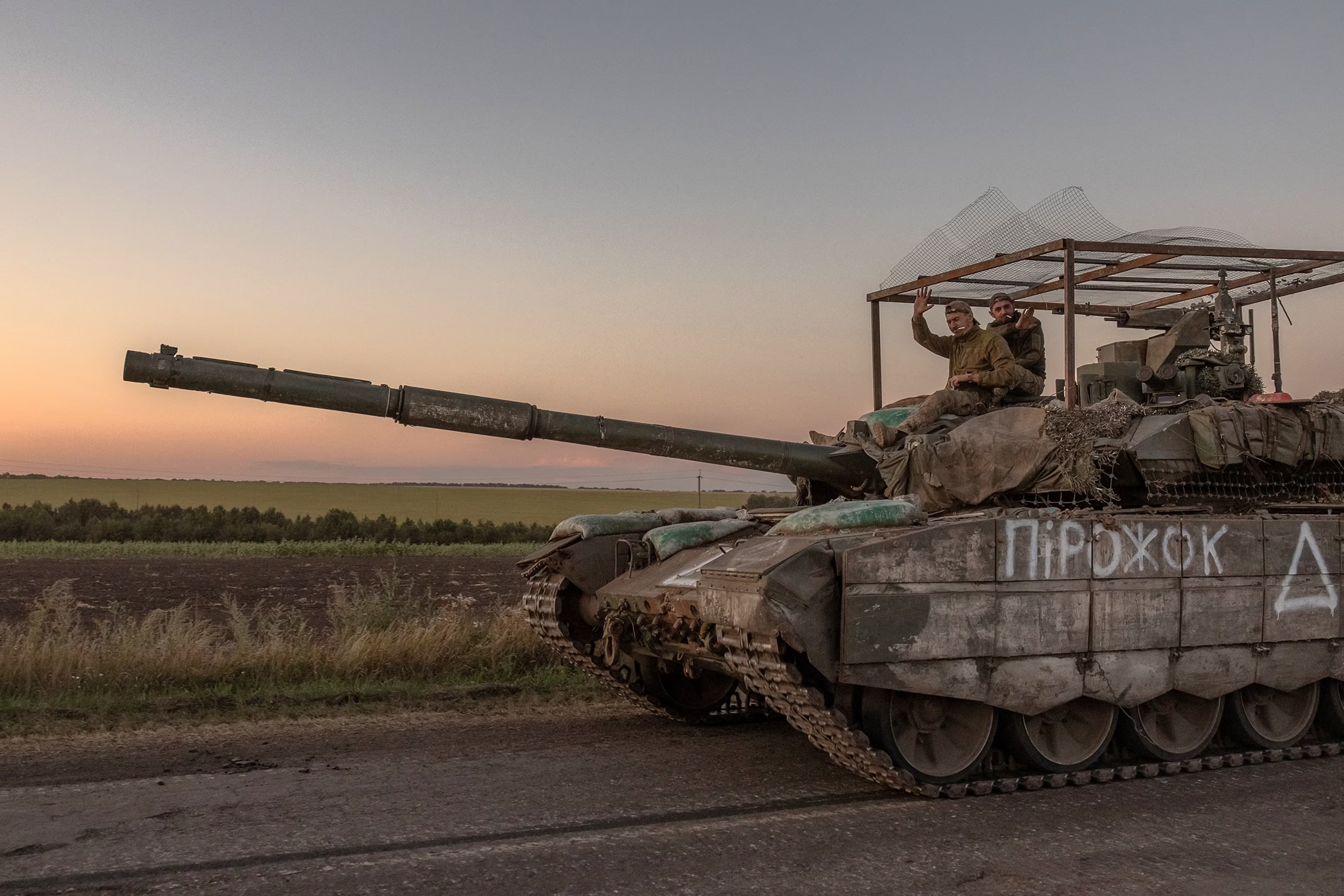
Ukrainian soldiers with a captured Russian T-90M Proryv tank

Ukrainian forces destroyed another bridge over the Seym river near Zvannoye.

According to Russian bloggers, both Ukraine and Russia reinforced their forces battling in Kursk Oblast, with Russia moving some forces from other fronts to the front.

Marines from the 501st Separate Naval Infantry Battalion posted a video of them tearing down the Russian flag from the municipal building of Apanasovka.

==== 19 August ====
Russia claimed that the Ukrainian military destroyed the third and last bridge over the Seym River in Korenevsky District leading to possible logistical strain on over 700 square kilometers of Russian territory.

In his evening address, President Zelenskyy said that Ukrainian forces were in control of 92 settlements in Kursk Oblast and 1,250 square kilometers of Russian territory.

==== 20 August ====
The Russian interior ministry warned residents of Bryansk, Kursk and Belgorod Oblasts against using online dating websites and security cameras, citing concerns of information being gathered by Ukrainian forces. Yunus-Bek Yevkurov, former head of Ingushetia and incumbent deputy head of the Ministry of Defense was appointed as Andrei Belousov's deputy in the Coordinating Council for the Security Issues of the Bordering Territories. Belousov reported that Yevkurov was already in Kursk Oblast that day.

The Ukrainian Ministry of Defense claimed Ukrainian advances towards the villages of Novoivanovka and Kul'baki. It also stated that Korenevo was being attacked from the south. Martynovka on the Sudzha-Kursk road was also claimed to be controlled by Ukraine, who also claimed to have taken over Plekhovo in the south but stated that Borki, Kamyshnoye and Gir'i were under Russian control.

==== 21 August ====
Ukraine claimed to have destroyed several pontoon bridges used by Russian forces along the Seym River.

The Russian Air Force carried out 17 airstrikes using 27 guided aerial bombs within Ukrainian-held Russian territory, and the Russian Army conducted artillery strikes on the Ukrainian border settlements of Porozok and Pozhnia.

The Russian Ministry of Defense claimed that its forces had repelled Ukrainian assaults from Komarovka, Korenevo, Malaya Loknya and Russkaya Konopelka and attacked Ukrainian soldiers near eight villages in Kursk Oblast and nine villages in Sumy Oblast.

==== 23 August ====
Russian soldiers barricaded themselves in Women Prison No. 11 in the village of Malaya Loknya, effectively turning the building into a "fortress", using watchtowers as firing positions, making trenches amongst other defenses. Prison guards were also involved with the Russian troops in the defense of the facility, which was known to have a carrying capacity of 200 female prisoners. Ukrainian troops besieged the facility and attacked it.

==== 25 August ====
In his evening address, President Zelenskyy claimed that Ukrainian forces had advanced by one to three kilometres, resulting in the capture of two more unspecified settlements, with active operations going on in another one.

==== 29 August ====
Russian forces fully recaptured Korenevo.

==== 30 August ====
Ukrainian military commander Oleksandr Syrskyi said that his forces had advanced up to 2 km (1.2 mi) in some areas and seized control of 5 km^{2} (1.9 sq mi) of Russian territory.

100 members of the Bear Brigade, a Russian PMC, said that they would deploy from Burkina Faso to Kursk Oblast to fight Ukrainian forces.

=== September 2024 ===
On 5 September, President Zelenskyy claimed that 60,000 Russian troops had been redeployed from Zaporizhzhia and Kherson Oblasts to Kursk Oblast and that the number of Russian shells fired in the former areas had been reduced.

On 7 September, Ukrainian forces claimed to have destroyed two pontoon bridges over the Seym River and an Osa air defence system using SDB bombs and HIMARS rockets.

==== Russian counteroffensive in Korenevo district ====
The Russian army reportedly launched a counteroffensive operation in Kursk Oblast on 10 September, with reports of Russian advances in the Korenevo District. Apti Alaudinov also claimed that Russian forces entered Snagost. It was claimed that Russian forces captured the settlements of Gordeyevka and Vnezapnoye.

On 11 September, Russian counteroffensive operations in Korenevo District of Kursk Oblast reportedly continued, with some Russian sources saying that as much as 165 square kilometers had been recaptured, and Alaudinov saying that "about 10 settlements" had been recaptured. These operations came amidst a Ukrainian redeployment of troops from Kursk Oblast to the fighting near Pokrovsk, which according to a Ukrainian milblogger gave Russian forces the upper hand in Kursk. One of the objectives of the counteroffensive reportedly was to free up the isolated Russian troops between the Seym river and Ukraine.

Another Russian platoon attempting to cross a pontoon bridge on the Seym River was bombarded using HIMARS rockets.

On 12 September, the Russian defense ministry reiterated Alaudinov's statements of 10 settlements having been recaptured, and specified that these were Apanasovka, Byakhovo, Vishnevka, Viktorovka, Vnezapnoye, Gordeevka, Krasnooktyabrsky, Obukhovka, Snagost, and 10-y Oktyabr. Geolocated footage confirmed a Russian advance of 58 square kilometers, including into Snagost and Krasnooktyabrsky, but not any village captures. The Institute for the Study of War assessed that these Russian advances were in areas where Ukraine did not have full control.

The Russian capture of Snagost was visually confirmed on 13 September, while Russian sources claimed further advances through Ukraine's Kursk salient.

The Russian Ministry of Defense claimed on 16 September to have recaptured the village of Borki.

On 18 September, the Ukrainian military administration of Kursk Oblast claimed that the Russian counterattack had been halted. However, others suggested the counterattack had yet to reach full momentum. Apti Alaudinov stated that Russia had regained control over the settlements of Nikolayevo-Darino and Darino in the Sudzha District.

On 24 September, Alaudinov said that his forces had retaken 12 settlements in Kursk Oblast since the start of the Russian counterattack; 11 of these were visually confirmed to have been recaptured by Russian forces.

==== Ukrainian incursion in Glushkovo district ====
By 12 September, Ukrainian forces had conducted a new breakthrough across the Russia-Ukraine border in the Glushkovo District, at a new section of the front outside of their main salient in Kursk Oblast. Elements of the 116th Mechanized Brigade crossed the border near the villages of Novyy Put and Vesyoloye without encountering Russian resistance. Russian sources claimed that Ukrainian forces were conducting assaults near Medvezhye. Ukrainian forces also entered the southwestern part of Tyotkino.

The next day, Russian sources claimed that Ukrainian attacks continued near Vesyoloye, Novyy Put, and Medvezhye. The elements of the 116th Brigade which conducted the breakthrough later claimed that they had advanced "significantly deep" into Russian territory and had placed a group of at least a thousand Russian conscripts under threat of encirclement.

On 16 September, Russian authorities ordered the evacuation of settlements in the Rylsk and Khomutovka districts of Kursk region. Both lay within 15 kilometres of the Ukrainian border.

=== October 2024 ===
On 9 October, the Russian Ministry of Defense claimed that Russian forces had regained control over Pokrovsky and Novaya Sorochina in the Sudzha District.

On 10 October, Russian forces began a major step up in their counteroffensive in Kursk Oblast. Russian attacks on the salient in the following months were carried out every week by the same brigades and regiments, and heavy on armor. There were reports of that Russian forces had almost eliminated a salient of Ukrainian troops in Glushkovo District following a strategic encirclement.

On 11 October, Russian Forces advanced towards the villages of Veseloye and north of Lyubimovka.

On 14 October, Apti Alaudinov claimed that Russia had recaptured around half of the territory occupied by Ukraine. This was corroborated by the ISW, who said that geolocated footage could confirm that 46% had been recaptured.

By the end of the first half of October, the Ukrainian website DeepState claimed that Russian forces had broken through the left flank of the group of Ukrainian forces in Kursk, taking control of the village of Zelyonyy Shlyakh.

It was reported on 28 October 2024 that Ukrainian forces, including the 33rd Assault Battalion, the 21st Mechanized Brigade, and the 130th Mechanized Battalion of the 47th Mechanized Brigade, had conducted a new breakthrough along the Russia-Ukraine border at the village of Novyy Put in the Glushkovo District of the Kursk Oblast, and had seized Russian positions. According to David Axe, this breakthrough took place on or just before 26 October.

=== November 2024 ===
On 10 November, it was reported that in preparation for a new phase of counteroffensive around 50,000 troops, none of whom had to be diverted from eastern Ukraine, were being amassed in Kursk Oblast. This reportedly included North Korean light infantry, who were then being trained for combat away from the frontline, and whose total presence in the region totaled 10,000. According to Ukrainian officials, this force would likely attack within days. At a press briefing on 12 November, deputy spokesperson of the US State Department Vedant Patel told a press briefing that "most of" over 10,000 North Korean soldiers who had been sent to eastern Russia had been deployed at the Kursk frontline.

=== December 2024 ===
On 11 December, Russia's Ministry of Defense claimed that Russian troops had recaptured Darino and Plekhovo in the Sudzhansky District. As of 16 December 2024, it was not clear which side, if either, held Plekhovo.

On 12 December, Russia stated that it had regained control over Novoivanovka.

=== January 2025 ===
On 5 January, the Russian defense ministry stated that Ukrainian forces had launched a new offensive in Kursk Oblast around 9 AM Moscow time, with Ukrainian bloggers also suggesting an operation was underway. According to Russian military bloggers, the Ukrainian attack was launched from Sudzha in the direction of the villages of Berdin and Bolshoye Soldatskoye. Russia said that these offensive efforts had been repelled.

Ukrainian forces advanced through the fields south of Berdin into the southern part of the settlement. Russian bloggers claimed Ukrainian offensives towards Leonidovo and near Pushkarnoye. Maps from Russian bloggers indicated that Ukraine controlled the villages of Cherkasskoye Porechnoye, Martynovka, and Mikhaylovka, had entered Novosotnitsky, and advanced near Novaya Sorochina and Yamskaya Step. Some Russian milbloggers said that the offensive was possibly a feint for a future larger offensive.

Russian forces simultaneously counterattacked southeast of Sudzha, making confirmed advances in Makhnovka, and advanced through a highway west of Malaya Loknya.

On 6 January, posted geolocated footage confirmed recent Ukrainian forces advances in southern Berdin, central Russkoye Porechnoye, and central Novosotnitsky. Russian sources claimed that Leonidovo had been recaptured.

On 7 January, posted geolocated footage showed that Berdin and Novosotnitsky had been cleared from Ukrainian assaults as well as Russian advances near four other settlements in Kursk Oblast. Russian sources said that Staraya Sorochina, Russkoye Porechnoye, Kositsa, and Makhnovka had been recaptured.

Ukraine confirmed that Ukrainian offensive efforts in Kursk Oblast were ongoing.

On 8 January, geolocated footage showed that Russian forces had entered into Nikolayevka, northwest of Sudzha, from the west.

On 9 January, amidst increasing Russian efforts to recapture territory in Kursk Oblast, Russian forces recaptured the localities of Alexandriya and Leonidovo, confirmed by geolocated footage of a battalion-sized assault conducted in the area. Further confirmed advances were made near two settlements northwest of Sudzha. Russian sources claimed that Pogrebki, Maryevka and Naidenov had as well been recaptured. Ukrainian forces meanwhile were confirmed to have advanced in Nikolayevka, northwest of Sudzha.

On 27 January, the Russian Ministry of Defense claimed that Russian forces had recaptured the village of Nikolayevo-Darino.

=== February 2025 ===
On 1 February, Russian forces launched an airstrike on a boarding school in Sudzha, killing four people according to Ukrainian authorities.

A new offensive launched by Ukraine on 6 February with two mechanized battalions from the town of Makhnovka, which it controlled, led to the capture of the villages of Kolmakov and Fanaseyevka the same day. On 7 February, Putin admitted the situation was "very difficult" while meeting with regional governors. Ukraine said it was willing to offer a humanitarian corridor for civilians, but said it had not received correspondence from Russia, with Zelenskyy accusing Russia of "indifference" to the fate of its citizens.

The Russian Ministry of Defense said that Russian forces had recaptured several localities throughout February: Sverdlikovo on 17 February, Orlovka and Pogrebki on 26 February, Nikolski on 27 February, and Novaya Sorochina on 28 February.

=== March 2025 ===
==== Russian offensive, recapture of Sudzha ====
Ukrainian monitoring group DeepState reported on 6 March that Russian forces had advanced near the village of Kurilovka, south of Sudzha, threatening Ukrainian defenses. The next day, a Ukrainian military source operating in the Kursk region told Ukrainska Pravda that the Russians had indeed broken through the Ukrainian defensive line south of Sudzha on 5–6 March, and that Ukrainian units were attempting to prevent their supply routes from being cut off and their forces being encircled.

On 7 March, Reuters reported that open source maps showed that Russian forces were near to encircling thousands of Ukrainian soldiers in the Kursk region, with supply lines at risk of being cut-off by drone attacks and artillery. The Telegraph reported that 10,000 Ukrainian troops had come under risk of encirclement. Russian forces also crossed the Ukrainian border into the Sumy region. Ukrainian official Andriy Kovalenko said that Russian forces were trying to take the Yunakivka to Sudzha highway.

On 8 March, Russian forces began attacks on Sudzha itself. On the morning of 8 March, as part of an operation called "Potok" (Stream) by Russia, a group of Russian soldiers reached Ukrainian positions in Sudzha, having walked there through the Urengoy–Pomary–Uzhhorod pipeline, which had been abandoned since January. According to Russian military bloggers, Russian special forces covered nearly 16 kilometers within the pipe and spent several days inside of it before emerging in the Ukrainian rear near Sudzha. Ukrainian military blogger Yuriy Butusov said the attacking Russian force consisted of an assault company; according to Ukrainska Pravda and a Russian military blogger, about one hundred men emerged from the exit. According to Valery Gerasimov, the operation involved more than 600 soldiers. In an interview with TASS, the commander of the special forces "Akhmat", Apta Alaudinov said that Russian soldiers traveling through the pipe had marked themselves with blue tape, same color as the Ukrainian army uses, in order to deceive the Ukrainian forces and make them think "that their own units were advancing." According to the ISW, this may amount to perfidy, a war crime.

Russian sources characterized the operation as a surprise attack. A Ukrainian military source in the Kursk region denied this, telling Ukrainska Pravda that the Ukrainians had been aware of the Russian plan, but that a few days before, the Ukrainian command's focus had shifted to Kurilovka due to the breakthrough there, and that the troops in Kursk lacked the resources to blow up the pipeline. Ukrainian officer Myroslav Hai claimed later on 8 March that commanders of a Ukrainian air assault brigade had advance knowledge of the Russian plan, allowing them to carry out an ambush which he said resulted in the death of roughly 80% of the Russian forces who had emerged from the pipeline.

The Ukrainian general staff denied in a 8 March statement that the Russians had achieved a large-scale breakthrough on the border, and claimed that the Russian presence in the villages of Zhuravka and Novenke in Ukraine's Sumy region only amounted to small sabotage-reconnaissance groups and infantry units "of only a few soldiers". It also said that the Russians were conducting "heavy" assaults near Malaya Loknya and areas south of Sudzha.

By 8 March, the village of Cherkasskoye Porechnoye north of Sudzha had returned to Russian control, according to geolocated footage reviewed by the Institute for the Study of War. Russian bloggers claimed on 8 March that Lebedevka, west of Sudzha, as well as Kubatkin, north of Sudzha, had also been recaptured. The same day, the Russian ministry of defense announced that its forces had recaptured the villages of Viktorovka, Nikolaevka and Staraya Sorochina, north of Sudzha. The next day, the ministry formally claimed the capture of the Russian village of Lebedevka near the border, as well as the hamlet of Novenke in Ukraine's Sumy region. DeepState on 9 March also reported that Lebedevka had come under Russian control, and that Russian forces were pushing into Cherkasskoye Porechnoye.

According to senior Western and Ukrainian military officials, the US suspending military intelligence aid to Ukraine had a major impact on the swift Russian advances.

On 9 March, Russian bloggers claimed that Sudzha was being attacked from multiple directions and that "fierce fighting" was ongoing. By that same day, Russian forces recaptured Malaya Loknya. The Russian ministry of defense also announced the recapture of Cherkasskoye Porechnoye and Kositsa.

On 10 March, orders were given for some Ukrainian units to withdraw from Sudzha.

On 11 March, the Russian ministry of defense announced the recapture of 12 settlements: Agronom, Bogdanovka, Bondarevka, Dmitryukov, Zazulevka, Ivashkovsky, Kolmakov, Kubatkin, Martynovka, Mikhailovka, Pravda and Yuzhny. DeepState said on the same day that the Russians had made advances near Mirnoye, and were consolidating their positions and building up their forces in the eastern part of Sudzha. On the left flank of the Kursk front, the Russians were said to be pushing towards Basivka in the Sumy region; on the right flank, it was said that Ukrainian forces were slowing down the Russian advance near Guyevo, where they claimed that North Korean forces were involved in the fighting. The same day, Forbes reported that the bulk of the Ukrainian forces in Kursk, with some of Ukraine's heaviest brigades, had evacuated and repositioned on the Ukrainian side of the border.

On 12 March, Russian troops were seen raising flags in the center of Sudzha. The Russian ministry of defense announced the recapture of five settlements: Kazachya Loknya, 1st Knyazhiy, 2nd Knyazhiy, Zamostye and Mirny. Syrskyi said that Ukrainian forces were repositioning to "favorable defensive lines" and that there was no threat of encirclement. On the same day, the DeepState map was updated to show that Ukrainian forces were no longer in control of Sudzha and had left the town. Military analyst Ruslan Leviev told TV Rain that Sudzha was under full control by Russian troops, saying that Ukrainian forces were likely to completely withdraw from the Kursk region in the upcoming days.

During a 12 March visit to a command post in the Kursk region, Putin reportedly ordered the Russian military to "fully liberate" the region, saying that this had to be done "in the shortest possible time".

On 13 March, the Russian ministry of defense announced the recapture of Sudzha and the settlements of Podol and Melovoy. Russian sources claimed that Russian forces had taken control over the villages of Goncharovka, Zaoleshenka, and Rubanshchina, and were advancing towards Oleshnya.

On 14 March, the Russian ministry of defense claimed its forces had recaptured the settlement of Goncharovka. According to Forbes, contrary to Donald Trump's statement of "thousands of Ukrainian soldiers encircled" in the Kursk region, no encirclement took place in Kursk.

On 15 March, Russian sources claimed that Russian forces had taken control over Gogolevka and were clearing Guyevo. Ukrainian officials claimed that the Russians were accumulating forces along the border for a "strike" on the Sumy region, though they said there was no risk of a Russian offensive on the city of Sumy itself. The Russian ministry of defense claimed the recapture of Rubanshchina and Zaoleshenka settlements.

On 16 March, Ukraine's General Staff confirmed Ukrainian troops' withdrawal from Sudzha. According to Ukrainian soldiers interviewed by the BBC, Russia had amassed a significant force, including ″large numbers″ of North Korean soldiers to retake the town, and the retreat was disorderly and "catastrophic". The same day it was reported that Ukraine still held a "sliver of land along the border". Ukrainian officials said the withdrawal was necessary to preserve lives.

On 20 March, Ukraine's General Staff said that they continued to hold positions in the Kursk region and that the border was under their control.

On 28 March, the Russian ministry of defense announced the recapture of Gogolevka, while DeepState mapping from that day only confirmed partial control of the village.

==== Ukrainian offensive into Krasnaya Yaruga District, Belgorod region ====
After their withdrawal from most of their positions in the Kursk region, Ukrainian forces launched a surprise offensive into the Belgorod region. Zelenskyy referred to the operation as a preemptive measure to prevent the Russian military from opening new fronts. Defense analyst Yan Matveev and BBC military analyst Ilya Abishev called it a diversionary move aimed at redirecting Russian forces. According to Oliver Carroll of The Economist, the operation had been planned for three weeks and was aimed at creating a Ukrainian-controlled "buffer zone" on the Russian side of the border.

Russian military sources first claimed on 18 March that Ukrainian units were attempting to breach Russian border defenses in the Krasnaya Yaruga District. Matveev reported that the main Ukrainian attack was launched from the village of Mar'iine towards the village of Demidovka. The Russian ministry of defense said that Ukrainian forces attempted to infiltrate Demidovka and the village of Prilesye at 5:50 a.m., and made five attempts to attack the Belgorod region throughout the day, claiming that Russian forces had repelled all of them. The Ukrainian forces involved numbered up to 200 soldiers, and were supported by tanks and armored personnel carriers, according to the ministry. Russian Telegram channels said that Ukrainian forces had also attempted to cross the border at the village of Grafovka.

The next morning, Russian military channels claimed that all Ukrainian attacks had been repelled, but that the Ukrainians were being reinforced and were preparing to continue striking. Police checkpoints were set up throughout Krasnaya Yaruga District, and local authorities encouraged residents to evacuate. Ukrainian forces continued attacking on 19 March; according to the Conflict Intelligence Team, a Ukrainian unit up to battalion strength advanced 1 kilometre (0.62 mi) into the region before being pushed back. ISW assessed that Ukrainian forces had advanced northwest of Prilesye and south and southwest of Demidovka over the previous two days, and a Russian source claimed that the Ukrainians had advanced towards Grafovka. The next day, Russian sources claimed that Ukrainian forces were attacking across the border near Liptsy, and had partially surrounded Demidovka from the south. By 24 March, Ukrainian forces had entered the central part of Demidovka. ISW referred to the Ukrainian gains in the Belgorod region since 18 March as "marginal".

=== April 2025 ===
==== Kursk region ====
On 4 April, the commander of the United States European Command, General Christopher Cavoli said that Ukraine's Armed Forces still had a "sizeable chunk" of the Kursk region under their control and that Ukrainians had also expanded their presence on Russian soil to the nearby Belgorod region.

On 8 April, the Russian ministry of defense announced the recapture of Guyevo.

On 19 April, the Russian ministry of defense announced the recapture of Oleshnya.

On 21 April, Syrskyi said that Russian forces were intensifying efforts to push Ukrainian soldiers out of the Kursk region, with Ukraine holding around 30 square kilometers according to the DeepState monitoring group as of the same date.

On 22 April, The Telegraph reported that following a 10-day battle Russian forces recaptured St. Nicholas Belogorsky Monastery in Gornal, one of the last remaining Ukrainian positions in the Kursk region.

On 26 April, Russia claimed it had driven Ukrainian forces out of the region. The claim was denied by the Ukrainian government, who said that while Ukrainian forces were in a "difficult position", they had resisted encirclement and pushed back Russian assaults. Russia also acknowledged for the first time that North Korean soldiers had been fighting alongside Russian troops, with Russian General Valery Gerasimov praising the "heroism" of North Korean troops.

==== Belgorod region ====
According to ISW, Russian forces advanced within Demidovka on 22 April and likely restored control over the village of Popovka by 26 April.

=== May 2025 ===
==== Incursion at Tyotkino ====
Late on 4 May and into 5 May, an armored Ukrainian ground incursion breached the Russia-Ukraine border into the Kursk region near the settlement of Tyotkino. Battles were reported at the border, and residents were evacuated from several settlements in the Glushkovo District were evacuated. Russian sources claimed that 250 Ukrainian troops and more than 15 units of heavy equipment were involved in the push.

The Institute for the Study of War assessed that Ukrainian forces had advanced into southern Tyotkino and taken up positions there based on 6 May footage of a Russian airstrike on a building in the town. Russian sources claimed that Ukrainian forces had seized up to two streets in Tyotkino. Footage published over the following days indicated further Ukrainian advances in and around Tyotkino.

=== June 2025 ===
On 22 June 2025, Syrskyi said that despite repeated insistence from Russia that the entire region had been recaptured, Ukrainian forces were still defending a small area of around 90 square kilometers in Kursk, with about 10,000 Russian troops attempting to drive them back.

=== October/November 2025 ===
In late October 2025, the Ukrainian spokesperson of the Kursk troop grouping, Oleksandr Nevidomyi, claimed that Ukraine still maintained control over some positions inside Russian territory. The ISW reported that Russian forces had attacked in unspecified areas of the oblast on 2 and 3 November.

== Reactions ==
=== Russia ===
The Russian Ministry of Defence initially claimed on 6 August that the attack had been repelled. The ministry stated, "After suffering losses, the Ukrainian sabotage group retreated to its territory, while some of the fighters attempted to establish a position on the territory adjacent to the state border, where they were blocked by Russian army units." President Vladimir Putin described the AFU's offensive into Kursk Oblast as a "large-scale provocation." He accused the "Kyiv regime" of "indiscriminately firing various types of weapons, including missiles, at civilian buildings, houses, and ambulances." Putin stated that he plans to meet with the heads of the security agencies, the Defense Ministry, and the Federal Security Service (FSB).

State Duma deputy and retired major general Andrey Gurulyov criticized the Russian army for failing to defend Kursk Oblast. On 8 August, Gurulyov said in a television interview that the Russian military knew about the planned Ukrainian invasion of Kursk a month before it happened but "from the top came the order not to panic, and that those above know better."

On 13 August, an immediate special meeting in the "Arria format" of the United Nations Security Council took place on request of Russia's Commissioner for Human Rights Tatyana Moskalkova, who demanded to "condemn the actions of Ukraine" in relation to the events in Kursk Oblast.

In response to the offensive, Putin has reportedly set deadlines for Russian forces to push Ukrainian troops out of Kursk Oblast, first by October 2024, which was then delayed to January 2025.

Pro-Kremlin political analyst Sergei Markov told The Washington Post that "the signal came from intelligence to the leadership, but ... measures were not taken. This is a failure of the entire system of intelligence, and since Putin is responsible for this, then it's clear this is a blow to Putin." Markov said that "Putin has said many times that any peace agreement should take into account the facts on the ground and that Russia will not leave the territory it has taken" and Ukraine is trying "to break this formula and gain Russian territory to exchange."

Russian Foreign Ministry spokeswoman Maria Zakharova protested about "the criminal Kiev regime" and said that "all this only reinforces the sense of impunity of Ukrainian neo-Nazis." Later on 11 August, she stated "The Kyiv regime is continuing its terrorist activity with the sole purpose of intimidating the peaceful population of Russia" and that the incursion "makes no sense from a military point of view."

Former President and deputy chairman of the Security Council of Russia, Dmitry Medvedev, issued a statement that the incursion made it so "This [war] is no longer just an operation to retake our official territories and punish the Nazis. It is possible and necessary to go to the lands of the still existing Ukraine. To Odesa, to Kharkiv, to Dnipropetrovsk, to Mykolaiv. To Kyiv and beyond," and that "The current military campaign will also end in Russia's unconditional victory."

After a HIMARS strike reportedly destroyed a Russian battalion on the night of 8–9 August, numerous Russian milbloggers responded with outrage. Many of them called for the commanders who authorized the movement of the column to be punished, such as Russian military analyst Roman Alekhine wrote that "we need executions". Meanwhile, "The Two Majors" blog wrote that "whoever gave the order to move in columns in the area... should be sentenced under the laws of war". The channel "Thirteenth", which has ties to the Wagner Group, called those responsible "brainless creatures". "In the third year of the war, even a monkey could be trained, but not some [Russian] Ministry of Defense staff general who gave the orders for such a suicidal march in the frontline zone".

FSB chief Alexander Bortnikov called the Ukrainian offensive "a terrorist attack" and accused Ukraine of attacking civilians and civilian infrastructure "with the support of the collective West."

On 16 August, Putin's aide Nikolai Patrushev claimed, without providing evidence, that the invasion of Kursk Oblast was "planned with the participation of NATO and Western special services", calling the offensive "a desperate act, driven by the impending collapse of the neo-Nazi regime in Kyiv."

On 28 August, restrictions were imposed on travel to Kurchatov, where the Kursk Nuclear Power Plant is located. Only residents of the town were allowed to freely enter, while non-resident employees were required to obtain an entry permit issued by local authorities or from the power plant in the case of its workers.

==== Charges against foreign journalists ====
On 16 August, Russia summoned Italian ambassador Cecilia Piccioni to the Ministry of Foreign Affairs in Moscow due to journalists from the Italian public broadcaster RAI reporting in the Ukrainian occupied parts of Kursk Oblast the previous day. The ministry accused the journalists of entering Russia illegally to report about a "criminal terrorist attack committed by Ukrainian soldiers". On 17 August, the FSB filed a criminal case against journalists Simone Traini and Stefania Battistini for unauthorized entry into Kursk Oblast. On 20 August, the U.S. Embassy's Chief of Mission Stephanie Holmes was summoned by the foreign ministry over reportage by CNN journalists in occupied Kursk Oblast. On 22 August, the FSB also filed charges against CNN reporter Nick Paton Walsh and Ukrainian journalists Olesia Borovyk and Diana Butsko for illegal entry into Russia. On 27 August, the FSB filed similar charges against Deutsche Welle correspondent Nick Connolly and Nataliya Nahorna, a reporter for Ukrainian television channel 1+1.

On 27 September, the FSB charged Australian Broadcasting Corporation reporters Kathryn Diss and Fletcher Yeung with illegal entry into Russia, along with Romanian HotNews journalist Mircea Barba. On 7 October, the FSB launched investigations against France 24 correspondent Catherine Norris Trent and Swiss journalist Kurt Pelda from CH Media. In response, France 24 said that its reportage inside occupied Kursk Oblast was protected activity in accordance with the rights afforded to journalists under the Geneva Convention and international law.

=== Ukraine ===
The decision to invade Kursk was criticized by some of Ukraine's top military leaders including Valery Zaluzhny and Emil Ishkulov.

On the first day of the incursion, the head of Ukraine's Center for Countering Disinformation, Andriy Kovalenko, refuted Russian claims that the situation at the border was under control, replying "Russia does not control the border". President Volodymyr Zelenskyy's adviser, Mykhailo Podolyak, acknowledged the incursion on 8 August, but not Ukraine's role. Podolyak said it was an opportunity to see how ordinary Russians feel about their government, but said it is unlikely they would "come out with flowers to greet the anti-Putin tanks". Podolyak said Ukraine had no interest in occupying Kursk, but that it had to force Russia into fair negotiations to end the war in Ukraine.

President Zelenskyy first acknowledged that Ukraine's forces were involved during his evening address on 10 August. He said "Ukraine is proving that it can indeed restore justice and is ensuring the exact kind of pressure that is needed – pressure on the aggressor". On 12 August, Zelenskyy said that "Russia must be forced to make peace", adding "Russia brought war to others, now it's coming home". He maintained that the operation was a matter of security for Ukraine and that its troops captured areas from which Russia had launched numerous strikes. According to Zelenskyy and other officials, the capture of hundreds of Russian soldiers was replenishing Ukraine's "exchange fund" for prisoner swaps. On 19 August, Zelenskyy said that he did not disclose preparations for the incursion to Kyiv's allies, because they might deem it to cross Russia's "strictest of all red lines". Zelenskyy later said that one of the goals of Ukraine's incursion was to show Russians "what is more important to him [Putin]: the occupation of the territories of Ukraine or the protection of his population."

Ukrainian foreign ministry spokesman Georgiy Tykhy said that "unlike Russia", Ukraine is not interested in taking the territory of its neighbor. He said "the purpose of the operation is to save the lives of our people and protect the territory of Ukraine from Russian strikes", as well as to hinder Russia's movement of troops to the Donbas. Tykhy added: "The sooner Russia agrees to restore a just peace ... the sooner the raids by the Ukrainian defense forces into Russia will stop".

On 14 August, Zelenskyy said that the creation of civil administrative bodies in Kursk Oblast should not be ruled out. Deputy prime minister Iryna Vereshchuk said that the Ukrainian military was creating a "security zone" on Russian territory to protect Ukrainian border areas. She said that Ukraine would be conducting humanitarian operations in the area, that international humanitarian organizations would be allowed to enter, and that safe corridors would be opened for civilians to evacuate toward Ukraine or to other parts of Russia.

On 7 September, Kyrylo Budanov noted that the offensive into Kursk had impacted and "complicated" Russian plans for an offensive in the upcoming winter.

On 13 September, Zelenskyy acknowledged the Russian counter-attack but claimed there had been "no serious (Russian) success", adding that "It gave the results that, frankly speaking, we counted on" and reiterated claims that it had adversely affected Russian operations in Kharkiv and Donetsk Oblasts.

On 16 September, the Ukrainian government invited the United Nations and the International Committee of the Red Cross to inspect areas of Kursk Oblast that were under its control.

=== United States ===
The White House said that it was seeking an understanding from Ukraine regarding the incursion, adding that it had no advance knowledge of the attack. On 8 August, Deputy Pentagon Press Secretary Sabrina Singh stated that the incursion is consistent with the US policy on the use of weapons. On 12 August, US National Security Council spokesperson John Kirby called on Putin to withdraw his forces from Ukraine if he "doesn't like" the Ukrainian incursion in Kursk Oblast. On 13 August, President Joe Biden said that the Ukrainian incursion was "creating a real dilemma" for Putin.

=== Germany ===
In response to the Kursk offensive, the German Foreign Ministry stated on 9 August that weapons transferred from Germany to Ukraine become the property of Ukraine and can be used by its armed forces as they deem necessary and correct. The German Foreign Ministry further stated that Ukraine's right to self-defense is enshrined in international law and not limited to its own territory.

Chair of the Bundestag's Defence Committee Marcus Faber told German media in the first few days of the incursion that Ukraine was free to use "all materials" provided, including Leopard 2 deliveries. He tweeted on 11 August claiming that the incursion forced Russia to move forces from the front in the east, reducing the pressure there and that this provided an occasion to discuss further Leopard 2 deliveries.

=== China ===
China's Ministry of Foreign Affairs said all parties should "observe the three principles for deescalating the situation, namely no expansion of the battlefield, no escalation of fighting and no fueling the flame by any party", added that Beijing will continue to maintain contact with the international community and play a constructive role in promoting a political settlement of the "Ukrainian crisis".

=== Belarus ===
On 15 August, Belarusian President Alexander Lukashenko urged both Russia and Ukraine to start negotiations to end the war. He accused the West of supporting the incursion into Kursk Oblast in order to encourage new mobilization and destabilize the situation in Russia and Belarus.

On 18 August, Lukashenko said that Ukraine had massed 120,000 troops near the border with Belarus, and that he had ordered a third of the Belarusian army to be deployed near the border with Ukraine.

=== Syria ===
On 10 August, a statement by Syria's Foreign Ministry said the country was following the incursion "with great concern", which it described as a "terrorist attack".

=== Organisations ===
Following reports on 10 August of fighting near the Kursk Nuclear Power Plant, the head of the International Atomic Energy Agency, Rafael Grossi, called on Russia and Ukraine to exercise "maximum restraint" to avoid a nuclear accident. On 27 August, Grossi visited the facility, during which he said that "the danger or possibility of a nuclear accident has emerged" nearby.

The Anti-War Committee of Russia, a group formed by Russians in exile, issued a statement criticizing Putin. It said "the absence of any significant military units of the Russian Federation on the border at the time of the attack and the simultaneous continuous conduct of aggressive military operations for more than 900 days on the territory of sovereign Ukraine is the best proof that Putin is lying again about 'protecting Russia.' He doesn't care about Russia, he is only protecting himself."

NATO Secretary-General Jens Stoltenberg called the Ukrainian incursion "legitimate" and within Kyiv's right to self-defense, adding that the bloc did not receive prior information about the operation and did not play a role in it.

=== Evaluation of the offensive ===
The BBC reported that the August 2024 offensive was the first incidence since World War II that Russian territory had been occupied by foreign forces (although other sources state that foreign jihadists occupied some Russian territory during the War in Dagestan in 1999). The incursion has been dubbed the "second battle of Kursk", in allusion to the 1943 battle in the same region. The offensive is also larger than earlier ground raids, with at least two brigades from the regular Ukrainian forces participating. These forces are mechanized, highly mobile and protected by significant air defense. The offensive appears to have taken Russia by surprise. The Institute for the Study of War reports that, according to Russian sources the Ukrainians use "novel and innovative tactics" and that small armored units bypass Russian defenses, strike in the rear and then withdraw.

The Ukrainian surprise offensive in the Russian border region of Kursk suggested an attempt to shift the momentum against Russia. A significant challenge for Ukraine had been responding to Russia's strategy of expanding the front line, particularly with intensified fighting around Kharkiv. According to Rob Lee, a senior fellow in the Foreign Policy Research Institute's Eurasia program, this offensive has further stretched Ukraine's forces, reducing their reserves to counter Russian advances towards Pokrovsk, Chasiv Yar, and Toretsk. On 10 August, Ukraine said it had recorded the lowest number of "combat engagements" on its territory since 10 June, which some observers considered as a sign that the offensive had brought relief to Ukrainian forces. However, the Russian advance in Donbas had been accelerated by late August, reportedly making the Ukrainian offensive a more long-term project.

By November 2024, three months into the operation, the overall situation for the Ukrainian military had not significantly improved. According to Ukrainian military command, only about 50% of the operation's objectives have been achieved. Many Ukrainian officers and soldiers reportedly had mixed feelings about the Kursk offensive, though it had provided a morale boost. A frequent criticism from Ukrainian troops is that the offensive has weakened positions in the Donbas and further south due to the redeployment of personnel from those fronts. According to Le Monde, the Kursk offensive has faced serious setbacks, which have largely gone undiscussed.

Retired Major General Mick Ryan saw several possible objectives for the incursion. On the tactical level, seizing ground and destroying Russian forces. On an operational level, to draw Russian forces away from Donetsk and in general to force Russia to reconsider their disposition of forces. Other objectives may be more related to the terrain itself, like the Kursk nuclear plant and key roads and railroads. Finally, on the strategic level, to slow Russia's offensive momentum, to shift the narrative and counter Russian talking points about their inevitable victory, and also to boost Ukrainian morale.

Matthew Savill, director of military sciences at the Royal United Services Institute (RUSI), said that the Ukrainian incursion into Russia was "the first on this scale with conventional forces, rather than proxies [or] 'resistance' groups." He also assessed that earlier raids into Kursk and Belgorod were designed to probe for Russian weak spots, and that the overall goal of the raid is to dismantle Russia's ability to funnel more troops into the Kharkiv front and that "It's unlikely that the plan is to seriously take Kursk itself, or to try and hold vast swathes of Russian territory." BBC journalists noted the overall decrease of Russian attacks on the Ukrainian frontline at around 15–17% after the beginning of Kursk raids, which could be the sign of Russia taking forces from the frontline into Kursk Oblast.

Nico Lange, former chief of staff at the German Federal Ministry of Defence, stated that the incursion was likely "to establish a negotiating position and provide relief on other front lines" and that it is unlikely that Ukrainian forces would hold territory in Kursk for long periods of time. Retired Polish General and former commander of special forces, Roman Polko, stated that "It's good that Ukraine is taking actions that surprise the Russians," and that "Ukraine is in a defensive position and is unable to conduct an operation to push Russia from the occupied regions, but Ukraine is defending itself in an active way," and that "One can't allow the Russians to comfortably prepare new attacks."

Political analyst Andreas Umland suggested that the offensive could bring a quicker end to the war. He notes that Ukraine's allies had severely restricted the kinds of weapons sent to Ukraine and their permitted range, fearful of crossing the Kremlin's "red lines" and sparking World War III. One of those red lines was "taking the war to Russia with Western weapons". Umland concludes: "Part of the effect and purpose of the Kursk operation could be to demonstrate, once again, the fallacy of the red-line argument". He added that if Ukrainian forces could hold Russian territory "it could strengthen Ukraine's leverage in any potential negotiations". Likewise, Peter Dickinson of the Atlantic Council said the offensive "succeeded in making a complete mockery of Vladimir Putin's red lines". Dickinson wrote that the West "spent more than two years slow-walking military aid to Ukraine for fear of provoking Putin", but he maintained that "Putin's characteristically weak response to the Kursk offensive" showed there were "no more excuses for restricting Kyiv's ability to defend itself" and that "the quickest way to end the war is by arming Ukraine for victory". The International Institute for Strategic Studies said that the operation bears high risks and high stakes for both sides.

Nevertheless, two weeks onward, despite the initial surprise, analysts began to question the motives and goals of the incursion. By the third week of the incursion, it was apparent that the incursion was slowing down whilst the main front in the Donbas was becoming critical. According to the deputy commander of the Third Assault Brigade of the Ukrainian Armed Forces, Maksym Zhorin, one of the main goals of the incursion was to draw Russian forces away from Donbas into Kursk, in order to relieve pressure on the Eastern Front. However, this apparent bait failed. According to Michael Kofman, the transfer of manpower and resources from Donbas to Kursk resulted in the strategic and critical city of Pokrovsk coming in range of Russian artillery, as well as Russian advances in the important Ukrainian towns of Niu-York and Toretsk. Saying that Ukraine was struggling to maintain its hold on Kursk, Kofman concluded that the incursion could be considered a strategic disaster if it led to the loss of Pokrovsk, which would have profound effects on the Ukrainian defense across the Donetsk Oblast as a whole. Rob Lee from the Foreign Policy Research Institute explained a similar critique that the shifting of experienced personnel and resources from the east to Kursk has resulted in a degradation of defences due to the presence of less experienced troops.

While Russian forces did not slow down in the Pokrovsk sector, they did, however, draw several brigades away from the Kherson, Bakhmut, Vovchansk and Kreminna sectors. According to the Commander of the Lithuanian Land Forces Raimundas Vaikšnoras, Russia was also forced to withdraw some ground forces it had previously deployed in the Kaliningrad Oblast exclave. On 24 August, Zelenskyy said that the incursion halted Russia's plans to launch an offensive from the north, the goal of which was to capture Sumy. On 13 September, the commander of the Estonian Defence Forces Intelligence Centre, Colonel Ants Kiviselg, said that while Russia had redeployed some forces "Russia's offensive activity in the Donetsk direction had not decreased much." He cited a decline from 185 attacks per day down to 110 attacks per day. Russia had responded by moving forces from Zaporizhzhia and Kherson oblasts instead of Donetsk or Kharkiv. Kiviselg said that the Russian counterattack in Kursk had "not made significant progress" and had suffered losses, but speculated that the Russian movement may have simply been a probing attack and not the main offensive effort.

By 2 October 2024, nearly two months since the incursion, it was widely agreed that the operation in Kursk had a direct relation with the degradation of Ukraine's eastern front. Ukraine suffered its steepest loss in territory between mid-August to mid-September, which also coincided with Ukraine's incursion into Kursk according to Pasi Paroinen, analyst of the Black Bird Group. Rob Lee further supported his earlier argument, stressing that Kursk had stretched Ukrainian personnel thin, added pressure on units holding the line and exacerbated the manpower issues in Ukraine, which is further made worse with heavy losses of experienced Ukrainian soldiers, coupled with new troops sped to the front with limited training.

By 20 November 2024, three months into the incursion, Marina Miron, a defence researcher at King's College London, declared the entire operation to be a costly, strategic failure for Ukraine. She stated that whilst it offered short-term tactical brilliance, it came at the cost of long-term strategic catastrophe, as not only did it fail to gain any political leverage or draw the Russian armed forces away from the Donbas, but it led to multiple Ukrainian units being tied down in Kursk at a time where the UAF is suffering acute manpower shortage; contributing to Russia gaining more than 1,000 km^{2} (390 sq mi) between 1 and 3 November in Eastern Ukraine and allowing Russia to breach Kupiansk. In Kursk itself, the Russians regained 593 km^{2} (229 sq mi), and it was clear that Ukraine was losing its grip on this region. Miron warned that the entire eastern Ukrainian front would collapse if the advancement continued. The same month, David Axe opined that the Ukrainian invasion and capture of territory in August was an impressive tactical achievement for overstretched forces, but that its wider strategical implications were unclear. He wrote that if the Ukrainian intention had been to force Russia to divert significant units from eastern Ukraine, it had failed, because Russian offensives in the Donetsk Oblast had not slowed down even amid Russian counterattacks in Kursk.

In response to improved Ukrainian electronic warfare capabilities displayed in Kursk, Russia deployed fiber optic drones impervious to electronic warfare radio emissions, which proved to be highly effective.

== Analysis ==
Western researchers assess the outcome of the operation differently. In March 2025, when Russian forces retook Sudzha, military analyst Michael Kofman assessed the Ukrainian incursion as a tactical success, which, however, had not changed the overall dynamic in the war. Kofman assessed that by early February 2025, the salient created by the offensive had become impossible to hold as Russia had increasingly been able to hinder the use of supply routes. According to another military analyst, Steen Kjærgaard, the US cutting intelligence sharing with Ukraine on 5 March played a major role in Russians retaking Sudzha, with Ukraine lacking information on Russian troop movements. Richard Kemp from The Telegraph viewed the entire Kursk operation to be a defeat for Ukraine, as Ukraine had lost any "bargaining chip" to trade land for land in any ceasefire negotiations. Former military advisor Nico Lange viewed the operation as a success. Nick Reynolds, a land warfare expert with the Royal United Services Institute said that he hesitated to say that the effort by Ukraine was a strategic mistake, that Ukraine had held the Sudzha pocket for a "remarkable" amount of time, and that the Ukrainian offensive had had a "shaping effect on Russian thinking". On 26 April 2025, the ISW said that the Ukrainian operation succeeded in diverting some Russian "elite" units from Donbas, but its long-term effects remain to be seen.

=== Impact ===
The attack reportedly pushed up natural gas prices 5% to €40 per megawatt-hour in Europe, while YouTube and phone networks experienced outages in Russia. The transit of Russian gas through the Ukrainian gas transportation system decreased to 37.25 million cubic metres per day from the usual 42–42.4 million cubic metres. Sudzha is home to the Soviet-era Urengoy–Pomary–Uzhhorod pipeline, which continues to transport Russian natural gas from Western Siberia through Ukraine to Europe. Agricultural damage due to the conflict in Kursk Oblast was estimated to be at 85 billion rubles ($932.6 million).

Nearly 200,000 civilians in Russia were displaced by the fighting. Some of the displaced were to be moved to Russian-occupied parts of Zaporizhzhia Oblast in southern Ukraine. Some Russian civilians in the territory under Ukrainian occupation complained in August that they had been abandoned by the Russian government. On 8 August, Putin pledged that the government would provide financial assistance of 10,000 rubles ($100) to those displaced by the fighting. By early September, around 87,600 residents had received financial aid totaling 1.3 billion rubles ($14.3 million). In November, protests were held in Kursk city by evacuees from Bolshesoldatsky and Sudzhansky districts complaining about the failure to provide compensation and housing and demanding that the situation be recognized as a war. This led to the dismissal of the head of Sudzhansky district, Alexander Bogachev. A collective appeal to Putin was also made by displaced residents of Olgovka, calling on him to "end this cursed war". On 5 December, Alexei Smirnov resigned as governor of Kursk Oblast and was replaced by federal deputy Alexander Khinshtein. Smirnov was arrested in April over embezzlement of the fortification investments. His predecessor Roman Starovoyt committed suicide in July while being investigated about the same case. People displaced within the region had to confront steeped housing costs. Some of the villages lack water and electricity and others are not planned for rebuilding after Russian scorched earth tactics.

Although President Putin repeatedly promised that young conscripts would not be deployed in the war with Ukraine, conscripts from several Russian regions were sent to fight with Ukrainian troops in Kursk Oblast. Many conscripts fell into Ukrainian captivity. An online petition by mothers of conscripts pleading with Putin to withdraw conscripts from combat received nearly 10,000 signatures.

According to the Russian independent server Astra, hundreds of Russian men who refused to fight in Ukraine for health or conscience reasons were transported from a military facility near St. Petersburg to the area around Kursk. Relatives of the soldiers expressed fears that the "refuseniks" would be used in human wave attacks.

On 17 August, The Washington Post reported, citing anonymous diplomatic sources, that Ukraine's incursion into Russia disrupted plans for indirect talks in Qatar to halt mutual strikes on energy infrastructure in Ukraine and Russia. Both Ukraine and Russia had planned to send their delegations to indirect talks mediated by Qatari officials, but Russian officials postponed the meeting in the wake of Ukraine's incursion. Some officials hoped it could be the first step toward a more comprehensive peace deal. Russian foreign ministry spokesperson Maria Zakharova said that there were "no direct or indirect negotiations between Russia and Ukraine on the safety of civilian critical infrastructure facilities" and that after the assault on Kursk Oblast, Putin ruled out the possibility of such talks. A Russian academic with close ties to senior Russian diplomats said that Putin probably lost interest in further talks in Qatar because the "Russian leadership usually does not make any compromises under pressure" and attacks on energy infrastructure are highly effective tactics that do more damage to Ukraine than to Russia, adding that Russia is more interested in talks with Ukraine about a broader ceasefire.

The level of anxiety among Russians was much less than that after the 2022 mobilization, according to a Levada poll.

The incursion led the Russian Central Election Commission to postpone voting for the 2024 Russian elections in seven municipalities located in occupied areas of Kursk Oblast that were originally scheduled for 6–8 September. In Belgorod Oblast, authorities ordered the start of classes in September to be held online in areas within 20 kilometers of the Ukrainian border.

According to BBC journalists, Russian soldiers in territories of Kursk Oblast near the front engaged in looting.

== Casualties ==
=== Russia ===
Ukraine claimed their forces had shot down an Mi-28 and two Ka-52 helicopters.

On 9 August 2024, HIMARS destroyed a convoy of Russian troops in Kursk Oblast in what Russian milbloggers described as one of the bloodiest attacks of the entire war.

On 12 August, Ukrainian military expert Mykhailo Zhirokhov claimed that the ratio of Ukrainian to Russian manpower losses as "closer to 1 to 10", and the number of Russian POWs taken as "thousands". Since most of the best Russian troops were deployed in Ukraine, most of the Russian soldiers protecting the Russian border in the Kursk region were young, inexperienced conscripts who suffered heavy losses in combat with experienced Ukrainian troops.

On 19 August, the Ukrainian resistance group Atesh claimed that a battalion from the 810th Guards Naval Infantry Brigade had suffered heavy losses and had only 30% of its combat personnel left. According to a Western official, about 1,000 Russian soldiers were killed or wounded daily in the fighting in Kursk and Donbas.

As of 23 September 2024, Russian officials reported that at least 56 civilians had been killed since the start of the incursion, while at least 266 others, including 11 children, had been injured. The Russian state broadcaster Russia-24 announced that one of its reporters, Evgeniy Poddubny, had been injured in a drone attack on his vehicle while reporting on the fighting in the affected areas on 7 August. On 16 August, the All-Russia People's Front said that one of its medical staff and a media coordinator had been killed after their vehicle was shelled while assisting in evacuation efforts. At least 770 residents of Kursk Oblast went missing following the incursion. Around 20,000 civilians are believed to be living under Ukrainian occupation in the oblast. In October 2024, Russian human rights commissioner Tatyana Moskalkova accused Ukraine of forcibly taking more than 1,000 residents of Kursk Oblast.

On 10 November, the Ukrainian 95th Airborne Assault Brigade claimed to have repelled an assault by the Russian 810th Marine Brigade, killing 100 and wounding 100 personnel in two days, while also destroying 28 pieces of equipment.

On 20 November, the Ukrainian 80th Air Assault Brigade claimed to have captured 26 Russian soldiers in a single battle on Kursk Oblast.

On 27 December, the South Korean National Intelligence Service said that a North Korean soldier had been taken prisoner by Ukrainian forces for the first time in Kursk Oblast. However, the soldier was reported to have died later in the day from injuries sustained in combat.

On 29 December, Forbes reported that the Russian 810th Marine Brigade had been redeployed for rest and refit after suffering heavy losses in Kursk Oblast. In November, two 400-person battalions from the brigade had reportedly been "eliminated" in an attack against the Ukrainian garrison in Pogrebki.

On 3 January, Bratislav Živković, the commander of a Serbian Chetnik volunteer unit within the Russian armed forces was reported as having been killed by Ukrainian forces.

On 5 January, the Ukrainians claimed to have fired Storm Shadow missiles at a 76th Airborne Division command post, killing eight and wounding personnel, while a Russian insider source claimed that another Ukrainian strike killed the division's Communications Head on 30 December.

North Korean forces have reportedly suffered heavy losses in Kursk Oblast, including 1,000 casualties over one week in late December 2024. President Zelenskyy also said that North Korean infantry and Russian paratroopers had lost a battalion near Makhnovka on 3 to 4 January 2025, with analyst Andrew Perpetua visually confirming 408 casualties in one day. "I feel like I just watched a whole Russian battalion die in a single video", he noted.

On 16 January, it was reported that Ukrainian paratroopers captured 27 Russian soldiers during "recent combat operations" in Kursk Oblast.

On 22 January, the 8th Regiment of the Ukrainian Special Operations Forces said it had killed 21 North Korean soldiers and injured 40 others following an assault by the latter.

On or just before 23 January, a feigned defeat and retreat of the Ukrainian army's 225th Assault Battalion deceived Russian soldiers to advance to outside the long-contested village of Sverdlikovo, where they were attacked with cluster munition from HIMARS by Ukraine and were reported by Ukraine to have sustained a large number of casualties. Ukraine retook the area upon the attack.

On 2 February 2025, President Zelenskyy claimed that one of three North Korean Brigades sent to Kursk Oblast, over 4,000 soldiers, had been "wiped out", with the other two having suffered losses. In the same interview, he claimed that a strike on 31 January on a Russian command post had inflicted "dozens" of officer casualties.

On 26 April 2025, the Ukrainian General Staff claimed that the Russian army had lost 62,400 soldiers in Kursk Oblast since the start of their army's operations there. Of these, 25,200 were "irreversible" losses and 36,200 were injured. Another 983 Russian soldiers were taken prisoner.

After Russia claimed it had fully recaptured Kursk Oblast in April 2025, the region's governor, Alexander Khinstein, said that 791 civilians had been harmed during the incursion, with 288 of them being killed. Khinstein said that the bodies of killed civilians in the region were being recovered, but gave no details on how they had died.

=== Ukraine ===
Russia claimed that six Ukrainian tanks and ten armored vehicles were lost in the initial engagement on 6 August. Acting governor of Kursk Oblast, Alexei Smirnov, claimed that 26 Ukrainian UAVs were shot down in the area. Russia later claimed on 9 August, that Ukraine had losses of 945 soldiers and 102 armored vehicles, although this could not be verified.

On 17 August 2024, Forbes reported "heavy Ukrainian equipment write-offs compared to relatively few Russian write-offs."

On 22 December 2024, Dzhaba Kvaratskhelia, the commander of the Georgian volunteer unit "Free Georgia", was killed in action alongside three other members of the unit.

DeepStateMap.Live reported that nine Ukrainian "drone operators and contractors" were shot after surrendering to Russian forces on 10 October.

During an interview in 2026, “Malyuk” and “Rameses” of the 10th Mountain Assault Brigade's Shkval battalion said that during the Kursk campaign, of the original 120 men of their unit, only 20 had not been killed or seriously wounded.

As of 25 October 2026, UALosses confirmed by name Ukrainian casualties during the Kursk campaign as 6,601 killed, 11,377 missing and 687 captured.

== See also ==
- 2023 Bryansk Oblast raid
- 2023 Belgorod Oblast incursions
- March 2024 western Russia incursion
- North Korean involvement in the Russian invasion of Ukraine
- Ukrainian occupation of Kursk Oblast – Military occupation
- 2025 Sumy Offensive
