= 501st Separate Naval Infantry Battalion =

Military unit

501st Separate Marine Battalion
- 501-й окремий батальйон морської піхоти
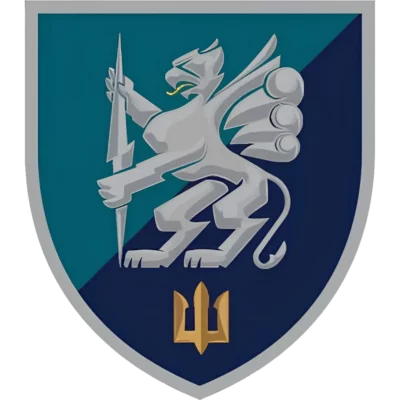
- Founded: 26 December 2013
- Country: Ukraine
- Allegiance: Armed Forces of Ukraine
- Branch: Ukrainian Marine Corps
- Type: Marines
- Size: Battalion
- Part of: 30th Marine Corps: 36th Marine Brigade
- Garrison/HQ: Kerch (2003–2014); Berdiansk (2014–2022), Mykolaiv, Mykolaiv Oblast (2022-)
- Mottos: God and victory are with us
- Engagements: Russo-Ukrainian war: Annexation of Crimea by the Russian Federation; War in Donbas; Full scale invasion; Siege of Mariupol; 2024 Kursk offensive
- Decorations: For Courage and Bravery

Commanders
- Current commander: Major Yaroslav Kryklyvy
- Notable commanders: Kostiantyn Bezsmertnyi; Mykola Biriukov

Insignia
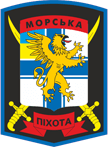
- Shoulder patch (2014–2023)

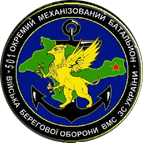
- Shoulder patch (2013–2014)

- Flag

The 501st Separate Marine Battalion (MUN A1965) is a military unit of the Ukrainian Marine Corps, part of the 36th Marine Brigade of the Ukrainian Armed Forces based in Berdyansk, Zaporizhzhia Oblast. It was formerly an independent Marine battalion that was part of the Ukrainian defense of Crimea and later part of the Ukrainian forces in the Siege of Mariupol, where the unit's commanders switched sides and tricked most of the battalion into surrendering to Russian forces.

== Russian annexation of Crimea ==
From Ukraine's independence in 1992 to 2003, the defense of the Crimean Peninsula was tasked to the 32nd Army Corps, numbering 12,000 troops. However, in 2003, Ukraine re-prioritized the defense of Crimea due to good relations with Russia, disbanding the 32nd Army Corps and tasking the Ukrainian Navy with the defense of Crimea. The Navy fielded 5,600 men in three units on the Peninsula. The largest, the 36th Separate Coastal Defense Brigade, was based in Perevalne; the 1st Marine Corps was in Feodosia; and the 501st Separate Naval Infantry Battalion was the closest to the Russian border in Kerch.

The 501st Separate Naval Infantry Battalion was officially established in December 2013, being the reformation of the Separate Mechanized Battalion of the Coastal Defense Forces.

In February 2014, the Russian Federal Security Service organized anti-Ukrainian meetings and convinced several local anti-Maidan supporters to seize a series of ferry docks, which in turn allowed 30,000 unmarked Russian personnel to cross the Kerch Strait at night. When the 501st woke up in the morning, they found their barracks surrounded, as well as the barracks of the nearby 127th battalion of the Ukrainian Coast Guard. The mayor Oleh Osadchy had been arrested and deposed, and a new Russian mayor had been installed in his place. The personnel of the unit were given three options: remain loyal to their oaths to Ukraine and surrender their weapons to be escorted to unoccupied Ukraine, disband and return home, or break their oaths and swear new ones to Russia. Of the 300 personnel of the battalion, only 64 returned to Ukraine.

The battalion was reconstituted in 2023 and fought on the Donetsk front. The defecting personnel of the 501st, along with the 1st Marine Corps, formed the Russian 501st Naval Infantry Battalion. Personnel loyal to Ukraine from the 501st, 1st, and 36th were merged to form the 36th Marine Brigade, with the 501st preserving their identity, command and logo as a highly autonomous battalion based out of Berdiansk.

== Russian invasion of Ukraine ==
=== Siege of Mariupol ===
During the outbreak of the Russian Invasion of Ukraine, the 501st, as part of the 36th, was tasked with the defense of Mariupol. As the battle developed into a siege, the unit was tasked with the defense of the Illich industrial works. The unit operated independently and had a runner sent from the 36th for status reports. However, when the runner arrived at the Illich works, the 501st was nowhere to be found. Their weapons, food, personal effects, and other items were left, and it was as if the entire battalion had disappeared. It was not until April 4 that Russia reported that the 501st had surrendered. The loss of the 501st meant that the defenders of Mariupol could no longer defend the entire perimeter of the city, and instead had to rely on a series of strongholds throughout the city.

The State Bureau of Investigation (DBR) opened an investigation into the battalion's commanders, uncovering that Kostiantyn Bezsmertnyi had spread pro-Russian propaganda to his men, received payments from Russian intelligence, and defected with the condition that the battalion and officers would be transferred to the Donetsk People's Republic. Bezsmertnyi continues to operate as a collaborator, visiting Ukrainian POW camps near his hometown of Berdiansk to try and coerce POWs to sign with the Russian army.

Initially, Ukraine treated all 277 members of the unit as defectors and cut off payments to their families. However, this policy was reversed after the release of Ukrainian POWs who interviewed members of the 501st and shared that the personnel were duped by their commanding officers, namely Bezsmertnyi and Mykola Biriukov, as well as several junior officers, were told that they were evacuating via a humanitarian corridor, and did not realize they were being sent to POW camps until after they were on busses.

=== After Mariupol ===
Despite 277 of the 300-person battalion surrendering in Mariupol, the unit's drone operators and anti-air unit continue to operate, attached to the remains of the 36th that was able to fight out of the city.

On April 14, 2022, the unit shot down a Russian Orlan-10 drone. On June 29, 2023, the Battalion's "Gryphon" unit released a video of them using western anti-tank weapons to destroy Russian tanks.

David Axe has alleged that after being rebuilt and replenished, the battalion returned to combat in the Kherson region in 2023, and took part in the combat north of Kharkiv near Vovchansk in the summer of 2024.

The battalion participated in the Ukrainian operation in Russia's Kursk region. On 18 August 2024, a video was published of the battalion's soldiers removing a Russian flag in the village of Apanasovka in Kursk. On 13 September, it was reported that elements of the 501st had repelled a Russian assault on the nearby village of Vishnevka.

On 16 March 2026 the unit was awarded the Presidential Award For Courage and Bravery by the President of Ukraine Volodymyr Zelenskyy.

== Structure ==
- 501st Separate Marine Battalion
  - Battalion Headquarters
  - 1st Marine Company
  - 2nd Marine Company
  - FPV Drone Unit "Gryphon" (БпЛА «Грифон»)
  - Air Assault Platoon
  - Amphibious Vehicle Platoon
  - Mortar Company
  - Logistics Company
  - Anti-tank Platoon
  - Reconnaissance platoon
  - Engineer platoon
  - Communications platoon
  - Medical platoon
