= Novy Put, Kursk Oblast =

Novy Put Новый Путь
- Rural settlement
- Interactive map of Novy Put
- Location of Novy Put Novy Put (Russia)
- Coordinates: 51°18′N 34°30′E
- Country: Russia
- Federal subject: Kursk Oblast
- Administrative district: Glushkovsky District
- Selsoviet: Vesyoloye

Population (2010 Census)
  - Total: 5
  - Estimate (2010): 5 (0%)
- Time zone: UTC+3 (MSK)
- Postal code: 307452
- OKTMO ID: 38604412126

Novy Put (Russian: Новый Путь; literally: New Way) is a rural type settlement in western Russia, in Glushkovsky District of Kursk Oblast.

== Geography ==
The settlement is located 215 metres (705 ft) northwards of the Russian-Ukrainian border, 126 kilometres (78 mi) southwest of Kursk, 11.5 kilometres (7.1 mi) southwest of the district centre — urban type settlement of Glushkovo, 3.5 kilometres (2.2 mi) from the village council centre — Vesyoloye.

== History ==
=== Russian invasion of Ukraine ===
The settlement came under the control of the Armed Forces of Ukraine in the middle of September 2024 as part of the Ukrainian operation in the Kursk Oblast. of the Russian invasion of Ukraine. By middle of October the settlement was regained by the Russian Armed Forces.
