= Tolpino, Kursk Oblast =

Tolpino Толпино
- Village
- Location of Tolpino
- Location of Tolpino Tolpino (Russia)
- Coordinates: 51.45278°N 34.90194°E
- Country: Russia
- Federal subject: Kursk Oblast
- Administrative district: Korenevsky District
- Selsoviet: Tolpino

Population (2010 Census)
  - Total: 602
- Time zone: UTC+3 (MSK)
- Postal code(s): 307442
- OKTMO ID: 38618448101

Tolpino (Russian: Толпино) is a village in Korenevsky District, Kursk Oblast, Russia. Administrative centre of Tolpino village council.

== Geography ==
The village is located on the Krepna River (a tributary of the Seym), 25 kilometres (16 mi) from the Russian-Ukrainian border, 95 kilometres (59 mi) southwest of Kursk, 5 kilometres (3.1 mi) north of the district centre — urban-type settlement Korenevo.

== History ==
=== Russo-Ukrainian War ===
Battles were reported near the settlement in August 2024.
