= Olgovka, Kursk Oblast =

Olgovka Ольговка
- Village
- Interactive map of Olgovka
- Location of Olgovka Olgovka (Russia)
- Coordinates: 51.40167°N 35.01556°E
- Country: Russia
- Federal subject: Kursk Oblast
- Administrative district: Korenevsky District
- Selsoviet: Olgovka

Population (2010 Census)
  - Total: 674
  - Estimate (2010): 674 (0%)
- Time zone: UTC+3 (MSK)
- Postal code: 307424
- OKTMO ID: 38618432101

Olgovka (Russian: Ольговка, Ukrainian: Ольгівка) is a village in Korenevsky District, Kursk Oblast, Russia. It is the administrative centre of the Olgovka village council.

== Geography ==
The village is located on the Krepna River (a tributary of the Seym), 19 kilometres (12 mi) from the Russian-Ukrainian border, 90 kilometres (56 mi) southwest of Kursk, 9 kilometres (5.6 mi) east of the district centre — urban-type settlement Korenevo.

== History ==
=== Russo-Ukrainian War ===
Battles were reported near the settlement in August 2024.
