= Oktyabrskoye, Kursk Oblast =

Oktyabrskoye, Kursk Oblast may refer to:

- Oktyabrsky, Dmitriyevsky District, Kursk Oblast, a settlement in Melovsky Selsoviet of Dmitriyevsky District
- Oktyabrsky, Lgovsky District, Kursk Oblast, a khutor in Gorodensky Selsoviet of Lgovsky District
- Oktyabrskoye, Rylsky District, Kursk Oblast, a selo in Oktyabrsky Selsoviet of Rylsky District
- Oktyabrskoye, Sovetsky District, Kursk Oblast, a selo in Oktyabrsky Selsoviet of Sovetsky District
