= Korenevsky =

Korenevsky (masculine), Korenevskaya (feminine), or Korenevskoye (neuter) may refer to:

- Korenevsky District, a district of Kursk Oblast, Russia
- Korenevskaya, a rural locality (a village) in Arkhangelsk Oblast, Russia
