= Zvannoye =

Zvannoye Званное
- Village
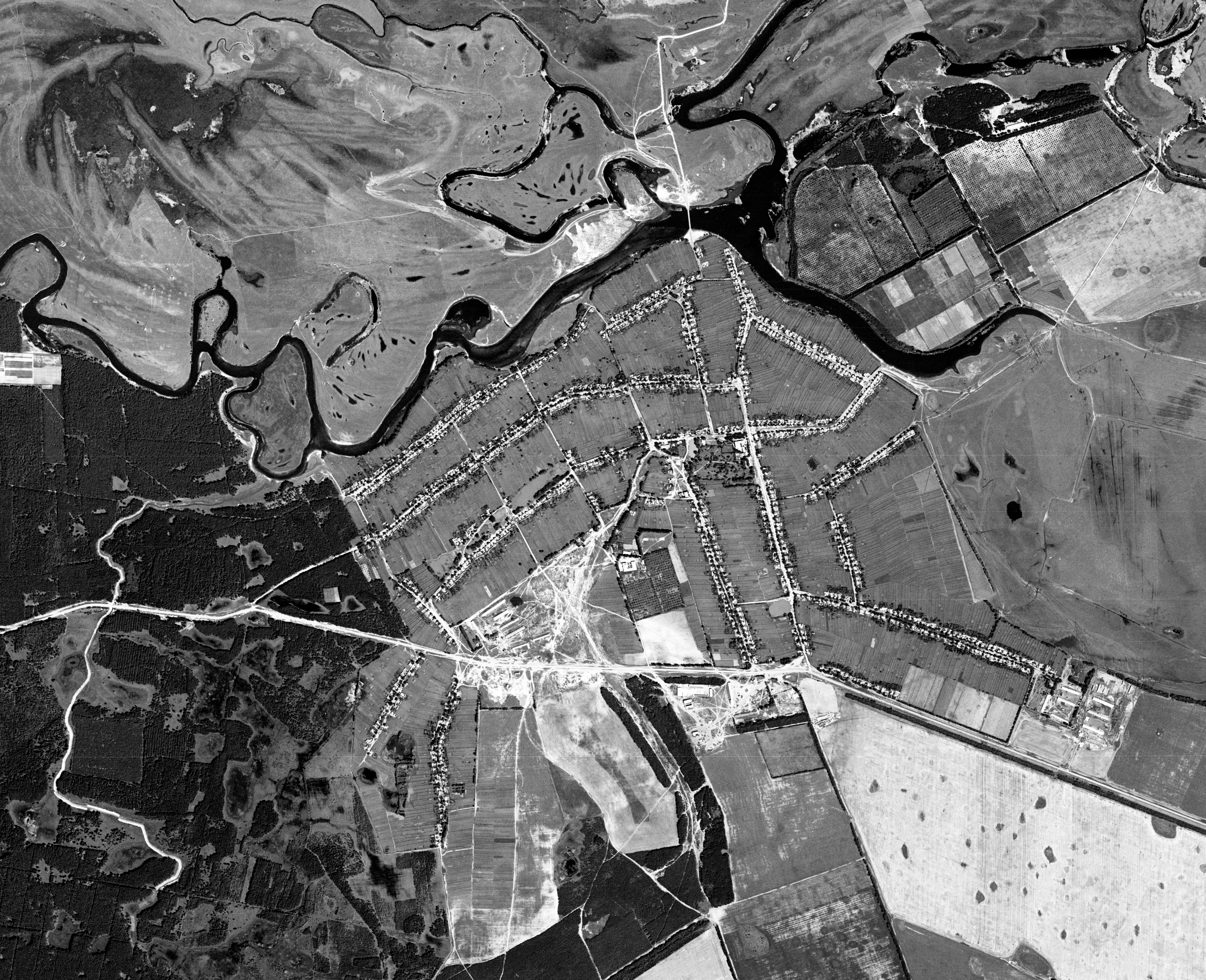
- Aerial view of 1972
- Interactive map of Zvannoye
- Location of Zvannoye Zvannoye (Russia)
- Coordinates: 51°22′32″N 34°32′38″E
- Country: Russia
- Federal subject: Kursk Oblast
- Administrative district: Glushkovsky District
- Selsoviet: Zvannoye
- Founded: 1656

Population (2010 Census)
  - Total: 498
  - Estimate (2010): 1,838 (+269.1%)
- Time zone: UTC+3 (MSK)
- Postal code: 307470
- OKTMO ID: 38604420101

Zvannoye (Russian: Званное) is a village in western Russia, in Glushkovsky District of Kursk Oblast.

== Geography ==
It is situated mainly on the left bank of the Seym, 7 kilometres (4.3 mi) from the district centre Glushkovo.

== History ==
=== Russian invasion of Ukraine ===
The Ukrainian air force claimed it had attacked a second bridge in Russia's Kursk region in the middle of August 2024 as part of the August 2024 Kursk Oblast incursion of the Russian invasion of Ukraine.
