= 116th Mechanized Brigade =

Ukrainian Ground Forces unit

- 116-та окрема механізована бригада
- Shoulder Sleeve Insignia
- Active: January 30, 2023 - present
- Country: Ukraine
- Branch: Ukrainian Ground Forces
- Role: Mechanized Infantry
- Part of: 10th Army Corps
- Motto: Vivere est vincere
- Engagements: Russo-Ukrainian War: 2023 Ukrainian Counteroffensive; Battle of Huliaipole; Battle of Robotyne; Battle of Avdiivka; Kupiansk offensive
- Website: https://www.facebook.com/svirsvova73

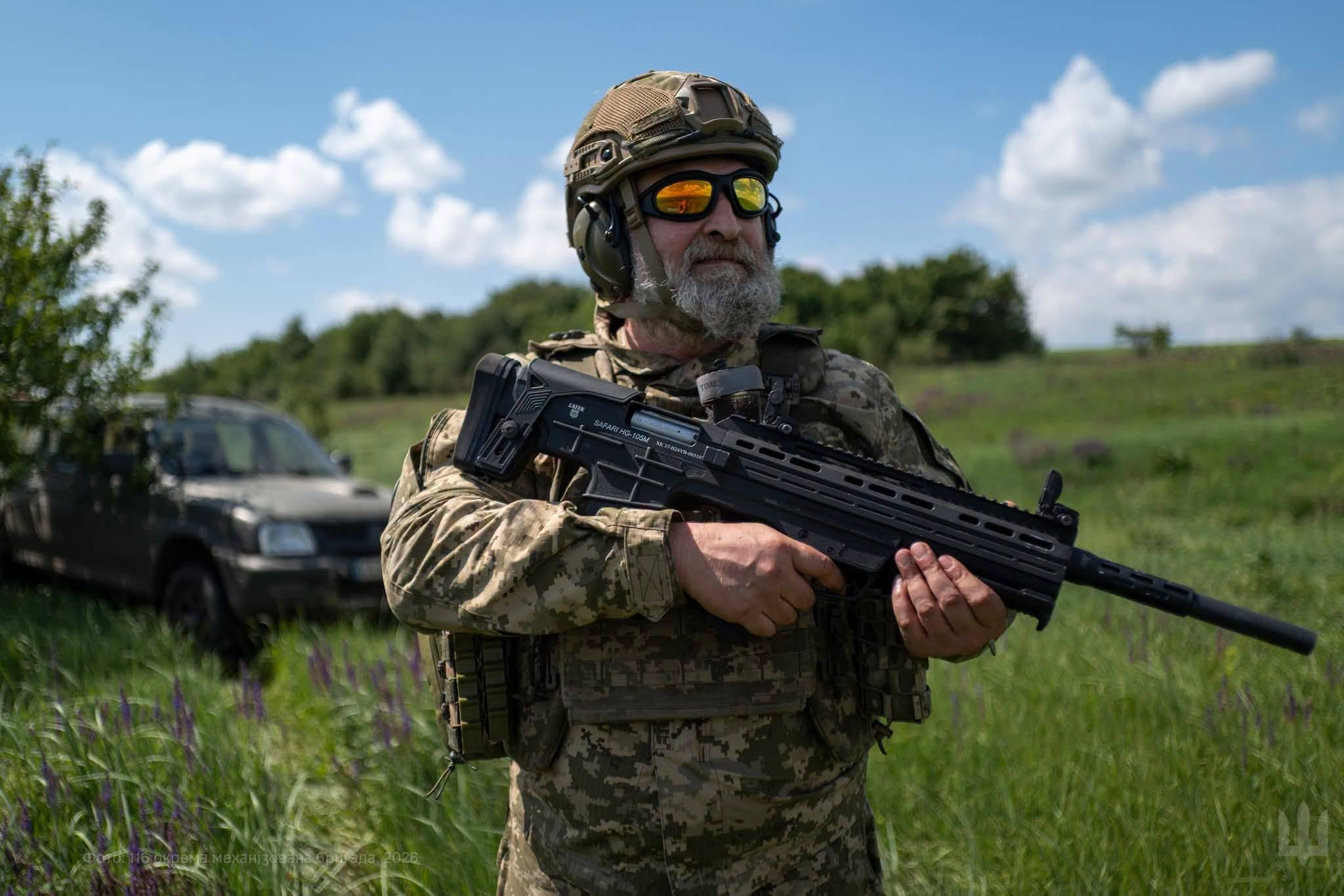
Soldier of the Brigade during anti drone training

The 116th Mechanized Brigade (Ukrainian: 116-та окрема механізована бригада) is a brigade of the Ukrainian Ground Forces.

== History ==
The brigade has fought in Huliaipole, Robotyne and Avdiivka.

Five members of the brigade were killed in action on 2 August 2023 as part of assault operations in Polohy Raion of Zaporizhzhia Oblast. On 17 August 2023, the brigade was visited by Ukrainian president Volodymyr Zelenskyy while it was fighting near Robotyne.

The brigade fought on the Avdiivka front in late 2023. In November 2023, it was reported that elements of the 116th Brigade were involved in combat on the Marinka front.

As of June 2024, units of the 116th Mechanized Brigade were involved in combat at Vovchansk.

Elements of the 116th Brigade announced that they had entered Russia's Kursk Oblast 8 August 2024, as part of the Ukrainian operation in the region. By 14 September, elements of the 116th Brigade conducted a new breakthrough of the Russia-Ukraine border at a new section in the Kursk Oblast, near the village of Vesyoloye.

In December 2024, elements of the brigade were on the Pokrovsk front.

== Structure ==
As of 2024, the brigade's structure is as follows:

- 116th Mechanized Brigade
  - Headquarters & Headquarters Company
  - 1st Mechanized Battalion
  - 2nd Mechanized Battalion
  - 3rd Assault Battalion
  - Tank Battalion "Zakhar"
  - Field Artillery Regiment
    - Surveillance and Target Acquisition Battery "Khorne Group"
      - Aerial Reconnaissance Unit "Falcon Group"
    - 1st Self-propelled Artillery Battalion (2S1 Gvozdika)
    - 2nd Self-propelled Artillery Battalion (AS-90)
    - Rocket Artillery Unit
    - Anti-Tank Unit
  - Anti-Aircraft Defense Battalion
  - Reconnaissance Company
  - Engineer Battalion
  - Logistic Battalion
  - Maintenance Battalion
  - Signal Company
  - Radar Company
  - Medical Company
  - Chemical, Biological, Radiological and Nuclear Defense Company
