= Snagost, Kursk Oblast =

Snagost Снагость
- Village
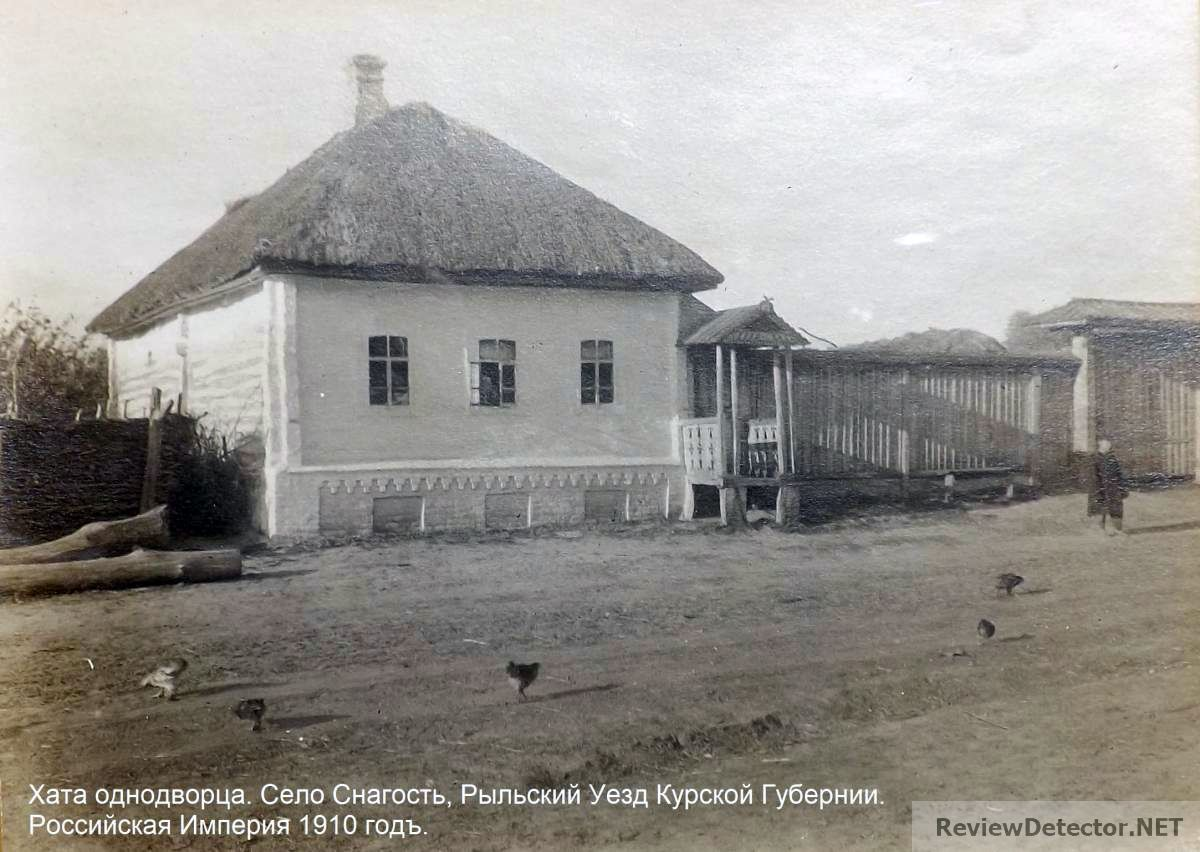
- House in Snagost in 1910
- Interactive map of Snagost
- Location of Snagost Snagost (European Russia) Snagost (Russia)
- Coordinates: 51°18′58″N 34°53′26″E
- Country: Russia
- Federal subject: Kursk Oblast
- Administrative district: Korenevsky District
- Selsoviet: Snagost
- Founded: 1707
- Elevation: 143 m (469 ft)

Population (2010 Census)
  - Total: 494
  - Estimate (2010): 494 (0%)
- Time zone: UTC+3 (MSK)
- Postal code: 307431
- OKTMO ID: 38618444101

Snagost (Russian: Снагость) is a village in Korenevsky District, Kursk Oblast, Russia. It is the administrative centre of Snagost village council.

== Geography ==
The village is located on the right bank of the Snagost River opposite the confluence of the Muzhitsa and Blyakhovets rivers. It is located 9 kilometres (5.6 mi) from the Russian-Ukrainian border, 102 kilometres (63 mi) southwest of Kursk, 10.5 kilometres (6.5 mi) south of the district centre — urban-type settlement Korenevo. The absolute height is 143 metres above sea level.

== History ==
Snagost was founded in 1707 by Ivan Mazepa.

In the late 19th century, it hosted two small annual fairs and a weekly market.

=== Russian invasion of Ukraine ===
The settlement came under the control of the Armed Forces of Ukraine in August 2024 as part of the August 2024 Kursk Oblast incursion of the Russian invasion of Ukraine.

Russian forces recaptured the settlement some time between 10 and 13 September 2024, during a Russian counterattack.
