= Stepanchenko =

Stepanchenko (Ukrainian or Russian: Степанченко) is a gender-neutral Ukrainian surname. It may refer to:

- Sergey Stepanchenko
- Vasyl Stepanchenko
