= Obshchy Kolodez =

Obshchy Kolodez Общий Колодезь
- Village
- Location of Obshchy Kolodez
- Location of Obshchy Kolodez Obshchy Kolodez (Russia)
- Coordinates: 51.4886°N 35.1061°E
- Country: Russia
- Federal subject: Kursk Oblast
- Administrative district: Korenevsky District
- Selsoviet: Sheptukhov

Population (2010 Census)
  - Total: 602
- Time zone: UTC+3 (MSK)
- Postal code(s): 307423
- OKTMO ID: 38618452136

Obshchy Kolodez (Russian: Общий Колодезь) is a village in Korenevsky District, Kursk Oblast, Russia.

== Geography ==
The village is located in the basin of the Krepna River (a tributary of the Seym), 30 kilometres (19 mi) from the Russian-Ukrainian border, 80 kilometres (50 mi) southwest of Kursk, 17.5 kilometres (10.9 mi) northeast of the district centre — urban-type settlement Korenevo, 6.5 kilometres (4.0 mi) from the centre of the village council - the village Sheptuhovka.

== History ==
=== Russo-Ukrainian War ===
On 13 August 2024, during the August 2024 Kursk Oblast Incursion in the Russo-Ukrainian War, the Russian Ministry of Defence claimed to have repelled Ukrainian assaults near the village.
