= Vnezapnoye =

Vnezapnoye Внезапное
- Village
- Interactive map of Vnezapnoye
- Location of Vnezapnoye Vnezapnoye (Russia)
- Coordinates: 51.24167°N 34.88028°E
- Country: Russia
- Federal subject: Kursk Oblast
- Administrative district: Korenevsky District
- Selsoviet: Viktorovka

Population (2010 Census)
  - Total: 245
  - Estimate (2010): 245 (0%)
- Time zone: UTC+3 (MSK)
- Postal code: 307433
- OKTMO ID: 38618412111

Vnezapnoye (Russian: Внезапное) is a village in western Russia, in Korenevsky District of Kursk Oblast.

== Geography ==
The village is located on the Blyakhovets River, 4.5 kilometres (2.8 mi) from the Russian-Ukrainian border, 106 kilometres (66 mi) southwest of Kursk, 19 kilometres (12 mi) south of the district centre – urban-type settlement Korenevo, 1.5 kilometres (0.93 mi) from the centre of the village council — Viktorovka. The absolute height is 156 metres above sea level.

== History ==
=== Russian invasion of Ukraine ===
The settlement came under the control of the Armed Forces of Ukraine in the middle of August 2024 as part of the August 2024 Kursk Oblast incursion of the Russian invasion of Ukraine.

The settlement was later claimed by Russia's Ministry of Defence to have been liberated on 10 September 2024.
