= Gordeyevka, Kursk Oblast =

Gordeyevka Гордеевка
- Village
- Interactive map of Gordeyevka
- Location of Gordeyevka Gordeyevka (Russia)
- Coordinates: 51°12′N 34°54′E
- Country: Russia
- Federal subject: Kursk Oblast
- Administrative district: Korenevsky District
- Selsoviet: Viktorovka

Population (2010 Census)
  - Total: 138
  - Estimate (2010): 138 (0%)
- Time zone: UTC+3 (MSK)
- Postal code: 307433
- OKTMO ID: 38618412121

Gordeyevka (Russian: Гордеевка) is a village in western Russia, in Korenevsky District of Kursk Oblast.

== Geography ==
The village is located on the Blyakhovets River, near the Russian-Ukrainian border, 108 kilometres (67 mi) southwest of Kursk, 22.5 kilometres (14.0 mi) south of the district centre — urban-type settlement Korenevo, 2.5 kilometres (1.6 mi) from the centre of the village council — Viktorovka. The absolute height is 171 metres above sea level.

== History ==
=== Russian invasion of Ukraine ===
The settlement came under the control of the Armed Forces of Ukraine as part of the August 2024 Kursk Oblast incursion of the Russian invasion of Ukraine, and was later on recaptured by Russian armed forces.
