= Popovo-Lezhachi =

Village in Kursk, Russia

Popovo-Lezhachi Попово-Лежачи
- Village
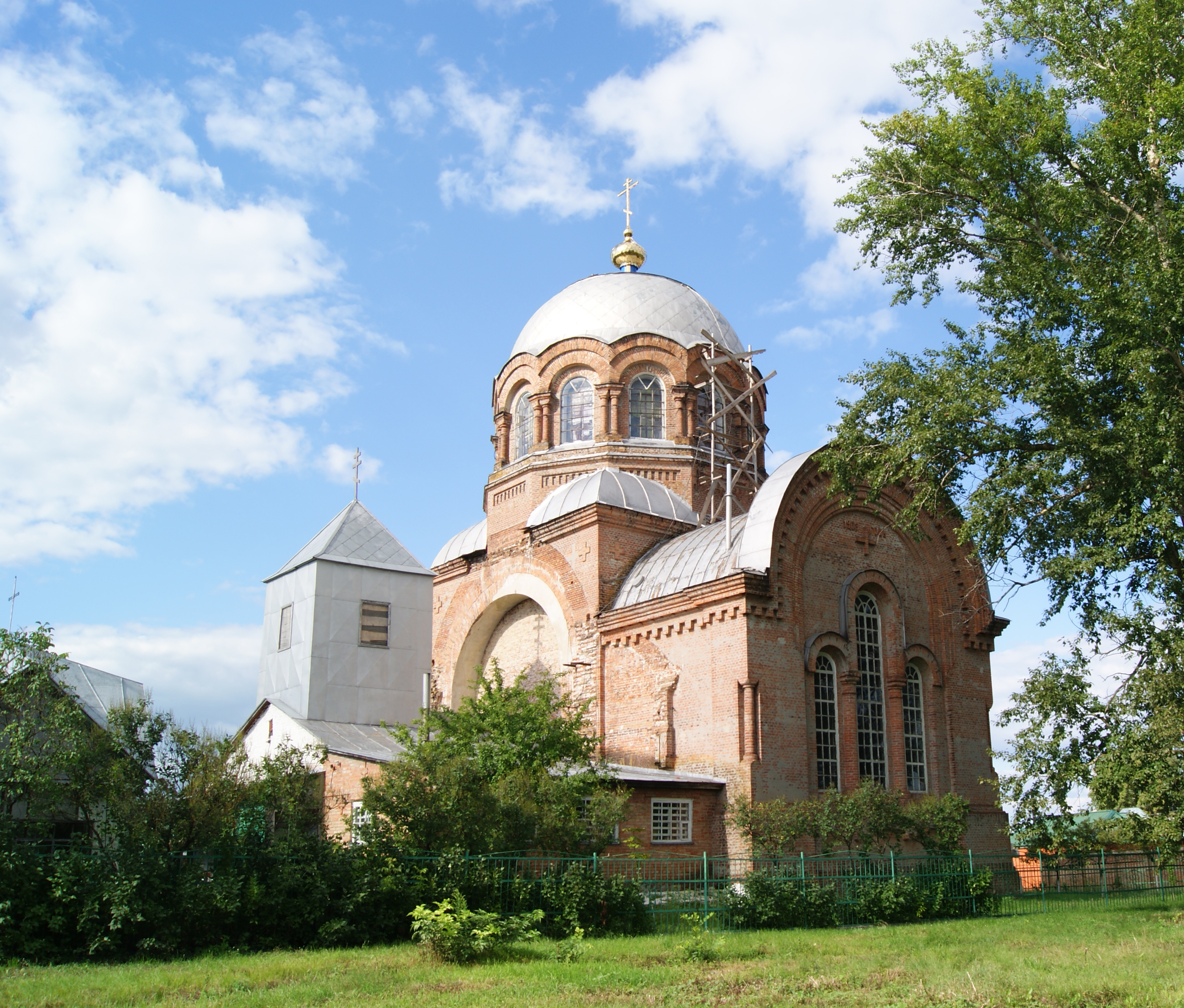
- A church
- Interactive map of Popovo-Lezhachi
- Location of Popovo-Lezhachi within Russia Popovo-Lezhachi (Russia)
- Coordinates: 51.289983°N 34.307772°E
- Country: Russia
- Oblast: Kursk Oblast
- District: Glushkovsky District
- Elevation: 139 m (456 ft)

Population (2010)
  - Total: 1,177
- Time zone: UTC+3
- Postal code: 307491
- Area code: +7 47132

Popovo-Lezhachi (Russian: Попово-Лежачи; Ukrainian: Попово-Лежачі) is a village (село) in Glushkovsky District in Kursk Oblast of western Russia. The population was 1,177 as of 2010.

== Geography ==
The village is situated on the left bank of the Seym river, 3 kilometres (1.9 mi) of the Russian-Ukrainian border, 140 kilometres (87 mi) southwest of Kursk, and 23.5 kilometres (14.6 mi) southwest of the district centre - Glushkovo settlement. Popovo-Lezhachi borders Tyotkino to the southwest.

== History ==
The settlement was first mentioned in a written source in 1685.

Popovo-Lezhachi has suffered casualties during the ongoing Russian invasion of Ukraine.
