= Darino, Kursk Oblast =

Darino Дарьино
- Village
- Interactive map of Darino
- Location of Darino Darino (Russia)
- Coordinates: 51°18′N 35°00′E
- Country: Russia
- Federal subject: Kursk Oblast
- Administrative district: Sudzhansky District
- Selsoviet: Sverdlikovo

Population (2010 Census)
  - Total: 144
  - Estimate (2010): 144 (0%)
- Time zone: UTC+3 (MSK)
- Postal code: 307813
- OKTMO ID: 38640474106

Darino (Russian: Дарьино) is a village in western Russia, in Sudzhansky District of Kursk Oblast.

== Geography ==
The village is located in the southwestern part of the Central Russian Upland, in the forest steppe zone, on the right bank of the Snagosti River, 3.55 kilometres (2.21 mi) of the Russian-Ukrainian border, 97.25 kilometres (60.43 mi) southwest of Kursk, about 17 kilometres (11 mi) northwest of the town of Sudzha, the administrative centre of the district. The absolute height is 167 metres above sea level.

== History ==
=== Russian invasion of Ukraine ===
The settlement came under the control of the Armed Forces of Ukraine, as part of the August 2024 Kursk Oblast incursion of the Russian invasion of Ukraine, and was regained by Russian Forces in September, the same year.
