= Vasyl Stepanchenko =

Ukrainian aircraft engineer (1914–1995)

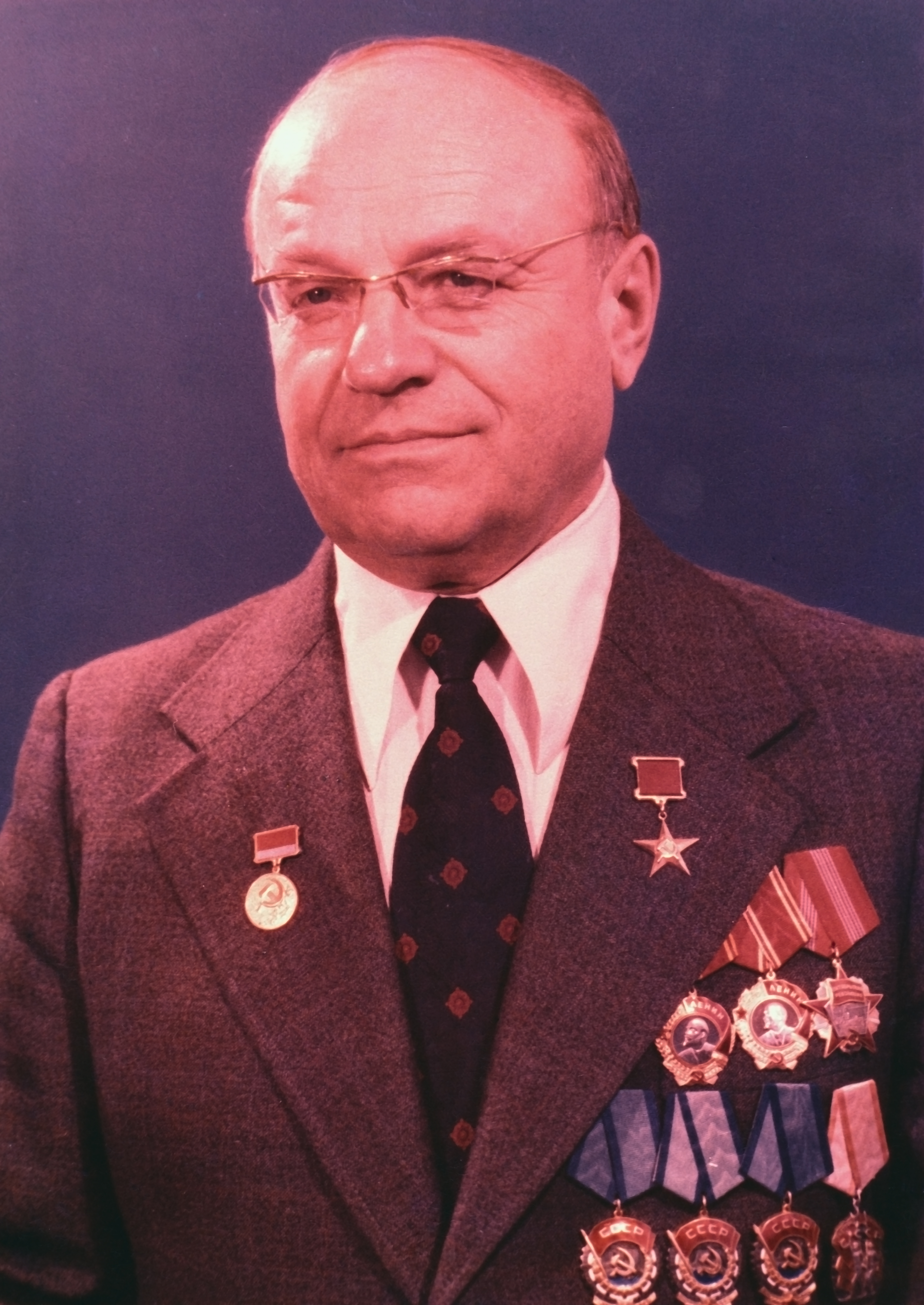
- Born: 22 March 1914; Vesyoloye, Rylsky Uyezd, Kursk Governorate, Russian Empire
- Died: 7 September 1995 (aged 81); Kyiv, Ukraine
- Resting place: Baikove Cemetery
- Occupation: Aircraft engineer

Vasyl Oleksiyovych Stepanchenko (Ukrainian: Василь Олексійович Степанченко; 22 March 1914, Vesyoloye – 7 September 1995, Kyiv) was a Soviet and Ukrainian aircraft engineer. Hero of Socialist Labour (1971).

== Biography ==
Stepanchenko was born in a large Ukrainian family in the village of Vesyoloye.

In 1940 he graduated with honors from the Kazan Aviation Institute. After graduating from high school, he worked at the Kazan Aircraft Plant, where he worked his way from master to deputy head of production.

In 1949–1954 he was the chief engineer of the Omsk Aircraft Plant, where serial production of the first IL-28 jet bombers was established at that time.

In 1954–1958 he was the general director of the Kyiv Aviation Plant (now the Aviant plant). Under his leadership, the plant was reconstructed, caused by the preparation for a serial production of a new An-24 aircraft.

In 1958–1965 he was the first deputy chairman of the Kyiv Sovnarkhoz.

In 1965 he was appointed the general director of the Kyiv Aircraft Plant, which he ruled until 1979. During this period, the production capacity of the company increased more than fivefold. Among his achievements are: establishing the serial production of the An-2 aircraft; release of the prototypes of the transport aircraft An-8; preparing the release of An-124 "Ruslan".

He died in Kyiv at the age of 81, and was buried at the Baikove Cemetery.

== Awards and honours ==
- Order of the Badge of Honour (1945)
- Two Orders of Lenin (1949, 1971)
- Hero of Socialist Labour (1971)
- Order of the October Revolution
- State Prize of Ukraine in Science and Technology
- Three Orders of the Red Banner of Labour
