= Apanasovka, Korenevsky District, Kursk Oblast =

Village in Kursk Oblast, Russia

Apanasovka Апанасовка
- Village
- Interactive map of Apanasovka
- Location of Apanasovka Apanasovka (Russia)
- Coordinates: 51°17′40″N 34°51′36″E
- Country: Russia
- Federal subject: Kursk Oblast
- Administrative district: Korenevsky District
- Selsoviet: Komarovka

Population (2010 Census)
  - Total: 199
  - Estimate (2010): 199 (0%)
- Time zone: UTC+3 (MSK)
- Postal code: 307432
- OKTMO ID: 38618416106

Apanasovka (Russian: Апанасовка) is a village in western Russia, in Korenevsky District of Kursk Oblast.

== Geography ==
The village is located on the Muzhitsa River, 105 kilometres (65 mi) southwest of Kursk, 13 kilometres (8.1 mi) south of the district centre — urban-type settlement Korenevo, 5.5 kilometres (3.4 mi) from the village council centre — Komarovka.

== History ==
=== Russian invasion of Ukraine ===
The settlement came under the control of the Armed Forces of Ukraine in the middle of August 2024 as part of the August 2024 Kursk Oblast incursion of the Russian invasion of Ukraine.
