= Nikolayevo-Darino =

Nikolayevo-Darino Николаево-Дарьино (Russian)
- Village
- Interactive map of Nikolayevo-Darino
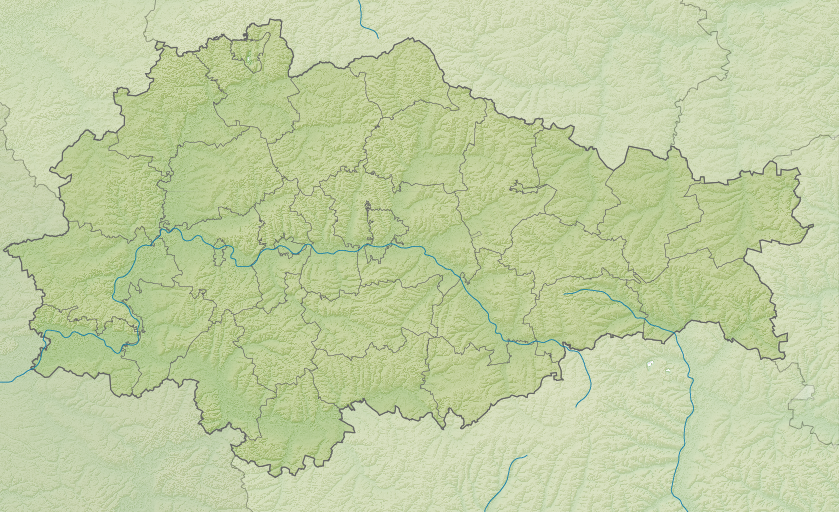
- Location within Kursk Oblast Location within Russia
- Coordinates: 51.243906°N 35.004957°E
- Country: Russia
- Oblast: Kursk Oblast
- District: Sudzhansky District
- Elevation: 173 m (568 ft)

Population (2010)
  - Total: 153
- Time zone: UTC+03:00
- Postal code: 307812

Nikolayevo-Darino (Russian: Николаево-Дарьино) is a village in western Russia, in Sudzansky District of Kursk Oblast.

The village is located not far from the Russian-Ukrainian border, 99.48 kilometres (61.81 mi) southwest of Kursk, 18 kilometres (11 mi) south of the district centre of Sudzha.

== History ==
=== Russian invasion of Ukraine ===
The settlement came under the control of the Armed Forces of Ukraine on 6 August 2024 as part of the 2024 Kursk Offensive of the Russian invasion of Ukraine. Russian media reported, that it was recaptured on January 27th, 2025 and later, it was taken fully.
