= Demidovka, Belgorod Oblast =

Village in Belgorod Oblast, Russia

Demidovka Демидовка
- Interactive map of Demidovka
- Location of Demidovka Demidovka (Belgorod Oblast)
- Coordinates: 50°56′43″N 35°23′32″E
- Country: Russia
- Federal subject: Belgorod Oblast
- Administrative district: Krasnoyaruzhsky District

Population
  - Estimate (2010): 272 )
- Time zone: UTC+3 (MSK)
- Postal code: 309433
- OKTMO ID: 14643410111

Demidovka (Russian: Демидовка) is a settlement in the Krasnoyaruzhsky District of Belgorod Oblast, Russia.

On 20 March 2025, during the Russian Invasion of Ukraine, the Command post at Demidovka was destroyed by the Air Force of Ukraine, during the 2025 Belgorod incursion. According to a post on Telegram by pro-Russian milblogger Yuri Podolyaka, Ukrainian Armed Forces entered the village on 24 March, gaining a foothold in its south and trying to dislodge Russian forces from the north.
