= Vvedenskaya Gotnya =

Vvedenskaya Gotnya Введенская Готня
- Selo
- Location within Belgorod Oblast Location within Russia
- Coordinates: 50°44′N 35°53′E
- Country: Russia
- Region: Belgorod Oblast
- District: Rakityansky District
- Time zone: UTC+3:00

Vvedenskaya Gotnya (Russian: Введенская Готня) is a rural locality (a selo) and the administrative center of Vvedeno-Gotnyanskoye Rural Settlement, Rakityansky District, Belgorod Oblast, Russia. The population was 431 as of 2010. There are 12 streets.

== Geography ==
Vvedenskaya Gotnya is located 14 km southeast of Rakitnoye (the district's administrative centre) by road. Trefilovka is the nearest rural locality.

Gotnya is a railway junction point for two lines, Lgov-Kharkiv and Vorozhba-Belgorod and a spur.
