= Nico Lange =

German politician (born 1975)

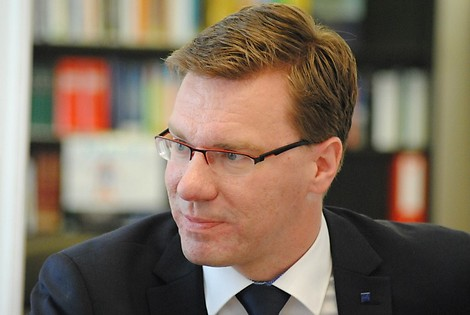
Nico Lange

Nico Lange (born 23 March 1975) is a German politician of the Christian Democratic Union (CDU) who served as former Federal Minister of Defence Annegret Kramp-Karrenbauer's chief of staff.

== Early life and education ==
Lange was born 1975 in Berlin and studied political science at the University of Greifswald. As part of his military service, he served in Bosnia and Herzegovina and in Kosovo.

== Career ==
On a scholarship of Robert Bosch Foundation, Lange taught international relations at Saint Petersburg State University from 2004 until 2006.

From 2006 to 2012 Lange headed the CDU-affiliated Konrad Adenauer Foundation office in Kyiv.

From 2012 until 2017, Lange led the foundation's domestic policy team in Berlin. In this capacity, he was appointed by CDU Secretary General Peter Tauber to a commission tasked with drafting proposals for reforming the party between 2013 and 2017. In 2014, he chaired a task force on the future of political parties in Germany. He was also member of a CDU working group committee on domestic policy reforms. After the CDU lost elections in Baden-Württemberg in 2016, Lange accompanied the party's deputy chairman Thomas Strobl when he toured the state visiting local chapters and discussing with members.

From 2017 until 2018, Lange headed the foundation's Washington office.

In April 2018 Lange became deputy general manager of the CDU, under the leadership of newly elected chairwoman Annegret Kramp-Karrenbauer.

== Controversy ==
In June 2010 Lange was arrested for supposed espionage by the Ukrainian counterespionage agency, the Security Service of Ukraine. After a harsh diplomatic intervention by the German government, Lange was released after some hours, citing Ukrainian officials, that a 'misapprehension' had taken place.
