= Pozhnia =

Pozhnia Пожня
- Village
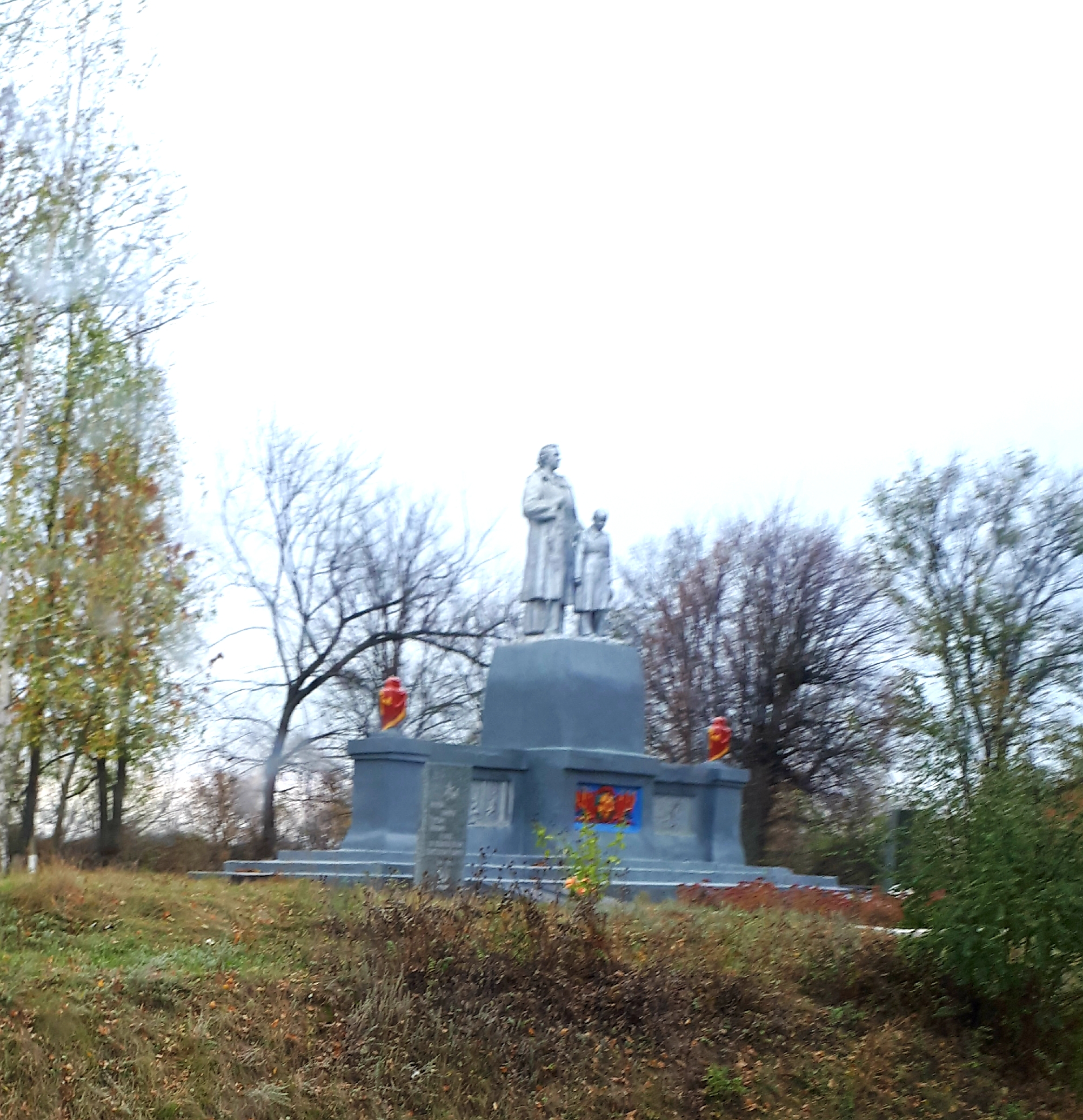
- Interactive map of Pozhnia
- Location of Pozhnia within Ukraine Pozhnia (Sumy Oblast)
- Coordinates: 50°30′41″N 35°20′02″E
- Country: Ukraine
- Oblast: Sumy Oblast
- Raion: Okhtyrka Raion
- Hromada: Velykopysarivska settlement hromada
- Founded: 1628

Area
  - Total: 30.17 km^{2} (11.65 sq mi)
- Elevation: 127 m (417 ft)

Population (2001 census)
  - Total: 793
  - Density: 26.3/km^{2} (68.1/sq mi)
- Time zone: UTC+2 (EET)
  - Summer (DST): UTC+3 (EEST)
- Postal code: 42824
- Area code: +380 5457
- KATOTTH: UA59040030120038500

Pozhnia (Ukrainian: Пожня; Russian: Пожня) is a village in Velykopysarivska settlement hromada, Okhtyrka Raion, Sumy Oblast, Ukraine. It is located 70.65 kilometres (43.90 mi) southeast by south (SEbS) from the centre of Sumy city, 7.65 kilometres (4.75 mi) westwards from the Russian-Ukrainian border.

== Geography ==
The village lies on the banks of Pozhnia and Vorsklytsia rivers. The absolute height is 127 metres above sea level.

== History ==
=== Russo-Ukrainian war (2022–present) ===
The settlement came under attack of Russian forces during the Russia-Ukraine war in August 2024.

== Demographics ==
In 2001 the settlement had 793 inhabitants, whose native languages were 20.78% Ukrainian and 79.22% Russian.
