= Chermoshnoy, Oktyabrsky District, Kursk Oblast =

Rural locality in Kursk Oblast, Russia

Chermoshnoy Чермошной
- Khutor
- Interactive map of Chermoshnoy
- Location of Chermoshnoy Chermoshnoy (Kursk Oblast)
- Coordinates: 51°34′10″N 35°50′24″E
- Country: Russia
- Federal subject: Kursk Oblast
- Administrative district: Oktyabrsky District
- SelsovietSelsoviet: Dyakonovsky

Population (2010 Census)
  - Total: 7
  - Estimate (2010): 7 (0%)

Municipal status
  - Municipal district: Oktyabrsky Municipal District
  - Rural settlement: Dyakonovsky Selsoviet Rural Settlement
- Time zone: UTC+3 (MSK)
- Postal code: 307200
- Dialing code: +7 47142
- OKTMO ID: 38628412126
- Website: djakonovo.rkursk.ru

Chermoshnoy (Russian: Чермошной) is a rural locality (a khutor) in Dyakonovsky Selsoviet Rural Settlement, Oktyabrsky District, Kursk Oblast, Russia. Population: 7 (2010 census); 9 (2002 census);

== Geography ==
The khutor is located 62 km from the Russia–Ukraine border, 26 km south-west of Kursk, 11 km south-west of the district center – the urban-type settlement Pryamitsyno, 8.5 km from the selsoviet center – Dyakonovo.

Climate

Chermoshnoy has a warm-summer humid continental climate (Dfb in the Köppen climate classification).

== Transport ==
Chermoshnoy is located on the roads of regional importance 38K-010 ("Crimea Highway" – Ivanino, part of the European route E38) and 38K-004 (Dyakonovo – Sudzha – border with Ukraine), 7.5 km from the nearest railway halt 439 km (railway line Lgov I — Kursk).

The rural locality is situated 37 km from Kursk Vostochny Airport, 113 km from Belgorod International Airport and 236 km from Voronezh Peter the Great Airport.
