= Vesyoloye, Kursk Oblast =

Vesyoloye Весёлое
- Village
- Interactive map of Vesyoloye
- Location of Vesyoloye Vesyoloye (Russia)
- Coordinates: 51°18′N 34°36′E
- Country: Russia
- Federal subject: Kursk Oblast
- Administrative district: Glushkovsky District
- Selsoviet: Vesyoloye

Population (2010 Census)
  - Total: 757
  - Estimate (2010): 757 (0%)
- Time zone: UTC+3 (MSK)
- Postal code: 307452
- OKTMO ID: 38604412101

Vesyoloye (Russian: Весёлое) is a village in western Russia, in Glushkovsky District of Kursk Oblast.

== Geography ==
The village is located in the basin of the river Vedima (left tributary of the Seym), 3.5 kilometres (2.2 mi) from the Russian-Ukrainian border, 124.00 kilometres (77.05 mi) southwest of Kursk, 8.00 kilometres (4.97 mi) southwest of the district centre — Glushkovo settlement.

== History ==
=== Russo-Ukrainian war ===
The settlement came under the control of the Armed Forces of Ukraine in September 2024 as part of the Ukrainian operation in the Kursk region during the Russia-Ukraine war, and was regained by Russian forces by the end of the same month.
