= Oktyabrskoye, Rylsky District, Kursk Oblast =

Oktabrskoye Октябрьское
- Selo
- Location within Kursk Oblast Location within Russia
- Coordinates: 51°34′36″N 34°48′08″E
- Oblast: Kursk
- Raion: Rylsky

Oktyabrskoye (Russian: Октябрьское) is a village in the Rylsky District of Kursk Oblast in Russia.

== Geography ==
The village is 98 km west of Kursk, 8.5 km east of the district's center Rylsk, and 4.5 km from the center of the village council Stepanovka.

== Demographics ==
Population
2002	2010
285	284

== Transportation ==
Oktyabrskoye is located on the regional highway 38K-017 that leads to the Ukraine border, 6 km from the nearest Rylsk railway station.

It is 162 km from Belgorod International Airport.
