= Glushkovo, Glushkovsky District, Kursk Oblast =

Urban-type settlement in Kursk Oblast, Russia

Glushkovo Глушково
- Urban-type settlement
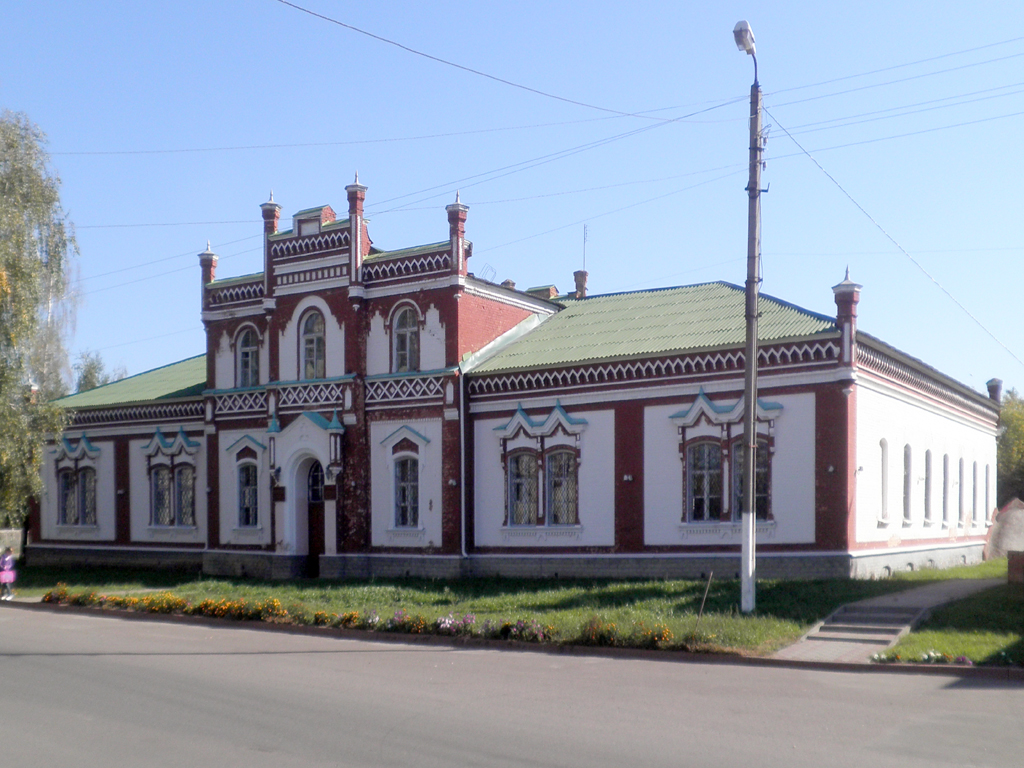
- Interactive map of Glushkovo
- Location of Glushkovo Glushkovo (Russia)
- Coordinates: 51.3379°N 34.6411°E
- Country: Russia
- Federal subject: Kursk Oblast
- Administrative district: Glushkovsky District
- Founded: 1647

Population (2010 Census)
  - Total: 5,349
  - Estimate (1 January 2024): 4,540 (−15.1%)
- Time zone: UTC+3 (MSK)
- Postal code: 307450
- OKTMO ID: 38604151051

Glushkovo (Russian: Глушково) is an urban locality (an urban-type settlement) in the Glushkovsky District of Kursk Oblast, Russia. In the 19th century the village was an administrative center of Glushkovskaya volost, Rylsky Uyezd, Kursk Governorate. Population: 4,785 (2021 census); 5,349 (2010 census); 5,748 (2002 census); 6,413 (1989 Soviet census). The settlement is adjacent to the Seym river.

== History ==
=== Russo-Ukrainian War ===
The town was ordered evacuated by Kursk governor Alexei Smirnov on 14 August 2024, days after Ukraine launched an incursion into the region.

On 16 August, the Ukrainian military destroyed a major road bridge over the Seym river in the town.
