= Korenevsky District =

Korenevsky District Кореневский район
- District
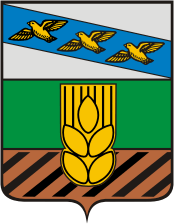
- Coat of arms
- Location of Korenevsky District in Kursk Oblast
- Coordinates: 51°24′29″N 34°53′53″E
- Country: Russia
- Federal subject: Kursk Oblast
- Established: 30 July 1928
- Administrative center: Korenevo

Area
  - Total: 873 km^{2} (337 sq mi)

Population (2010 Census)
  - Total: 18,294
  - Density: 21.0/km^{2} (54.3/sq mi)
  - Urban: 33.4%
  - Rural: 66.6%

Administrative structure
  - Administrative divisions: 1 Work settlements, 16 Selsoviets
  - Inhabited localities: 1 urban-type settlements, 51 rural localities

Municipal structure
  - Municipally incorporated as: Korenevsky Municipal District
  - Municipal divisions: 1 urban settlements, 9 rural settlements
- Time zone: UTC+3 (MSK)
- OKTMO ID: 38618000
- Website: http://astrokursk.ru/rayony-kurskoy-oblasti/10-korenevskiy-rayon/korenevskiy-rayon-kurskoy-oblasti.html

Korenevsky District (Russian: Кореневский райо́н) is an administrative and municipal district (raion), one of the twenty-eight in Kursk Oblast, Russia. It is located in the southwest of the oblast. The area of the district is 873 square kilometers (337 sq mi). Its administrative center is the urban locality (a work settlement) of Korenevo. Population: 15,018 (2021 Census); 18,294 (2010 Census); 21,474 (2002 Census); 23,183 (1989 Soviet census). The population of Korenevo accounts for 37.0% of the district's total population.

== Geography ==
Korenevsky District is located in the southwest of Kursk Oblast, on the border with Ukraine. The terrain is hilly plain; the district lies on the Orel-Kursk plateau of the Central Russian Upland. The main river in the district is the Seym River, tributary of the Desna River which flows west through Ukraine to the Dnieper River. The district is 65 km (40 mi) southwest of the city of Kursk and 480 km (300 mi) southwest of Moscow. The area measures 40 km (25 mi; north-south), and 25 km (16 mi; west-east); total area is 1,135 km2 (438 sq mi; 3.8% of Kursk Oblast). The administrative center is the town of Korenevo.

The district is bordered on the west by Glushkovsky District, on the north-west by Rylsky District, on the north-east by Lgovsky District, on the east by Sudzhansky District, and on the south by Ukraine's Sumy Raion.
