= 72nd Motor Rifle Division =

- 72-я мотострелковая дивизия
- Shoulder sleeve patch of the unit
- Active: 2024 – present
- Country: Russia
- Branch: Russian Ground Forces
- Type: Mechanized infantry
- Size: Division
- Part of: 44th Army Corps
- Garrison/HQ: Karelia
- Engagements: Russo-Ukrainian War; Russian invasion of Ukraine; Kursk campaign; Northern Kharkiv front

The 72nd Motorized Rifle Division (Russian: 72-я мотострелковая дивизия) is a tactical formation of the Ground Forces of the Russian Armed Forces.

== History ==
The 72nd Motorized Rifle Division was formed in the spring of 2024 as part of the 44th Army Corps of the Leningrad Military District.

The division saw its first combat in the northern Kharkiv Oblast in May 2024.

Since August 2024, it has been participating in fighting in the Kursk Oblast. On August 11, the first battalions of the 72nd Division began arriving in the Kursk Oblast. On August 20, the 30th Motorized Rifle Regiment was transferred from the Kharkiv Oblast to the Kursk Oblast.

On August 24, 2024, the 30th Motorized Rifle Regiment, together with the Akhmat Special Forces, fought near Martynovka in the Sudzhansky District of the Kursk Oblast. From August 26, 2024, the 41st Motorized Rifle Regiment operated in the area of the villages of Starytsia and Ogurtsovo, Chuhuiv Raion, Kharkiv Oblast.

On August 30, 2024, the 30th Motorized Rifle Regiment operated in the area of Malaya Loknya, north of Sudzha.

On October 2, 2024, the 41st Motorized Rifle Regiment captured the village of Staritsa, Chuguevsky District, Kharkiv Oblast.

On October 15, the 30th Motorized Rifle Regiment, together with the 40th and 810th Marine Brigades, launched an offensive along the Borki-Ozerki River south of Ulanok, Sudzhansky District, Kursk Oblast, with the aim of outflanking Ukrainian troop positions.

On December 11, 2024, the 30th Motorized Rifle Regiment, together with North Korean troops, the 155th and 810th Separate Motorized Rifle Brigade, the 22nd Separate Special Rifle Brigade, the ArBat Battalion, and the Kursk Knights detachment of Kursk volunteers, liberated the village of Plyokhovo in the Sudzhansky District of Kursk Oblast.

On January 6, 2025, the 30th Motorized Rifle Regiment, together with the 2nd Separate Special Rifle Brigade, the Akhmat Special Forces Unit, and the 11th Guards Air Assault Brigade, cleared enemy forces from areas near the khutor of Berdin and the village of Novosotnitsky in the Bolshesoldatsky District of Kursk Oblast.

From January 10, 2025, the 30th Motorized Rifle Regiment fought in the area of the village of Pogrebki in the Sudzhansky District of Kursk Oblast.

As of February 25, 2025, the 41st Motorized Rifle Regiment continued combat operations in the northern Kharkiv region.

On February 26, 2025, the 22nd Motorized Rifle Regiment was operating near the village of Novaya Sorochina in the Sudzhansky District.

On March 4, 2025, the 22nd Motorized Rifle Regiment, together with the 9th Motorized Rifle Regiment, was operating near the village of Malaya Loknya in the Sudzhansky District.

On March 7, 2025, the 22nd Motorized Rifle Regiment liberated the village of Staraya Sorochina in the Sudzhansky District.

On March 8, 2025, the 30th Motorized Rifle Regiment, together with the 1427th Motorized Rifle Regiment, liberated the village of Cherkasskoye Porechnoye in the Sudzhansky District. The 22nd Motorized Rifle Regiment liberated the villages of Viktorovka and Nikolayevka.

On March 9, 2025, the 30th Motorized Rifle Regiment captured the village of Kubatkin near Kazachya Loknya in the Sudzhansky District.

On March 11, 2025, the 22nd Motorized Rifle Regiment, together with the 155th Separate Motorized Rifle Brigade, liberated the village of Knyazhiy-1 in the Sudzhansky District.

On March 12, 2025, the 22nd Motorized Rifle Regiment, together with the 11th Separate Airborne Brigade and the 2nd Separate Special Forces Brigade, liberated the city of Sudzha in the Kursk Oblast.

From March 25-26, 2025, the 22nd and 30th Motorized Rifle Regiments began operating in the Guyevo area, south of Sudzha.

On April 8, 2025, the 22nd Motorized Rifle Regiment, along with units of the Russian Naval Infantry, captured Huyevo. The 41st Motorized Rifle Regiment continued to operate in the Kharkiv Oblast.

On April 11, 2025, Ukrainian HIMARS air strikes struck the command post of the 30th Motorized Rifle Regiment in Guyevo, wounding the regiment commander.

From April 14, 2025, the 30th Motorized Rifle Regiment operated in the area of the Gornalsky Belogorsky Monastery in the Sudzhansky District.

On April 26, 2025, the 22nd Motorized Rifle Regiment, along with Russian Naval Infantry troops and the 1427th Motorized Rifle Regiment, captured the village of Gornal, the last settlement in the Kursk Oblast under the control of the Ukrainian Armed Forces.

== Composition ==
  - 22nd Motor Rifle Regiment (military unit 01069)
  - 30th Motor Rifle Regiment (military unit 72162)
  - 41st Motor Rifle Regiment (military unit 72164)
  - 10th Self-Propelled Artillery Regiment (military unit 72168)
  - 49th Separate Tank Battalion (military unit 72170)
