= Ukrainian occupation of Kursk Oblast =

Military occupation

- Military occupation
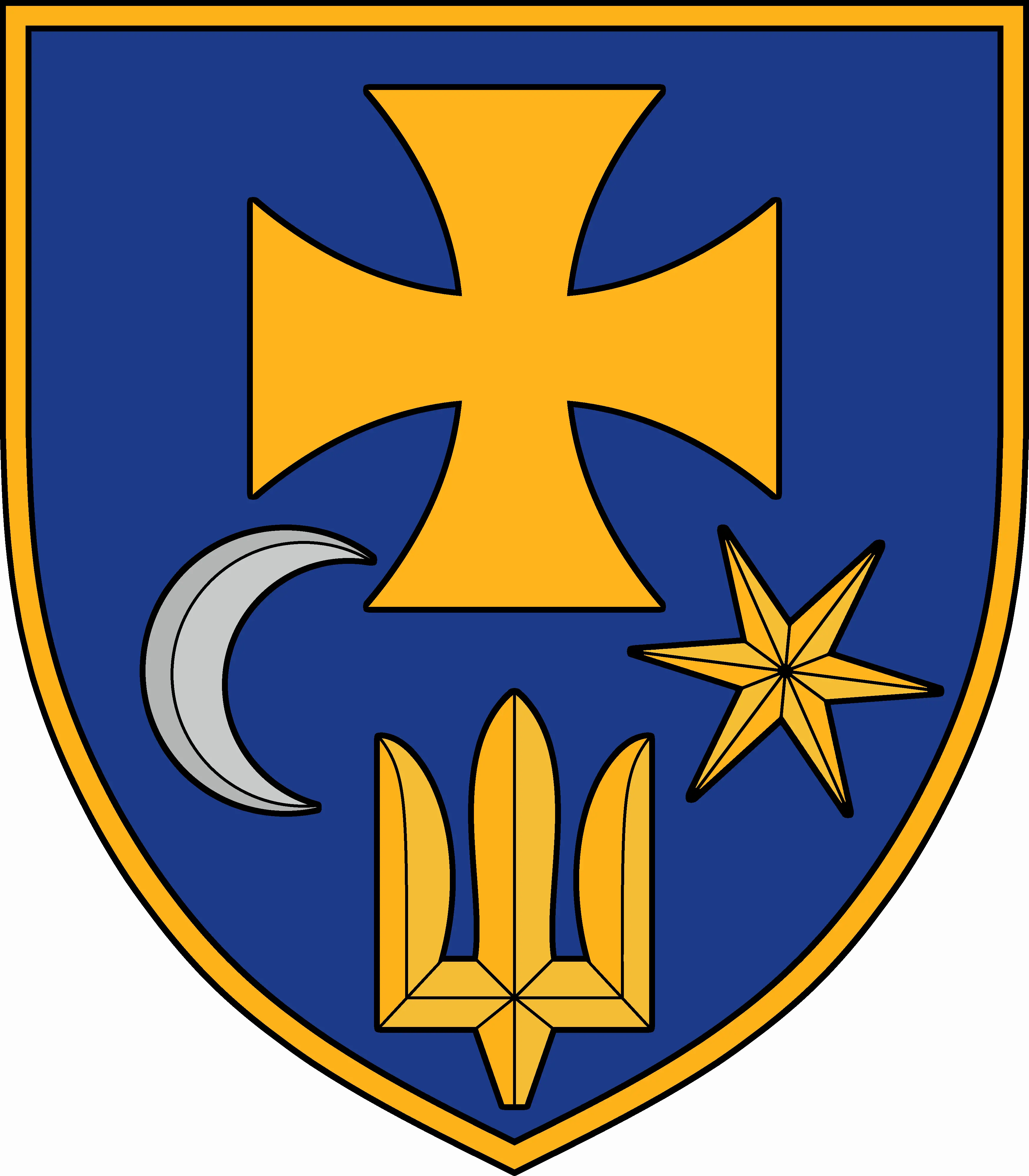
- Flag Seal

- Map showing the claimed extent of Ukrainian-held territory as of 28 April 2025
- Occupying power: Ukraine
- Beginning of Kursk offensive: 6 August 2024
- Military commandant's office established: 15 August 2024
- Largest settlement: Sudzha (from 15 August 2024 to 12 March 2025); Guyevo (from 12 March to 7 April 2025); Gornal (from 7 to 28 April 2025)

Government
  - Type: Military administration
  - Head of military commandant's office: Eduard Moskaliov

On 6 August 2024, during the Russo-Ukrainian War, the Armed Forces of Ukraine launched an offensive into Russia's Kursk Oblast, occupying parts of the region. It was the first time since World War II that Russian territory was occupied by a foreign military. Ukrainian forces occupied several settlements, including the town of Sudzha, until March 2025.

== History ==
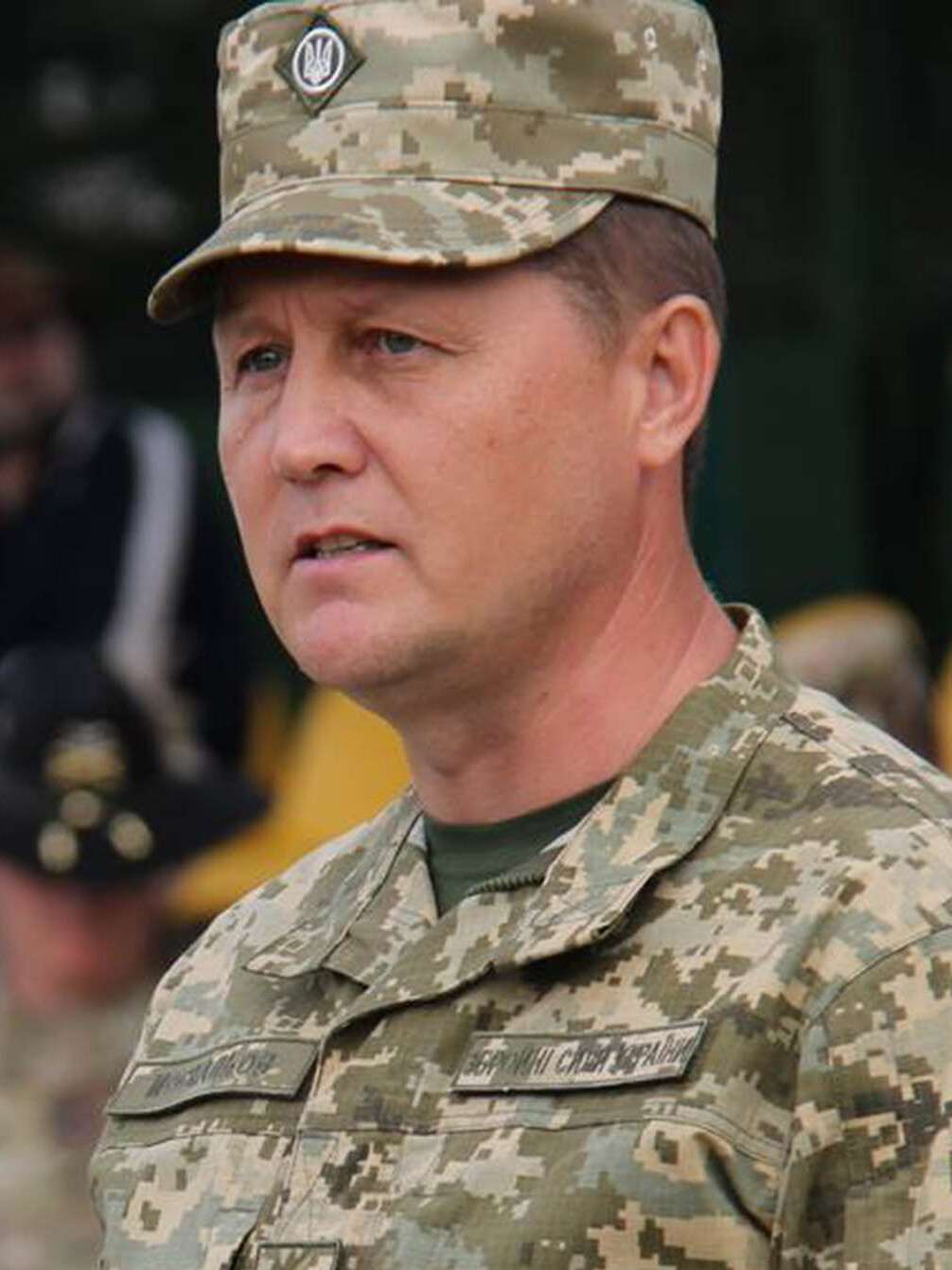
Eduard Moskaliov was named head of the Kursk Oblast military commandant's office

On 15 August 2024, Ukrainian military commander Oleksandr Syrskyi announced the establishment of a military administration in occupied parts of Kursk Oblast to be headed by major general Eduard Moskaliov, who would head the military commandant's office. Syrskyi said that 82 settlements in the oblast were under Ukrainian control. On 19 August, Ukrainian President Volodymyr Zelenskyy said that Ukrainian forces were in control of over 92 settlements in Kursk Oblast and 1,250 square kilometers of Russian territory.

On 3 September, Zelenskyy said in an interview that Ukraine was planning to "indefinitely" hold Kursk Oblast's seized territories, in an attempt to force Putin to the negotiating table. By November 2024, Ukraine had lost control of more than 40% of the territory it initially occupied in the region.

Sudzha was the largest settlement in Kursk Oblast to have come under Ukrainian control. By 12 March 2025, it had been retaken by Russian forces amid a sudden advance in which they retook much of the Ukrainian-held portion of the Kursk Oblast.

== Activities ==
Ukrainian officials stated that the purpose of the military administration was to provide humanitarian aid to civilians, maintain public service and to keep law and order in territories controlled by the Ukrainian armed forces. Ukrainian authorities said in August that they planned to allow international humanitarian organizations to access the areas of Kursk Oblast that they controlled.

A curfew between the hours of 17:00 and 10:00 was introduced in Sudzha by the military commandant's office on 23 August 2024.

== Civilian life under occupation ==
In August 2024, Sudzha residents told CNN that Ukrainian Ground Forces troops had provided food to locals who remained in the city.

On 18 September, Ukraine stated that 23 Russian civilians had been killed in Russian shelling since late August. In November, 46 remaining local residents were evacuated via Ukraine to Kursk.

According to reports by Western journalists, Russian flags were removed from administrative buildings shortly after the territory came under Ukrainian control, though Ukrainian flags were not raised in their place. Local residents interviewed by American media said that Ukrainian soldiers treated them well, that they were unaware of any local civilians being killed, and confirmed that Ukrainian forces distributed food and water. Some residents also spoke Ukrainian. According to Politico, Ukraine sought to contrast its conduct in occupied Russian territory with Russia's conduct in occupied Ukrainian territories.

In an investigation, The New York Times interviewed nearly 20 Russian civilians and reviewed videos, photographs, and satellite imagery. The newspaper reported that drone footage from the area near Korenevo appeared to show at least seven people killed during the first days of the Ukrainian offensive, most of them in civilian clothing. Bodies were seen lying on a road near destroyed vehicles, including one person riding a bicycle. Volunteer Maria Skrob, who assisted in transporting bodies to a morgue, stated that 15 people were killed in the incident after allegedly being caught in an ambush on 11 August. Skrob and residents of the nearby village of Kurilovka alleged that Ukrainian troops fired on fleeing civilians. The New York Times said it could not independently verify those claims and noted that the area was an active combat zone, making it impossible to determine responsibility. Ukrainian military officials rejected reports of civilian deaths as Russian propaganda.

Residents of Kurilovka also alleged that Ukrainian soldiers fired on fleeing civilians and killed several people. According to their accounts, at least four civilian vehicles were shot at, including one in which a pregnant woman was reportedly killed. Another vehicle was destroyed in an explosion, which Ukrainian soldiers reportedly said had been caused by a landmine. The New York Times noted that the circumstances of these incidents were difficult to verify because fighting in the area was ongoing. While some visual evidence of civilian deaths existed, the newspaper stated that responsibility could not be determined from the available material.

Some residents interviewed by The New York Times described Ukrainian troops as courteous. However, one verified video showed Ukrainian soldiers, one wearing a helmet bearing SS insignia, mocking an elderly Russian man and calling him a "Russian pig" in broken German.

Verified videos published by Ukrainian soldiers and reviewed by The New York Times showed Ukrainian strikes on residential areas that destroyed homes and infrastructure. In some cases, Russian soldiers could be seen entering buildings before they were struck. The newspaper also noted that Russian forces shelled residential areas during operations to drive Ukrainian troops from Kursk Oblast. As of early September, according to Politico, Russia had not presented substantial accusations that Ukraine had violated the laws of war in Kursk Oblast.

Despite the danger posed by fighting in the area, many residents of Glushkovsky District, which became isolated from the rest of Russia in August after the destruction of three bridges over the Seym River, reportedly refused to evacuate because they feared their homes would be looted by Russian soldiers in their absence. Residents had previously complained of multiple incidents of looting by Russian troops.

Apti Alaudinov, commander of the Chechen Akhmat special forces unit, stated that Russian servicemen had committed nearly 200 crimes in Kursk Oblast, including rape and murder, though he did not specify the time period involved. The Wall Street Journal reported that surveillance footage from Russian-controlled territory, which it could not independently verify, appeared to show Russian soldiers looting a phone store and warehouse. Publication of the footage in local media prompted condemnation from Kursk governor's adviser Roman Alyokhin, who called for the death penalty for looters.

According to official figures, 112,000 people were evacuated from occupied areas, most to the city of Kursk. In early November, evacuees staged protests over the lack of a humanitarian corridor into occupied territory and the reduction of financial assistance. Residents also complained of inadequate evacuation efforts. Sudzhansky District head Aleksandr Bogachyov was subsequently dismissed.

According to local residents, Ukrainian soldiers distributed bread and water during the occupation. Residents also alleged that Ukrainian troops stationed military equipment between houses, resulting in artillery strikes on nearby positions and residential fires. BBC Verify authenticated several videos from Sudzha showing infantry fighting vehicles, including M2A2 Bradley vehicles, positioned between homes, but said it was unable to determine when the footage was recorded. Ukrainian military authorities declined to comment on journalists' questions regarding events in the city during Ukrainian control.

During and after the Ukrainian occupation, Russian authorities reported that Ukrainian forces detained several dozen local civilians and later treated them as prisoners of war. According to a Russian government‑prepared briefing titled "Liberation of the Kursk Region", some of these civilians were forcibly taken across the border and effectively registered as servicemen, with six men later returned to Russia in the course of a prisoner‑exchange process. In 2025, Russian and Ukrainian officials announced a major exchange of prisoners of war in which each side repatriated 270 military personnel and 120 civilians, with Russian sources stating that some of the civilians had been captured by Ukrainian troops in Kursk Oblast during the occupation. In March 2026, during the next exchange, 7 more civilians were returned.

== International legal aspects ==
International law scholar Chris O'Meara wrote that states may use force against another state only in self-defense. Following Russia's full-scale invasion of Ukraine in 2022, he argued that Ukraine has the right to defend itself, provided that such self-defense is necessary and proportionate. O'Meara stated that Ukraine's limited ability to strike launch sites for long-range attacks inside Russia may justify seizure of Russian territory for defensive purposes in order to prevent further attacks on Ukrainian civilians.

O'Meara further argued that proportionality in self-defense should be assessed in relation to Ukraine's ability to repel Russian aggression. He concluded that Ukraine's occupation of part of Kursk Oblast was proportionate and consistent with the right of self-defense under international law.

Oleksandr Merezhko, chairman of the Ukrainian parliament's Committee on Foreign Policy and Interparliamentary Cooperation, stated that Ukraine's seizure of part of Kursk Oblast constituted a military occupation. He argued that while Russia's occupation of Ukrainian territories constituted a crime of aggression, Ukraine's occupation of Russian territory was a response to that aggression.

== Control of settlements ==
Name	Pop.	District	Held by	As of	More information
Belaya	2,598	Belovsky	Russia	6 Aug 2024	
Bolshoye Soldatskoye	2,681	Bolshesoldatsky	Russia	6 Aug 2024	
Glushkovo	4,785	Glushkovsky	Russia	6 Aug 2024	
Korenevo	6,119	Korenevsky	Russia	6 Aug 2024	
Kurchatov	42,706	none	Russia	6 Aug 2024	
Kursk	440,052	none	Russia	6 Aug 2024	
Lgov	21,453	none	Russia	6 Aug 2024	
Malaya Loknya	799	Sudzhansky	Russia	9 Mar 2025	Mostly captured by Ukraine on 8 August 2024. Contested by Russia since 9 August 2024. Likely captured by Ukraine on 4 September 2024. Recaptured by Russia by 9 March 2025.
Rylsk	15,069	Rylsky	Russia	6 Aug 2024	
Slobodka-Ivanovka	58	Rylsky	Contested	11 Aug 2024	Captured by Ukraine since 11 August 2024.
Snagost	494	Korenevsky	Russia	14 Sep 2024	Contested by Ukraine on 8 August 2024. Likely fully recaptured by Russia on 9 August 2024. Contested by Ukraine since around 11 August 2024. Likely captured by Ukraine on 18 August 2024. Contested by Russia between around 10–12 September 2024. Claimed recaptured by Russian sources on 11 September 2024. Confirmed recaptured by Russia on 13 September 2024.
Sudzha	6,036	Sudzhansky	Russia	12 Mar 2025	Contested by Ukraine between around 6–14 August 2024. Claimed captured by Ukraine on 15 August 2024. Contested by Russia by 11 March 2025. Recaptured by Russia by 12 March 2025.
Tyotkino	3,852	Glushkovsky	Contested	7 May 2025	See also: 2025 Tyotkino incursion Contested by Ukraine from 7 May 2025. On Russia control by 15 June 2025.

== See also ==
- 2025 Belgorod Oblast incursion
- Russian-occupied territories of Ukraine
  - Russian occupation of Kharkiv Oblast
- Attacks in Russia during the Russian invasion of Ukraine
- List of military occupations
