= 44th Army Corps (Russian Federation) =

- 44-й армейский корпус
- Active: 2024–present
- Country: Russian Federation
- Branch: Russian Ground Forces
- Type: Operational Formation
- Size: Army Corps
- Part of: Leningrad Military District
- Corps HQ: Petrozavodsk, Republic of Karelia
- Engagements: Russian invasion of Ukraine; 2024 Kharkiv offensive; Kursk offensive

The 44th Army Corps (Russian: 44-й армейский корпус) is an operational-tactical formation of the Ground Forces of the Russian Armed Forces. It is part of the Leningrad Military District.

== History ==
Plans to form the corps were first announced in December 2022. The 44th Army Corps was created in 2024. It was formed in the Leningrad Military District in the Republic of Karelia. The corps includes the 72nd Motor Rifle Division (22nd, 30th, 41st Motor Rifle Regiment) and the 128th Separate Motor Rifle Brigade. In May 2024, the corps took part in the Northern Kharkiv offensive.

In the spring of 2025, during the Kursk offensive, troops of the 44th Army Corps were attacking Ukrainian forces in the Kursk Oblast near Oleshnya (southwest of Sudzha), Gogolevka and Guyevo, as well as in the north of the Sumy Oblast, Ukraine. As of December 2025, it took part in the battle of Vovchansk, which was later captured as part of the Northern Kharkiv offensive.

== Composition ==
Structure in 2024

- 72nd Motor Rifle Division
  - 22nd Motor Rifle Regiment
  - 30th Motor Rifle Regiment
  - 41st Motor Rifle Regiment
- 128th Separate Motor Rifle Brigade
