= Novoivanovka, Sudzhansky District, Kursk Oblast =

Novoivanovka Новоивановка
- Rural locality
- Location of Novoivanovka
- Location of Novoivanovka Novoivanovka (Russia)
- Coordinates: 51.322234°N 35.10573°E
- Country: Russia
- Federal subject: Kursk Oblast
- Administrative district: Sudzhansky District

Population (2010 Census)
  - Total: 228
- Time zone: UTC+3 (MSK)
- Postal code(s): 307818
- OKTMO ID: 38640463101

Novoivanovka (Russian: Новоивановка) is a village in Sudzhansky District, Kursk Oblast, Russia, about 9.96 kilometres (6.19 mi) north of the Russia–Ukraine border. It is the administrative centre of Novoivanovka Village Council. In August 2024, the village was under Ukrainian occupation. On 10 December 2024, Russian milbloggers claimed that Russian forces had retaken the village.

== Geography ==
The village is located in the south-west of Kursk Oblast, in the south-western part of the Central Russian Upland, in the forest-steppe zone, east of the 38K-030 motorway, at a distance of about 18 kilometres (in a straight line) north-west of the town of Sudzha, the administrative centre of the district. The absolute height is 152 metres above sea level.
