= Shchegolek =

Shchegolek Щеголек
- Village
- Interactive map of Shchegolek
- Location of Shchegolek
- Coordinates: 51°11′00″N 35°37′20″E
- Country: Russia
- Federal subject: Kursk Oblast
- Administrative district: Belovsky District
- SelsovietSelsoviet: Shchegolek

Population (2010 Census)
  - Total: 301
  - Estimate (2010): 303 (+0.7%)
- Time zone: UTC+3 (MSK)
- Postal code: 307922
- OKTMO ID: 38602460101

Shchegolek (Russian: Щеголек) is a village in western Russia, in Belovsky District of Kursk Oblast. It is the administrative centre of the Shchegolek village council, located at about 83.85 kilometres (52.10 mi) southwest by south (SWbS) of the center of Kursk city and at about 15 kilometres (9.3 mi) northwest of Belaya, the administrative center of the district.

== History ==
In May 2025, during the Russo-Ukrainian war, The governor of Kursk region claimed that three people were killed by Ukrainian drone strikes in the villages of Shchegolek and Zvannoye.
