= Russkoye Porechnoye =

Settlement in Kursk Oblast, Russia

Russkoye Porechnoye Русское Поречное
- Village
- Interactive map of Russkoye Porechnoye
- Location of Russkoye Porechnoye Russkoye Porechnoye (Russia)
- Coordinates: 51°18′N 35°18′E
- Country: Russia
- Federal subject: Kursk Oblast
- Administrative district: Sudzhansky District
- Selsoviet: Cherkasskoye Porechnoye

Population (2010 Census)
  - Total: 298
  - Estimate (2010): 298 (0%)
- Time zone: UTC+3 (MSK)
- Postal code: 307806
- OKTMO ID: 38640472141

Russkoye Porechnoye (Russian: Русское Поречное) is a village in western Russia, in Sudzhansky District of Kursk Oblast.

== Geography ==
The village is situated on the Sudzha River, 17.5 kilometres (10.9 mi) from the Russian-Ukrainian border, 75 kilometres (47 mi) south-west of Kursk, 16 kilometres (9.9 mi) north-east of the district centre — the town of Sudzha, 2 kilometres (1.2 mi) from the centre of the village council — Cherkasskoye Porechnoye.

== History ==
=== Russian invasion of Ukraine ===
The settlement witnessed fighting in 2024 and in 2025 as part of the Ukrainian operation in Kursk Oblast.

On January 19 2025, Agence France-Presse (AFP) reported that the Russian government had opened a criminal investigation into allegations that the Armed Forces of Ukraine committed war crimes against civilians in Russkoye Porechnoye. According to AFP, at the time Russian federal authorities claimed Ukrainian soldiers were responsible for the extrajudicial killings of 7 civilians.

On January 31, AFP reported that the Investigative Committee of Russia had identified 5 Ukrainian military personnel responsible for war crimes in Russkoye Porechnoye, including the extrajudicial killings of 22 civilians. These claims were studied in detail by the East StratCom Task Force and Conflict Intelligence Team, which found that they originated with a video statement made by a Ukrainian prisoner of war being interrogated by Russian soldiers. The CIT analysis noted signs of fabrication in the reports, including the statements made by the Ukrainian prisoner, whose formal language used in the confession is often used in staged videos from Russian security forces, indicating that the soldier was forced to confess to the killings under torture. The CIT further added that due to the village being in a grey zone and changing hands between Ukrainian and Russian control several times, it is impossible to immediately assert what had happened, including whether or not the people had been killed.
