= Oleshnya, Kursk Oblast =

Oleshnya Олешня
- Khutor
- Interactive map of Oleshnya
- Location of Oleshnya Oleshnya (European Russia) Oleshnya (Russia)
- Coordinates: 51.15194°N 35.14944°E
- Country: Russia
- Federal subject: Kursk Oblast
- Administrative district: Sudzhansky District

Population (2010 Census)
  - Total: 104
  - Estimate (2021 census): 98 (−5.8%)
- Time zone: UTC+3 (MSK)
- Postal code: 307814
- OKTMO ID: 38640433111

Oleshnya (Russian: Олешня) is a rural settlement (khutor) in western Russia, in Sudzansky District of Kursk Oblast.

The village borders in the west with the Russian-Ukrainian border and is located 98.44 kilometres (61.17 mi) southwest of Kursk and 18 kilometres (11 mi) south of the district centre of Sudzha.

== Russo-Ukrainian war ==
The settlement came under the control of the Armed forces of Ukraine on 6 August 2024 during the August 2024 Kursk Oblast incursion. The Russian Ministry of Defence claimed to have repelled Ukrainian assaults near the settlement on 13 August 2024. On 19 April 2025, Russia announced it has recaptured the settlement, leaving Ukraine with almost no territory in Kursk Oblast.

== Demographics ==
Year	Population
2002	158
2010	104
2021	98

Note: Census data

== Transportation ==
Oleshnya is located 2 km from the regional road 38 kilometres (0 mi) (Dyakonovo - Sudzha - border with Ukraine), 8.5 km from the road 38 kilometres (0 mi) (Rylsk - Korenevo - Sudzha), 9.5 km from the road 38 K (0 °C; 0 °F) (Lgov - Sudzha), 3.5 km from the inter-municipal road 38 newtons (0 lb_{f}) (Sudzha - Guyevo - Gornal - border with Ukraine), on roads 38 newtons (0 lb_{f}) (Gogolevka — Oleshnya) and 38 newtons (0 lb_{f}) (38N-609 — Oleshnya — 38K-004), 13 km from the nearest railway station in Sudzha (line Lgov I — Podkosylev).

117 km from V. G. Shukhov Airport (not far from Belgorod.
