= Klishino, Lgovsky District, Kursk Oblast =

Rural locality in Kursk Oblast, Russia

Klishino Клишино
- Village
- Interactive map of Klishino
- Location of Klishino Klishino (Kursk Oblast)
- Coordinates: 51°37′01″N 35°21′11″E
- Country: Russia
- Federal subject: Kursk Oblast
- Administrative district: Lgovsky District
- SelsovietSelsoviet: Bolsheugonsky

Population (2010 Census)
  - Total: 175
  - Estimate (2010): 175 (0%)

Municipal status
  - Municipal district: Lgovsky Municipal District
  - Rural settlement: Bolsheugonsky Selsoviet Rural Settlement
- Time zone: UTC+3 (MSK)
- Postal code: 307715
- Dialing code: +7 47140
- OKTMO ID: 38622410126
- Website: b-ugoni.ru

Klishino (Russian: Клишино) is a rural locality (Russian: деревня, lit. 'village') in Bolsheugonsky Selsoviet Rural Settlement, Lgovsky District, Kursk Oblast, Russia. Population: 175 (2010 census); 201 (2002 census);

== Geography ==
The village is located on the Seym River, 46 km from the Russia–Ukraine border, 59 km south-west of Kursk, 7 km south-east of the district center – the town Lgov, 4 km from the selsoviet center – Bolshiye Ugony.

Climate

Klishino has a warm-summer humid continental climate (Dfb in the Köppen climate classification).

== Transport ==
Klishino is located on the road of regional importance 38K-017 (Kursk – Lgov – Rylsk – border with Ukraine) as part of the European route E38, 2 km from the road of intermunicipal significance 38H-373 (38K-017 – Sugrovo – railway station Lgov). There is a railway halt 404 km (railway line Lgov I — Kursk).

The rural locality is situated 66 km from Kursk Vostochny Airport, 136 km from Belgorod International Airport and 269 km from Voronezh Peter the Great Airport.
