= Oleshnya (river) =

River in Kursk Oblast, Russia

Coordinates: 51°11′04″N 35°16′25″E

The Oleshnya (Ukrainian: and Russian: Олешня) or Alyoshnya (Russian: Алешня) is a small river that flows about 13 km from the settlement of Oleshnya to the town of Sudzha, where it joins the Sudzha, all within the Kursk oblast, Russia. Tributary of Sudzha (river).

The river is situated within the Russian border region occupied by Ukraine as part of the 2024 Kursk Oblast incursion.
