= Novaya Sorochina =

Novaya Sorochina Новая Сорочина
- Village
- Interactive map of Novaya Sorochina
- Location of Novaya Sorochina Novaya Sorochina (Russia)
- Coordinates: 51°24′N 35°12′E
- Country: Russia
- Federal subject: Kursk Oblast
- Administrative district: Sudzhansky District
- Selsoviet: Malaya Loknya

Population
  - Estimate (2010): 24 )
- Time zone: UTC+3 (MSK)
- Postal code: 307835
- OKTMO ID: 38640450126

Novaya Sorochina (Russian: Новая Сорочина) is a village in western Russia, in Sudzhansky District of Kursk Oblast.

== Geography ==
The village is located on the Malaya Loknya River (a tributary of the Loknya River in the Sudzha basin), 16 kilometres (9.9 mi) from the Russian-Ukrainian border, 80.79 kilometres (50.20 mi) southwest of Kursk, 19 kilometres (12 mi) north of the district centre — the town of Sudzha, 16 kilometres (9.9 mi) from the village council centre — Malaya Loknya.

== History ==
=== Russian invasion of Ukraine ===
The settlement witnessed fighting in 2024 as part of the 2024 Kursk offensive of the Russian invasion of Ukraine. Sometime during the offensive, Ukraine occupied Novaya Sorochina.

On 28 February 2025, Russian forces regained control of the village.
