= Spalnoye =

Spalnoye Спальное
- Village
- Interactive map of Spalnoye
- Location of Spalnoye Spalnoye (Russia)
- Coordinates: 51°06′N 35°30′E
- Country: Russia
- Federal subject: Kursk Oblast
- Administrative district: Sudzhansky District
- Selsoviet: Borki

Population (2010 Census)
  - Total: 139
  - Estimate (2010): 139 (0%)
- Time zone: UTC+3 (MSK)
- Postal code: 307824
- OKTMO ID: 38640410106

Spalnoye (Russian: Спальное) is a village in Sudzhansky District, Kursk Oblast, Russia.

== Geography ==
The village is located on the river Psyol, about 5.3 kilometres (3.3 mi) from the Russian-Ukrainian border, 88 kilometres (55 mi) southwest of Kursk, 18 kilometres (11 mi) southeast of the district centre — the town of Sudzha, 4.5 kilometres (2.8 mi) from the centre of the village council — the village of Borki.

== History ==
=== Russian invasion of Ukraine ===
The settlement came under attack of the Armed Forces of Ukraine in August 2024 as part of the August 2024 Kursk Oblast incursion of the Russian invasion of Ukraine. Russian forces recaptured the village by 2025.
