= Khitrovka, Kursk Oblast =

Khitrovka Хитровка
- Village
- Interactive map of Khitrovka
- Location of Khitrovka Khitrovka (Russia)
- Coordinates: 51°24′N 35°12′E
- Country: Russia
- Federal subject: Kursk Oblast
- Administrative district: Sudzhansky District
- Selsoviet: Pogrebki

Population (2010 Census)
  - Total: 139
  - Estimate (2010): 20 (−85.6%)
- Time zone: UTC+3 (MSK)
- Postal code: 307836
- OKTMO ID: 38640469161

Khitrovka (Russian: Хитровка) is a village in Sudzhansky District, Kursk Oblast, Russia.

== Geography ==
The village is located 21 kilometres (13 mi) northeast from the Russian-Ukrainian border (Sumy Oblast in Ukraine), in the southwestern part of the Central Russian Upland, in the forest steppe zone, on the left bank of the Malaya Loknya River, at a distance of about 21 kilometres (13 mi) (in a straight line) northwest of the town of Sudzha, the administrative centre of the district. The absolute height is 175 metres above sea level.

== History ==
=== Russian invasion of Ukraine ===
The settlement was affected by combat operations in September 2024 as part of the August 2024 Kursk Oblast incursion of the Russian invasion of Ukraine. It was captured by units of Ukraine's 95th Air Assault Brigade.
