= Martynovka, Kursk Oblast =

Martynovka Мартыновка
- Village
- Interactive map of Martynovka
- Location of Martynovka Martynovka (Russia)
- Coordinates: 51°12′N 35°24′E
- Country: Russia
- Federal subject: Kursk Oblast
- Administrative district: Sudzhansky District
- Selsoviet: Martynovka

Population (2010 Census)
  - Total: 687
  - Estimate (2010): 687 (0%)
- Time zone: UTC+3 (MSK)
- Postal code: 307833
- OKTMO ID: 38640453101

Martynovka (Russian: Мартыновка) is a village in Sudzhansky District, Kursk Oblast, Russia. It is the administrative centre of Martynovka village council.

== Geography ==
The village is located on the Smerditsa River (a tributary of Sudzha), 15 kilometres (9.3 mi) from the Russian-Ukrainian border, 80 kilometres (50 mi) southwest of Kursk, 9 kilometres (5.6 mi) northeast of the district centre — the town of Sudzha.

== History ==
=== Russian invasion of Ukraine ===
The settlement came under pressure of the Armed Forces of Ukraine in August 2024 as part of the August 2024 Kursk Oblast incursion of the Russian invasion of Ukraine. By 11 March 2025, Russian forces recaptured the village.
