= Berdin =

Berdin Бердин
- Khutor
- Interactive map of Berdin
- Location of Berdin Berdin (Russia)
- Coordinates: 51°18′N 35°24′E
- Country: Russia
- Federal subject: Kursk Oblast
- Administrative district: Bolshesoldatsky District
- Selsoviet: Bolshoye Soldatskoye

Population
  - Estimate (2010): 140 )
- Time zone: UTC+3 (MSK)
- Postal code: 307853
- OKTMO ID: 38603403126

Berdin (Russian: Бердин) is a rural type settlement (khutor) in western Russia, in Bolshesoldatsky District of Kursk Oblast.

The settlement witnessed battles between Russian and Ukrainian forces in the beginning of 2025, during the Kursk offensive.
