= Russkaya Konopelka =

Russkaya Konopelka Русская Конопелька
- Village
- Interactive map of Russkaya Konopelka
- Location of Russkaya Konopelka Russkaya Konopelka (Russia)
- Coordinates: 51°12′N 35°24′E
- Country: Russia
- Federal subject: Kursk Oblast
- Administrative district: Sudzhansky District
- Selsoviet: Makhnovka

Population (2010 Census)
  - Total: 205
  - Estimate (2010): 205 (0%)
- Time zone: UTC+3 (MSK)
- Postal code: 307821
- OKTMO ID: 38640456116

Russkaya Konopelka (Russian: Русская Конопелька) is a village in Sudzhansky District, Kursk Oblast, Russia.

== Geography ==
The village is located on the Konopelka River (a tributary of the Psel), about 13 kilometres (8.1 mi) from the Russian-Ukrainian border, 82 kilometres (51 mi) southwest of Kursk, 9 kilometres (5.6 mi) east of the district centre of Sudzha, 9 kilometres (5.6 mi) from the village council centre — the village of Makhnovka.

== History ==
=== Ukrainian invasion of Russia ===
The settlement was invaded and occupied by the Armed Forces of Ukraine in August 2024, as part of the August 2024 Kursk Oblast incursion of the Russian invasion of Ukraine. By February 2025, the village was recaptured by Russian forces.
