= Nizhniye Derevenki =

Rural locality in Kursk Oblast, Russia

Nizhniye Derevenki Нижние Деревеньки
- Selo
- Interactive map of Nizhniye Derevenki
- Location of Nizhniye Derevenki Nizhniye Derevenki (Kursk Oblast)
- Coordinates: 51°39′46″N 35°17′13″E
- Country: Russia
- Federal subject: Kursk Oblast
- Administrative district: Lgovsky District
- SelsovietSelsoviet: Bolsheugonsky
- First mentioned: 1699

Population (2010 Census)
  - Total: 583
  - Estimate (2010): 583 (0%)

Municipal status
  - Municipal district: Lgovsky Municipal District
  - Rural settlement: Bolsheugonsky Selsoviet Rural Settlement
- Time zone: UTC+3 (MSK)
- Postal code: 307753
- Dialing code: +7 47140
- OKTMO ID: 38622410116
- Website: b-ugoni.ru

Nizhniye Derevenki (Russian: Нижние Деревеньки) is a rural locality (Russian: село, lit. 'village') in Bolsheugonsky Selsoviet Rural Settlement, Lgovsky District, Kursk Oblast, Russia. Population: 583 (2010 census); 717 (2002 census);

== Geography ==
The village is located on the Seym River (at the confluence of the Apoka and Byk tributaries), 48 km from the Russia–Ukraine border, 62 km south-west of Kursk, 1 km north-east of the district center – the town Lgov, 10 km from the selsoviet center – Bolshiye Ugony.

Climate

Nizhniye Derevenki has a warm-summer humid continental climate (Dfb in the Köppen climate classification).

Climate data for Nizhniye Derevenki
Month	Jan	Feb	Mar	Apr	May	Jun	Jul	Aug	Sep	Oct	Nov	Dec	Year
Mean daily maximum °C (°F)	−3.9 (25.0)	−2.8 (27.0)	3.1 (37.6)	13.2 (55.8)	19.5 (67.1)	22.7 (72.9)	25.3 (77.5)	24.6 (76.3)	18.3 (64.9)	10.7 (51.3)	3.6 (38.5)	−1 (30)	11.1 (52.0)
Daily mean °C (°F)	−5.9 (21.4)	−5.4 (22.3)	−0.5 (31.1)	8.4 (47.1)	14.8 (58.6)	18.4 (65.1)	20.9 (69.6)	20 (68)	14.1 (57.4)	7.4 (45.3)	1.4 (34.5)	−2.9 (26.8)	7.6 (45.6)
Mean daily minimum °C (°F)	−8.4 (16.9)	−8.5 (16.7)	−4.6 (23.7)	2.9 (37.2)	9.2 (48.6)	13.1 (55.6)	15.9 (60.6)	14.9 (58.8)	9.9 (49.8)	4.1 (39.4)	−0.9 (30.4)	−5.1 (22.8)	3.5 (38.4)
Average precipitation mm (inches)	50 (2.0)	44 (1.7)	48 (1.9)	50 (2.0)	63 (2.5)	71 (2.8)	77 (3.0)	54 (2.1)	57 (2.2)	57 (2.2)	48 (1.9)	49 (1.9)	668 (26.2)
Source: https://en.climate-data.org/asia/russian-federation/kursk-oblast/нижние-деревеньки-636979/

== Transport ==
Nizhniye Derevenki is located 2 km from the road of regional importance 38K-017 (Kursk – Lgov – Rylsk – border with Ukraine) as part of the European route E38, 0.5 km from the road 38K-042 (38K-017 – Lgov), on the road of intermunicipal significance 38H-373 (38K-017 – Sugrovo – railway station Lgov), 1.5 km from the nearest railway station Lgov I (Lgov-Kiyevsky) (railway lines: Lgov I — Podkosylev, 322 km – Lgov I, Lgov I – Kursk and Navlya – Lgov I).

The rural locality is situated 70 km from Kursk Vostochny Airport, 143 km from Belgorod International Airport and 273 km from Voronezh Peter the Great Airport.
