= Nizhnemakhovo =

Nizhnemakhovo Нижнемахово
- Village
- Interactive map of Nizhnemakhovo
- Location of Nizhnemakhovo Nizhnemakhovo (Russia)
- Coordinates: 51°06′N 35°30′E
- Country: Russia
- Federal subject: Kursk Oblast
- Administrative district: Sudzhansky District
- Selsoviet: Vorobzha

Population (2010 Census)
  - Total: 238
  - Estimate (2010): 238 (0%)
- Time zone: UTC+3 (MSK)
- Postal code: 307826
- OKTMO ID: 38640415106

Nizhnemakhovo (Russian: Нижнемахово) is a village in western Russia, in Sudzhansky District of Kursk Oblast.

== Geography ==
The village is located in the southwest of Kursk Oblast, at about 9.5 kilometres (5.9 mi) from the Russian-Ukrainian border, in the southwestern part of the Central Russian Upland, in the forest steppe zone, on the right bank of the Vorozhba River, at road 38K-028, at a distance of about 14 kilometres (8.7 mi) (in a straight line) southeast of the town of Sudzha, the administrative centre of the district. The absolute height is 147 metres above sea level.

== History ==
=== Russian invasion of Ukraine ===
The settlement came under the control of the Armed Forces of Ukraine in the middle of August 2024 as part of the August 2024 Kursk Oblast incursion of the Russian invasion of Ukraine. By March 2025, it was retaken by Russian forces.
