= Ulanok =

Ulanok Уланок
- Village
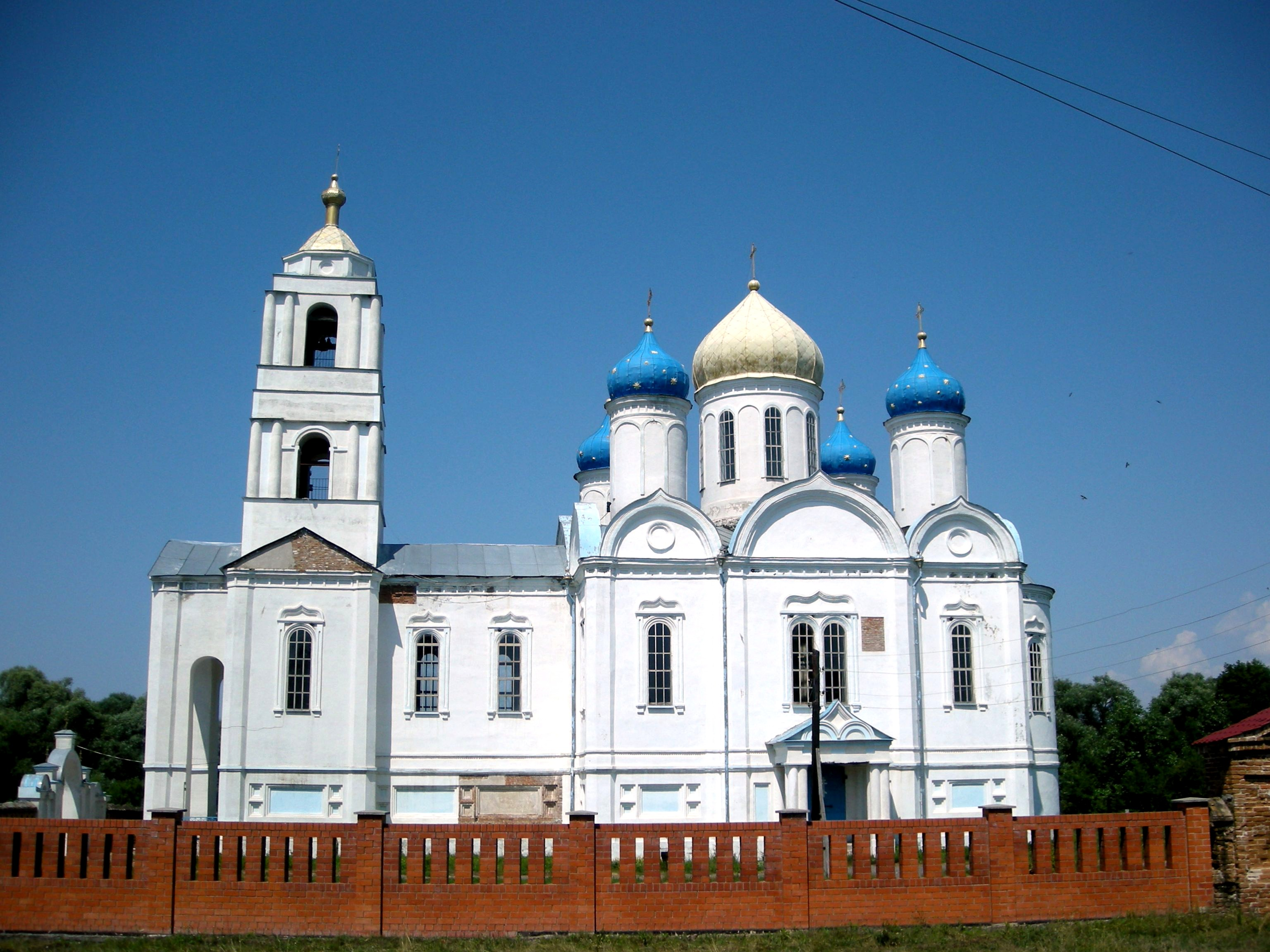
- A church
- Interactive map of Ulanok
- Location of Ulanok Ulanok (Russia)
- Coordinates: 51°08′N 35°24′E
- Country: Russia
- Federal subject: Kursk Oblast
- Administrative district: Sudzhansky District
- Selsoviet: Ulanok
- Founded: 1641

Population (2010 Census)
  - Total: 498
  - Estimate (2021): 498 (0%)
- Time zone: UTC+3 (MSK)
- Postal code: 307822
- OKTMO ID: 38640480101

Ulanok (Russian: Уланок) is a village in western Russia, in Sudzhansky District of Kursk Oblast.

== Geography ==
The village is located in the southwest of the Central Russian Upland. To the south of the village, the river Psyol flows along the river flood plain. There is a peat bog on the southwestern outskirts of the village, behind which the forest begins. To the north and northeast there is a railway crossing the field.

Ulanok is located about 8 kilometres (5.0 mi) from the Russian-Ukrainian border, 87.3 kilometres (54.2 mi) southwest of Kursk, 10.9 kilometres (6.8 mi) southeast of the district centre of Sudzha.

== History ==
=== Russian invasion of Ukraine ===
The settlement came under the control of the Armed Forces of Ukraine in the middle of August 2024 as part of the August 2024 Kursk Oblast incursion of the Russian invasion of Ukraine.
