= Sudzhansky District =

Sudzhansky District Суджанский район (Russian)
- District
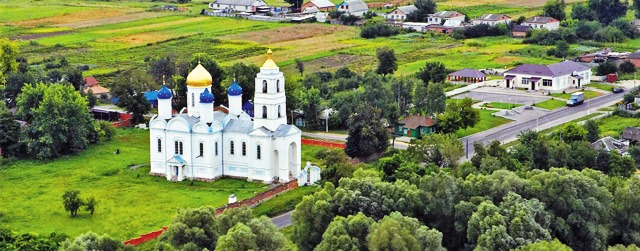
- Church of the Nativity in the village of Ulanok

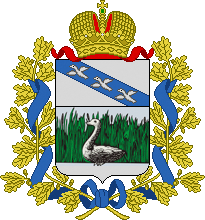
- Coat of arms
- Location of Sudzhansky District in Kursk Oblast
- Coordinates: 51°12′N 35°16′E
- Country: Russia
- Federal subject: Kursk Oblast
- Established: 30 July 1928
- Administrative center: Sudzha

Area
  - Total: 996 km^{2} (385 sq mi)

Population (2010 Census)
  - Total: 26,964
  - Density: 27.1/km^{2} (70.1/sq mi)
  - Urban: 22.4%
  - Rural: 77.6%

Administrative structure
  - Administrative divisions: 1 towns of district significance, 21 selsoviets
  - Inhabited localities: 1 cities/towns, 81 rural localities

Municipal structure
  - Municipally incorporated as: Sudzhansky Municipal District
  - Municipal divisions: 1 urban settlements, 16 rural settlements
- Time zone: UTC+3 (MSK)
- OKTMO ID: 38640000
- Website: http://sudgar.rkursk.ru/

Sudzhansky District (Russian: Суджанский райо́н) is an administrative and municipal district (raion), one of the twenty-eight in Kursk Oblast, Russia. Its administrative center is the town of Sudzha. It has a population of 25,119.

== Geography ==
The area of the district is 996 square kilometers (385 sq mi). It is located in the southwest of the oblast, and borders with Korenevsky District in the west, Lgovsky District in the north, Belovsky District and Bolshesoldatsky District in the east, and Sumy Oblast of Ukraine in the south.

It is located in the southwest part of the Central Russian Upland. The most important rivers that flow through Sudzhansky District are the Psel and the Sudzha. The district has a temperate continental climate.

Aside from the town of Sudzha, the district contains over eighty villages and hamlets, including Sverdlikovo.

== History ==
Sudzhansky District was created on July 30, 1928. It was originally an administrative division of Lgov Okrug of the Central Black Earth Oblast of the Russian SFSR before being transferred to the newly created Kursk Oblast in 1934.

Following the full-scale Russian invasion of Ukraine that began in 2022, Sudzhansky District has repeatedly been a site of attacks on Russian soil due to proximity to the border with Ukraine. In early August 2024 a Ukrainian offensive was launched into the region, advancing rapidly against surprised and ill-prepared defenses and resulting in the town of Sudzha and the surrounding area coming under Ukrainian occupation. By February 2025, Ukraine had lost control of about 60% of the occupied territory.

== Demographics ==
The population of the district has decreased over the past few decades, declining from 34,438 in 1989 to 25,119 in 2021. As of 2021, the population of Sudzha accounts for 20.4% of the district's population.

Population history
| Year | 1989 | 2002 | 2010 | 2021 |
| Pop. | 34,438 | 31,466 | 26,964 | 25,119 |
| ±% p.a. | — | −0.69% | −1.91% | −0.64% |

== Villages ==
In Sudzhansky District there is one city and 81 rural settlements. Some of them include:

- Borki
- Gornal
- Guyevo
- Khitrovka
- Malaya Loknya
- Martynovka
- Nikolayevo-Darino
- Nizhnemakhovo
- Novaya Sorochina
- Novoivanovka
- Oleshnya
- Plyokhovo
- Russkaya Konopelka
- Russkoye Porechnoye
- Spalnoye
- Ulanok

== See also ==
- Sudzhansky Uyezd
