= Kurchatovsky District =

Kurchatovsky District is the name of several administrative and municipal districts in Russia.

== Districts of the federal subjects ==
Location of Kursk Oblast in Russia

- Kurchatovsky District, Kursk Oblast, an administrative and municipal district of Kursk Oblast

== City divisions ==
- Kurchatovsky City District, Chelyabinsk, an administrative and municipal city district of Chelyabinsk, the administrative center of Chelyabinsk Oblast
Location of Chelyabinsk in Russia

== See also ==
- Kurchatov (disambiguation)
