= Eduard Moskaliov =

Ukrainian military officer (born 1973)

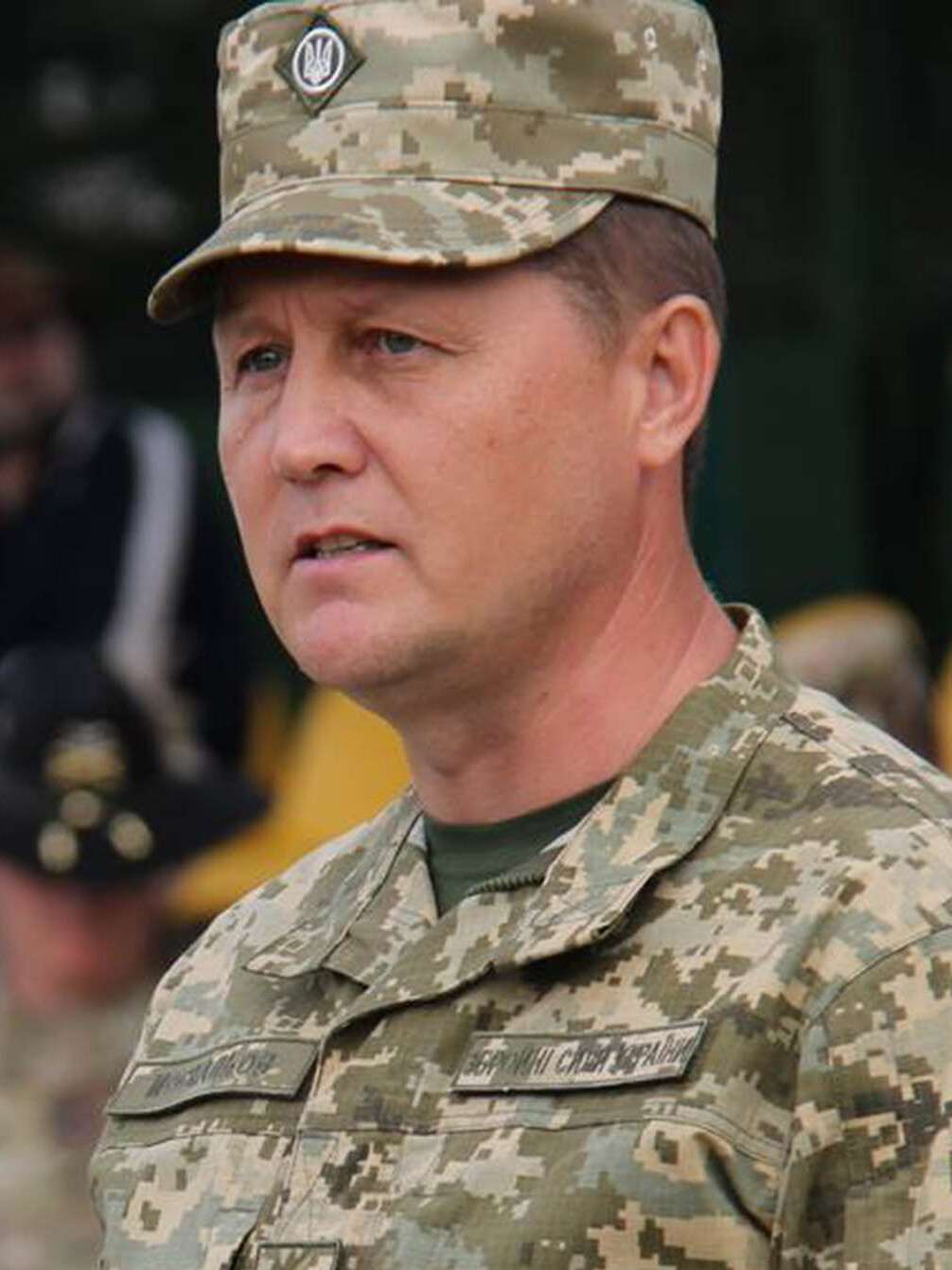
- Moskaliov in 2018
- Born: Eduard Mykhailovych Moskalyov; 22 December 1973 (age 52); Odessa, Ukraine, Soviet Union
- Allegiance: Ukraine
- Branch: Ukrainian Ground Forces
- Service years: 1992–present
- Rank: Heneral-maior (Major General)
- Commands: Operational Command East; Joint forces Operation; Military Occupation of Kursk Oblast
- Conflicts: Russian Invasion of Ukraine: 2024 Kursk offensive
- Awards: Order of Bohdan Khmelnytsky III (Note: 3rd degree (29 September 2014)); Order of Bohdan Khmelnytsky II (Note: 2nd degree (19 March 2022))

Eduard Mykhailovych Moskaliov (Note: Also romanized as Moskalyov) (Ukrainian: Едуард Михайлович Москальов; born 22 December 1973) is a Ukrainian major general of the Ukrainian Ground Forces.

== Career ==
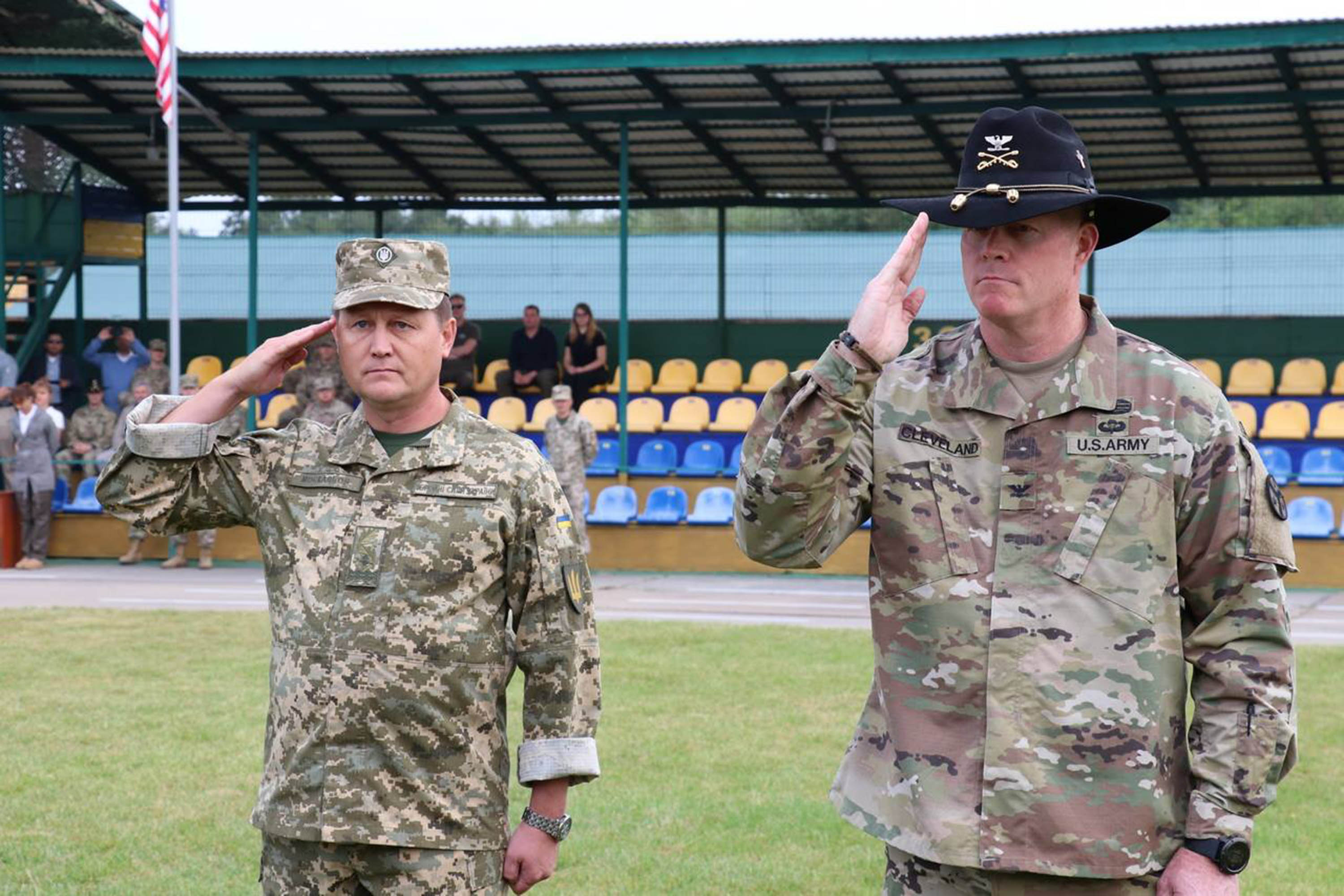
Moskaliov (left) saluting during the 2018 Rapid Trident ceremony

Moskaliov was appointed as the chief of staff - first deputy commander of the Ukrainian Operational Command East in 2019.

Moskaliov was the commanding officer of the Joint Forces Operation from March 2022 until in February 2023, when he was dismissed without a public reason. In March 2023, he was appointed as the commander of the "Odesa" OSU.

In August 2024, Moskaliov was appointed military commandant of the territory in Kursk Oblast occupied by Ukraine during the Kursk offensive.

== Awards ==
He was awarded Order of Bohdan Khmelnytsky 3rd degree on 29 September 2014 for personal courage and heroism, demonstrated in the defense of state sovereignty and territorial integrity of Ukraine and Order of Bohdan Khmelnytsky 2nd degree on 19 March 2022 for personal courage and selfless actions shown in the defense of state sovereignty and territorial integrity of Ukraine and loyalty to the military oath.

== See also ==
- Ukrainian occupation of Kursk Oblast
