= Borki, Sudzhansky District, Kursk Oblast =

Borki Борки
- Village
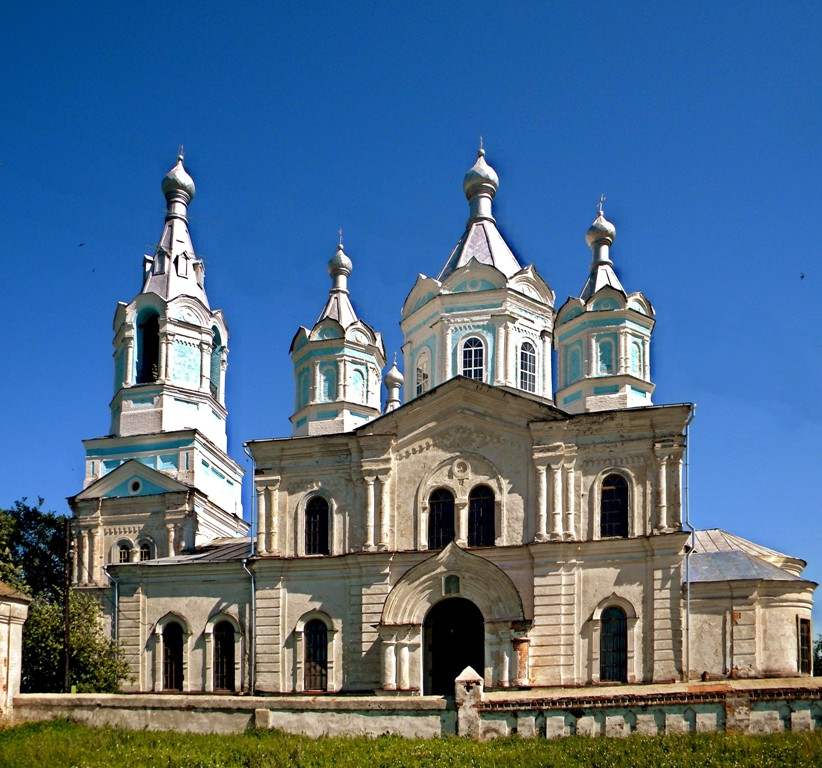
- A church
- Interactive map of Borki
- Location of Borki Borki (Russia)
- Coordinates: 51.104025°N 35.404375°E
- Country: Russia
- Federal subject: Kursk Oblast
- Administrative district: Sudzhansky District
- Selsoviet: Borki

Population (2010 Census)
  - Total: 378
  - Estimate (2010): 378 (0%)
- Time zone: UTC+3 (MSK)
- Postal code: 307824
- OKTMO ID: 38640410101

Borki (Russian: Борки) is a village in western Russia, in Sudzhansky District of Kursk Oblast.

== Geography ==
The village is located on the river Psyol, 4.5 kilometres (2.8 mi) from the Russian-Ukrainian border, 89 kilometres (55 mi) southwest of Kursk, 13.5 kilometres (8.4 mi) southeast of the district centre of Sudzha.

== History ==
=== Russian invasion of Ukraine ===
The settlement came under the control of the Armed Forces of Ukraine in the middle of August 2024 as part of the August 2024 Kursk Oblast incursion of the Russian invasion of Ukraine, but was recaptured by Russian soldiers on August 24, 2024.
