= Kurchatov =

Kurchatov may refer to one of the following.

- Igor Kurchatov, the leader of the Soviet atomic bomb project

Cities named after Igor Kurchatov

- Kurchatov, Kazakhstan
- Kurchatov, Russia

Astronomical objects named after Igor Kurchatov

- Lunar crater Kurchatov (crater)
- Asteroid 2352 Kurchatov

Scientific institutions named after Igor Kurchatov

- Kurchatov Institute
