= Plyokhovo, Kursk Oblast =

Plyokhovo Плёхово
- Location of Plyokhovo
- Coordinates: 51.10°N 35.33°E
- Country: Russia
- Federal subject: Kursk Oblast
- Administrative district: Sudzhansky District

Population
  - Estimate (2020): 627
- Time zone: UTC+3 (MSK)
- Postal code(s): 307823
- OKTMO ID: 38640466101

Plyokhovo (Russian: Плёхово) is a village in western Russia, in Sudzansky District of Kursk Oblast.

== Climate ==
Plyokhovo, like the surrounding region, has a humid continental climate with warm summers and relatively warm winters.

== History ==
In March 2023, videos emerged reportedly showing pro-Ukrainian insurgents in Plyokhovo, where they showed they had allegedly planted landmines in the village and invited Russians to join them, paralleling the recent 2023 Bryansk Oblast attack.

The village was subsequently taken over by the Ukrainian army during their cross-border offensive into Kursk Oblast in August 2024. It was reported that the Russian army used North-Korean soldiers in an attempt to retake Plyokhovo in December 2024. According to the Ukrainian military's intelligence agency a number of them were killed or wounded during the attempt.

== Demographics ==
Historical population
Year	2002	2010	2015	2020
Pop.	843	679	647	627
±%	—	−19.5%	−4.7%	−3.1%

== Features ==
There is a Palace of Culture in the village, and 497 houses.
