= Sudzhansky Uyezd =

Subdivision of Kursk Governorate, Russian Empire

Sudzhansky Uyezd Суджанский уезд
- Uezd
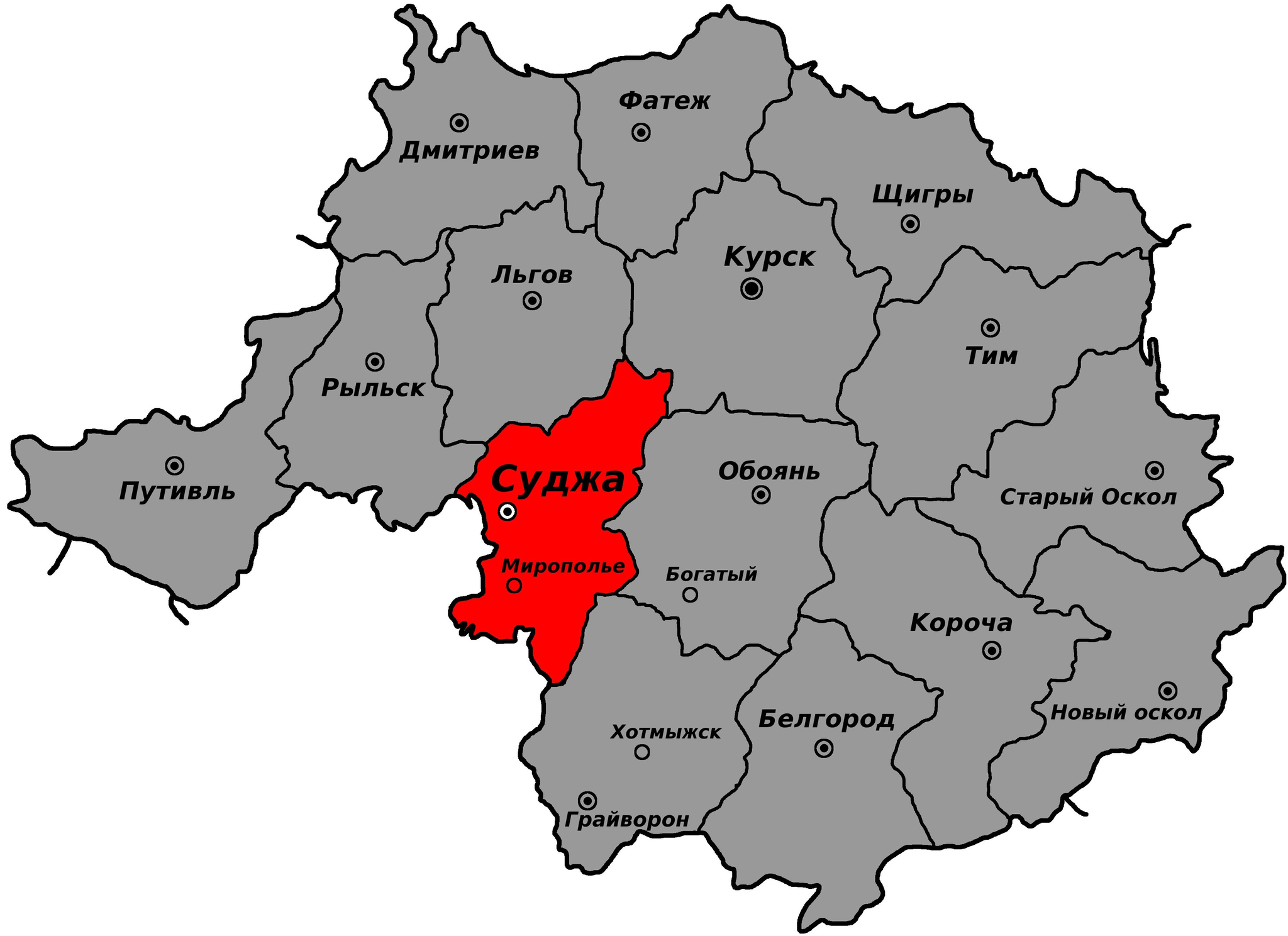
- Location in the Kursk Governorate
- Country: Russian Empire
- Governorate: Kursk
- Capital: Sudzha

Area
  - Total: 2,801.8 km^{2} (1,081.8 sq mi)

Population (1897)
  - Total: 152,191
  - Density: 54.319/km^{2} (140.69/sq mi)
- Today part of: Russia, Ukraine

Sudzhansky Uyezd (Russian: Суджа́нский уе́зд; pre-1918: Суджанскiй уѣздъ) was one of the subdivisions of Kursk Governorate of the Russian Empire. It was situated in the western part of the governorate. Its administrative centre was Sudzha.

== History ==
The city of Sudzha was founded in 1664. The uyezd is known to have existed by some other point in the 17th century.

On October 16, 1925, the Central Executive Committee of the Soviet Union enacted a resolution that transferred part of the former Sudzhansky Uyezd from the Russian SFSR to the Ukrainian SSR.

== Demographics ==
At the time of the Russian Empire Census of 1897, Sudzhansky Uyezd had a population of 152,191 people, of whom 76,119 were men and 76,072 were women. This included an urban population of 23,752. Using the historical all-Russian nation terminology, the census identified 55% of the population as Great Russians (Russians) and 45% of the population as Little Russians (Ukrainians). Of the rural population, 51.9% spoke Russian, 47.9% Ukrainian, 0.1% Yiddish and 0.1% Polish as their native language.
