= Sugrovo =

Rural locality in Kursk Oblast, Russia

Sugrovo Сугрово
- Selo
- Interactive map of Sugrovo
- Location of Sugrovo Sugrovo (Kursk Oblast)
- Coordinates: 51°38′26″N 35°19′17″E
- Country: Russia
- Federal subject: Kursk Oblast
- Administrative district: Lgovsky District
- SelsovietSelsoviet: Bolsheugonsky

Population (2010 Census)
  - Total: 316
  - Estimate (2010): 316 (0%)

Municipal status
  - Municipal district: Lgovsky Municipal District
  - Rural settlement: Bolsheugonsky Selsoviet Rural Settlement
- Time zone: UTC+3 (MSK)
- Postal code: 307743
- Dialing code: +7 47140
- OKTMO ID: 38622410106
- Website: b-ugoni.ru

Sugrovo (Russian: Сугрово) is a rural locality (Russian: село, lit. 'village') in Bolsheugonsky Selsoviet Rural Settlement, Lgovsky District, Kursk Oblast, Russia. Population: 316 (2010 census); 370 (2002 census);

== Geography ==
The village is located on the Seym River, 47 km from the Russia–Ukraine border, 60 km south-west of Kursk, 3 km south-east of the district center – the town Lgov, 6.5 km from the selsoviet center – Bolshiye Ugony.

Climate

Sugrovo has a warm-summer humid continental climate (Dfb in the Köppen climate classification).

Climate data for Sugrovo
Month	Jan	Feb	Mar	Apr	May	Jun	Jul	Aug	Sep	Oct	Nov	Dec	Year
Mean daily maximum °C (°F)	−3.8 (25.2)	−2.8 (27.0)	3.1 (37.6)	13.2 (55.8)	19.4 (66.9)	22.7 (72.9)	25.2 (77.4)	24.6 (76.3)	18.3 (64.9)	10.7 (51.3)	3.6 (38.5)	−0.9 (30.4)	11.1 (52.0)
Daily mean °C (°F)	−5.9 (21.4)	−5.4 (22.3)	−0.5 (31.1)	8.4 (47.1)	14.8 (58.6)	18.4 (65.1)	20.9 (69.6)	20 (68)	14.1 (57.4)	7.4 (45.3)	1.4 (34.5)	−2.9 (26.8)	7.6 (45.6)
Mean daily minimum °C (°F)	−8.4 (16.9)	−8.5 (16.7)	−4.7 (23.5)	2.9 (37.2)	9.1 (48.4)	13 (55)	15.8 (60.4)	14.8 (58.6)	9.8 (49.6)	4 (39)	−0.9 (30.4)	−5.1 (22.8)	3.5 (38.2)
Average precipitation mm (inches)	50 (2.0)	44 (1.7)	48 (1.9)	50 (2.0)	63 (2.5)	71 (2.8)	77 (3.0)	54 (2.1)	57 (2.2)	57 (2.2)	48 (1.9)	49 (1.9)	668 (26.2)
Source: https://en.climate-data.org/asia/russian-federation/kursk-oblast/сугрово-319328/

== Transport ==
Sugrovo is located on the road of regional importance 38K-017 (Kursk – Lgov – Rylsk – border with Ukraine) as part of the European route E38, 3 km from the road 38K-024 (Lgov – Sudzha), on the road of intermunicipal significance 38H-373 (38K-017 – Sugrovo – railway station Lgov), in the vicinity of the railway halt 401 km (railway line Lgov I — Kursk).

The rural locality is situated 61 km from Kursk Vostochny Airport, 139 km from Belgorod International Airport and 270 km from Voronezh Peter the Great Airport.
