= Bolshoye Soldatskoye =

Rural locality in Kursk Oblast, Russia

Bolshoye Soldatskoye Большое Солдатское
- Village
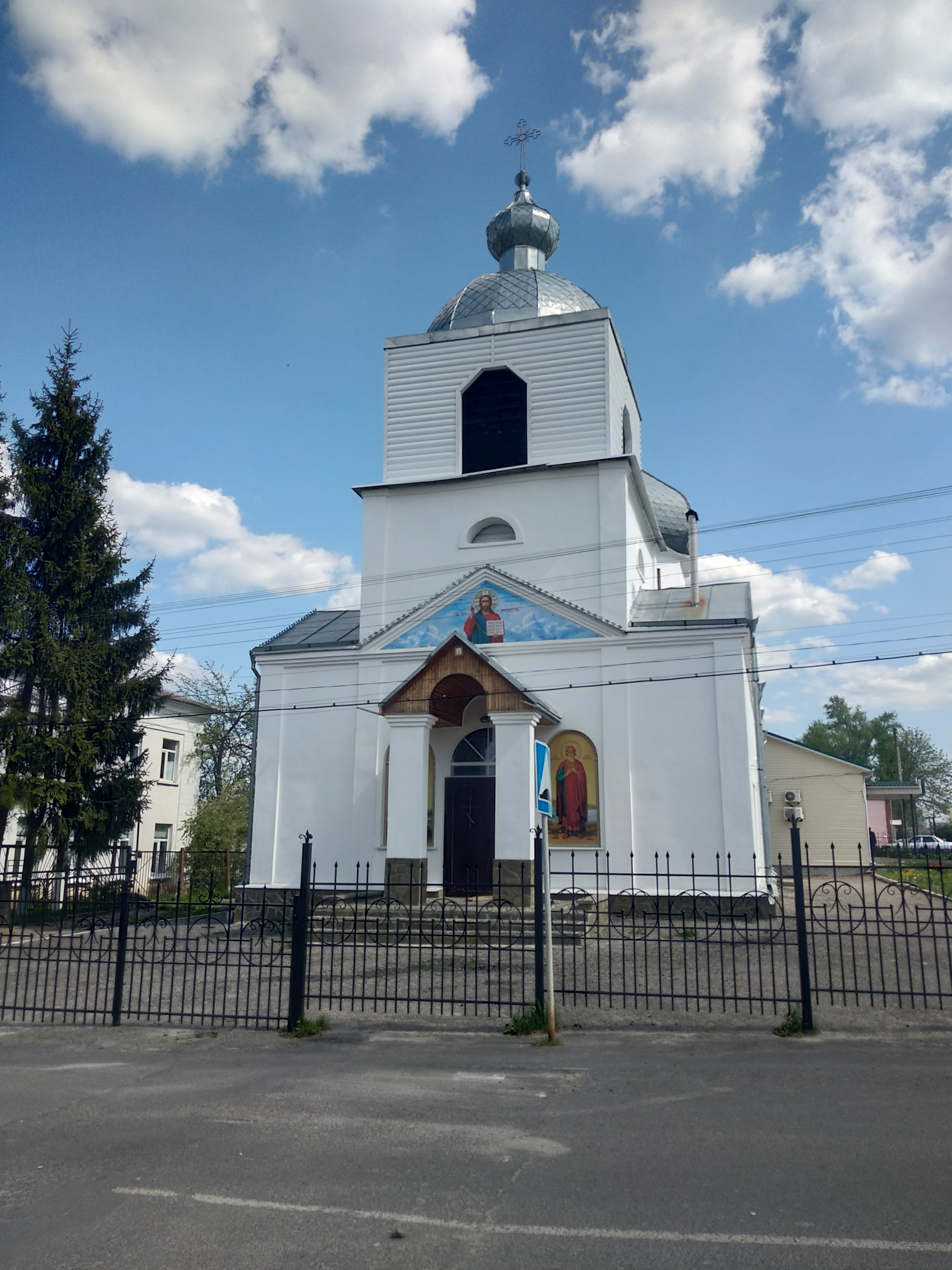
- Interactive map of Bolshoye Soldatskoye
- Location of Bolshoye Soldatskoye Bolshoye Soldatskoye (European Russia)
- Coordinates: 51°19′57″N 35°31′10″E
- Country: Russia
- Federal subject: Kursk Oblast
- Administrative district: Bolshesoldatsky District
- Selsoviet: Bolshoye Soldatskoye

Population (2010 Census)
  - Total: 2,681
  - Estimate (2010): 2,681 (0%)
- Time zone: UTC+3 (MSK)
- Postal code: 307850
- OKTMO ID: 38603403101

Bolshoye Soldatskoye (Russian: Большое Солдатское, lit. 'Big Soldier's') is a rural locality (a selo) and the administrative center of Bolshesoldatsky District, Kursk Oblast, Russia. The population over time is: 2,681 (2010 census); 2,708 (2002 census); 3,194 (1989 Soviet census).

== Climate ==
Bolshoye Soldatskoye has a warm-summer humid continental climate (Dfb in the Köppen climate classification).

Climate data for Bolshoye Soldatskoye
Month	Jan	Feb	Mar	Apr	May	Jun	Jul	Aug	Sep	Oct	Nov	Dec	Year
Mean daily maximum °C (°F)	−3.7 (25.3)	−2.6 (27.3)	3.4 (38.1)	13.3 (55.9)	19.6 (67.3)	22.9 (73.2)	25.4 (77.7)	24.8 (76.6)	18.4 (65.1)	10.8 (51.4)	3.7 (38.7)	−0.8 (30.6)	11.3 (52.3)
Daily mean °C (°F)	−5.8 (21.6)	−5.2 (22.6)	−0.3 (31.5)	8.5 (47.3)	14.9 (58.8)	18.5 (65.3)	21 (70)	20.2 (68.4)	14.2 (57.6)	7.5 (45.5)	1.5 (34.7)	−2.8 (27.0)	7.7 (45.9)
Mean daily minimum °C (°F)	−8.2 (17.2)	−8.4 (16.9)	−4.4 (24.1)	2.9 (37.2)	9.2 (48.6)	13.2 (55.8)	15.9 (60.6)	15 (59)	9.9 (49.8)	4.1 (39.4)	−0.8 (30.6)	−5 (23)	3.6 (38.5)
Average precipitation mm (inches)	51 (2.0)	43 (1.7)	48 (1.9)	49 (1.9)	62 (2.4)	67 (2.6)	71 (2.8)	51 (2.0)	55 (2.2)	55 (2.2)	46 (1.8)	49 (1.9)	647 (25.4)
Source: https://en.climate-data.org/азия/россииская-федерация/курская-область/болшое-солдатское-229479/

== Image(s) ==
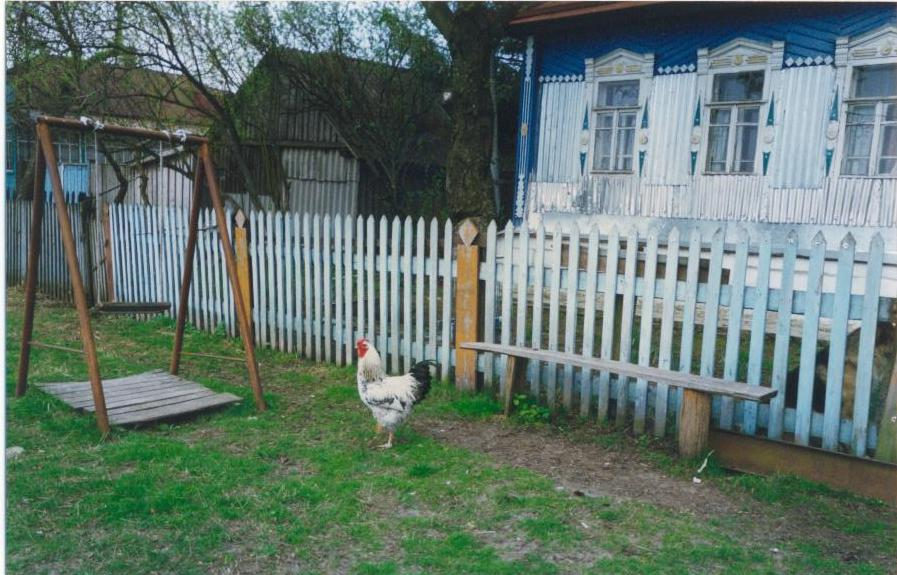
Pochtovaya Street in Bolshoye Soldatskoye, April 1998

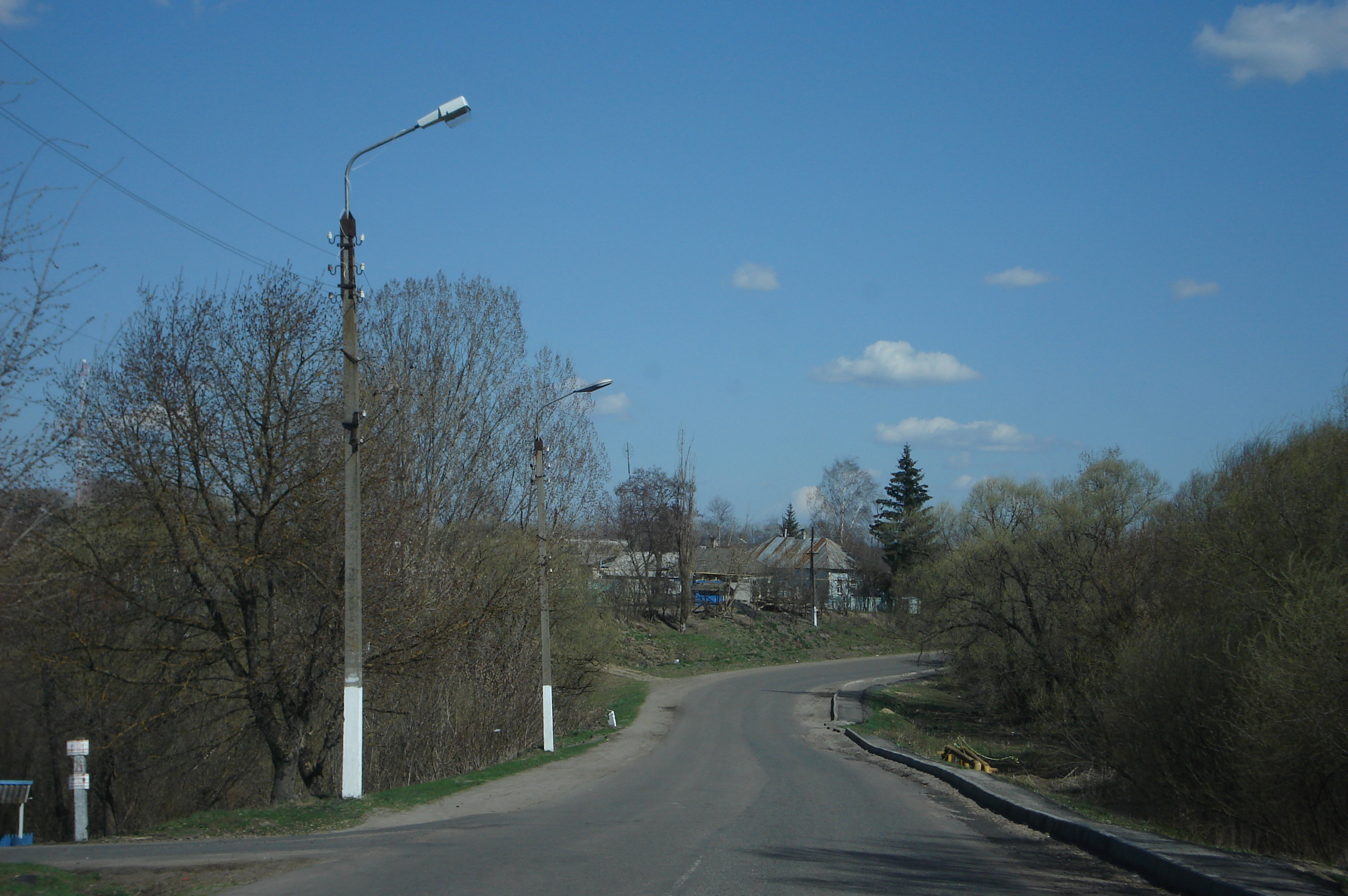
Entrance to Bolshoye Soldatskoye, April 2009

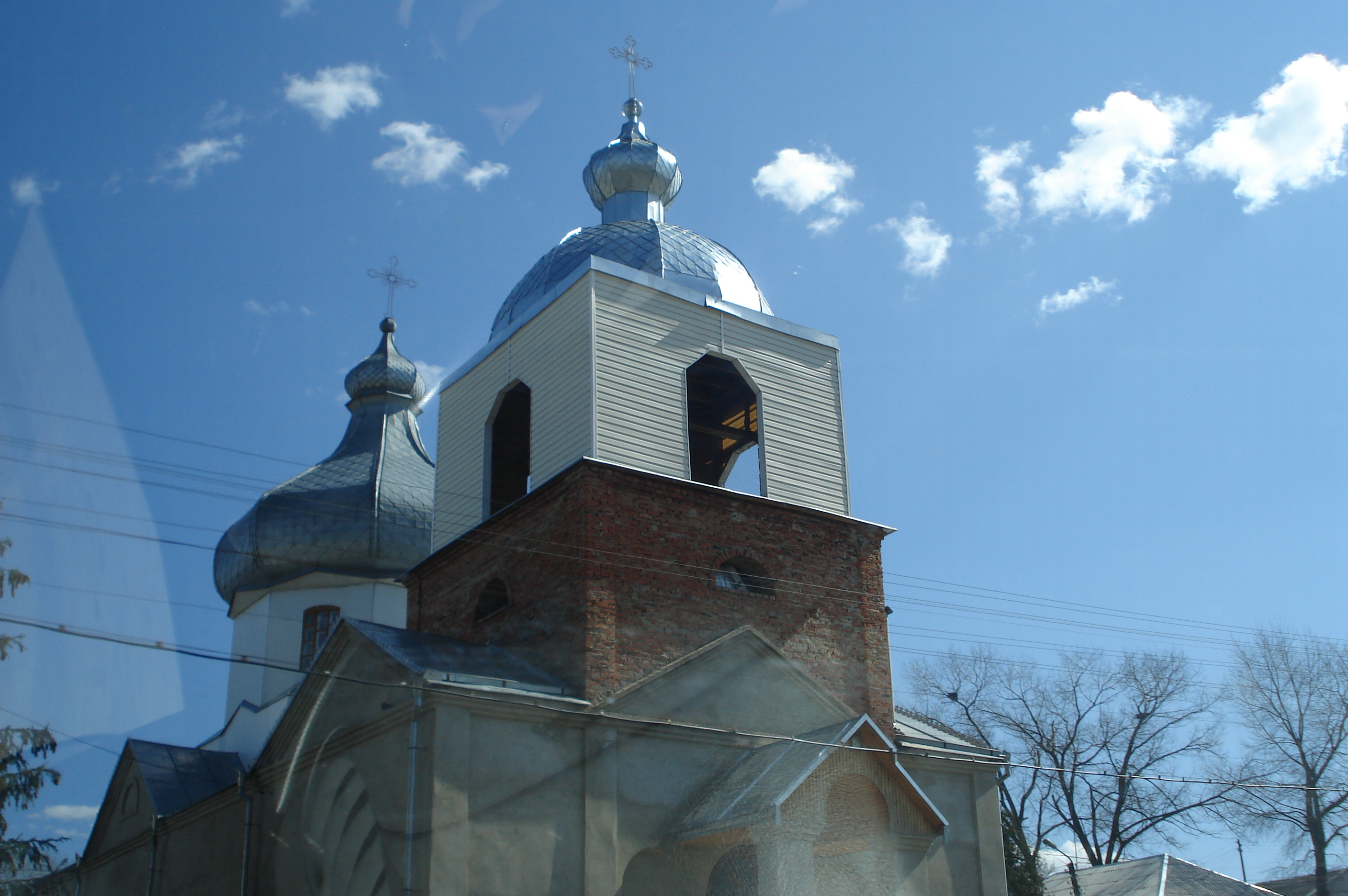
Church in Bolshoye Soldatskoe, April 2009
