= Belovsky District, Kursk Oblast =

Belovsky District Беловский район (Russian)
- District
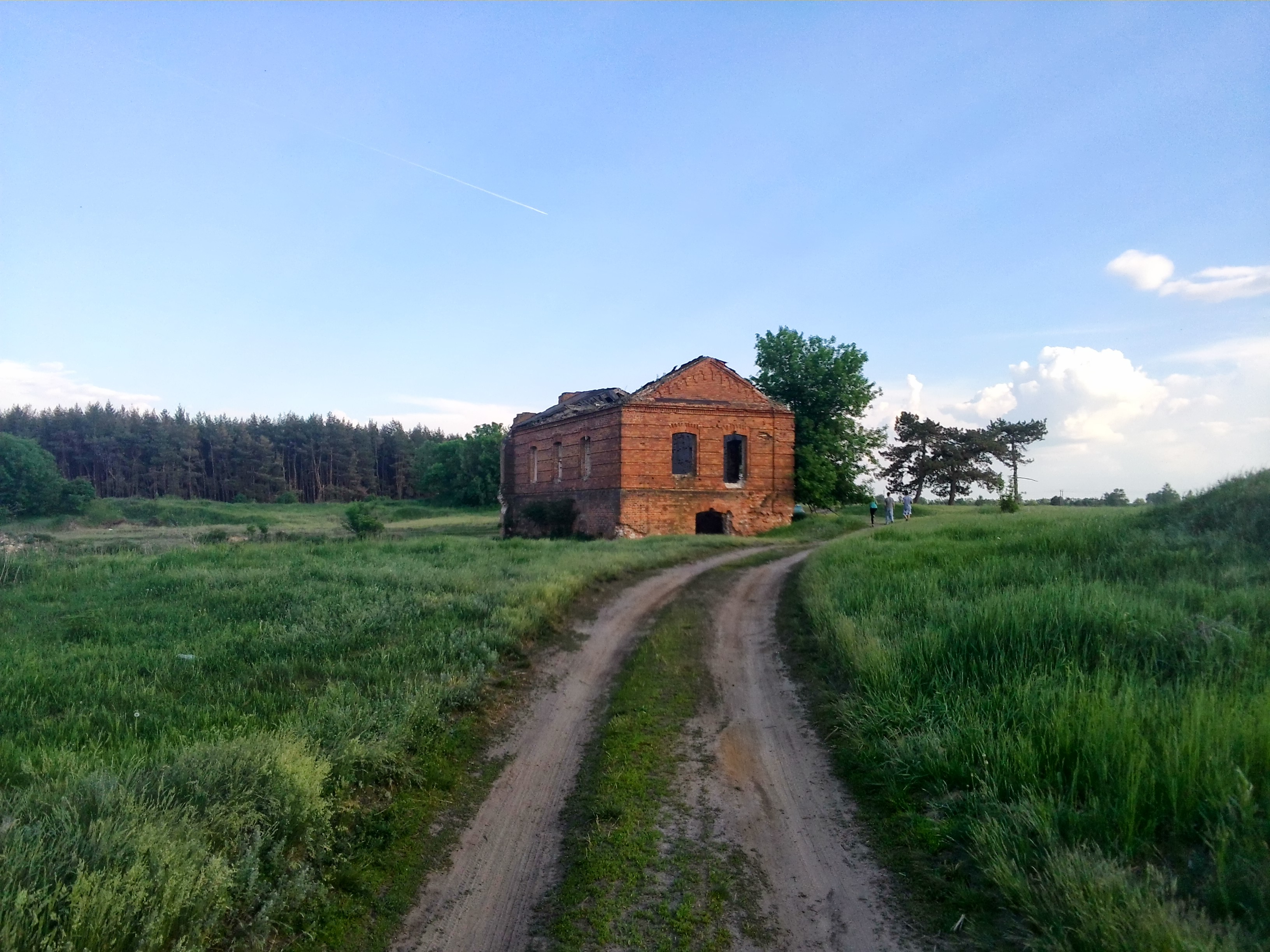
- Water mill in Krupets, Belovsky District

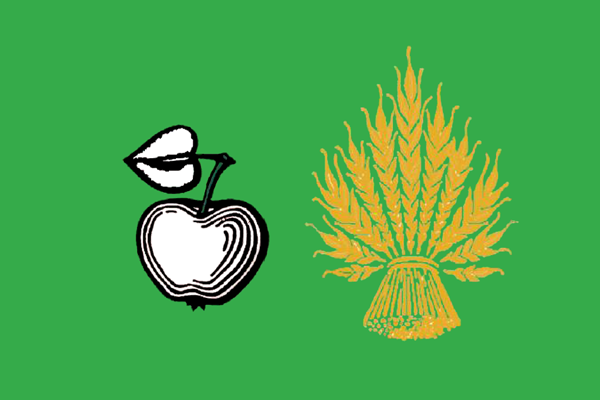
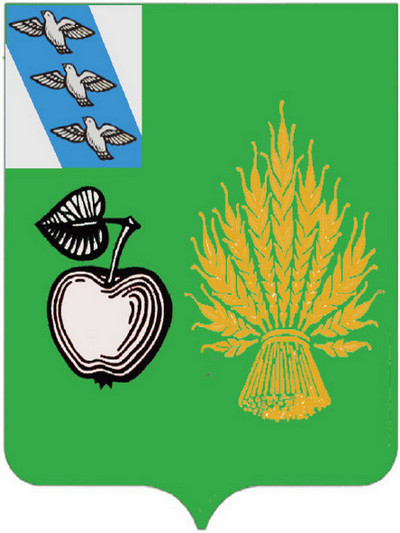
- Flag Coat of arms
- Location of Belovsky District in Kursk Oblast
- Coordinates: 51°03′16″N 35°42′35″E
- Country: Russia
- Federal subject: Kursk Oblast
- Established: 1928
- Administrative center: Belaya

Area
  - Total: 950 km^{2} (370 sq mi)

Population (2010 Census)
  - Total: 17,933
  - Density: 19/km^{2} (49/sq mi)
  - Urban: 0%
  - Rural: 100%

Administrative structure
  - Administrative divisions: 18 selsoviet
  - Inhabited localities: 51 rural localities

Municipal structure
  - Municipally incorporated as: Belovsky Municipal District
  - Municipal divisions: 0 urban settlements, 14 rural settlements
- Time zone: UTC+3 (MSK)
- OKTMO ID: 38602000
- Website: http://bel.rkursk.ru/

Belovsky District (Russian: Бело́вский райо́н) is an administrative and municipal district (raion), one of the twenty-eight in Kursk Oblast, Russia. It is located in the south of the oblast. The area of the district is 950 square kilometers (370 sq mi). Its administrative center is the rural locality (a sloboda) of Belaya. Population: 14,659 (2021 census); 17,933 (2010 census); 22,182 (2002 Census); 25,968 (1989 Soviet census). The population of Belaya accounts for 14.5% of the district's total population.

== History ==
On 11 August 2024, Russian authorities ordered the evacuation of civilians in Belovsky District as a result of a major Ukrainian incursion during the Russo-Ukrainian War. Later on the night of August 11, the Ukrainian Armed Forces entered the Belovsky District, as confirmed by the head of the district head and acting governor. The head of the district recommended that those who had already evacuated not return.

== Geography ==
Belovsky District, Kursk Oblast
- Interactive map of Belovsky District, Kursk Oblast

Belovsky District is located on the south-central edge of Kursk Oblast, on the border with Belgorod Oblast to the south. The terrain is a hilly plain averaging 200 meters (660 ft) above sea level; the district lies on the Orel-Kursk plateau of the Central Russian Upland. The main river in the district is the Psel River, which flows southwest from the district into Ukraine, where it empties into the Dnieper River. The Psel is typically frozen from December to early March. Belovsky District is 60 km (37 mi) south of the city of Kursk, and 520 km (320 mi) south of Moscow. The area measures 40 km (25 mi; north-south), and 38 km (24 mi; west-east); total area is 950 km2 (about 3.2% of Kursk Oblast). The administrative center is the town of Belaya.

The district is bordered on the north by Bolshesoldatsky District, on the east by Oboyansky District, on the south by Krasnoyaruzhsky District, Rakityansky District, and Ivnyansky District of Belgorod Oblast, and on the west by Sudzhansky District.
