= Bolshesoldatsky District =

Bolshesoldatsky District Большесолдатский район (Russian)
- District
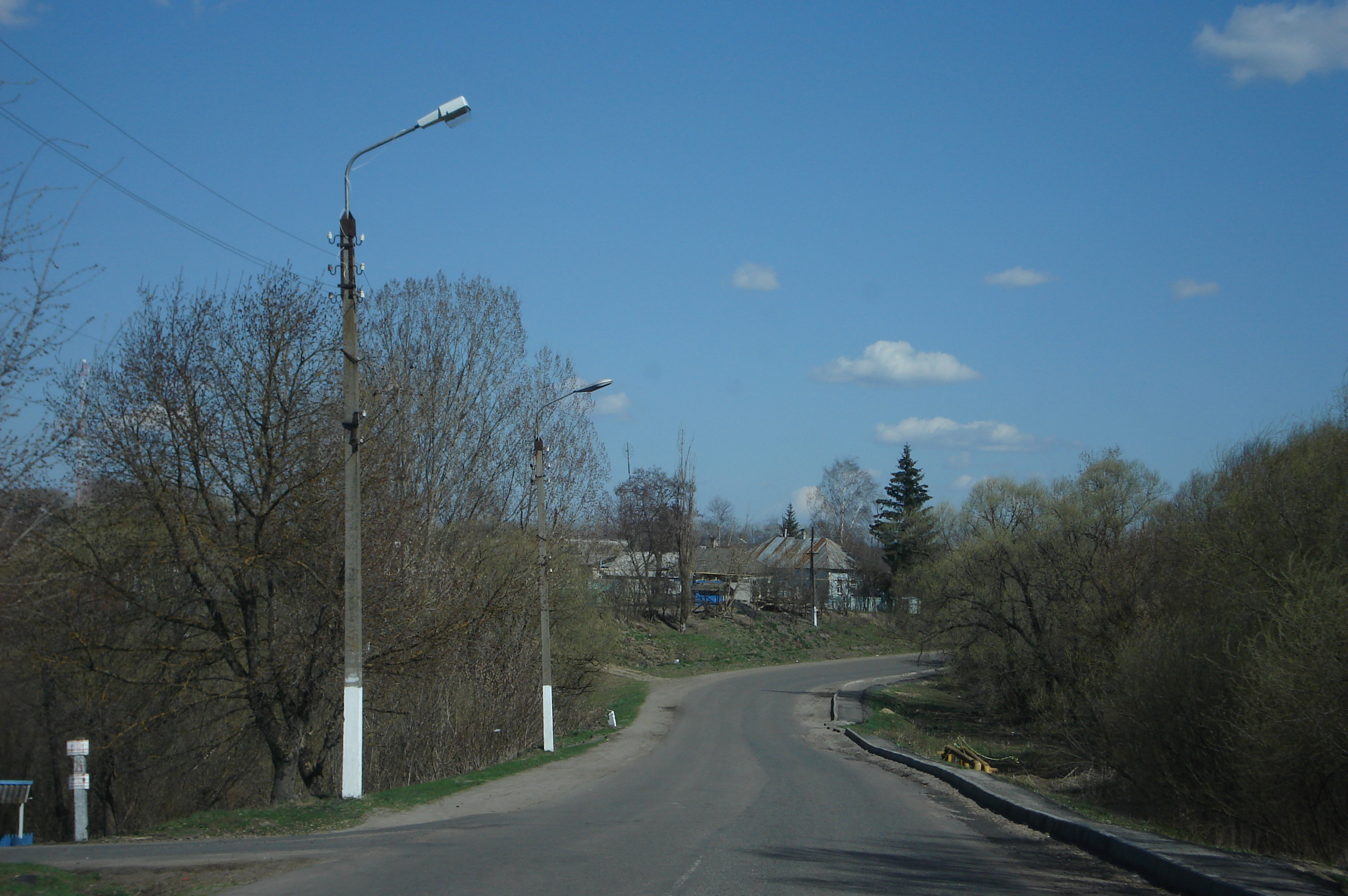
- Bolshe Soldatsky

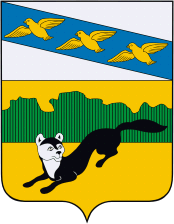
- Coat of arms
- Location of Bolshesoldatsky District in Kursk Oblast
- Coordinates: 51°21′00″N 35°30′37″E
- Country: Russia
- Federal subject: Kursk Oblast
- Established: 14 May 1928
- Administrative center: Bolshoye Soldatskoye

Area
  - Total: 800 km^{2} (310 sq mi)

Population (2010 Census)
  - Total: 12,678
  - Density: 16/km^{2} (41/sq mi)
  - Urban: 0%
  - Rural: 100%

Administrative structure
  - Administrative divisions: 12 selsoviet
  - Inhabited localities: 64 rural localities

Municipal structure
  - Municipally incorporated as: Bolshesoldatsky Municipal District
  - Municipal divisions: 0 urban settlements, 7 rural settlements
- Time zone: UTC+3 (MSK)
- OKTMO ID: 38603000
- Website: http://bol.rkursk.ru/

Bolshesoldatsky District (Russian: Большесолда́тский райо́н) is an administrative and municipal district (raion), one of the twenty-eight in Kursk Oblast, Russia. It is located in the south of the oblast. The area of the district is 800 square kilometers (310 sq mi). Its administrative center is the rural locality (a selo) of Bolshoye Soldatskoye. Population: 10,599 (2021 census); 12,678 (2010 census); 14,636 (2002 Census); 18,528 (1989 Soviet census). The population of Bolshoye Soldatskoye accounts for 21.1% of the district's total population.

== Geography ==
Bolshesoldatsky District is located in the south-central region of Kursk Oblast. The terrain is hilly plain averaging 200 meters (660 ft) above sea level; the district lies on the Orel-Kursk plateau of the Central Russian Upland. The main river in the district is the Sudzha River, which flows from east to west through the district into the Psel River, a tributary of the Dnieper River to the west. The Sudzha River is typically frozen from December to March. The district is 35 km (22 mi) southwest of the city of Kursk, and 490 km (300 mi) southwest of Moscow. The area measures 40 km (25 mi; north-south), and 30 km (19 mi; west-east). The administrative center is the town of Bolshoye Soldatskoye.

The district is bordered on the north by Kurchatovsky District, on the east by Medvensky District, on the south by Belovsky District, and on the west by Sudzhansky District.
