= Belaya, Kursk Oblast =

Belaya Белая
- Sloboda
- Interactive map of Belaya
- Location of Belaya Belaya (Russia)
- Coordinates: 51°03′20″N 35°42′37″E
- Country: Russia
- Federal subject: Kursk Oblast
- Administrative district: Belovsky District
- SelsovietSelsoviet: Belovsky
- Founded: 1664
- Elevation: 152 m (499 ft)

Population (2010 Census)
  - Total: 2,598
  - Estimate (2010): 2,598 (0%)

Administrative status
  - Capital of: Belovsky District, Belovsky Selsoviet

Municipal status
  - Municipal district: Belovsky Municipal District
  - Rural settlement: Belovsky Selsoviet Rural Settlement
  - Capital of: Belovsky Municipal District, Belovsky Selsoviet Rural Settlement
- Time zone: UTC+3 (MSK)
- Postal code: 307910
- OKTMO ID: 38602408101

Belaya (Russian: Белая) is a rural locality (a sloboda) and the administrative center of Belovsky District of Kursk Oblast, Russia. Population: 2,598 (2010 census); 2,875 (2002 census); 3,278 (1989 Soviet census).
