= Sudzha (river) =

River in Russia

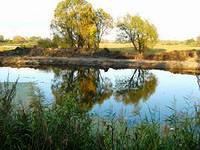
- Sudzha River in the summer of 1996
- Native name: Суджа (Russian)

Location
- Country: Russia
- Oblast: Kursk Oblast

Physical characteristics
- Source
  - coordinates: 51°16′49″N 35°42′26″E
  - elevation: > 151 m
- Mouth: Psel
  - coordinates: 51°07′51″N 35°16′47″E
  - elevation: < 135 m
- Length: 63 km (39 mi)
- Basin size: 1,102 km^{2} (425 sq mi)

Basin features
- River system: Psel → Dnieper → Black Sea

The Sudzha (Russian: Суджа) is a river in Russia, a right tributary of the Psel, which flows through the Bolshesoldatsky and Sudzhansky districts (raions) of Kursk Oblast. It is 63 kilometres (39 mi) long, and the basin area is 1,102 square kilometres (425 sq mi). The river flows for a considerable distance through wetlands with a large number of oxbow lakes.

Its tributaries include: Skorodnaya – 22 km, Vorobzha – 28 km, Ivnitsa – 23 km, Loknya – 26 km, Malaya Loknya – 24 km, Smerditsa – 17 km, Rzhava – 9 km, Oleshnya – 12 km, and Konopelka – 16 km.

The biggest settlement on the river is the identically-named town of Sudzha.

== History ==
The Sudzha River is mentioned in descriptions of Polish roads of 1584–1598 and in chronicles of the 16th century.

Archaeological data indicates that in the 7th century, hoards of items were deposited in this area, which are part of the Dnieper group of early medieval hoards, or the "antiquities of the Antae". It is possible that in the 7th century, one of the centers of power of the Dnieper tribal union was located on the Lower Sudzha. From the 8th century, Slavs of the tribal union of the Severians inhabited these lands, having fortified towns near the present-day village of Gornal and several settlements across the modern Sudzhansky District. Settlements of the Cumans, who were allied with the Russian princes, were also located in this area.

== Hydronym ==
Presumably the name Sudzha comes from the Turkic words "su" — water and "ja" — place; that is, a watery place.

The name is also compared with the ancient Indian śudhyati "to become pure" and śuddhá "pure".
