= Malaya Loknya =

Malaya Loknya Малая Локня
- Village
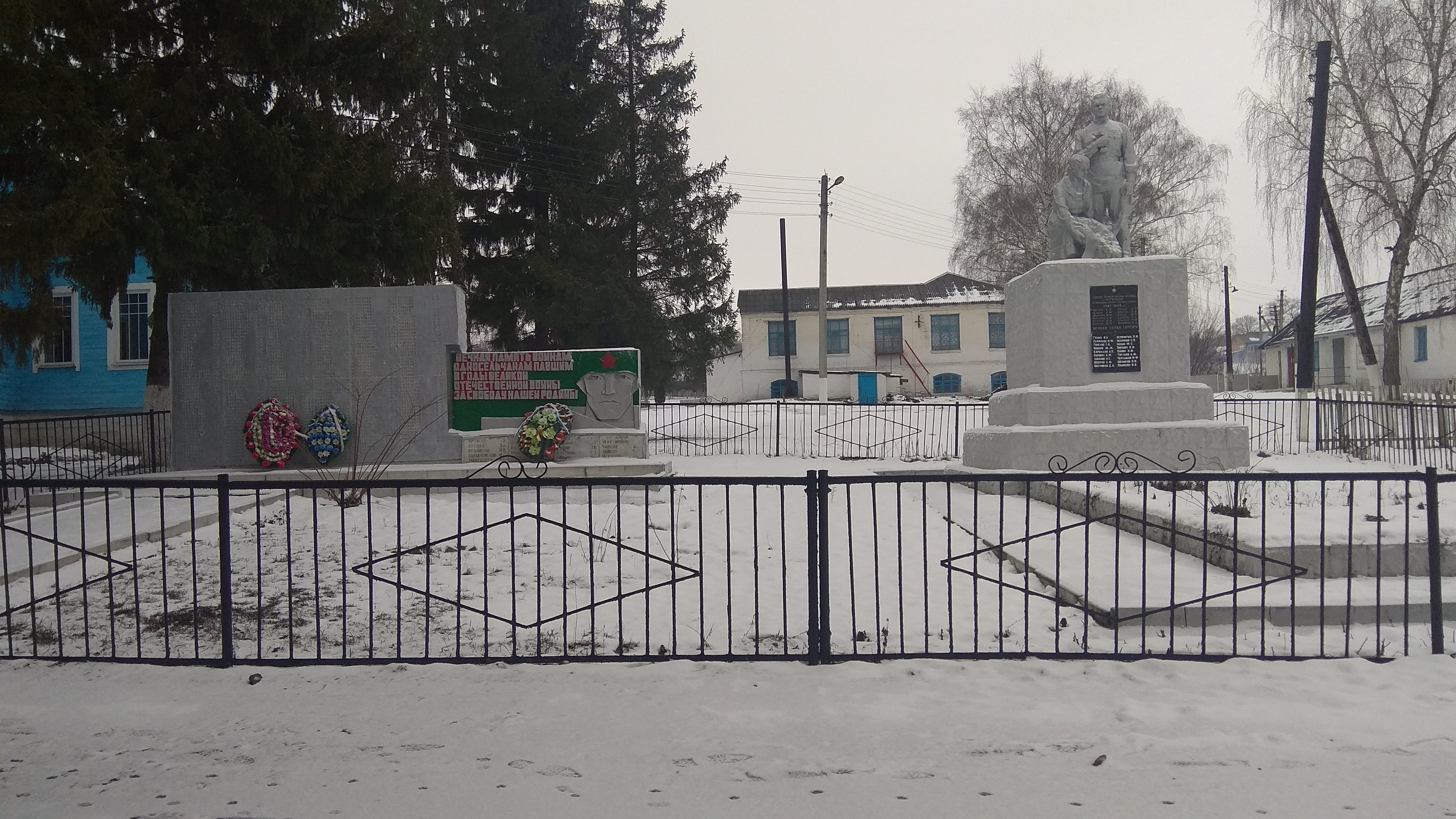
- Soviet Mass Grave in Malaya Loknya
- Interactive map of Malaya Loknya
- Location of Malaya Loknya Malaya Loknya (Russia)
- Coordinates: 51.3325°N 35.2275°E
- Country: Russia
- Federal subject: Kursk Oblast
- Administrative district: Sudzhansky District
- Selsoviet: Maloloknyansky

Population (2010 Census)
  - Total: 799
  - Estimate (2010): 799 (0%)
- Time zone: UTC+3 (MSK)
- Postal code: 307835
- OKTMO ID: 38640450101

Malaya Loknya (Russian: Малая Локня) is a rural locality (a selo) in Sudzhansky District, Kursk Oblast, Russia. It is the administrative center of the Maloloknyansky Selsoviet.

== Geography ==
The village is located on the left bank of the Malaya Loknya River (a left tributary of the Loknya in the Psel basin), directly across from smaller villages of Nikolayevka, Viktorovka, and Staraya Sorochina. Malaya Loknya is located 13.5 km from the Russia–Ukraine border.

The names of the streets in the village are Zelenaya, Kubareva, Molodezhnaya, Pugacheva T.D., Sotnitskaya, and Stantsionnaya.

== History ==
On 8 August 2024, Malaya Loknya was mostly captured by Ukrainian forces as part of the August 2024 Kursk Oblast incursion. Russian forces continued to hold out in the area surrounding the locality's women's prison before managing to retreat from the village around 25 August 2024 despite encirclement.

Russian forces recaptured the village by 9 March 2025.
