= Guyevo =

Guyevo Гуево
- Village
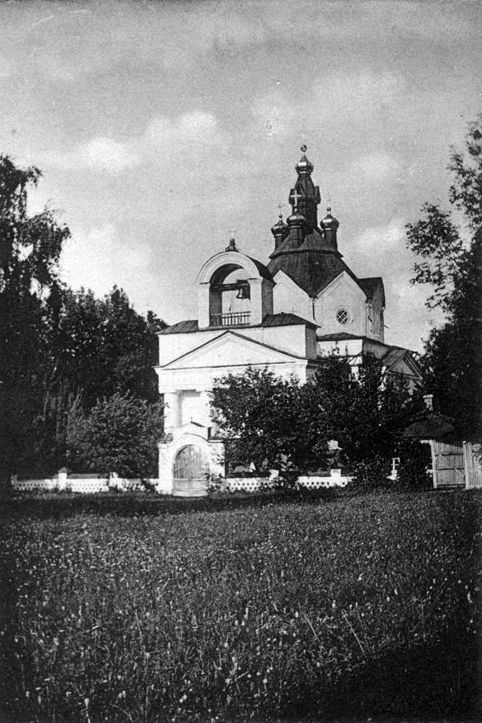
- Church of the Nativity of the Virgin Mary in 1907
- Interactive map of Guyevo
- Location of Guyevo Guyevo (Russia)
- Coordinates: 51.09472°N 35.26389°E
- Country: Russia
- Federal subject: Kursk Oblast
- Administrative district: Sudzhansky District
- Selsoviet: Guyevo

Population (2010 Census)
  - Total: 904
  - Estimate (2010): 904 (0%)
- Time zone: UTC+3 (MSK)
- Postal code: 307815
- OKTMO ID: 38640424101

Guyevo (Russian: Гуево) is a village in Sudzhansky District, Kursk Oblast, Russia.

== Geography ==
The village is situated on the river Psel and its tributary Guiva, 3.5 kilometres (2.2 mi) from the Russia–Ukraine border, 96 kilometres (60 mi) southwest of Kursk, 10.5 kilometres (6.5 mi) south of the district centre of Sudzha.

== History ==
=== Russian invasion of Ukraine ===
Ukrainian military forces took control of the settlement in the 2024 Kursk offensive during the Russo-Ukrainian War. Russia recaptured the settlement on 7 April 2025.
