= Gornal, Russia =

Gornal Горналь
- Village
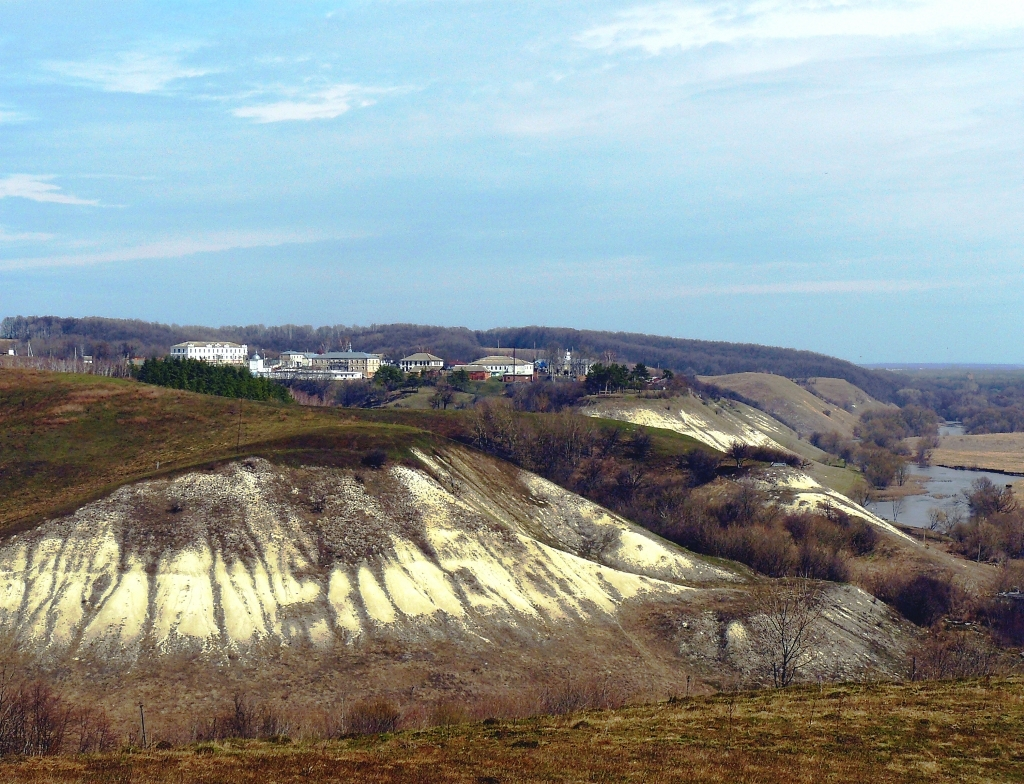
- Gornalsky Nikol'skiy Belogorskiy Monastyr'
- Interactive map of Gornal
- Location of Gornal Gornal (European Russia) Gornal (Russia)
- Coordinates: 51.057°N 35.211°E
- Country: Russia
- Federal subject: Kursk Oblast
- Administrative district: Sudzhansky District

Population (2010 Census)
  - Total: 152
  - Estimate (2021 census): 100 (−34.2%)
- Time zone: UTC+3 (MSK)
- Postal code: 307816
- OKTMO ID: 38640424106

Gornal (Russian: Горналь) is a village in western Russia, in Sudzansky District of Kursk Oblast.

The village is located on the river Psel, not far from the Russian-Ukrainian border, 102 kilometres (63 mi) southwest of Kursk, 15 kilometres (9.3 mi) south of the district centre of Sudzha.
