= Sudzha =

Town in Kursk Oblast, Russia

Sudzha Суджа
- Town
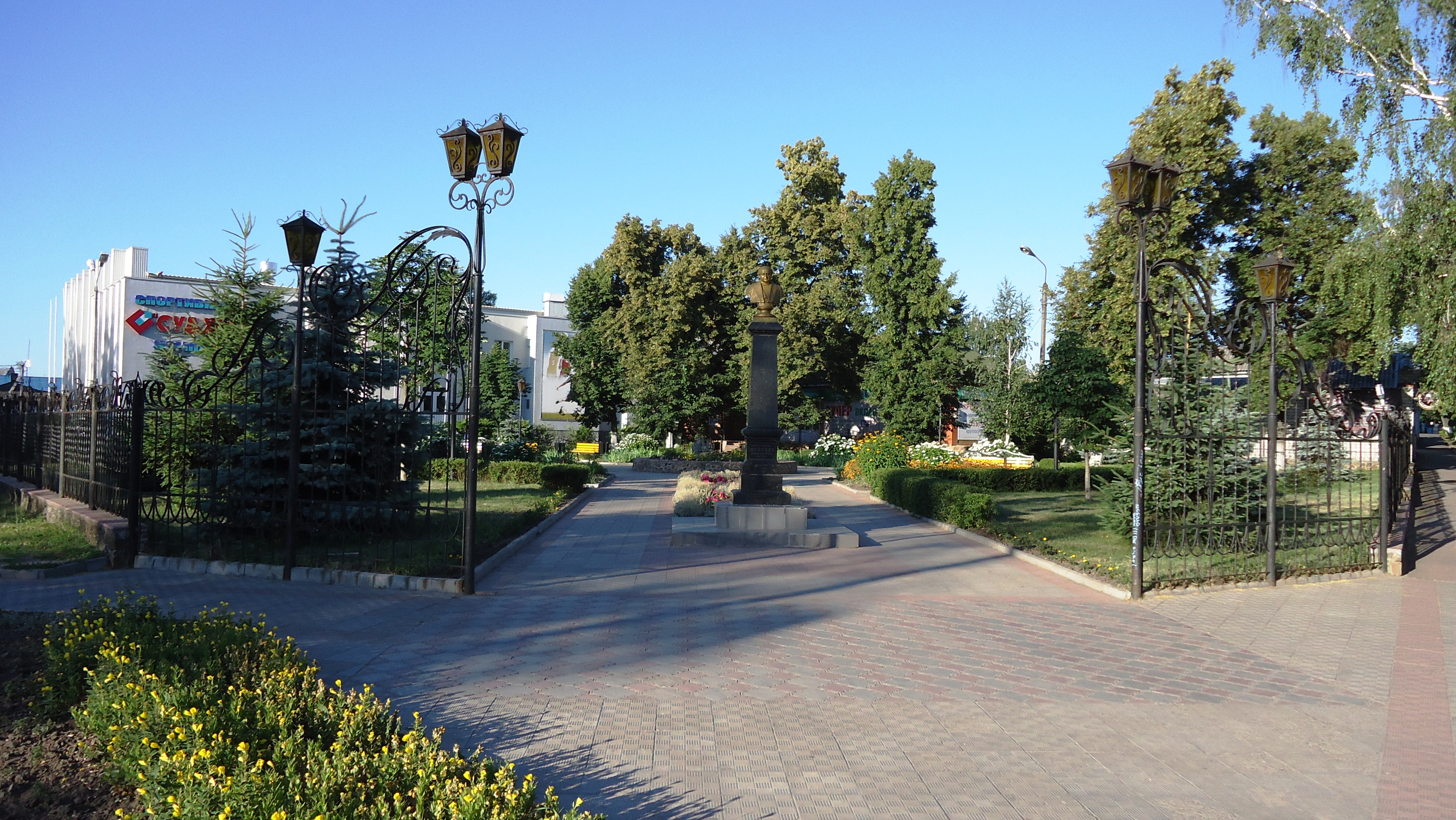
- Public park in Sudzha

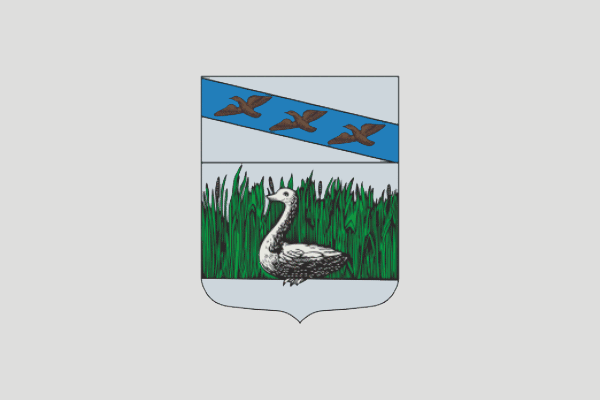
- Flag Coat of arms
- Interactive map of Sudzha
- Location of Sudzha Sudzha (European Russia) Sudzha (Russia)
- Coordinates: 51°11′29″N 35°16′14″E
- Country: Russia
- Federal subject: Kursk Oblast
- Administrative district: Sudzhansky District
- Selsoviet: Sudzha
- Founded: 1661

Government
  - Mayor: Vitaliy Slashev

Area
  - Total: 4.34 km^{2} (1.68 sq mi)
- Elevation: 135 m (443 ft)

Population (2010 Census)
  - Total: 6,036
  - Estimate (1 January 2024): 4,941 (−18.1%)
  - Density: 1,390/km^{2} (3,600/sq mi)

Administrative status
  - Capital of: Sudzhansky District

Municipal status
  - Municipal district: Sudzhansky Municipal District
  - Urban settlement: Sudzha Urban Settlement
  - Capital of: Sudzhansky Municipal District, Sudzha Urban Settlement
- Time zone: UTC+3 (MSK)
- Postal codes: 307800, 307801, 307839
- OKTMO ID: 38640101001
- Website: город-суджа.рф

Sudzha (Russian: Суджа, [ˈsudʐə]) is a town and the administrative center of Sudzhansky District in Kursk Oblast, Russia, located on the Sudzha and Oleshnya rivers 105 kilometers (65 mi) southwest of Kursk, the administrative center of the oblast. As of the 2021 census, it has a population of 5,127 people.

It is the natural gas exchange feeder where the Trans-Siberian pipeline meets the Brotherhood pipeline.

The town was briefly occupied by Ukrainian forces between August 15, 2024, and March 12, 2025, following a Ukrainian incursion into the region.

== History ==
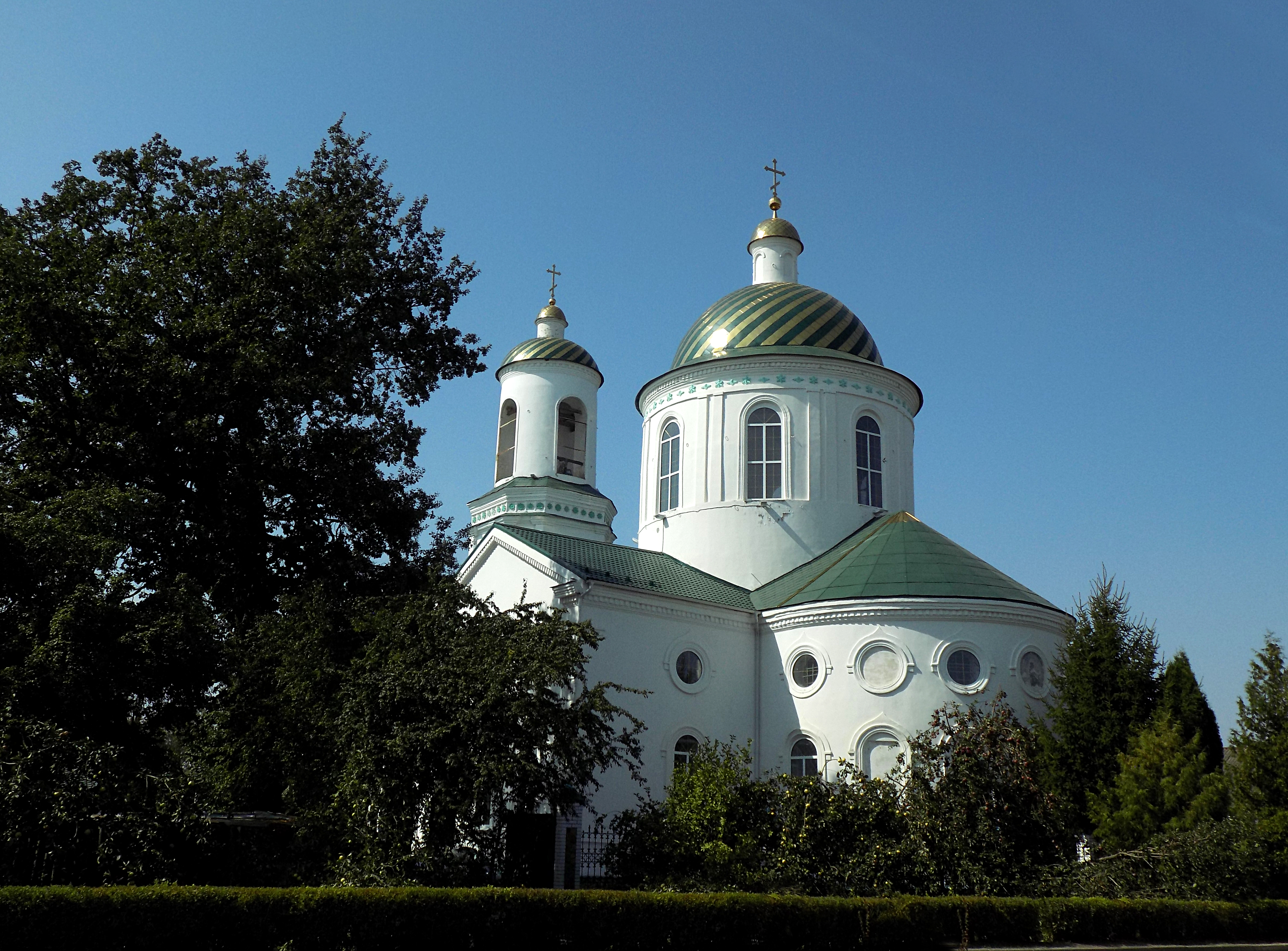
Early 19th-century Holy Trinity Church

=== Early history ===
It was founded on the site of an older settlement in 1661 by settlers from the Polish–Lithuanian Commonwealth and fortified with a rampart. An ostrog (fort) was soon erected and repeatedly rebuilt. Until 1664, it was ruled by an ataman before the administration of a voyevoda was introduced. Afterward, it became a town.

In 1708, it was included within the Kiev Governorate, and in 1779, it became the seat of the Sudzhansky Uyezd within the Kursk Governorate.

In 1870, the town had a population of 4,482 and the suburbs had a population of 5,624. In 1869, there were 393 craftsmen in the town, and in 1871, there were nine factories. In the late 19th century, the town hosted four annual fairs and two weekly markets. According to the 1897 Russian census, the town had a population of 7,433, of which 61.2% spoke Little Russian (Ukrainian), 37.2% spoke Great Russian (Russian), 1.2% spoke Yiddish, and 0.3% spoke Polish.

=== 20th century ===
Soviet power was established in December 1917. However, from April to November 1918, it was occupied by German and Ukrainian forces. From November 1918 to January 1919, Sudzha was the seat of the Provisional Workers' and Peasants' Government of Ukraine. The seat was subsequently moved to Belgorod. In August 1919, it was occupied by the Armed Forces of South Russia, and as a result of subsequent fighting, it changed hands several times until September. On November 26, 1919, it was occupied by the Red Army.

During World War II, Sudzha was occupied by German troops from October 18, 1941, to March 3, 1943. It was liberated by Red Army troops of the Voronezh Front during the Belgorod–Kharkov offensive operation.

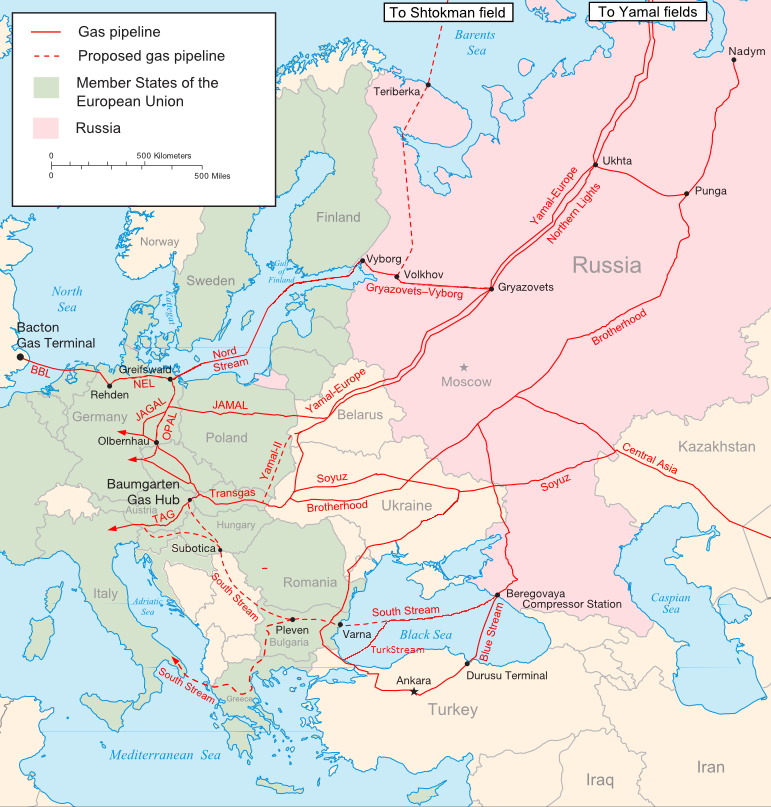
Major Russian gas transits to Europe, among which the Brotherhood pipeline

Later in the 20th century, a natural gas pipeline transit station was established near Sudzha. A gas metering station was installed. As of 2024, the output was fed to the Urengoy–Pomary–Uzhhorod pipeline.

=== 21st century ===
==== Russo-Ukrainian War ====
After the beginning of the full-scale Russian invasion of Ukraine in 2022, the Urengoy–Pomary–Uzhhorod pipeline at Sudzha became the last remaining point at which natural gas flowed from Russia to Europe through Ukraine after the 2022 Nord Stream pipeline sabotage.

On June 4, 2023, Russia said it shot down a Ukrainian drone over Sudzha.

===== Kursk offensive =====
On August 6, 2024, fierce fighting broke out at the border of Kursk Oblast and around Sudzha as part of an incursion by Ukrainian forces. The Ukrainian government confirmed the capture of the town on August 15 and announced the formation of a military administration in Ukrainian-occupied areas of Kursk Oblast. A statue of Vladimir Lenin in the town had been dismantled by August 16.

On March 12, 2025, Russian state media published footage of Russian troops raising flags in the center of Sudzha. On the same day, it was reported that the town was once again under Russian control.

== Government ==
Within the framework of administrative divisions, Sudzha serves as the administrative center of Sudzhansky District. As an administrative division, it is incorporated within Sudzhansky District as the town of district significance of Sudzha. As a municipal division, the town of district significance of Sudzha is incorporated within Sudzhansky Municipal District as Sudzha Urban Settlement.

== Demographics ==
The town's population has declined over the past few decades, from 7,487 in 1989 to 5,127 in 2021.

Population history
Year	1665	1897	1989	2002	2010	2021
Pop.	1,100	7,433	7,487	7,045	6,036	5,127
±% p.a.	—	+0.83%	+0.01%	−0.47%	−1.91%	−1.47%

== Gallery ==
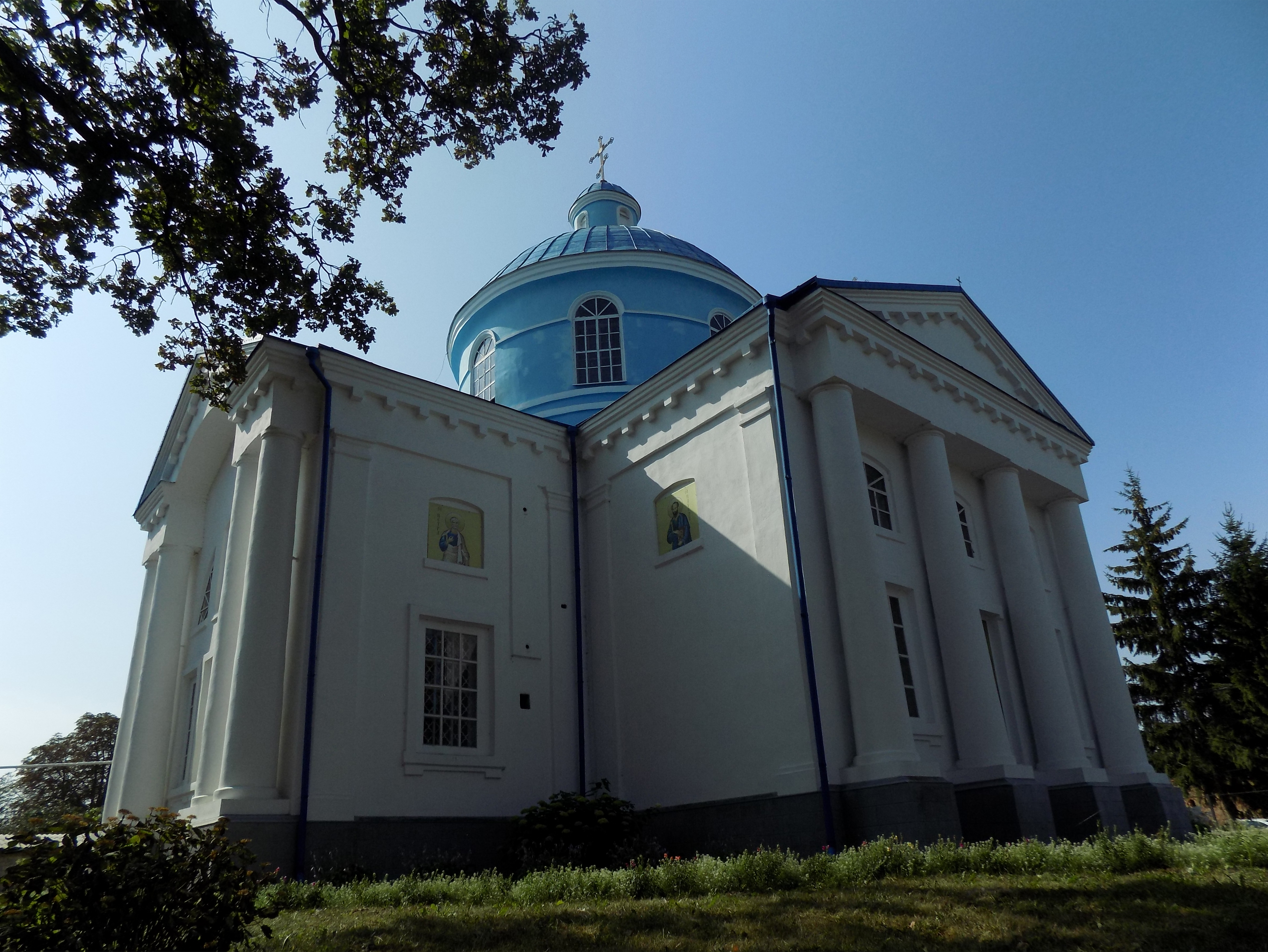
Church of the Protection of the Theotokos

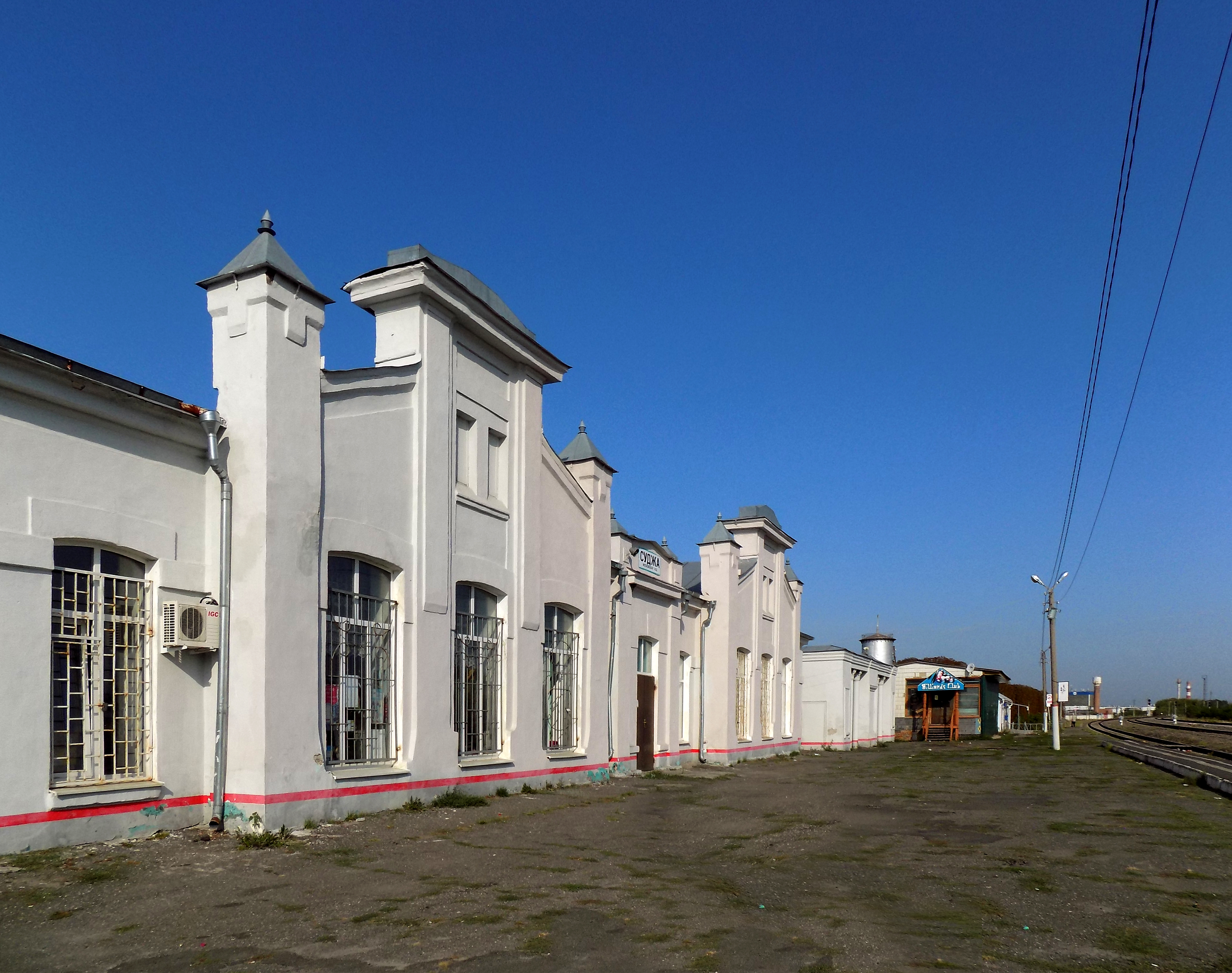
Railway station

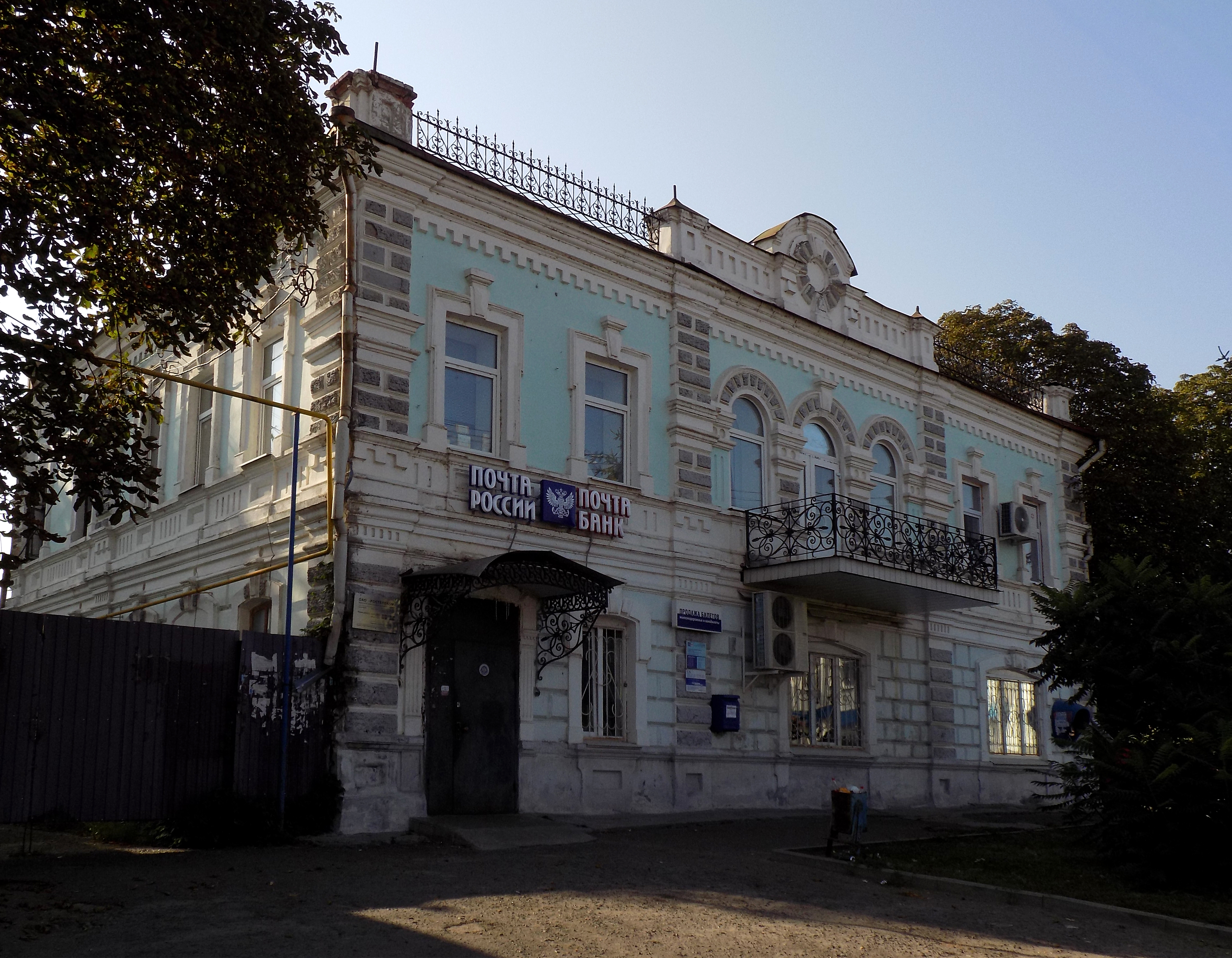
Post office

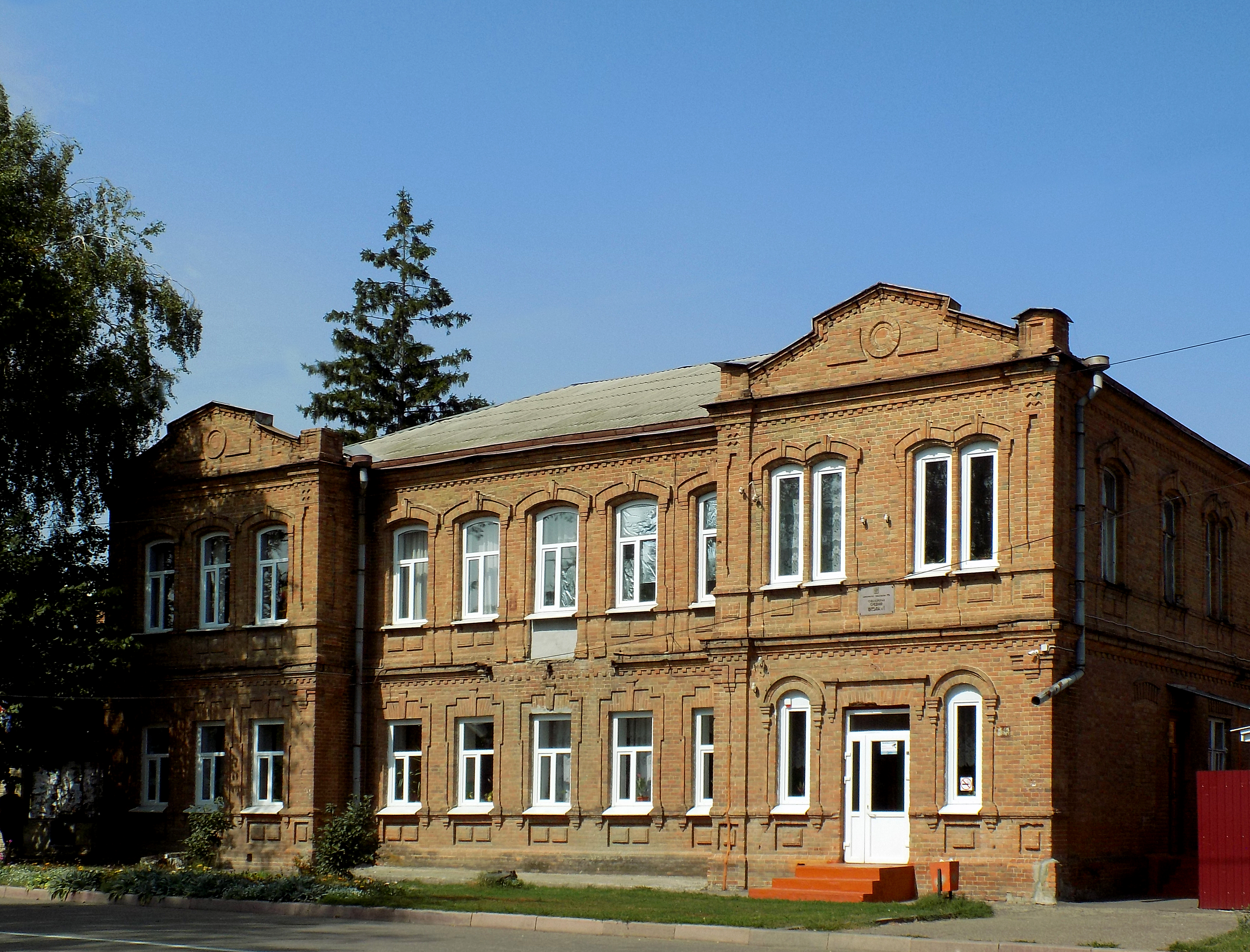
Former teacher's seminary

== Sources ==
- "Суджа" . Brockhaus and Efron Encyclopedic Dictionary (in Russian). 1906.
- Razdorsky, A. I. (2016). "Суджа". Большая Российская энциклопедия. Том 31: Социальное партнёрство — Телевидение (in Russian). Большая Российская энциклопедия. pp. 390–391. ISBN 978-5-85270-368-2. Archived from the original on August 27, 2025.
