= Timeline of the Russo-Ukrainian war (1 August – 31 December 2024) =

Timeline of the Russo-Ukrainian war (2022–present)
- Prelude; (up to 23 February 2022); Initial invasion; (24 February – 7 April 2022); Southeastern front; (8 April – 28 August 2022); 2022 Ukrainian counteroffensives; (29 August – 11 November 2022); Second stalemate; (12 November 2022 – 7 June 2023); 2023 Ukrainian counteroffensive; (8 June 2023 – 31 August 2023); 2023 Ukrainian counteroffensive, cont.; (1 September – 30 November 2023); 2023–2024 winter campaigns; (1 December 2023 – 31 March 2024); 2024 spring and summer campaigns; (1 April – 31 July 2024); 2024 summer–autumn offensives; (1 August – 31 December 2024); 2025 winter–spring offensives; (1 January 2025 – 31 May 2025); 2025 summer offensives; (1 June 2025 – 31 August 2025); 2025 autumn–winter offensives; (1 September 2025 – 31 December 2025); 2026 winter–spring offensives; (1 January 2026 – 31 May 2026); 2026 summer offensives; (1 June 2026 – 31 August 2026); 2026 autumn–winter offensives; (1 September 2026 – present)

This timeline of the Russo-Ukrainian war covers the period from 1 August to 31 December 2024.

== August 2024 ==
=== 1 August ===
Two people were killed by Russian shelling in Nikopol.

A Bulsae-4 anti-tank missile vehicle was reportedly spotted by a Ukrainian drone in Kharkiv Oblast, suggesting that Russia is using North Korean-made armoured vehicles.

Exiled Russian politician Ilya Ponomarev was injured in a drone attack on his residence near Kyiv.

Forbes claimed Ukraine launched more attack drones than Russia during the month of July.

The vessel Hetman Ivan Vyhovsky was launched in Istanbul as the second Turkish-built corvette commissioned for the Ukrainian Navy.

=== 2 August ===
Russian-installed officials and residents in Crimea reported missile and drone attacks across the peninsula, particularly in Sevastopol, Simferopol, Yevpatoria and Balaklava. Ukrainian forces claimed the submarine Rostov-na-Donu "sank on the spot" in the attack on Sevastopol while an S-400 launcher was also damaged.

The bodies of 250 soldiers were repatriated to Ukraine in exchange for those of 38 Russian soldiers.

Russian forces captured the village of Vesele in Donetsk Oblast.

Forbes estimated that 20 Russian regiments and brigades, "potentially" 40,000 troops, were advancing against six Ukrainian brigades of around 12,000 troops near Pokrovsk, and that the Russians were just 11 miles from the city. Ukrainian President Volodymyr Zelenskyy conceded that "this is where the fighting remains the most intense."

Romania and Ukraine announced a plan to manufacture and improve the Neptune missile.

=== 3 August ===
In Russia, Ukrainian drones attacked an oil depot in Gubkinsky, Belgorod Oblast. The regional governor, Vyacheslav Gladkov, said that an explosion occurred at one of the storage tanks. Ukrainian drones struck a 16-story building in Zlyn, Oryol Oblast causing a fire; however, no casualties were reported according to the regional governor Andrey Klychkov. Drones also hit Morozovsk, in Rostov Oblast, targeting an airfield where explosions were reported by locals. Ukrainian military intelligence (HUR) later claimed that a "fuel and lubricants warehouse" was hit by 15 drones in Kamensk-Shakhtinsky, Rostov Oblast. The regional governor also said that warehouses in the said areas were damaged.

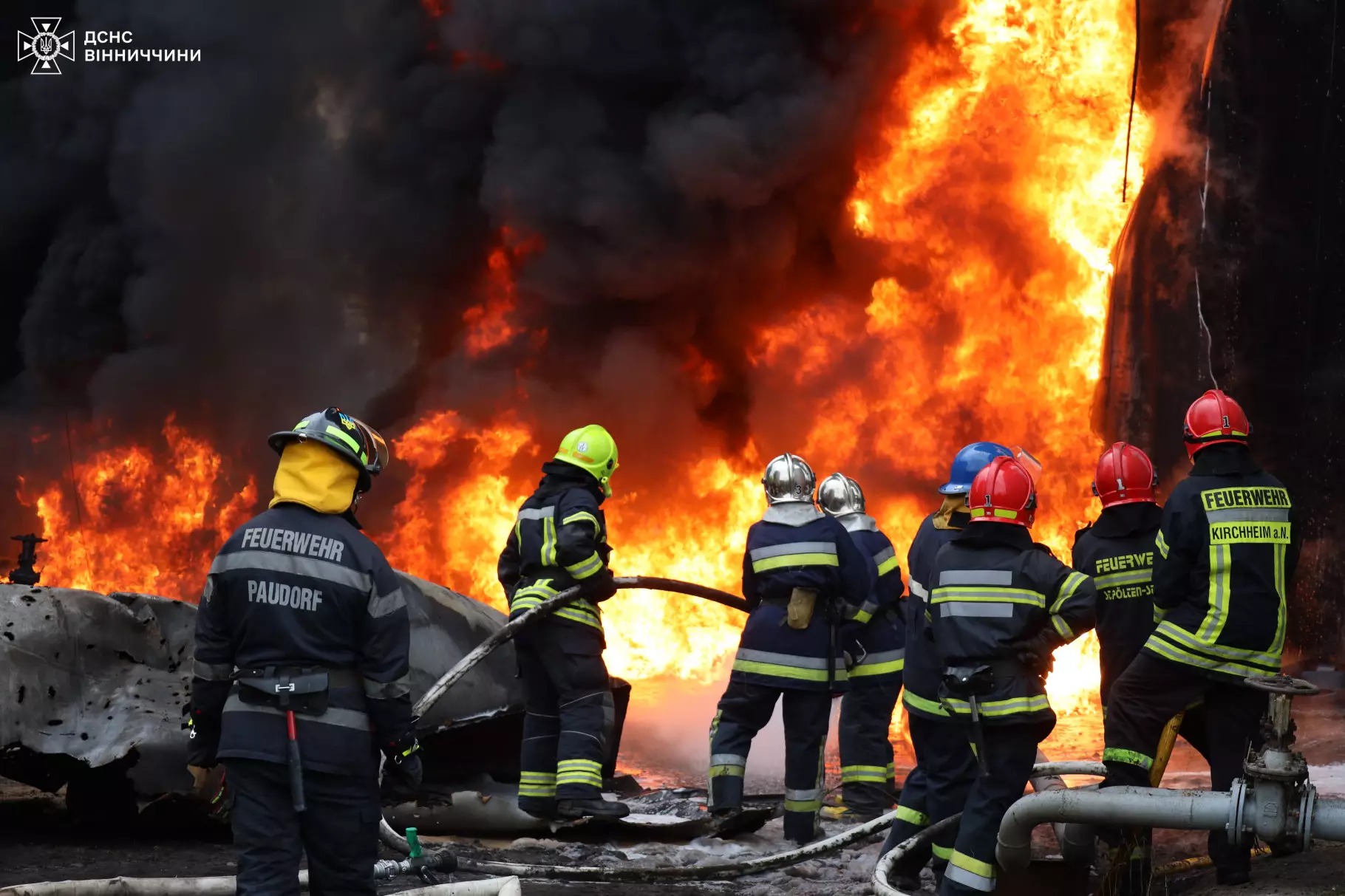
Fire on an infrastructure object in Vinnytsia Oblast after the attack

The Ukrainian Air Force claimed that Russia fired 29 "Shahed-type drones", two S-300 missiles and two Kh-31 missiles. A Ukrainian official said that "critical infrastructure" in Vinnytsia was hit by Russian drones. In Kherson, according to the regional governor, "critical infrastructure", administrative and civilian buildings were damaged. Ukrainian forces claimed to have shot down 24 of the drones.

A photo was released showing a Ukrainian POW with his head and limbs cut off. Dymtro Lubinets, Ukraine's Human Rights Commissioner, accused Russia of having tortured and killed him.

=== 4 August ===
Zelenskyy confirmed the arrival and deployment of the first batch of F-16 fighter jets pledged by Western countries in Ukraine and their usage by the Ukrainian Air Force.

Russian-installed officials in Luhansk claimed that a Ukrainian missile strike caused a fire in a machine repair and storage facility used by the Russian military.

Ukrainian authorities ordered the evacuation of 744 children and their families from four frontline settlements in Donetsk Oblast due to Russian attacks.

=== 5 August ===
The Security Service of Ukraine (SBU) announced the discovery of a "large-scale" sabotage network organised by the Russian Federal Security Service (FSB) that was operating in six oblasts, adding that nine people, including two city councilors in Dnipro and Yuzhne, Odesa Oblast, had been arrested on suspicion of membership of the group.

=== 6 August ===
In Russia, officials claimed that one person was killed in a Ukrainian drone strike in Belgorod Oblast, while two others were killed in a separate attack in Kursk Oblast, where Ukrainian forces reportedly attempted to make an incursion into the districts of Sudzha and Korenevo.

The SBU claimed to have damaged a Russian Mi-28 helicopter in Kursk Oblast with an FPV drone, calling it the first successful intercept of a helicopter mid-flight using a drone. Ukrainian military blog DeepState claimed that two Russian tanks were destroyed and a Ka-52 helicopter was also shot down in Kursk Oblast.

=== 7 August ===
The HUR claimed that it had carried out a raid with Ukrainian Special Forces on the Tendra Spit in occupied Kherson Oblast that inflicted casualties on Russian forces and destroyed MT-LB amphibious personnel carriers, electronic warfare systems and fortifications.

The Institute for the Study of War (ISW) estimated that Ukrainian forces had advanced up to ten kilometers into Russia's Kursk Oblast from their common border since the start of the incursion on 6 August and had seized a total area of some 45 square kilometers. The Ukrainian incursion involved some 1,000 soldiers, armoured vehicles and was supported by artillery and drones according to a Russian official. A state of emergency was declared in Kursk Oblast due to the ongoing incursion.

Russian forces seized the village of Serhiivka, east of Pokrovsk.

Ukrainian authorities ordered the evacuation of 6,000 people from 23 border communities in Sumy Oblast due to Russian attacks.

=== 8 August ===
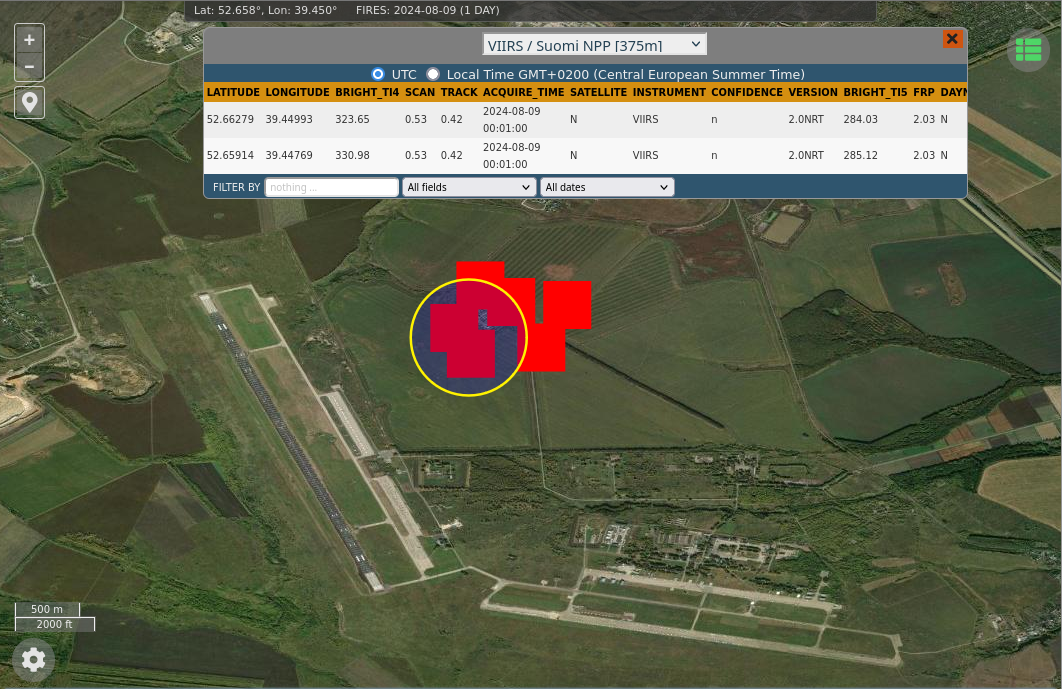
NASA's FIRMS detected extensive fire at a Lipetsk air base depot on 9 August 2024 00:01:00 (UTC)

Two people were killed in separate Russian attacks in Nikopol and Sumy Oblast. Two people were also killed in a Russian airstrike in Selydove, Donetsk Oblast.

Wagner Group units were deployed to Kursk Oblast to repel the Ukrainian incursion.

Mexico turned down a request by Ukraine to arrest Russian president Vladimir Putin under the warrant issued against him by the International Criminal Court for war crimes during his scheduled attendance at the inauguration of president-elect Claudia Sheinbaum in October.

=== 9 August ===
A massive drone attack was reported across Russia's Lipetsk Oblast, which authorities attributed to Ukraine. At least six people were injured, while four villages were ordered evacuated. Ukraine subsequently claimed that it had struck the Lipetsk air base and destroyed warehouses storing ammunition. Russian authorities also claimed that one person was killed in a separate attack in Belgorod Oblast. A HIMARS strike hit a Russian convoy of some 13 trucks, near Oktyabrskoye, Kursk Oblast. Video on social media showed burnt out trucks and soldiers' bodies. Ukraine increased its total amount of occupied territory in Kursk Oblast to an estimated 350 square kilometers. As of 9 August there is believed to be elements from 4–5 Ukrainian brigades operating in Kursk, some 10–12,000 troops.

The SBU have claimed to have struck a Russian helicopter mid-flight with an FPV drone. The drone, carrying a "powerful fragmentation warhead", struck the helicopter near the tail rotor. According to one Ukrainian source it was a Mi-8 helicopter. The fate of the helicopter or the crew is unknown.

Russia reportedly recaptured the village of Nevelske in Donetsk Oblast.

The HUR claimed that Ukrainian special forces, with the help of the Ukrainian Navy, launched an airborne raid on the Russian-occupied Kinburn Spit at the mouth of the Dnipro River in Mykolaiv Oblast, killing around 30 soldiers and destroying six armored vehicles. It also claimed to have destroyed a Russian KS-701 Tunets patrol boat and damaged three other vessels in a separate attack near Chornomorske, Crimea using a naval drone.

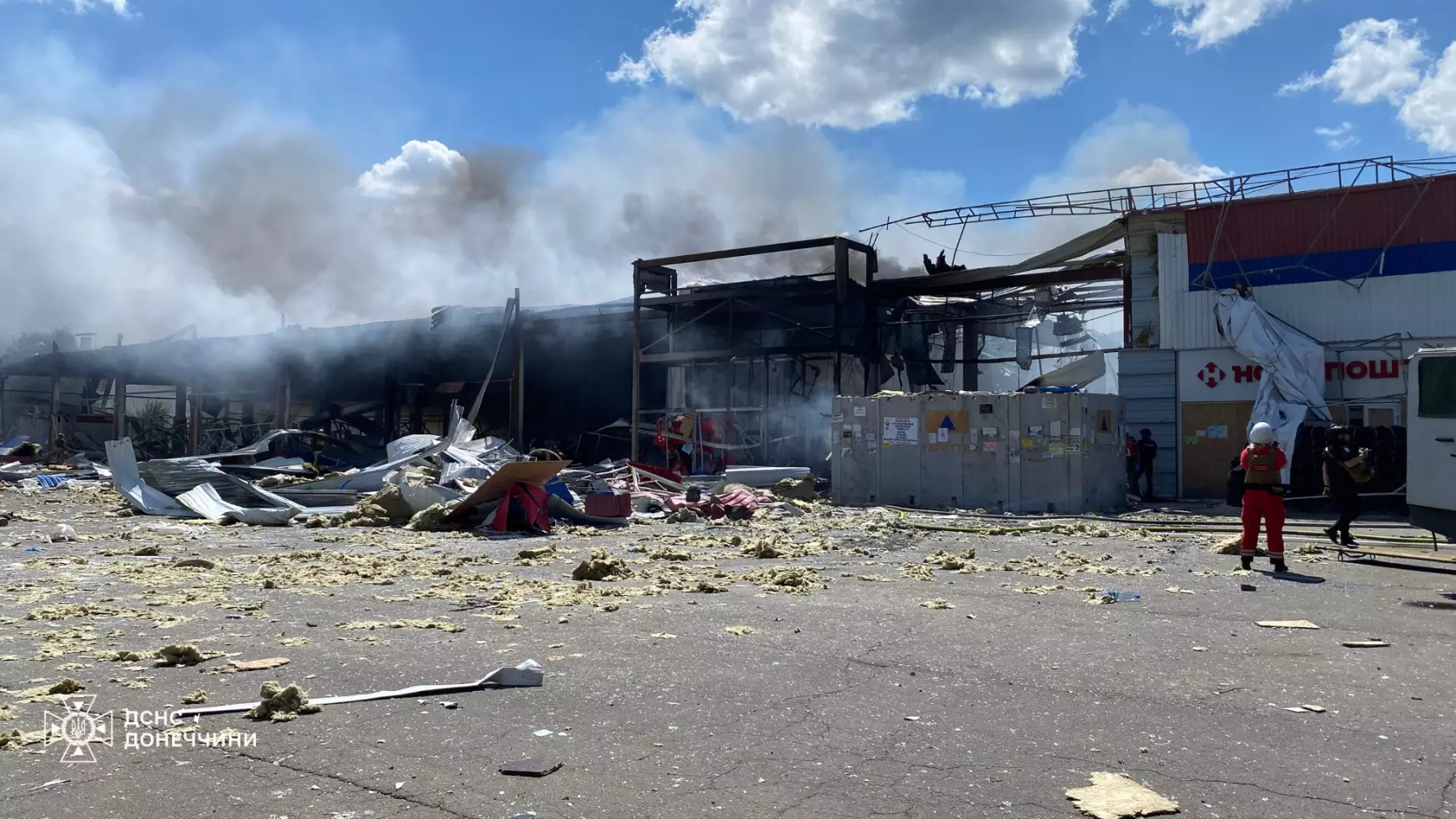
Supermarket in Kostiantynivka after the strike

A supermarket in Kostiantynivka was struck by a Russian missile, killing at least 14 people and injuring at least 43 others.

The governor of Sevastopol, Mikhail Razvozhayev, reported an attack near Belbek airfield. He said the attack involved unmanned aerial and maritime drones plus one Neptune missile, which was shot down. Falling debris was reported in Sevastopol and other parts of Crimea.

The UK Defence Ministry assessed that Russian forces were now 16 kilometers away from Pokrovsk.

The United States pledged a $125-million military aid package to Ukraine that included Stinger missiles, 155mm and 105mm artillery ammunition, HIMARS ammunition and vehicles.

=== 10 August ===
Ruins of Chasiv Yar, 10 August 2024

A Ka-52 helicopter was reportedly shot down by Ukrainian forces in Kursk Oblast.

A video appeared to show Ukrainian soldiers in the village of Poroz, Belgorod Oblast.

=== 11 August ===
Two people were killed in a Russian missile attack on Brovary Raion, Kyiv Oblast.

During the night of 10–11 August, the Russian Defence Ministry claimed to have shot down 30 Ukrainian UAVs and four Tochka-U missiles over Belgorod, Kursk, Voronezh, Bryansk and Oryol oblasts. A downed missile struck a high rise apartment block in Kursk Oblast, causing a fire that also hit cars in the street. Some 13 people were reported wounded, two seriously. In Shebekino, Belgorod Oblast, houses and a high rise building were damaged. Part of the town lost power. In Voronezh Oblast, government and private buildings were damaged without casualties.

A fire broke out at a cooling tower of the Zaporizhzhia Nuclear Power Plant, with Russian-installed authorities blaming the incident on Ukrainian shelling and Zelenskyy accusing Russian forces of responsibility.

=== 12 August ===
According to the Kursk governor, Alexei Smirnov, Ukraine controls 28 settlements along a front that is 12 km deep and 40 km wide. Some 2,000 Russians are living under Ukrainian control while another 121,000 have been evacuated and another 180,000 are awaiting evacuation.

Oleksandr Myhulia, the commander of an aviation unit of the 40th Tactical Aviation Brigade of the Ukrainian Air Force, was killed in action.

=== 13 August ===
Russian forces seized the villages of Ivanivka and Svyrdonivka, both 15 kilometers east of Pokrovsk.

President Putin appointed Aleksey Dyumin, a former bodyguard and current head of the State Council, as the head of the Russian response to the Ukrainian incursion into Kursk Oblast, where Ukrainian forces claimed to be holding approximately 1,000 square kilometres of territory. In his evening address, President Zelenskyy said that Ukrainian forces were in control of 74 settlements inside Kursk Oblast.

A Ukrainian Su-27 launched a JDAM at a Russian command post in Tyotkino, Kursk Oblast, which was reportedly destroyed. Russian jets were reported to have redirected up to half of their normal glide bombing missions against Ukrainian targets in Sumy Oblast, where the Ukrainian forces are headquartered.

=== 14 August ===
Russia accused Ukraine of carrying out a massive air and drone attack on Kursk, Voronezh, Belgorod, Nizhny Novgorod, Volgograd, Bryansk, Oryol, and Rostov Oblasts, adding that it had shot down 117 drones and four missiles. According to local media, at least 10 Ukrainian drones struck Savaskeyka airbase, causing explosions. Gleb Nikitin, the governor of Nizhny Novgorod, said that the raid had been repelled without any casualties. However, an HUR source told The Kyiv Independent that three Russian aircraft were destroyed and five others were damaged during the attack.

A state of emergency was declared in Belgorod Oblast by governor Vyacheslav Gladkov due to the Ukrainian incursion.

Russia captured the villages of Zhelanne and Orlivka, east of Pokrovsk.

The Ukrainian military claimed to have shot down an Su-34 over Kursk Oblast.

Two medics were killed in a Russian drone strike in Bilyi Kolodiaz, Kharkiv Oblast, while two others were injured in a Russian missile attack on the port of Odesa.

The SBU announced the discovery of a spy network working on behalf of Russia whose membership included two members of former President Viktor Yanukovych's security team and a serving member of the National Guard of Ukraine.

A court in Germany ordered the arrest of a Ukrainian diving instructor on suspicion of involvement in the 2022 Nord Stream pipeline sabotage.

=== 15 August ===
Oleksandr Syrskyi, the Commander-in-Chief of the Armed Forces of Ukraine, announced the establishment of a military administration in occupied parts of Kursk Oblast to be headed by General Eduard Moskaliov, adding that 82 settlements in the oblast were now under Kyiv's control. In his evening address, Zelenskyy said that Ukrainian forces had taken full control of Sudzha.

The acting governor of Kursk Oblast, Alexei Smirnov, announced the evacuation of some 20,000 people from the Glushkovsky District, some 20 kilometers behind the current front lines. In Belgorod Oblast, four people, including two paramedics, were reportedly injured in Ukrainian drone attacks in Shebekino.

One person was killed in a Russian airstrike in Sumy Oblast.

Ukrainian authorities in Donetsk Oblast reported that Russian forces were now 10 kilometers away from Pokrovsk, and urged all citizens to evacuate.

Ukrainian authorities charged in absentia the Russian-installed head of Kherson Oblast, Vladimir Saldo, with the illegal removal of over 2,800 tons of grain from the Kherson Bread Products Plant.

=== 16 August ===
Ukraine launched attacks at the Kerch ferry crossing in Crimea and a boat in Chernomorsky in neighboring Krasnodar Krai. Russia claimed that 12 ATACMS missiles were shot down near the Crimean Bridge, which was temporarily closed. Local Telegraph channels also reported explosions in Simferopol and Sevastopol. The Russian Defense Ministry also claimed that its helicopters destroyed five naval drones.

Ukrainian authorities in Donetsk Oblast reported that Russian forces were now six kilometers away from Myrnohrad.

Russian-installed authorities in Donetsk Oblast accused Ukraine of shelling a shopping mall in Donetsk city, killing two people and injuring seven others.

Ukraine acknowledged the loss of a MiG-29 fighter jet following a claim by Russia that it had attacked an airbase in Dnipropetrovsk Oblast.

The Ukrainian Ministry of Culture and Information Policy posted photos of a monument of Vladimir Lenin in Sudzha being demolished by Ukrainian forces.

=== 17 August ===
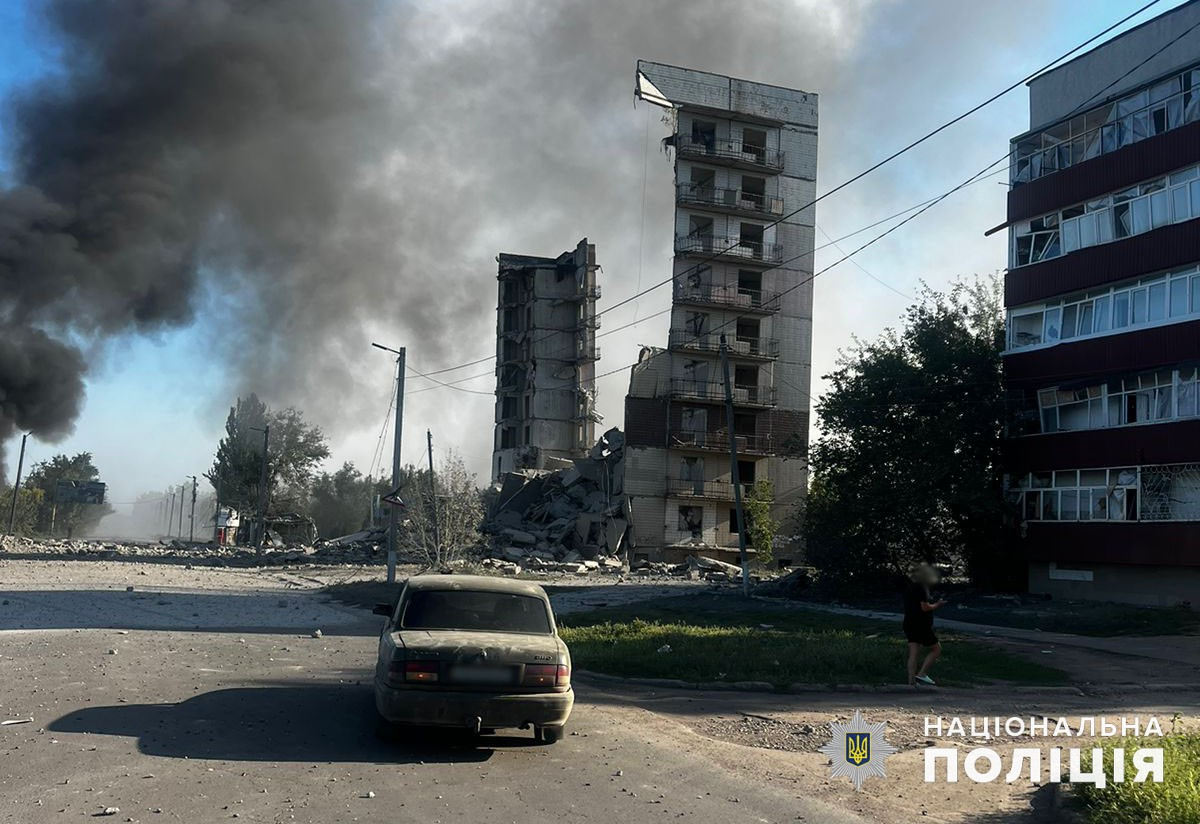
Building in Myrnohrad after the attack

One person was killed in a Russian attack on Myrnohrad.

A Ukrainian source said that Russia had deployed around 5,000 troops from eastern Ukraine to Kursk Oblast since the start of Ukraine's Kursk offensive.

A drone strike occurred on a road near the perimeter of the Zaporizhzhia Nuclear Power Plant, which Russia blamed on Ukraine.

=== 18 August ===
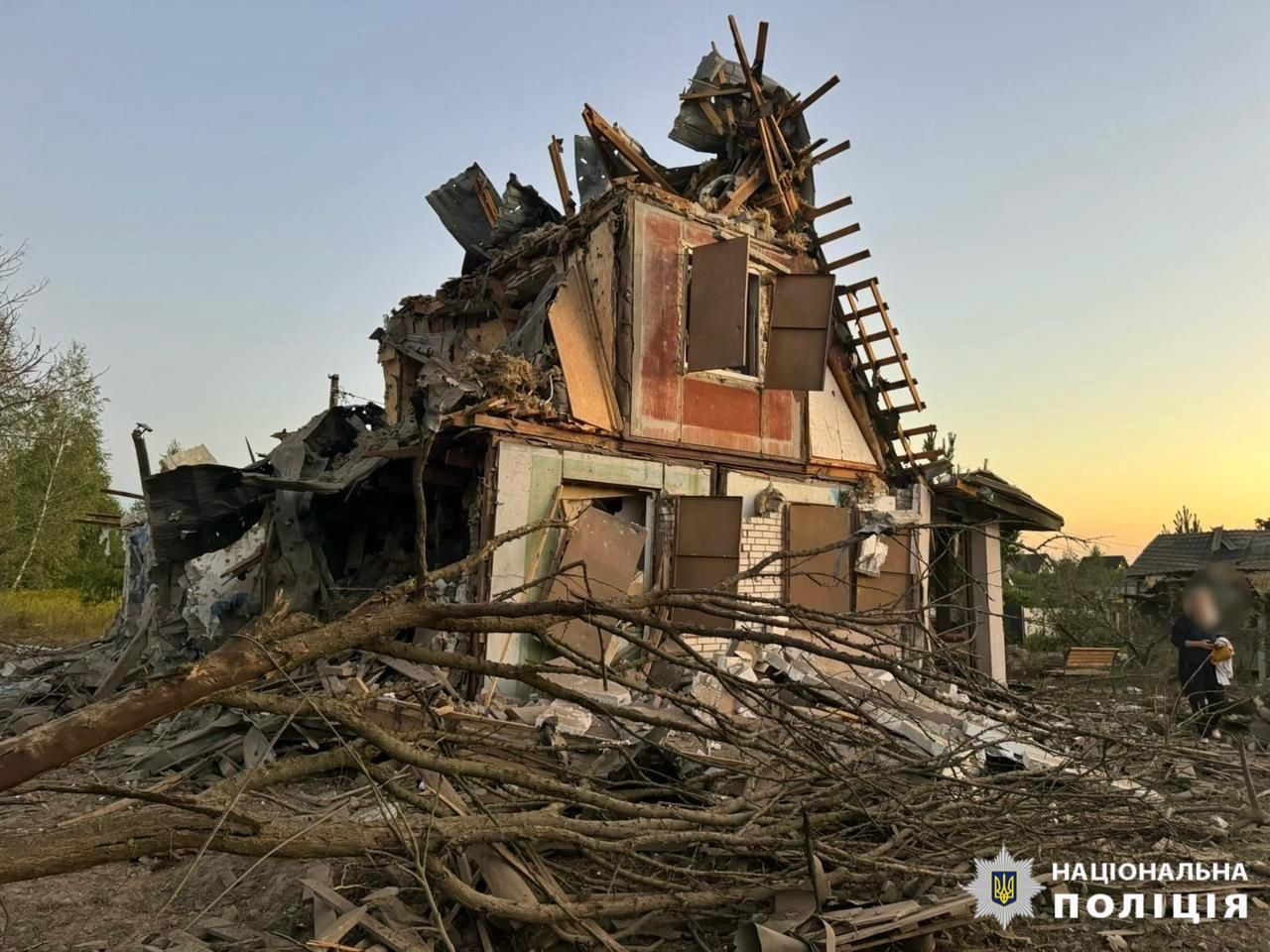
House in Kyiv Oblast, destroyed by fragments of a downed drone or missile

Russia captured the villages of Novozhelanne and Zavitne, east of Pokrovsk.

Five people were killed in Russian attacks in Donetsk and Sumy Oblasts.

In Russia, an oil depot was struck by a drone in Proletarsk, Rostov Oblast, causing a fire that took until 2 September to put out.

Russian forces reportedly began deploying units drawn from the VKS in Kursk Oblast, consisting of soldiers who guarded airbases, nuclear installations, staff from a cosmodrome, Voronezh radar station plus "engineers, mechanics…and a few flight crew officers" organised into motorised rifle units.

=== 19 August ===
Russia captured the villages of Skuchne and Mezhove, east of Pokrovsk, and claimed to have taken the city of Zalizne, southeast of Toretsk.

Four people were killed in Russian attacks in Donetsk Oblast.

Ukrainian forces destroyed the third, and last, bridge over the Seym river in Kursk Oblast, disrupting Russian logistics in the Glushkovsky district while potentially encircling 700–800 Russian paratroopers. In his evening address, Zelenskyy claimed that Ukrainian forces were now in control over 92 settlements in Kursk Oblast and 1,250 square kilometers of Russian territory.

Ukrainian officials ordered the forced evacuation of women and children from Pokrovsk due to rapid Russian advances.

The SBU announced the discovery of a Russian espionage network composed of serving and former Ukrainian law enforcement officials operating in Mykolaiv, Dnipropetrovsk, and Ivano-Frankivsk Oblasts, adding that two suspects were arrested.

Denmark pledged a new $115 million military aid package to Ukraine.

=== 20 August ===
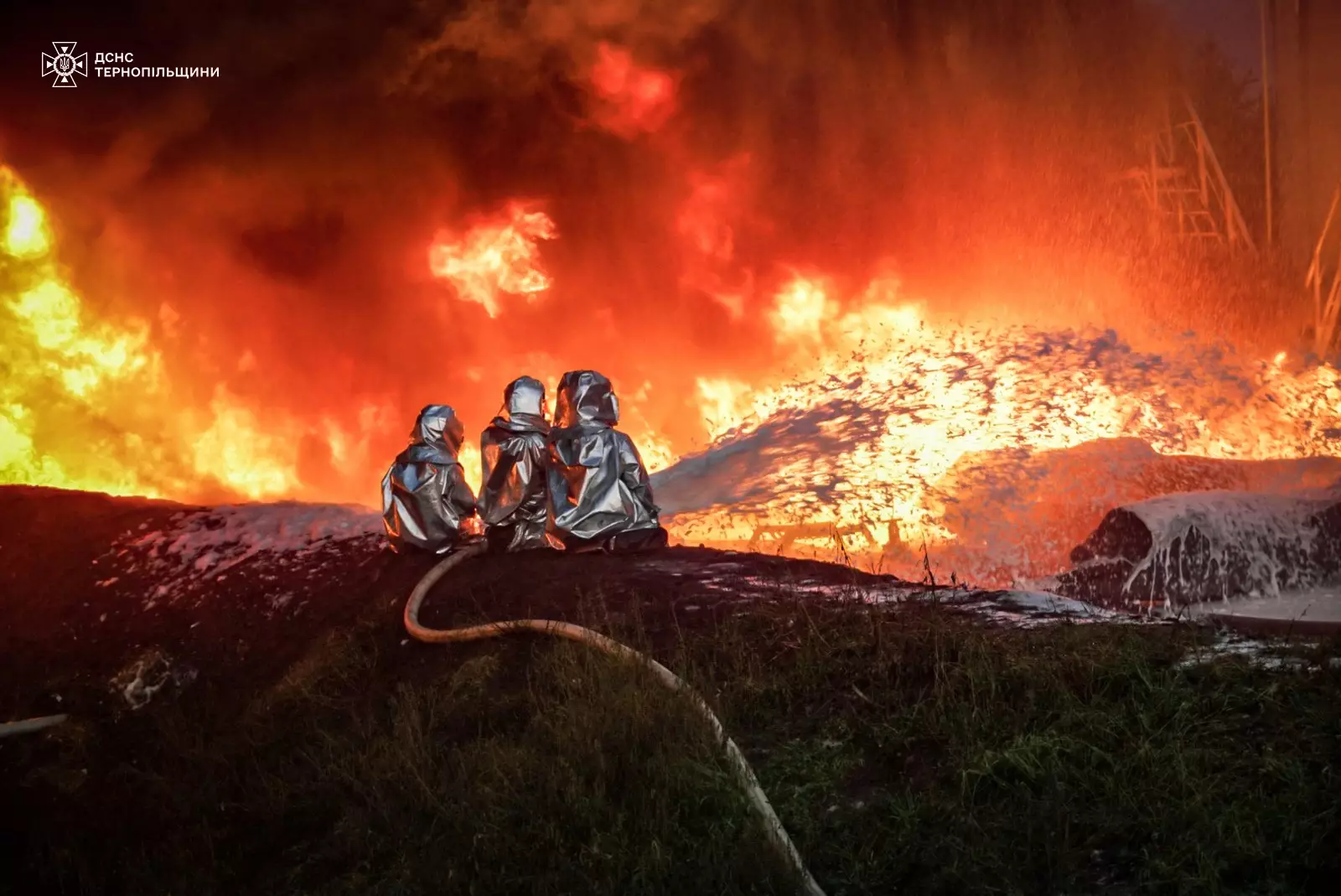
Industrial facility in Ternopil after the attack

Russia claimed to have taken New York, south of Toretsk.

A 15-year-old was killed in a Russian missile attack on a children's cafe in Zaporizhzhia Oblast. A separate missile attack on an industrial facility in Ternopil forced officials to issue health warnings due to increased chlorine levels in the air.

The Czech Defense Ministry announced that it would use revenue from Russian assets frozen by the EU to purchase "several hundred thousand pieces of large-caliber ammunition" for Ukraine.

Germany announced that it would send four more IRIS-T launchers to Ukraine by the end of 2024.

The Ukrainian Air Force claimed that AASM Hammer bombs struck an "underground control point" in Kursk Oblast. One of two pontoon bridges over the Seym River was also reported to have "disappeared" from satellite imagery, with explosions reported nearby.

=== 21 August ===
Ukraine launched a massive drone attack on western Russia, with Russian authorities claiming that 45 drones were shot down over Bryansk, Belgorod, Kaluga, Kursk and Moscow Oblasts. No damage or casualties were reported; however, two major airports in Moscow were forced to suspend flights. The Ukrainian military claimed to have struck a Russian S-300 air defense system in Rostov Oblast possibly by using a Neptune missile.

Russian forces took the settlement of Komyshivka, east of Pokrovsk.

The governor of Bryansk Oblast claimed that Russian forces had repelled an infiltration attempt by a Ukrainian sabotage and reconnaissance group in Klimovsky District.

The Netherlands announced that it would provide 51 drone detecting radars to Ukraine by the end of the year.

The Freedom of Russia Legion announced the defection of a Russian drone pilot who threw a grenade at his commander and other officers at a Storm Zet unit headquarters before fleeing to Ukraine and joining the legion.

=== 22 August ===
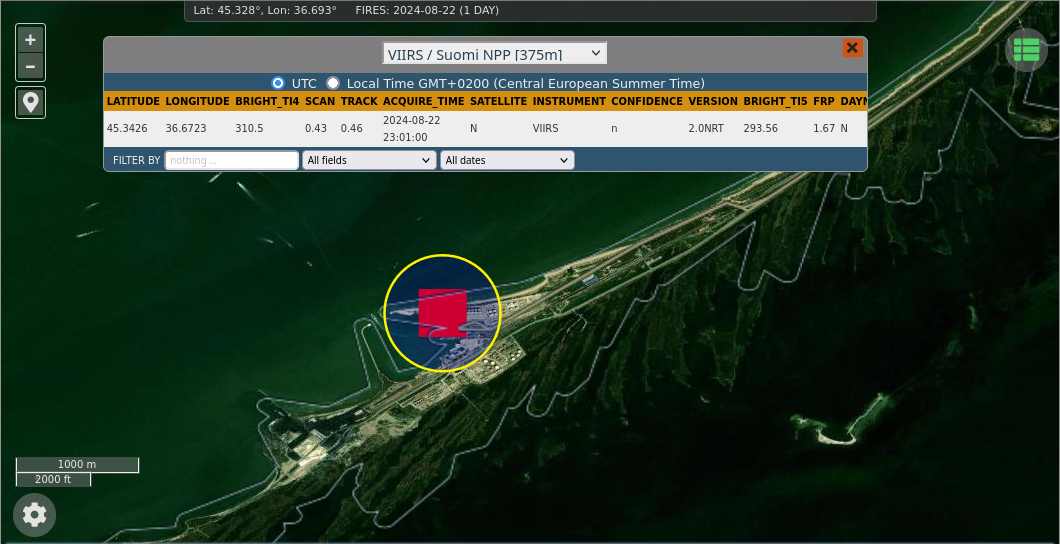
The 22 August fire in Port Kavkaz detected by NASA's FIRMS

Three people were killed in Russian attacks in Kharkiv and Sumy Oblasts.

Russia seized the settlement of Ptyche, east of Pokrovsk. The ISW reported that Ukrainian forces had retreated from certain positions southeast of Pokrovsk to avoid encirclement by Russian forces.

The Ukrainian military claimed to have launched a counterattack in Kharkiv Oblast, retaking up to two kilometers of territory and preventing a Russian attack from Makiivka, Luhansk Oblast.

Ukrainian drones attacked Marinovka air base in Volgograd Oblast, setting fire to storage facilities for fuel and bombs. Residents of nearby Kalach-na-Donu reported multiple explosions.

Traffic over the Crimean Bridge was closed due to a "missile threat", while sea and land traffic near Sevastopol was also suspended. A ferry carrying railroad cars containing fuel was struck by a Ukrainian Neptune missile in Port Kavkaz, Krasnodar Krai. The ferry was reported as being "half submerged", with one crew member reported missing.

The Ukrainian Air Force bombed an electronic warfare unit, a UAV command post and a "platoon strong point" in Kursk Oblast.

President Zelenskyy visited frontline areas of Sumy Oblast and held a meeting with Ukrainian military commander Oleksandr Syrskyi.

Ynet reported that at least 100 Jewish Ukrainian soldiers had been killed fighting Russia since the beginning of the invasion.

=== 23 August ===
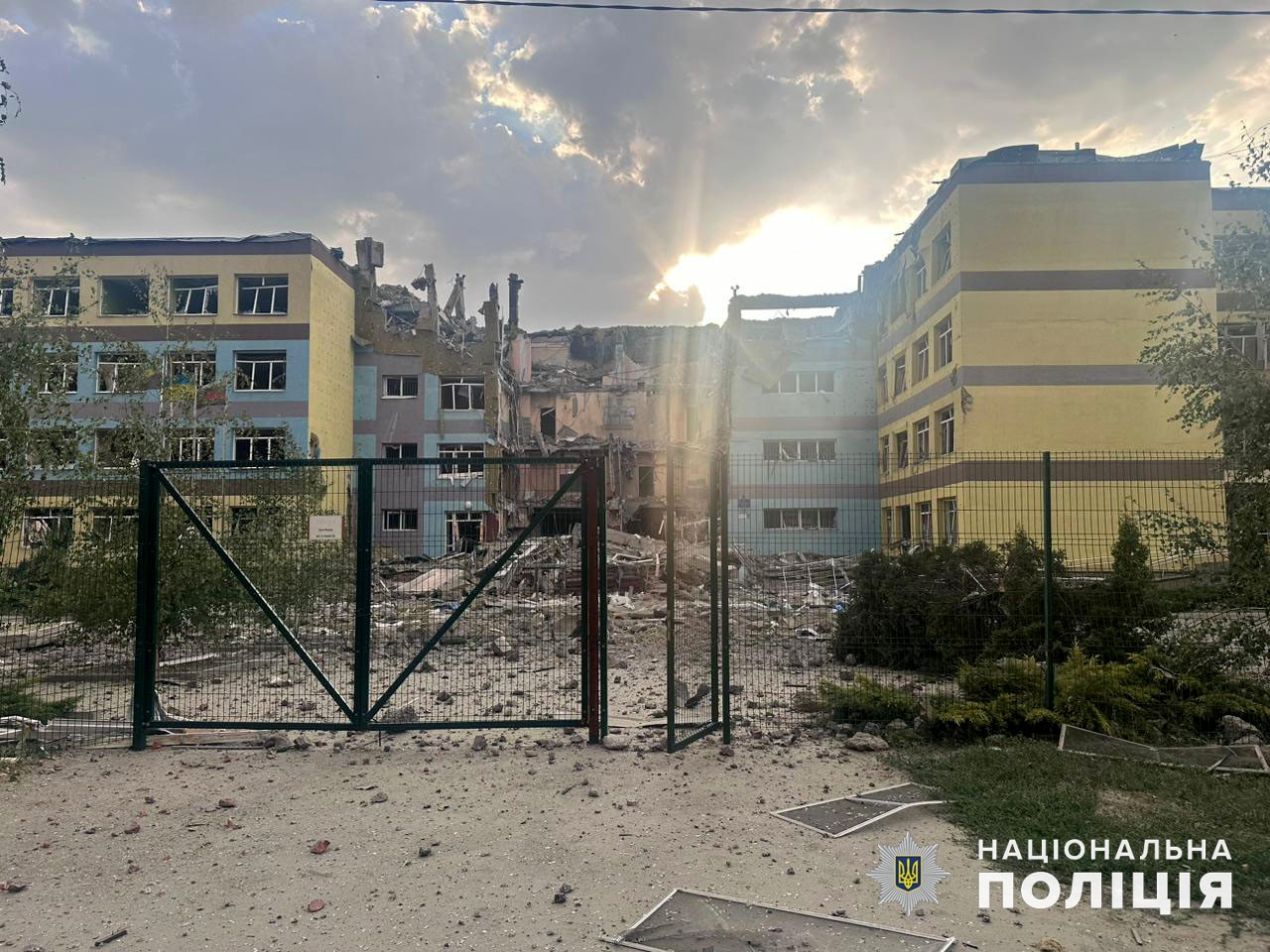
School in Selydove, bombed on 23 August

Russian forces made their first visually confirmed advance into Toretsk, entering it from the south.

Russia was visually confirmed to have seized the village of Mykolaivka, east of Pokrovsk.

Norway announced that it would fund the production of 155 mm Nammo artillery shells in Ukraine.

=== 24 August ===
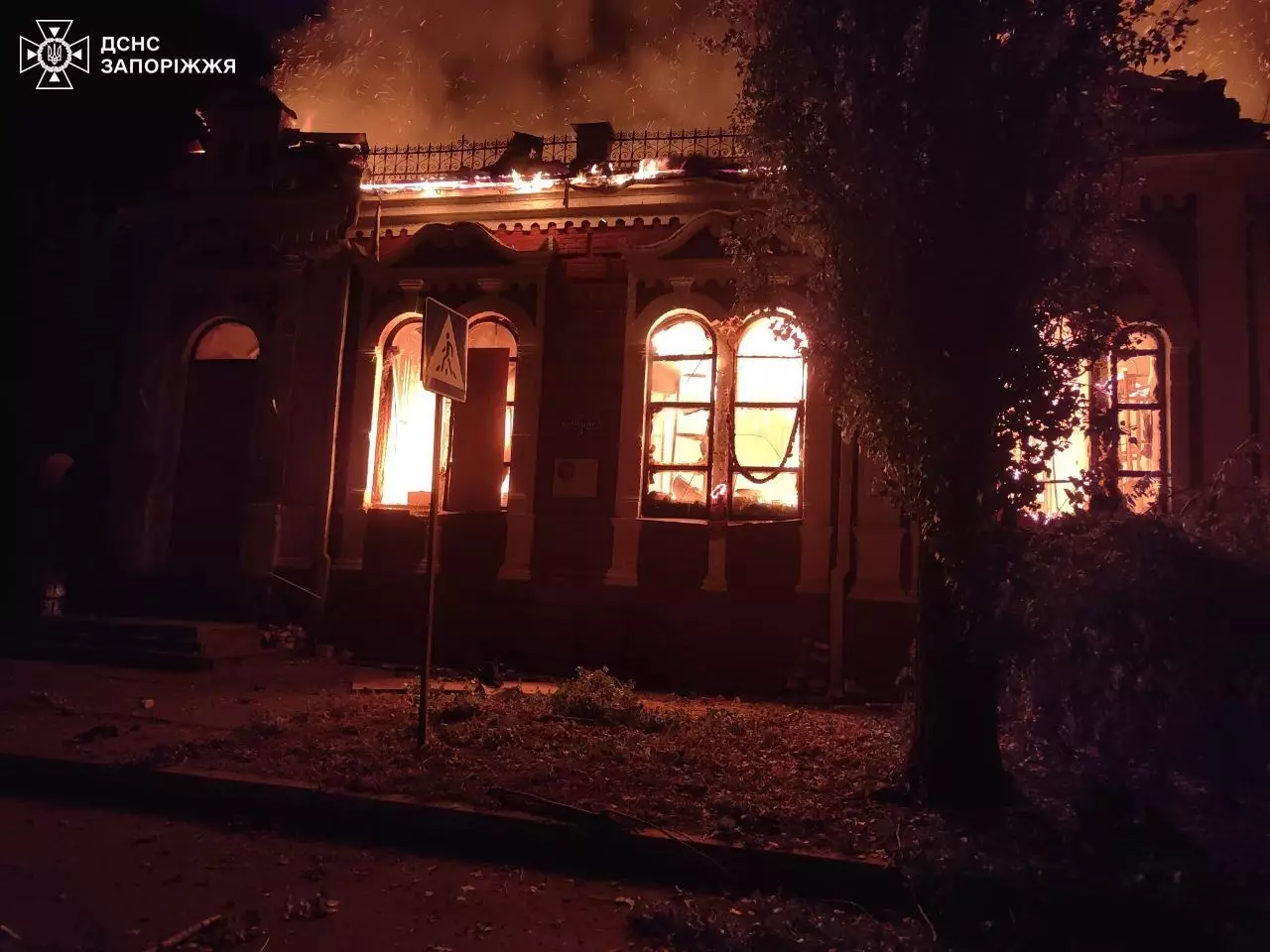
Building of Huliaipole Local Museum after Russian shelling on 24 August

Five people were killed by Russian shelling in Kostiantynivka. Four people were killed in separate attacks in Sumy Oblast.

The local museum of Huliaipole, Zaporizhzhia Oblast, devoted mainly to Ukrainian 20th-century anarchist figure Nestor Makhno, was destroyed in a Russian attack.

Russia and Ukraine conducted a prisoner exchange mediated by the United Arab Emirates that led to the parties releasing 115 POWs each.

Alexander Gusev, the governor of Voronezh Oblast, claimed that Russian forces intercepted five Ukrainian drones. Falling debris from one set fire to a warehouse that contained "explosive materials" leading to an explosion. Two hundred people were evacuated and a state of emergency declared.

Zelenskyy signed into law a bill banning religious organisations connected with Russia.

Ukraine announced the first operational use of a "Palianytsia" missile-drone. The weapon is classified as both a missile and a drone. It struck an "enemy military facility" somewhere in occupied Ukraine.

=== 25 August ===
Hotel in Kramatorsk after the attack

A Russian missile attack struck the Hotel Sapphire hosting foreign journalists in Kramatorsk. Six people, including three Reuters journalists were injured while a safety adviser from the UK was killed.

Three people were killed in Russian attacks in Sumy Oblast.

Five people were killed and 13 others were injured by Ukrainian shelling in Rakitnoye, Belgorod Oblast.

The Ukrainian Ministry of Foreign Affairs called on Belarus to withdraw its forces from the Belarus-Ukrainian international border.

=== 26 August ===
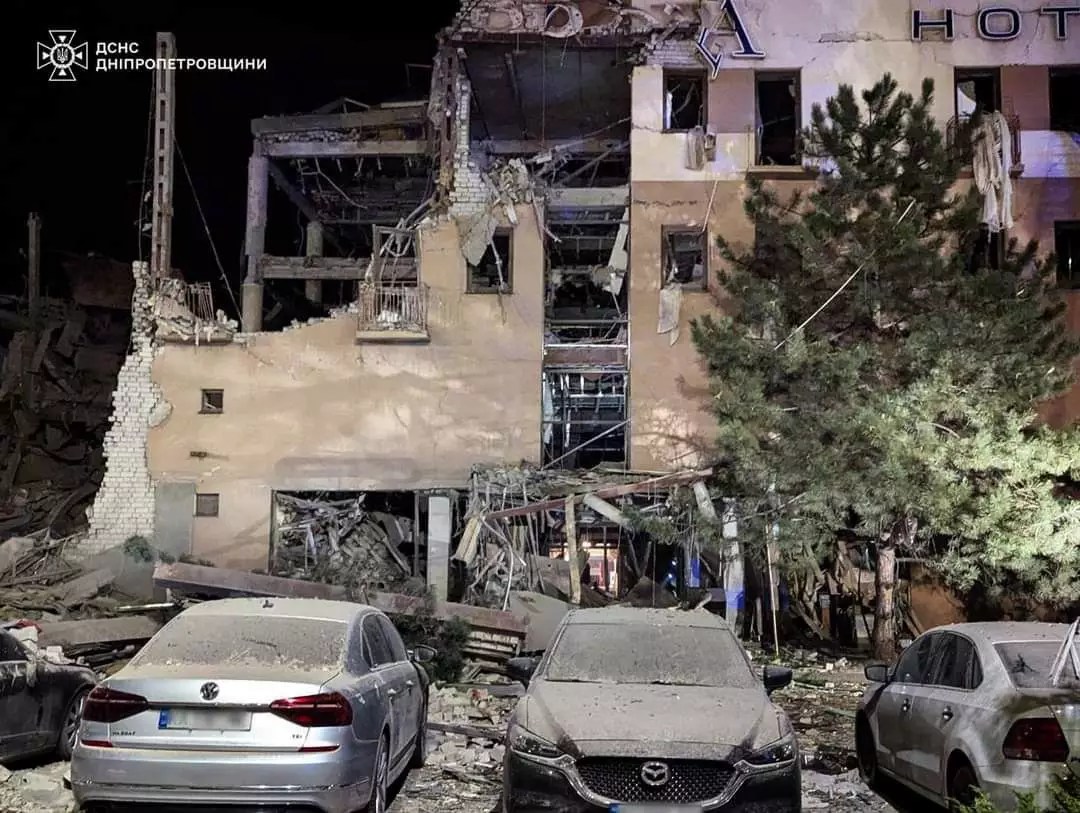
Hotel in Kryvyi Rih after the strike

Russia launched a massive air attack on 15 regions across Ukraine. At least seven people were killed in Lutsk and in Dnipropetrovsk, Zaporizhzhia, Poltava and Zhytomyr Oblasts, The Kyiv Hydroelectric Power Plant was also struck, damaging an energy facility. In the evening, four people were killed and five others were injured in a missile strike on a hotel in Kryvyi Rih. Ukrainian F-16s were used for the first time to intercept cruise missiles. However, the Ukrainian Air Force subsequently announced the loss of an F-16 and its pilot during the attacks.

In Russia, authorities in Saratov Oblast claimed that four people were injured in Ukrainian drone attacks on Saratov city and Engels. Saratov Gagarin Airport suspended flights while Russian officials claimed to have shot down nine drones over the region.

=== 27 August ===
Russia launched another wave of air attacks across Ukraine. Three people were killed in Russian drone attacks on Zaporizhzhia Oblast. One person was killed in a missile strike in Bohodukhiv.

Russia captured the village of Kalynove, southeast of Pokrovsk, and likely captured the village of Kostiantynivka, southwest of Donetsk. It also took full control over the city of Novohrodivka, nine kilometers southeast of Pokrovsk.

The SBU arrested a man in Kharkiv on suspicion of spying on Patriot air defence systems for Russia.

Ukraine claimed to have successfully tested its first domestically developed ballistic missile.

Colonel-General Oleksandr Syrskyi said that Ukraine controlled nearly 1,300 square kilometres of Kursk Oblast and captured 594 Russian prisoners since its incursion began. Syrskyi also claimed Russia had redeployed 30,000 soldiers "from other sectors" to Kursk Oblast.

=== 28 August ===
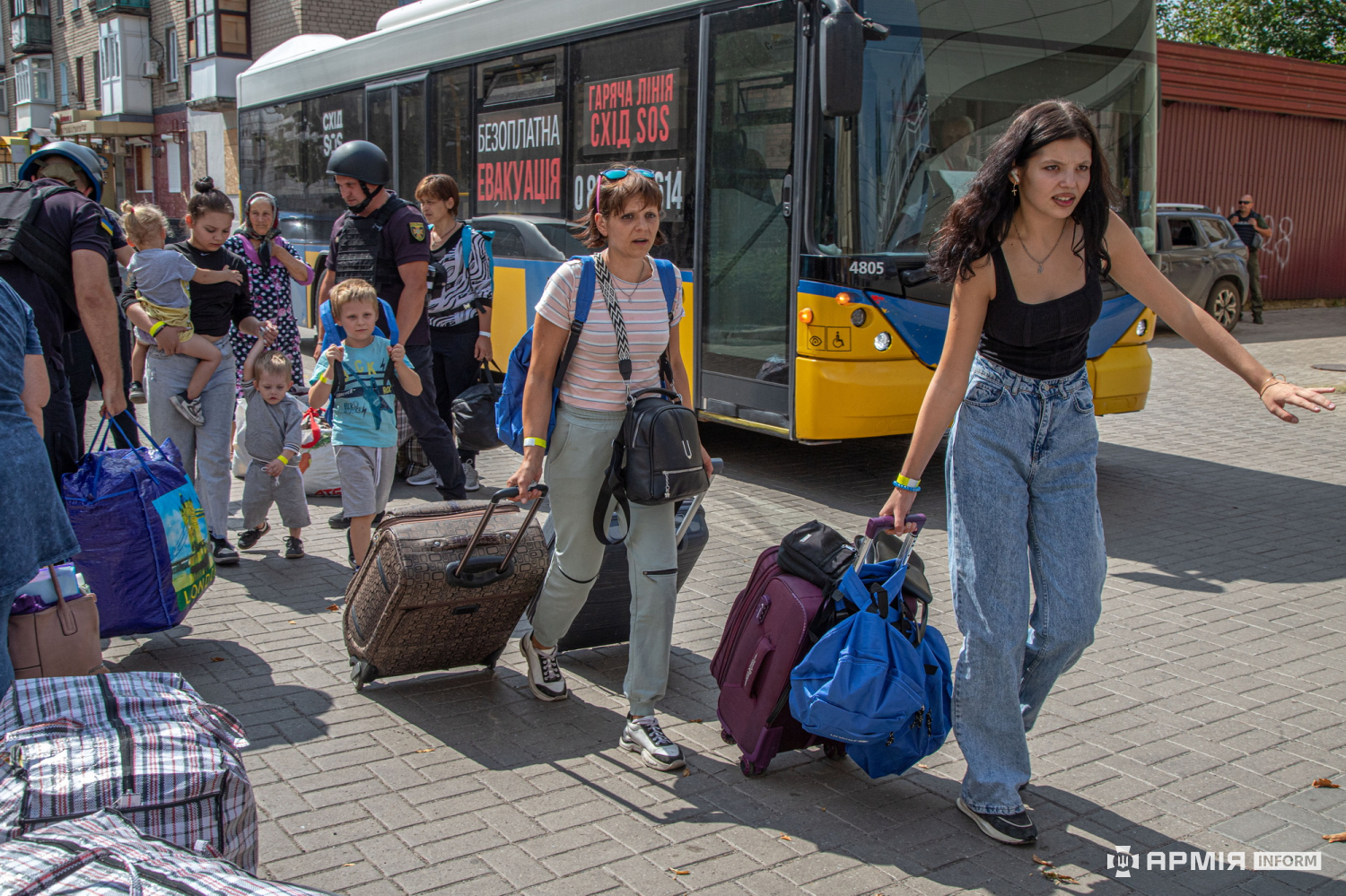
Evacuation from Pokrovsk (Donetsk Oblast) as a result of the advance of the Russian army

Four members of the same family were killed in a Russian airstrike in Izmailivka, Donetsk Oblast. Two people were killed in a separate attack in Chasiv Yar.

Ukraine announced that it will cease the transit of Russian gas and oil to Europe via the Druzhba pipeline once the current contract expires on 1 January 2025.

Vasily Golubev, governor of Rostov Oblast, claimed that four Ukrainian drones were destroyed. A local Russian Telegram channel reported that three storage tanks at an oil depot in Kamensk-Shakhtinsky had been set on fire. The governor of Voronezh Oblast, Alexander Gusev, said that falling debris from a downed drone started a fire "near explosive objects." Russian military officials claimed that eight drones were downed. Two settlements were evacuated. The governor of Kirov Oblast, Alexander Sokolov, claimed that drones attacked the town of Kotelnich in the first attack of its kind in the region.

The Ukrainian military claimed to have shot down a Russian Su-25 aircraft over the Kramatorsk sector.

=== 29 August ===
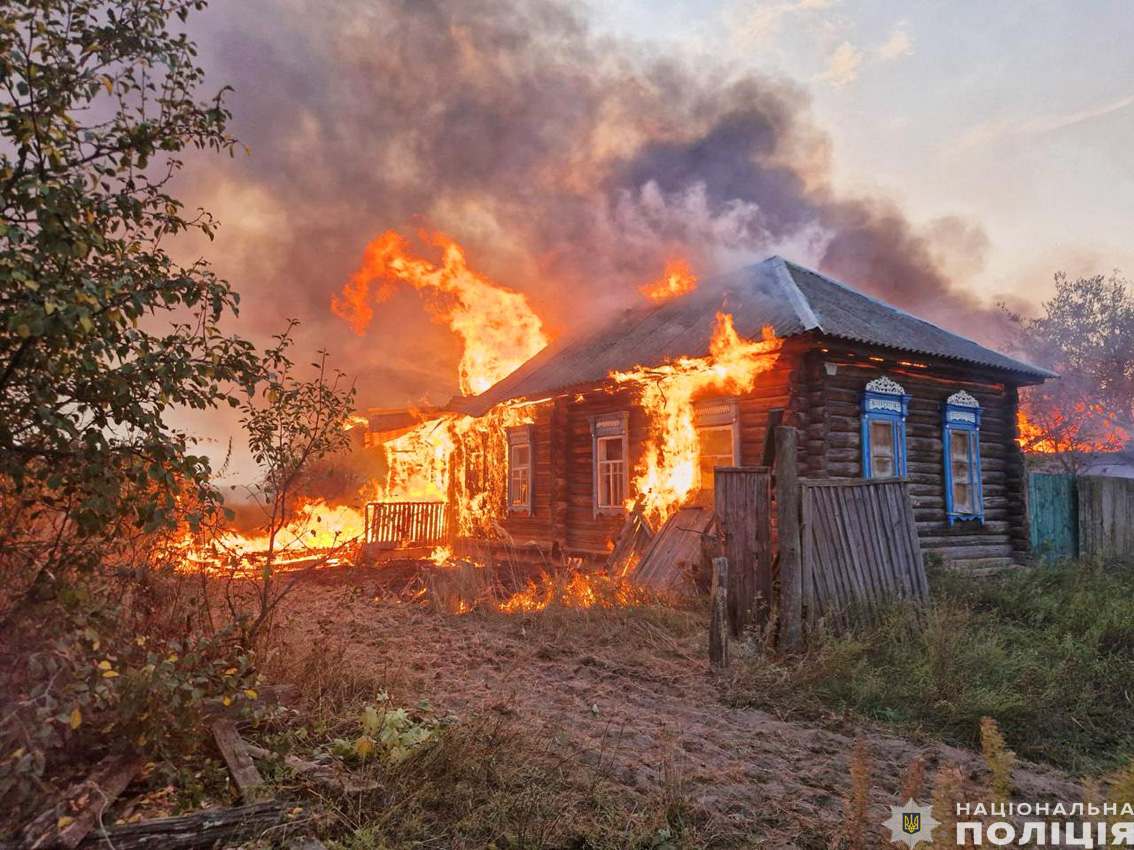
House in Chernihiv Oblast after shelling on 29 August

Ukraine claimed to have shot down two of five Russian missiles and 60 of 74 drones. Ukraine lost track of 14 drones. One is believed to have entered Belarusian airspace. The Belarusian Air Force, for the first time, claimed to have shot down a Russian drone. Falling debris damaged homes in Kyiv Oblast and started a large fire in Cherkasy.

The Ukrainian military said that Russian forces were in partial control over Chasiv Yar, adding that the city was now destroyed.

The governor of Belgorod Oblast claimed that one person was killed and two others were injured by Ukrainian airstrikes in Shebekino.

=== 30 August ===
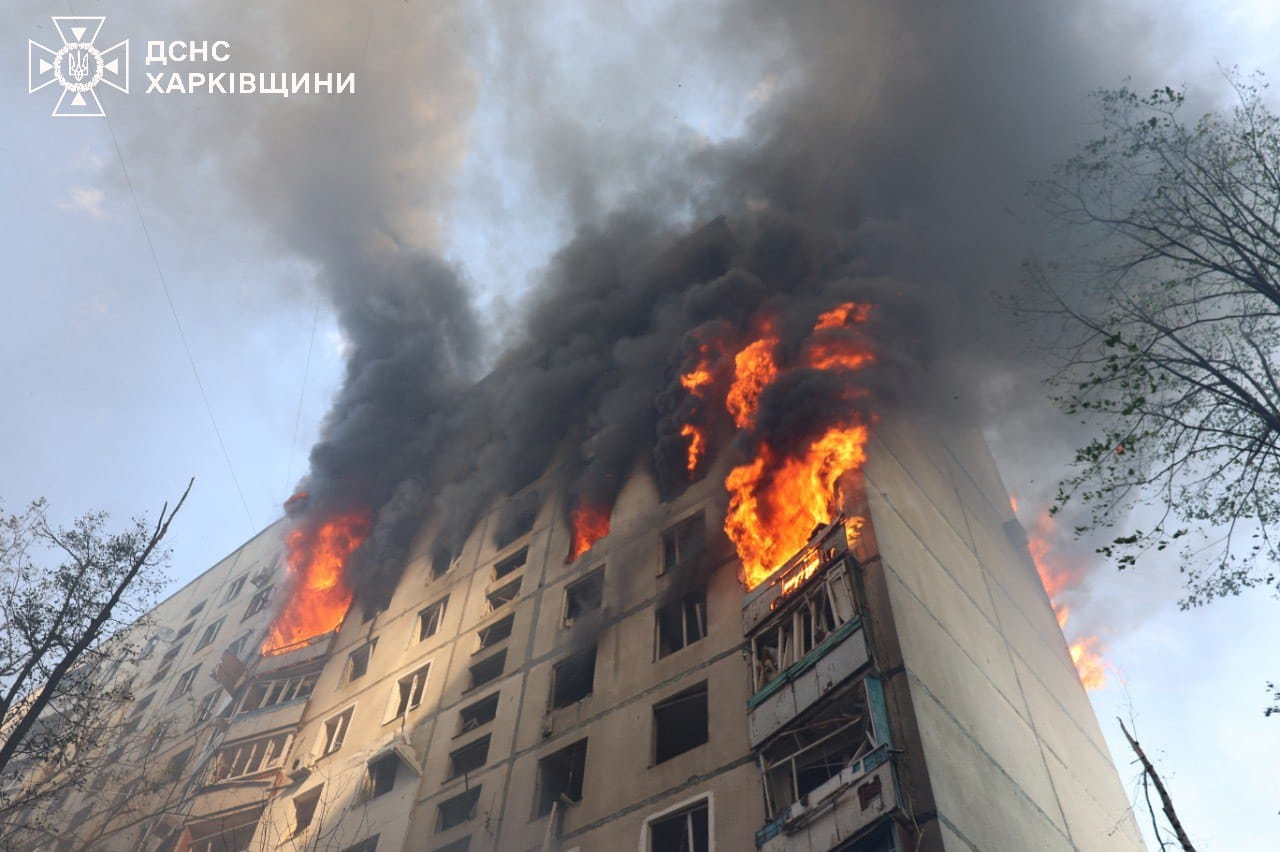
Residential building in Kharkiv after the bombing

Six people were killed and 97 others were injured in Russian airstrikes in Kharkiv. A separate attack on a factory in Sumy killed two and injured eleven.

The governor of Belgorod Oblast claimed that five people were killed and 37 others were injured by Ukrainian shelling in and around Belgorod city.

The Commander of the Ukrainian Air Force, Mykola Oleshchuk, was dismissed by President Zelenskyy and replaced by Lieutenant General Anatolii Kryvonozhko, which was partially attributed to "indications" that the F-16 that crashed on 26 August shot down by "a friendly fire incident." Ukrainian parliamentarian Maryana Bezuhla and Oleshchuk had previously argued over the cause of the loss of the F-16.

The Ukrainian Armed Forces Center for Strategic Communications announced that Ukrainian Commander-in-Chief Oleksandr Syrskyi officially appointed Roman Hladkyi as the chief of staff of the Unmanned Systems Forces.

Russian forces retook the village of Korenevo in Kursk Oblast, and captured the villages of Stelmakhivka in Luhansk Oblast and Karlivka in Donetsk Oblast.

Russia claimed to have shot down 18 drones over Crimea and in Bryansk, Kaluga, and Belgorod Oblasts, adding that Kaluga Airport was also targeted.

Italian Foreign Minister Antonio Tajani said that Ukraine did not have permission to strike Russian territory with Italian weapons. He also announced that Italy was sending a new Samp-T to Ukraine.

Russia began withdrawing 100 members of the Bear Brigade, a Russian private military company, from Burkina Faso to Kursk Oblast to fight Ukrainian forces.

The FSB announced the arrest by Venezuela of two Colombian nationals who had been fighting with the international legion of Ukraine during a lay-over in Caracas in mid-July and were then extradited to Russia.

=== 31 August ===
Five people were killed by Russian shelling in Chasiv Yar. One person was killed in a separate attack in Sumy Oblast.

Ukrainian shelling killed five and injured 46 in Belgorod.

== September 2024 ==
=== 1 September ===
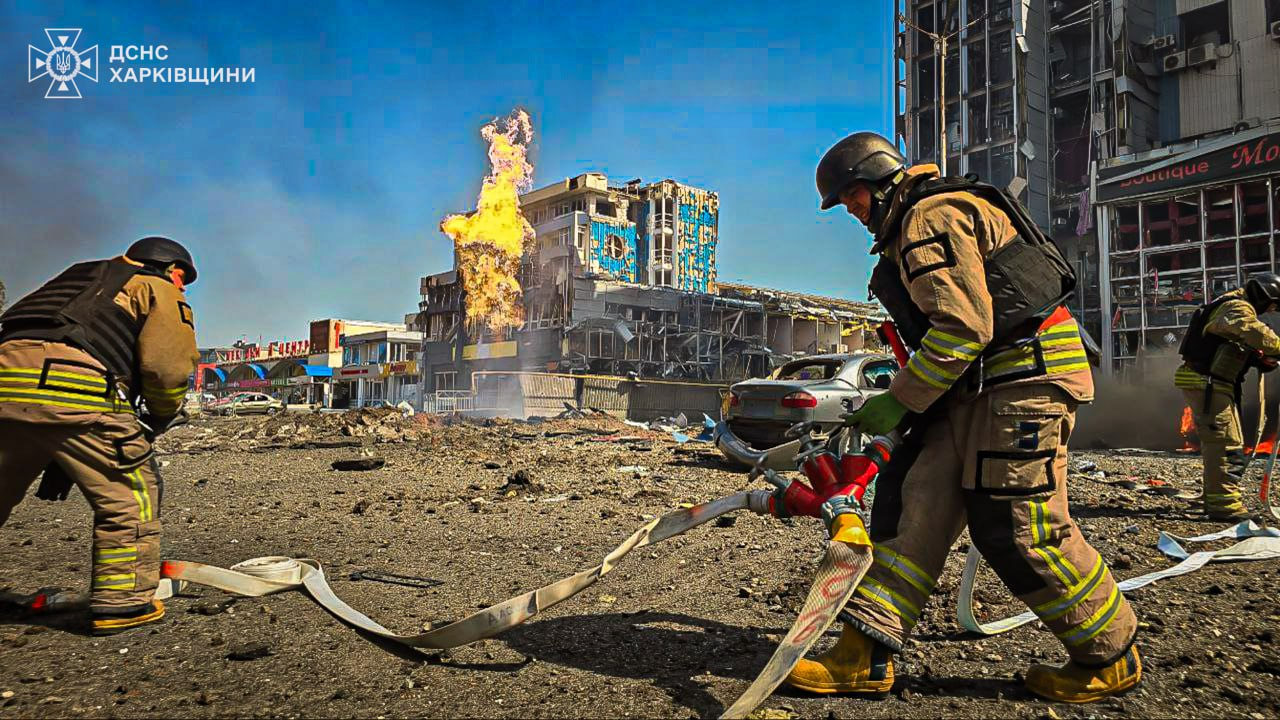
Destructions in Kharkiv after the attack

Russia claimed to have shot down 158 drones over Moscow, Tver, Voronezh, Tula, Kaluga, Bryansk, Belgorod, Lipetsk, and Kursk Oblasts following a massive drone attack by Ukraine. Fires were started at the Moscow Refinery, which is owned by Gazprom Neft, and Konakovo Power Station in Tver Oblast, one of central Russia's biggest power plants. Flights from Domodedovo and Zhukovsky airports were suspended.

Russia likely captured the villages of Mykhailivka and Dolynivka, southeast of Pokrovsk. Russia later confirmed that it had taken Mykhailivka on 13 October.

Three people were killed in Russian attacks in Sumy, Donetsk, and Kherson Oblasts, while another 13 people were injured at an orphanage and rehabilitation centre in Sumy city. Another three people were killed in a separate attack in Kurakhove. Forty-seven people were injured in Russian airstrikes in Kharkiv.

Ukraine imposed sanctions on 150 individuals and entities associated with the Russian aviation industry.

=== 2 September ===
Three people were killed in Russian attacks on Dnipro and Zaporizhzhia.

=== 3 September ===
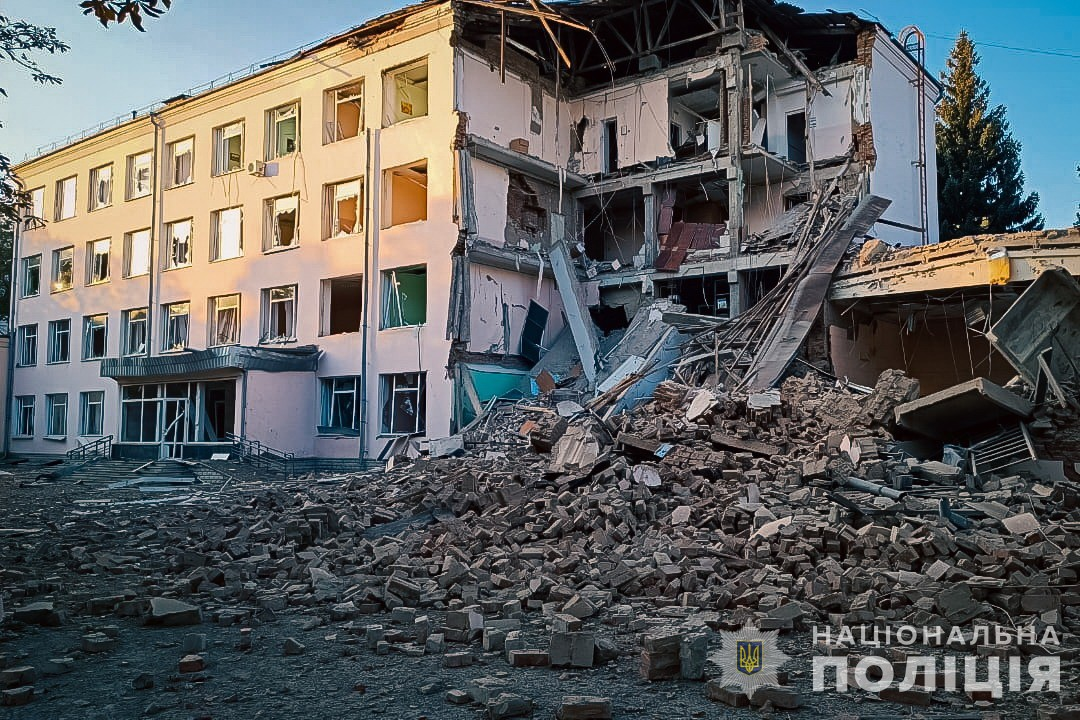
One of buildings of Sumy State University after bombing on 3 September

At least 58 people were killed and 328 others were injured in a Russian missile attack on Poltava.

Russia likely seized the village of Halytsynivka, southeast of Pokrovsk.

A court in Rostov-on-Don sentenced a Ukrainian soldier who had been captured while taking part in an amphibious operation in Crimea in 2023 to 20 years' imprisonment.

=== 4 September ===
Destructions in Lviv after the attack

At least seven people were killed and 64 others were injured in a Russian air attack on Lviv.

Russian-installed officials in Donetsk Oblast claimed that three people were killed and five others were injured by Ukrainian shelling on a market in Donetsk city, adding that one person was injured in a separate drone attack.

German Chancellor Olaf Scholz announced that his country had ordered some 17 IRIS-T missile systems for Ukraine.

=== 5 September ===
President Zelenskyy claimed that 60,000 Russian troops had been redeployed from Zaporizhzhia and Kherson Oblasts to Kursk Oblast and that the number of Russian shells fired in the former areas had been reduced. In a separate interview, General Syrskyi claimed that Russian forces were unable to advance in the Pokrovsk sector in the past six days.

Russia was visually confirmed to have captured Prechystivka, west of Vuhledar.

Ukrainian authorities cancelled evacuations by train from the Pokrovsk railway station, citing security concerns.

=== 6 September ===
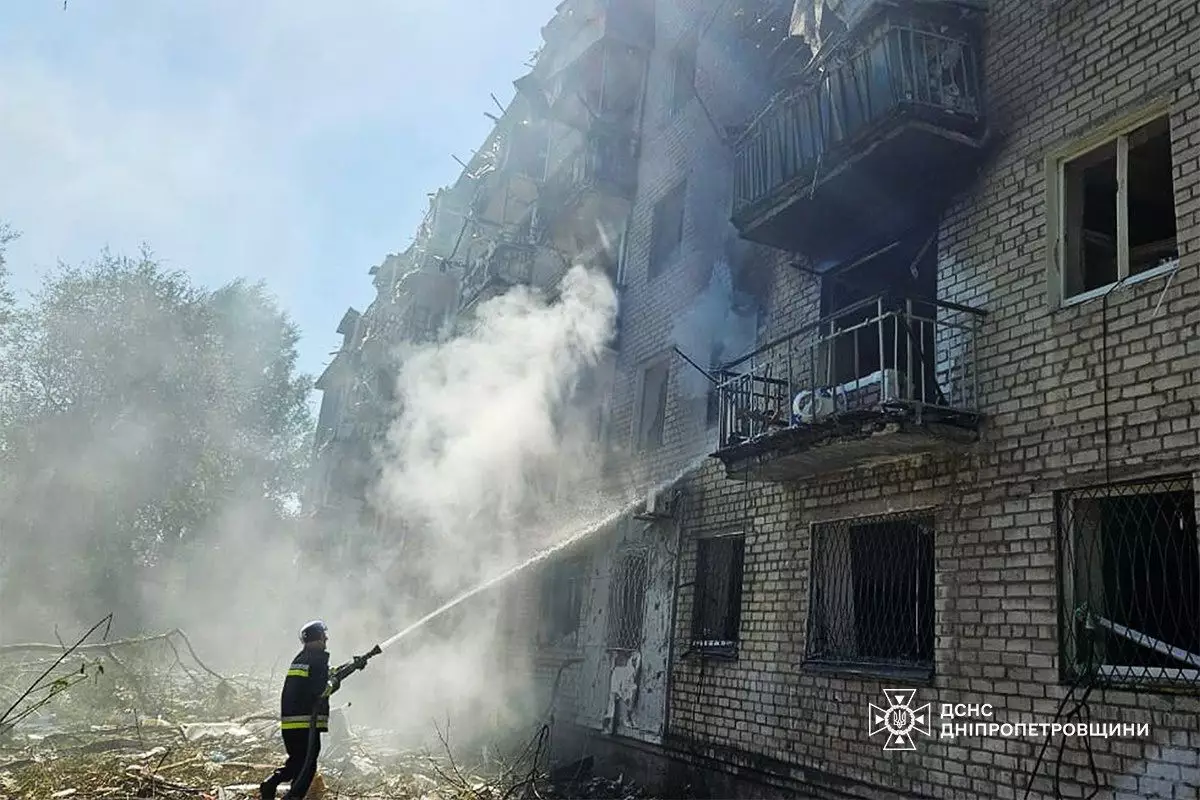
Destructions in Pavlohrad after the attack

The Azov Brigade claimed to have retaken parts of Niu York and relieved trapped Ukrainian units in the area.

Russia advanced into the southern areas of the village of Synkivka in eastern Kharkiv Oblast, potentially taking control of the settlement.

One person was killed and 64 others were injured in a Russian attack on Pavlohrad. One person was killed in a separate attack in Krasnopillia, Sumy Oblast.

The United Kingdom promised to deliver some 650 Lightweight Multirole Missiles to Ukraine. Canada pledged some 80,840 CRV-7 motors, 1,300 CRV-7 warheads, 970 surplus machine guns, 10,500 9 mm pistols, 29 M113 APC, 64 Coyote LAVs and funds to train Ukrainian pilots. Germany's Defence Minister Boris Pistorius announced that Ukraine would receive 77 Leopard 1A5 "as quickly as possible" from Germany and other European allies along with 12 Panzerhaubitze 2000. Denmark pledged 80 million euros for maintenance and weapons for Ukrainian F-16s. Spain also announced that it would immediately ship a "complete HAWK battery" to Ukraine.

The Ukrainian Air Force released footage of an Su-24M carrying what appears to be an analog to the Russian UMPK (bomb kit).

=== 7 September ===
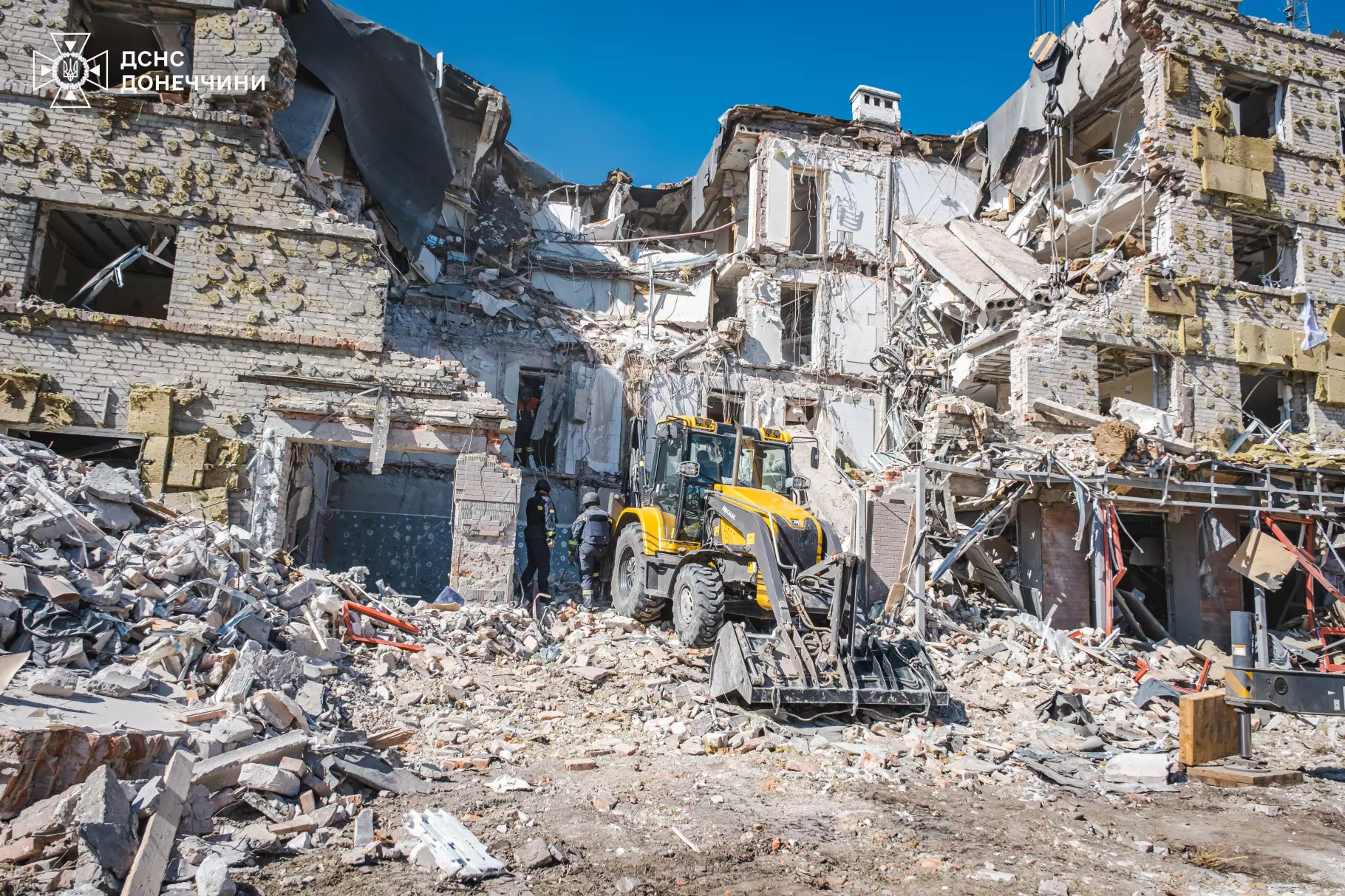
Hotel in Mykolaivka (Donetsk Oblast) after an airstrike on 7 September

Russia launched a massive air attack on 11 regions of Ukraine, with drone debris found beside the Verkhovna Rada building in Kyiv. The Ukrainian Air Force claimed to have shot down 58 of 67 drones launched.

Three people were killed by Russian shelling in Kostiantynivka.

Drones attacked a building in the Ostrogozhsky district of Voronezh Oblast in Russia. According to the Oblast Governor, Aleksandr Gusev, falling debris set fire to "explosive objects" leading to detonations that forced the evacuation of nearby settlements. The SBU later confirmed that a "large ammunition and equipment depot" had been "lost".

In Kursk Oblast, Ukrainian forces claimed to have destroyed two pontoon bridges over the Seym River and an Osa air defence system using SDB bombs and HIMARS rockets.

=== 8 September ===
Two people were killed in a Russian airstrike on Sumy. One person was killed in a separate attack in Derhachi.

Russian forces captured the village of Vodiane, five kilometers from Vuhledar.

A Ukrainian drone struck a fuel tank near Volokonovka, Belgorod Oblast. The oblast governor Vyacheslav Gladkov also later claimed drones damaged residential houses and cars in three other settlements.

Ukrainian military commander Oleksandr Syrskyi claimed that Russian forces fired two to two and half shells to every Ukrainian shell fired, a decrease from the 6-10:1 ratio in 2023.

Russian drones entered both Romanian and Latvian airspace. Romania scrambled two F-16s to monitor a drone which landed "in an uninhabited area" near Periprava, according to the Romanian Ministry of Defence. The drone that entered Latvian airspace from Belarus crashed near Rēzekne.

=== 9 September ===
Russia captured the city of Krasnohorivka, 20 kilometres from Donetsk. It formally claimed to have seized the settlement the next day, along with Hryhorivka and Halytsynivka. Russia also captured the town of Memryk, 20 kilometers from Pokrovsk.

One person was killed by Russian shelling in Nikopol.

Sweden announced its 17th aid package for Ukraine amounting to 4.6 billion Swedish crowns or $443 million. Funds were for various kinds of ammunition, patrol boats, missiles and funds to "facilitate a transfer of Gripen fighter jets in the future".

Ukraine announced the domestic production of analogs of Soviet-era hand grenades such as the F-1 and RGD-5.

Ukraine's military claimed that Russian forces used chemical weapons 447 times, against Ukrainian soldiers, during August 2024, in violation of Convention on the Prohibition of the Chemical Weapons Convention.

=== 10 September ===
Russia claimed to have shot down 144 drones over nine regions, with some 20 over Moscow Oblast and 72 over Bryansk Oblast. A woman died after being struck by falling debris which hit an apartment block, another three were injured and three flats were set on fire in Ramenskoye, Moscow Oblast. The Governor of Moscow Oblast claimed at least two high rise apartment buildings were damaged by drones. Around 30 flights to Moscow were suspended.

The Russian military launched a counteroffensive in Kursk Oblast, reportedly retaking the settlements of Gordeyevka and Vnezapnoye.

A Russian Su-30SM was lost off Crimea, with the HUR claiming that it was shot down by Ukrainian forces. The crew was believed to have died.

The HUR and Ukrainian special forces claimed to have placed explosives on a Russian railway in Belgorod Oblast, derailing a freight train consisting of eleven cars and a locomotive engine.

=== 11 September ===
Three people were killed in Russian attacks in Kostiantynivka.

Russia claimed to have repelled an attempt by Ukrainian forces to retake the Krym-2 drilling rig in the Black Sea.

In Russia, drone attacks were reported in Murmansk Oblast, prompting flight restrictions in Murmansk city and Apatity. The Regional Governor Andrey Chibis claimed that three drones were shot down, having travelled over some 1,600 kilometres from Ukraine.

=== 12 September ===
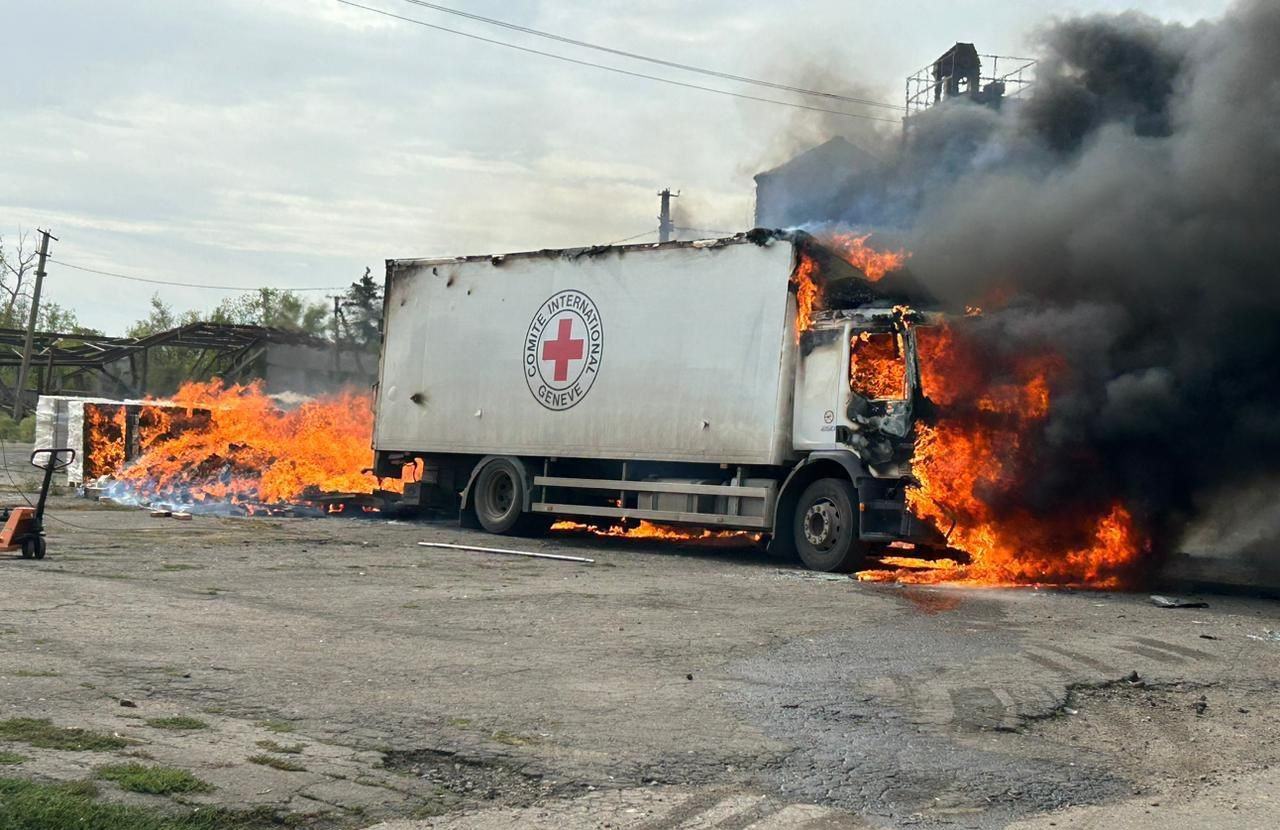
Attacked truck of the Red Cross in Viroliubivka (Donetsk Oblast)

Three employees of the International Committee of the Red Cross were killed by Russian shelling in Viroliubivka, outside Kostiantynivka, while two people were killed in a separate attack in Borova. Fourteen people were injured in a Russian drone attack on electrical infrastructure in Konotop.

Around 120 miners were reported trapped beneath the Dobropillia mine in Donetsk Oblast due to a power outage caused by Russian attacks.

A cargo ship carrying Ukrainian wheat bound for Egypt was struck by a Russian missile inside Romania's exclusive economic zone in the Black Sea without causing casualties.

Russian forces captured the town of Lisivka in Donetsk Oblast.

Ukrainian authorities arrested five people on suspicion of burning Ukrainian military vehicles on behalf of Russia.

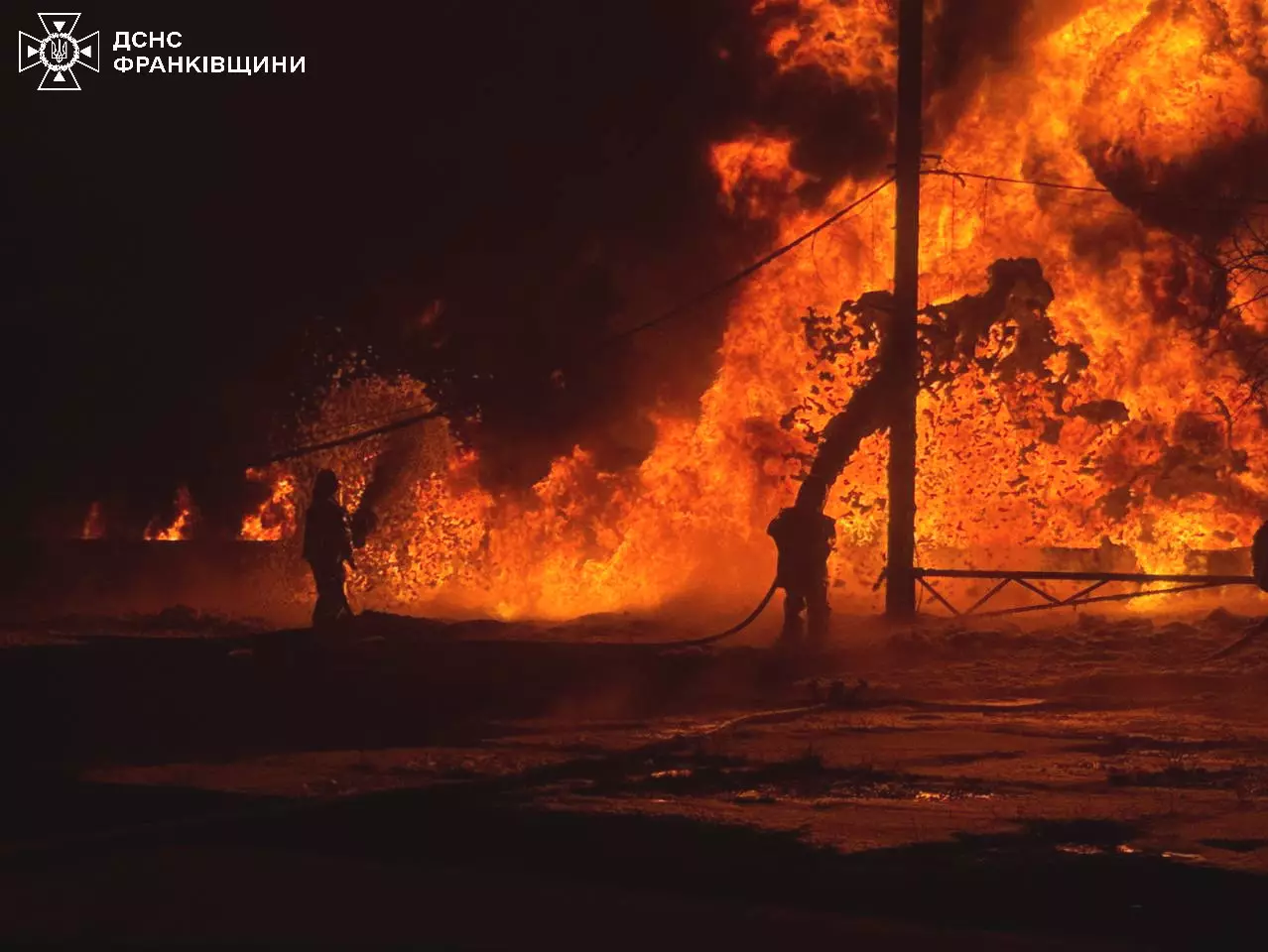
Infrastructure facility in Ivano-Frankivsk Oblast after Russian drone attack on 13 September

=== 13 September ===
Forty-nine Ukrainian civilians and soldiers were swapped for the same number of Russians, the 56th prisoner swap between the two countries.

Russian glide bombs killed two and wounded six in Yampil, Sumy Oblast.

Russian forces claimed to have recovered 10 settlements from Ukrainian control in Kursk Oblast. Zelenskyy acknowledged the counter-attack but claimed Russia thus far has "seen no serious success".

=== 14 September ===
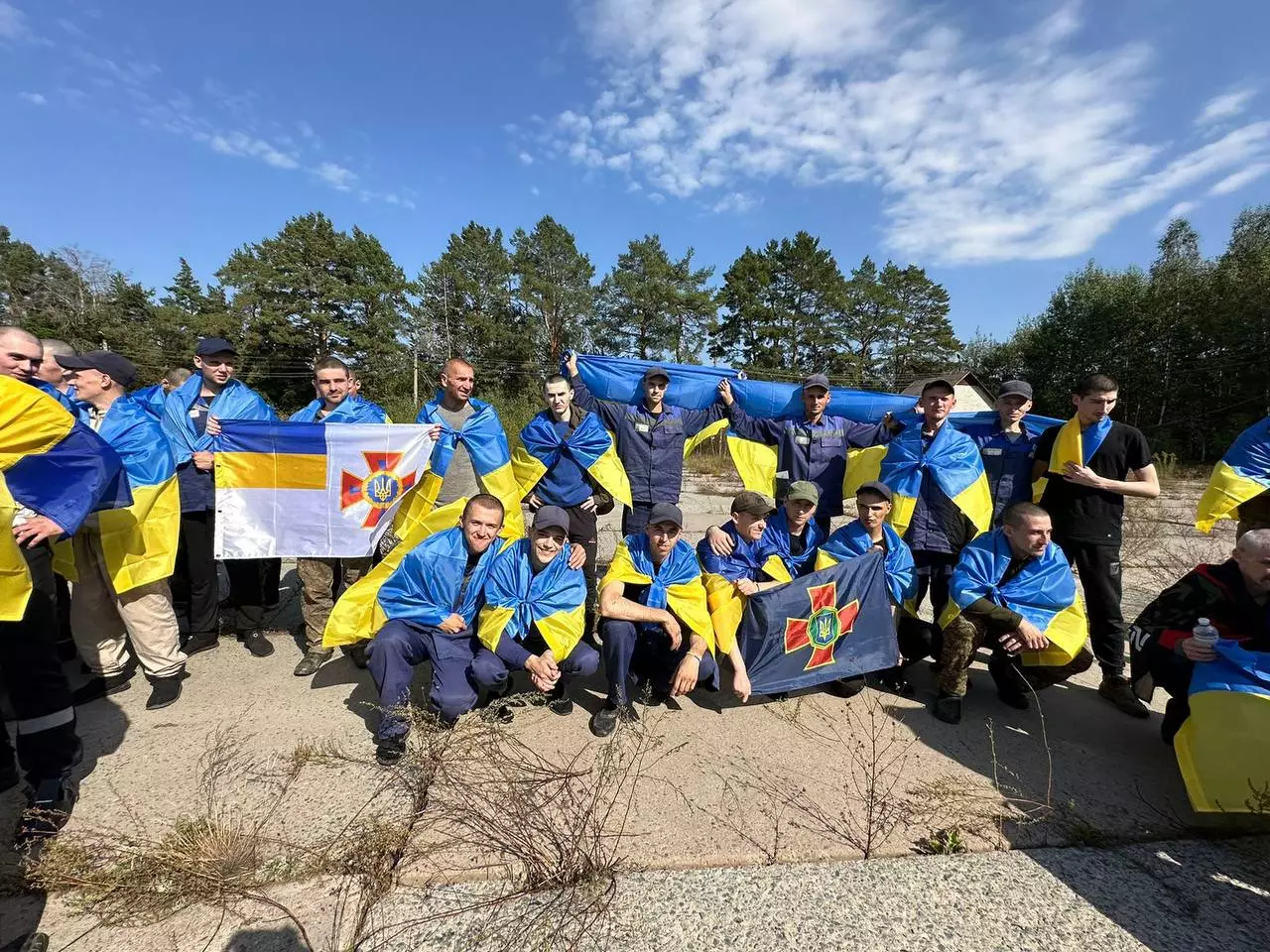
Ukrainian soldiers, released during the exchange

Russia and Ukraine each both exchanged 103 prisoners, a total of 206 Ukrainian and Russian POWs, in a swap organised by the UAE.

Three people were killed in a Russian attack on Huliaipole.

=== 15 September ===
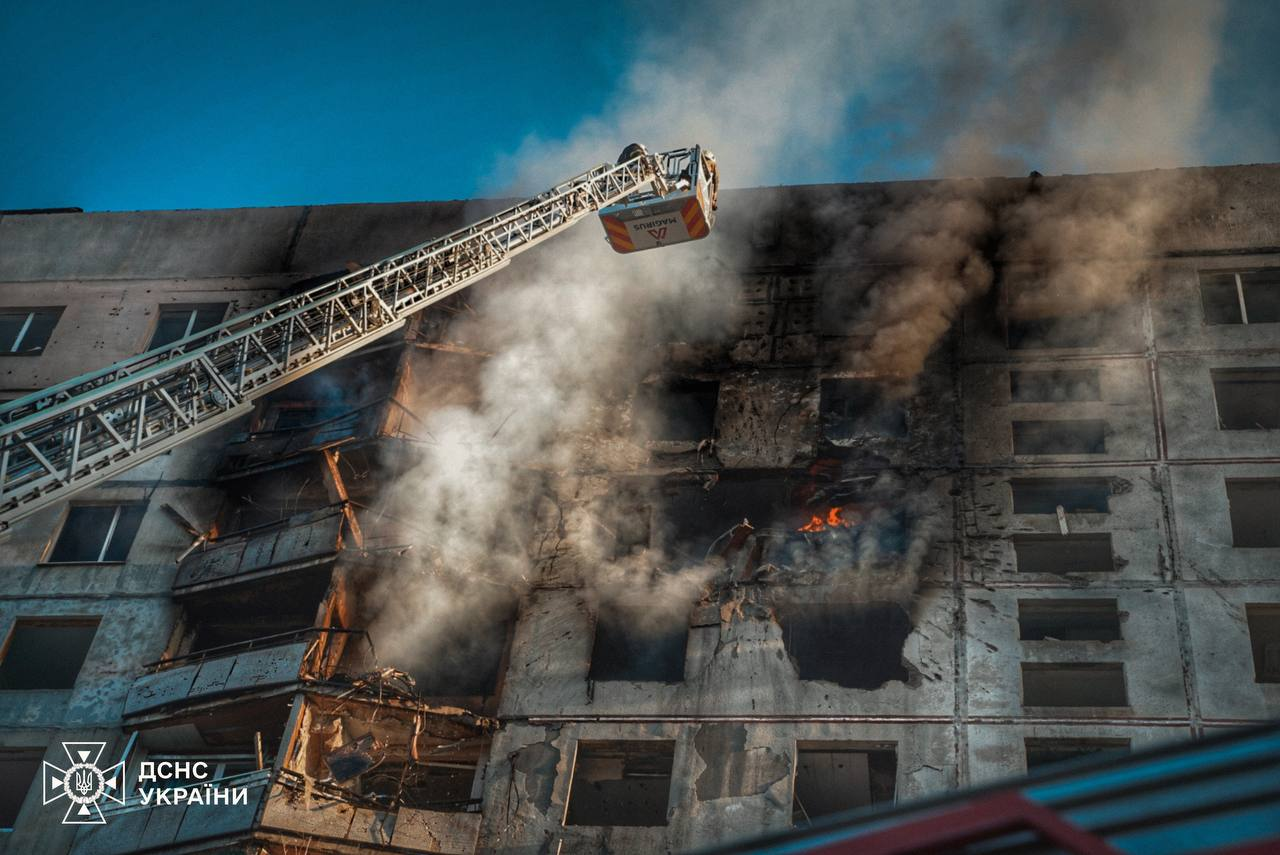
Residential building in Kharkiv after the bombing

Two people were killed in a Russian missile attack on Odesa, while one person was killed by shelling in Pokrovsk. One person was killed while 42 others were injured in a Russian missile strike in Kharkiv.

Russia claimed to have shot down 29 drones over Bryansk, Kursk, Smolensk, Oryol, Belgorod, Kaluga, and Rostov oblasts.

Ukraine claimed Air Force bombing and HIMARS strikes destroyed six Russian positions in Kursk Oblast, including a command post and pontoon bridge.

Ukraine announced that it had begun producing 155 mm artillery shells.

Qatar exchanged 12 PzH 2000s for RCH 155s with Germany; Germany said that these PzH 2000s will be donated to Ukraine.

Ukraine will extend the basic training of its conscripts from three months to a longer, but unspecified period of time, after repeated complaints about the effectiveness of newly recruited Ukrainian soldiers. The new basic training program will start in October–November, according to the Ukrainian military commander Colonel-General Oleksandr Syrskyi.

HUR indicated that it killed Aleksandr Korobov, a journalist for Russia-1, in Belgorod. Russian sources denied his death, saying that he was badly injured and in hospital.

=== 16 September ===
In Russia, the governor of Belgorod Oblast claimed that eight people were injured in a Ukrainian missile strike in Belgorod city.

Russia claimed to have recaptured the villages of Uspenovka and Borki in Kursk Oblast.

=== 17 September ===
Two people were killed in a Russian attack on Komyshuvakha, Zaporizhzhia Oblast.

The Ukrainian Navy claimed to have destroyed Russian ammunition depots near Mariupol following missile strikes.

Russian forces captured the city of Ukrainsk, southeast of Pokrovsk.

The FSB claimed to have killed a Russian citizen suspected of plotting the assassination of a defense industry executive in Sverdlovsk Oblast on behalf of the HUR.

A photo was released reportedly showing a Ukrainian prisoner of war being killed with a sword marked "For Kursk" in Novohrodivka, Donetsk Oblast. Ukraine's Ombudsman Dmytro Lubinets called upon international authorities to respond to the incident.

Explosions were reported at the Engels-2 air base of an "unknown origin". However, the air defences around Kursk and Bryansk Oblasts were active at the time, indicating the possible presence of Ukrainian drones.

Footage was released from an unknown date showing the aftermath of a HIMARS strike on a Russian training ground near the Donetsk ring road. The video claimed that there were "dozens of dead" or 50 casualties.

=== 18 September ===
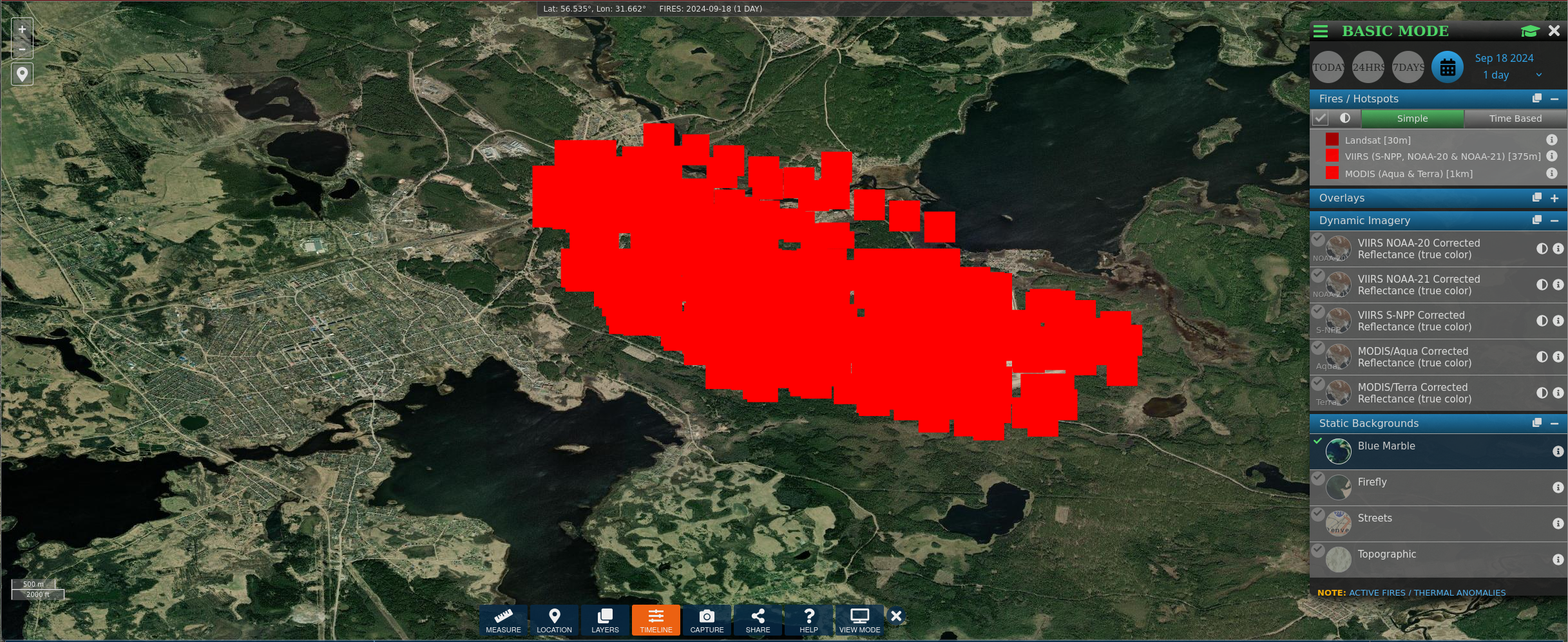
NASA's FIRMS imagery from 18 September 2024 of the multiple fires East of Toropets

Ukrainian drones struck a major GRAU ammunition depot in Toropets, Tver Oblast, causing a fire and evacuations. Seven drones were reported destroyed in Smolensk Oblast, fourteen in Bryansk Oblast, and others in Oryol and Tula Oblasts. The explosion in Toropets resulted in a small earthquake and NASA satellites detected the fire from space. According to Reuters, the blast was equivalent to 200-240 tons of high explosives detonating. The SBU claimed that "Iskander, Tochka and KAB missiles" were stored at the facility. Ukraine is believed to have used the Palianytsia missile/drone.

Apti Alaudinov stated that Russia had regained control over the settlements of Nikolaeva-Darino and Darino in the Sudzhansky District.

One person was killed in a Russian drone strike in Nikopol.

Italy announced that it would deliver a second SAMP/T missile system to Ukraine by the end of September.

=== 19 September ===
Sumy geriatric boarding house after the bombing

One person was killed in a Russian attack in Sumy.

The EU provided Ukraine with 160 million euros taken from Russian assets frozen by the bloc. The money was allocated for the repair of Ukrainian electrical infrastructure damaged by Russia.

The Verkhovna Rada voted to rename 327 settlements that bear Soviet or Russian names.

=== 20 September ===
An Antigua and Barbuda-flagged vessel was damaged in a Russian missile attack on Odesa that also injured four people.

Ukraine imposed sanctions on 46 foreign individuals and entities for their role in supporting the Russian war effort in Ukraine.

The Ukrainian government banned civil servants, military personnel and workers in critical industries from installing Telegram on government-issued devices, citing cybersecurity risks coming from Russia.

The Australian government was seeking permission from the United States government to send 59 of its "mothballed" M1A1 tanks to Ukraine, according to The Sydney Morning Herald.

Ursula von der Leyen, European Commission president, announced a €35bn loan to Ukraine from the EU during a visit to Kyiv. It is part of a $50bn loan that G7 countries previously agreed to, funded by proceeds from frozen Russian assets. The remaining amount of the loan will be paid to Ukraine by non-EU countries. Von der Leyen said it was up to the Ukrainian government how to "best use the funds".

A Russian milblogger revealed that Russia formed a mechanised battalion using crew from the Russian aircraft carrier Admiral Kuznetsov. It was initially deployed in Kharkiv but later sent to Pokrovsk.

=== 21 September ===
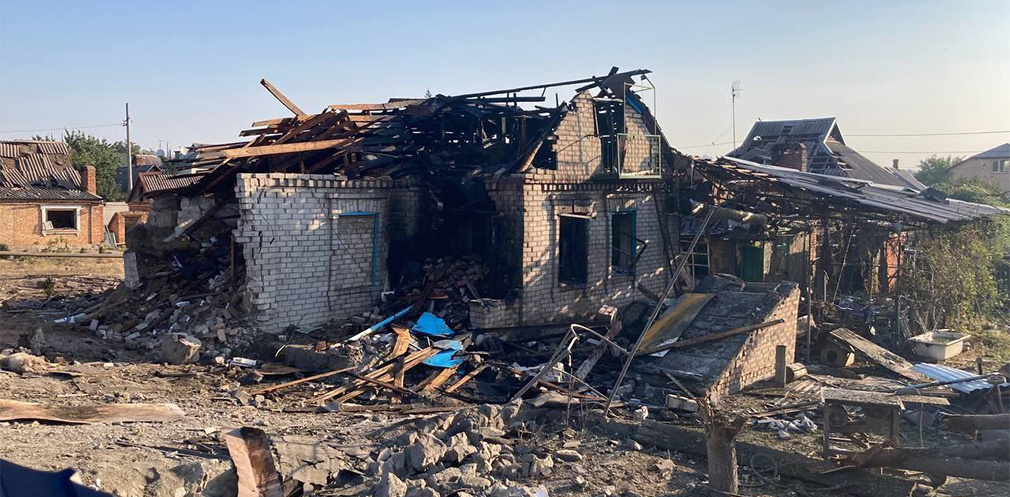
House in Kryvyi Rih after the attack

Three people were killed in a Russian missile attack on Kryvyi Rih. Two people were killed in a drone strike in Nikopol.

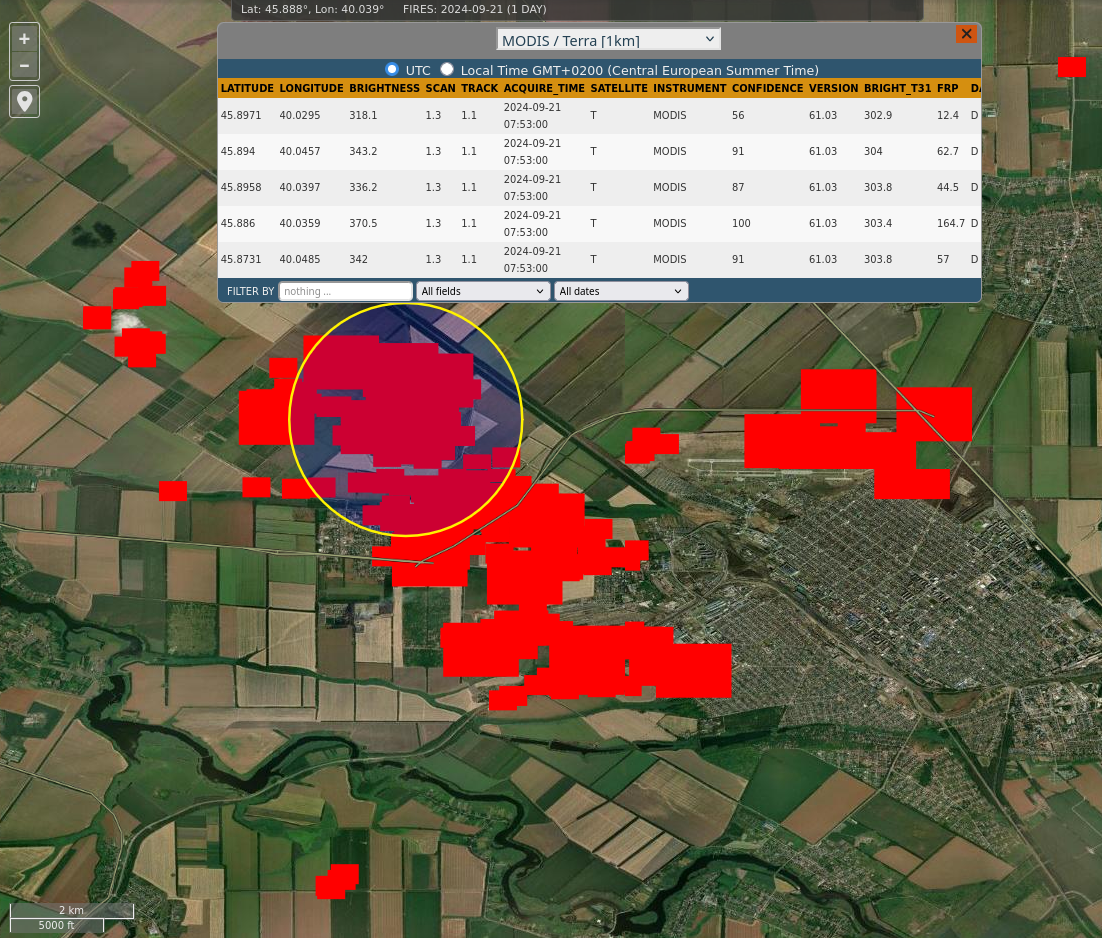
21 September 2024 FIRMS imagery shows fires from the rail yard west of Tikhoretsk to the 719th GRAU arsenal to the northwest and at the airbase north of the town

In Russia, a drone strike caused an explosion at the 719th GRAU arsenal in Tikhoretsk, Krasnodar Krai with subsequent fires also affecting the nearby Tikhoretsk air base. The 23rd GRAU arsenal near the village of Oktyabrskoye, Tver Oblast was attacked by Ukrainian drones. A section of the M-9 highway was closed and nearby settlements were evacuated. Overall, Russia claimed to have shot down 101 drones over the west of the country. Ukraine is believed to have used the Palianytsia missile/drone.

=== 22 September ===
Two people were killed by Russian shelling in Donetsk Oblast.

=== 23 September ===
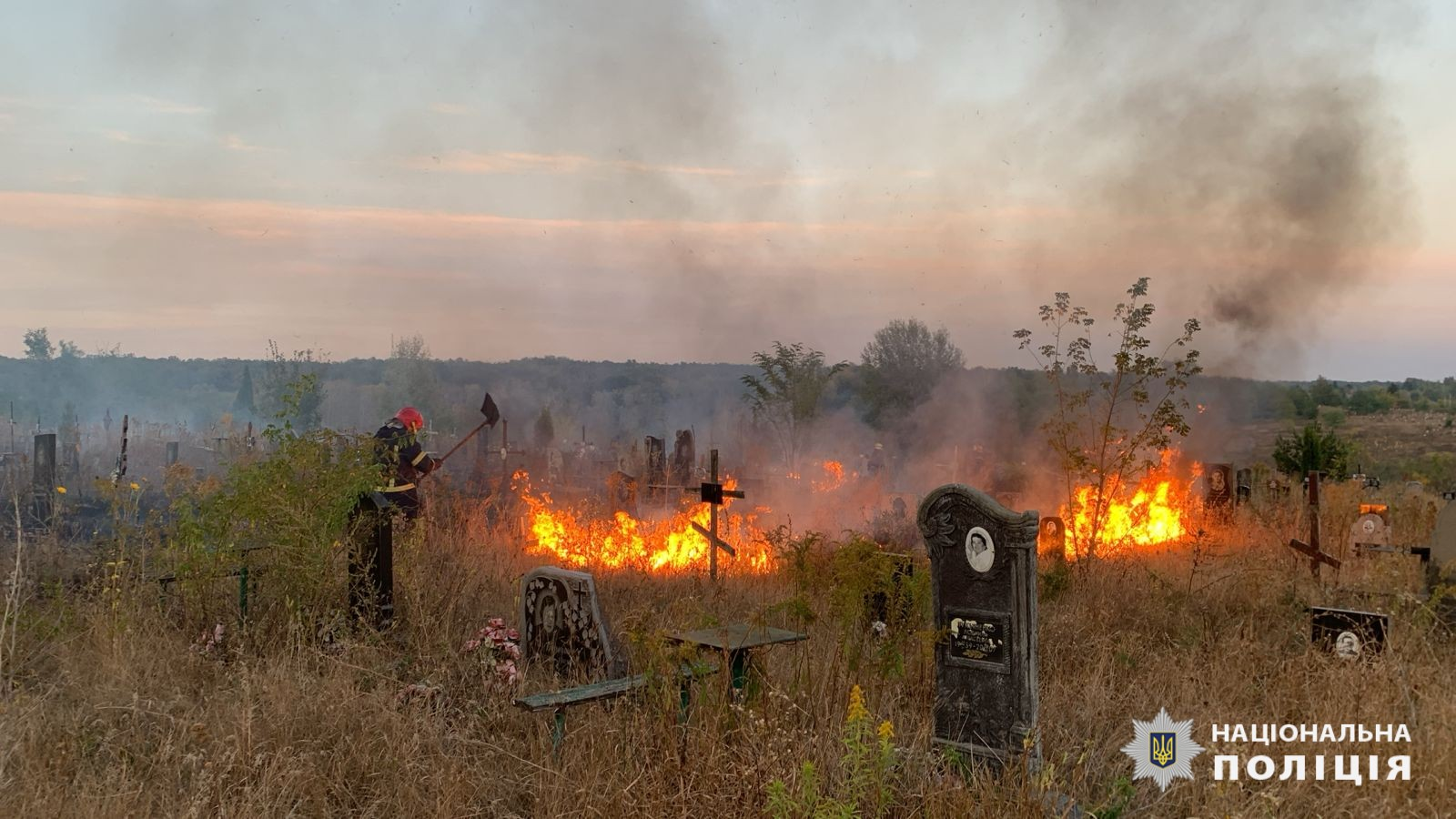
Cemetery in Tsyrkuny (Kharkiv region) after bombing

One person was killed by Russian shelling in Kramatorsk. One person was killed in a separate attack in Zaporizhzhia.

A Russian S-300 missile system was destroyed by drones near Dzhankoy, Crimea.

The SBU claimed to have arrested two members of a "combat group" who were plotting to seize government buildings in Odesa on behalf of Russia.

The Russian military started using Chinese made ZFB-05 armoured vehicles in Ukraine.

=== 24 September ===
Vovchansk Aggregate Plant after the battles

Four people were killed by Russian airstrikes in Kharkiv.

Ukrainian forces retook the Vovchansk Aggregate Plant, containing 30 buildings. Ukrainian forces claimed to have captured 20 Russian soldiers and killed at least four others.

=== 25 September ===
Two people were killed by Russian airstrikes in Kramatorsk.

Russia claimed to have taken the village of Hostre, 30 kilometers west of Donetsk.

European intelligence services claimed that Russia established a secret drone program, in China, for the use in Ukraine. Chinese companies are involved; however, the Chinese government may not be aware of the program.

=== 26 September ===
The US government announced a $375 million military aid package for Ukraine that included guided missiles, artillery shells, HIMARS rockets, armoured vehicles, patrol boats, spare parts and JSOW glide bombs. Later in the day, US government announced another $7.9 billion in military assistance. Much of the funds came from the Presidential Drawdown Authority that was due to expire.

=== 27 September ===
NASA's FIRMS detected extensive fire east of Tambov from 27 September 09:54:00 (UTC) until 1 October

Four people were killed in a Russian missile attack on a police station in Kryvyi Rih.

The HUR confirmed the death of Colonel Alexei Kolomeitsev in Kolomna, Moscow Oblast, and accused him of involvement in "war crimes" and training drone operators including in the use of "Shahed UAVs".

A fire broke out on the training grounds of the Russian Main Intelligence Directorate (GRU) east of Tambov, which was detected by NASA's FIRMS. Citing its status as a restricted facility, Russia's Ministry of Emergency Situations declined to comment.

=== 28 September ===
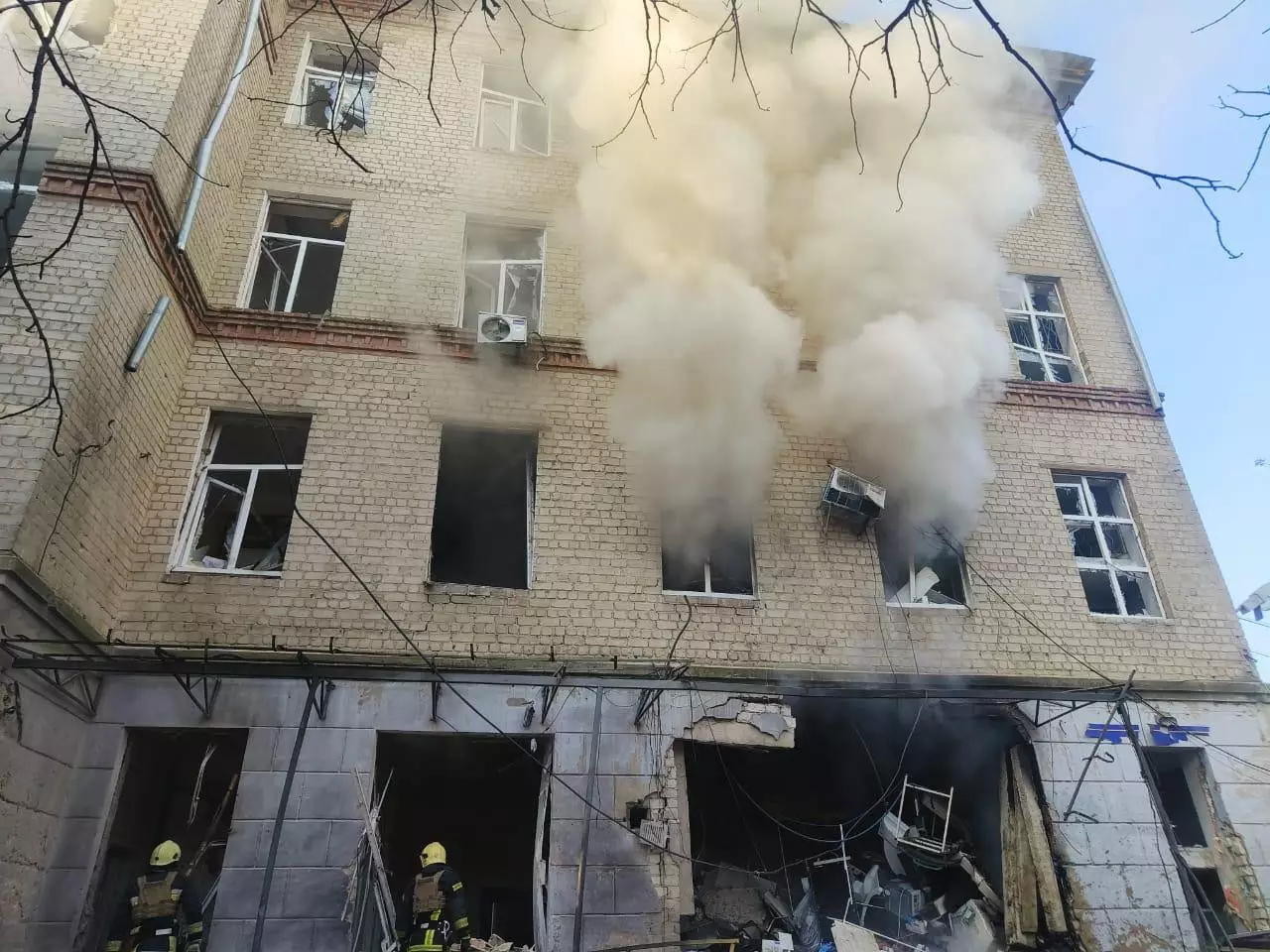
Hospital in Sumy after the attack

A Russian double tap strike on a hospital in Sumy killed ten people and injured 22 others.

Leonid Loboyko, a judge of the Supreme Court of Ukraine, was killed by a Russian FPV drone strike in Kozacha Lopan, Kharkiv Oblast. Loboyko was reportedly delivering humanitarian aid at the time. Three other locals were injured.

Three people were killed by Russian airstrikes in Slatyne, Kharkiv Oblast.

=== 29 September ===
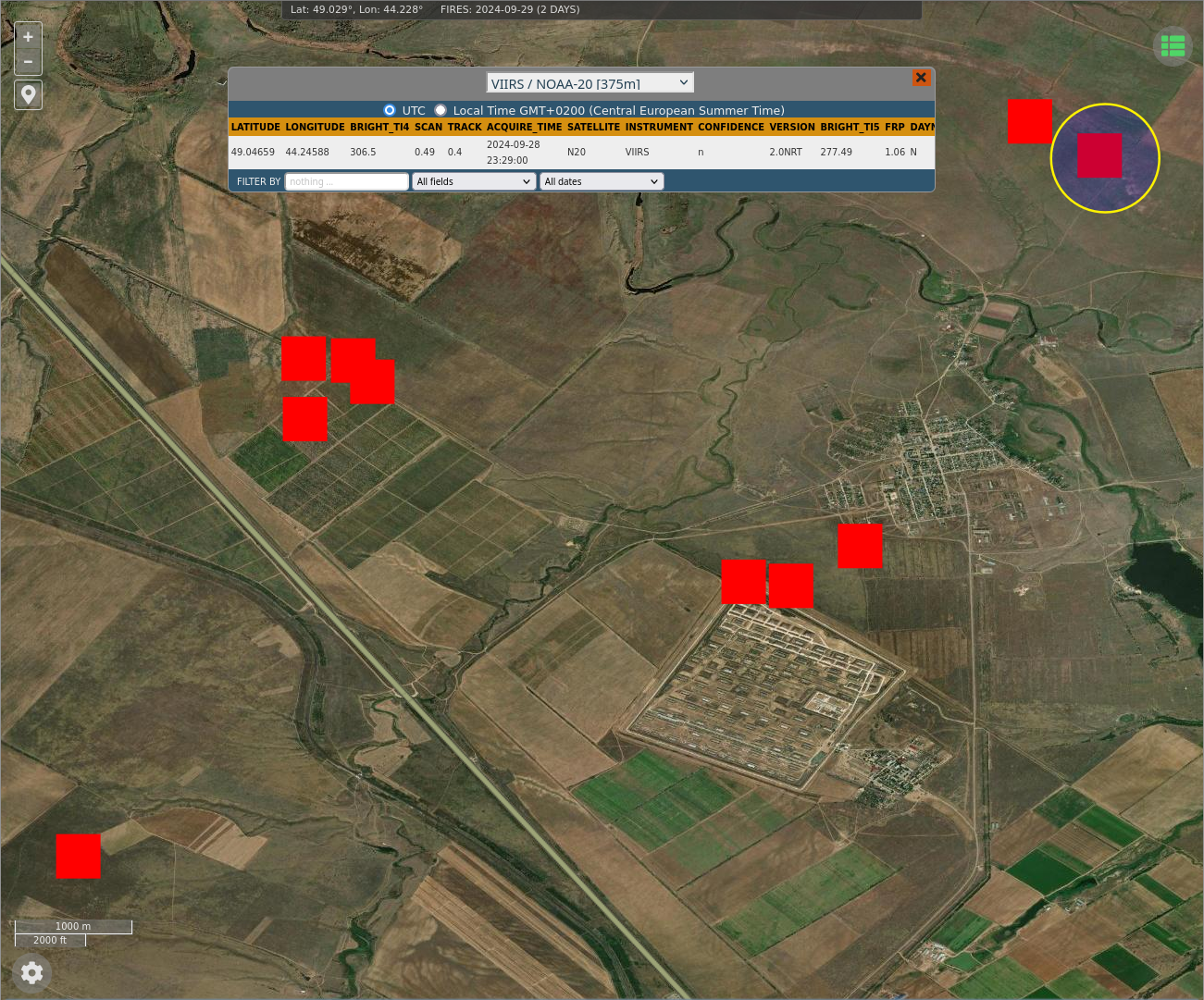
The 29 September fires near Kotluban detected by NASA's FIRMS with the first detection at 2024-09-28 23:29:00 (UTC)

Russian forces claimed to have shot down 125 drones out of some 200 in Krasnodar Krai and in Volgograd, Belgorod, Voronezh, Rostov, Bryansk, and Kursk Oblast as well as and over the Sea of Azov. Local governors reported damage but no casualties. Fires broke out in two residential buildings in Voronezh city, according to the local governor, and falling debris "sparked grass fires" in Volgograd. One attack was against an ammunition depot near Kotluban, Volgograd Oblast as reported by social media and confirmed by NASA FIRMS imagery.

Russian forces were confirmed to have captured the village of Krutyi Yar, southeast of Pokrovsk. Russia also claimed control over Makiivka in Luhansk Oblast.

It was announced that Colonel Ivan Vinnik, the commander of the Ukrainian 72nd Mechanized Brigade tasked with defending the Vuhledar sector, had been transferred from his position. He was replaced by Colonel Oleksandr Okhrimenko on 7 October following the fall of Vuhledar.

=== 30 September ===
Russia claimed to have taken the village of Nelipivka, north of Niu York.

A 72-year-old US citizen, Stephen James Hubbard, pleaded guilty in a Moscow court for being a mercenary fighting for Ukraine in the Izium front after having been arrested on 2 April 2022 by Russian forces. He was sentenced to six years and 10 months in prison on 7 October.

The Biden administration classified its Ukraine strategy despite a congressional requirement that such a strategy be made public to account for US aid to Ukraine.

A Russian court sentenced Alexander Permyakov to life in prison for a car bomb that wounded Zakhar Prilepin, a Russian nationalist writer, and killed a bodyguard in May 2023 in Nizhny Novgorod. Investigators claimed Permyakov entered Russia on a Ukrainian passport and was acting on orders from "Ukrainian special services".

The US State Department said that Ukraine "does not need permission" from the US government to launch deep strikes against targets in Russia, provided the weapons used are of Ukrainian manufacture.

== October 2024 ==
=== 1 October ===
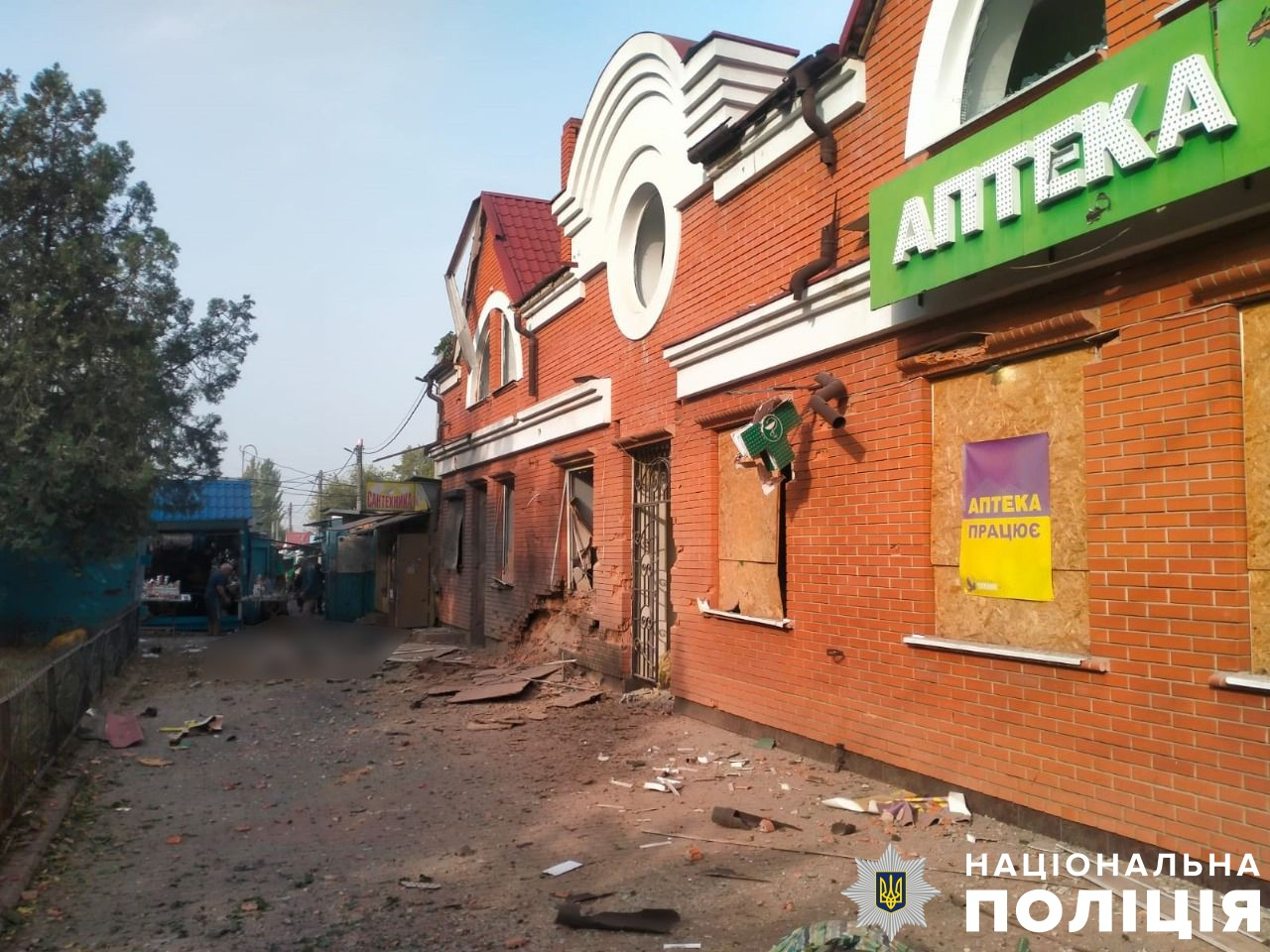
Pharmacy in Kherson after the attack

At least six people were killed by Russian shelling on a market in Kherson. One person was killed in an airstrike in Zaporizhzhia.

Russian forces captured the city of Vuhledar.

Ukrainian prosecutors accused Russian forces of summarily executing 16 POWs near Pokrovsk.

Ukrainian Defence Minister Rustem Umerov fired three of his deputies, namely Stanislav Haider, Oleksandr Serhiy and Yuriy Dzhygyr.

=== 2 October ===
The HUR claimed to have assassinated Vitalii Lomeiko, a judge accused of collaborating with Russian forces, in a car bombing in Berdiansk.

Putin signed into law a bill allowing defendants in non-serious criminal cases to have their cases suspended or dismissed altogether on condition that they serve in Ukraine.

=== 3 October ===
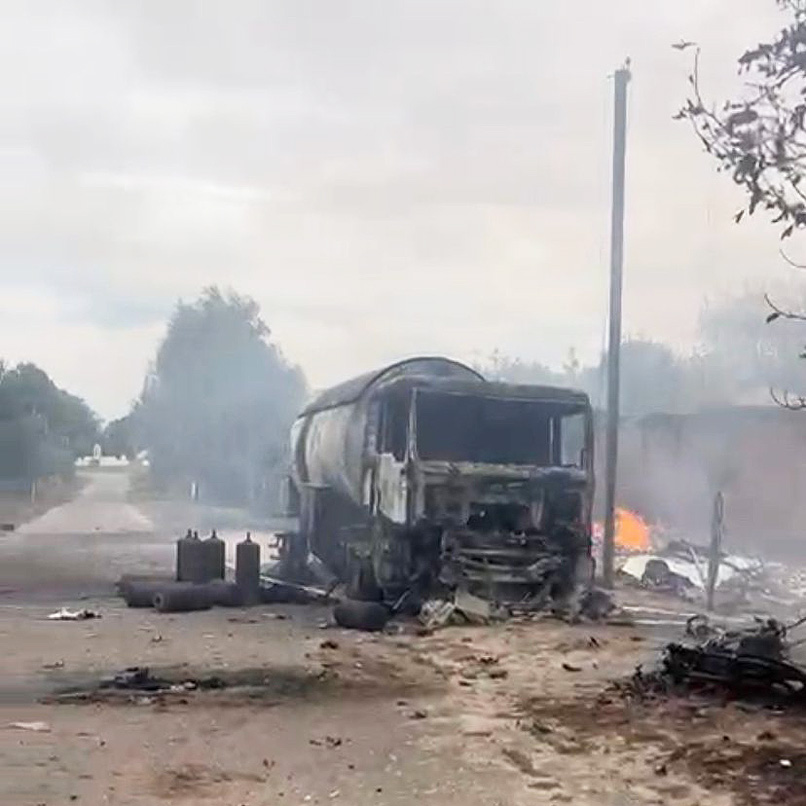
Destroyed truck, which delivered liquefied gas, in Hirsk

Three people were killed in a Russian attack on the village of Hirsk in Koriukivka Raion, Chernihiv Oblast.

Ukrainian forces claimed to have destroyed a Russian Nebo-M radar system in an unspecified location using an ATACMS missile.

The SBU reportedly launched a drone strike on the Borisoglebsk air base in Voronezh Oblast, targeting Su-34s, Su-35s, fuel tanks and a warehouse for Russian glide bombs.

A Patriot missile system donated by Romania arrived in Ukraine.

=== 4 October ===
An oil depot of Annanafteprodukt LLC in Anna, Voronezh Oblast, was struck by a Ukrainian drone. According to Russian officials the drone set fire to an empty storage facility. No injuries were reported. In total, Russian forces claimed to have intercepted 14 drones over Voronezh, Belgorod, and Rostov Oblasts as well as over the Sea of Azov.

Ukrainian officials said the Russian forces were now less than seven kilometers away from Pokrovsk.

Andrii Korotkyi, the head of security at the Zaporizhia Nuclear Power Plant and concurrent member of the Russian-installed municipal council of Enerhodar, was killed in a car bombing claimed by the HUR, which accused him of collaborating with Russian forces.

The Ukrainian Defence Ministry said that 177 Ukrainian POWs had died in Russian custody since the start of the full-scale invasion, with "thousands more" at risk.

The Ukrainian State Bureau of Investigation arrested two officials of the Pension Fund of Ukraine from Khmelnytskyi Oblast on suspicion of illegally registering men with "non-existent diagnoses" to help them avoid conscription. The SBI also found some US$5.2 million, Hr 5 million, 300,000 euros, jewellery, nine cars and ownership of some 30 properties in Ukraine, Turkey, Spain and Austria.

The ISW reported that an open-source analyst had confirmed that Russian forces lost 539 tanks (a division and a half's worth) and 1,020 IFVs (four to five divisions worth) in Pokrovsk Raion between 9 October 2023 and 4 October 2024. Between 6 September and 4 October alone, Russia lost 25 and 59 armored vehicles confirmed to be lost, or two battalions worth.

The HUR claimed to have killed at least 20 North Korean personnel, including at least six officers, and wounded three others in a missile strike in Donetsk Oblast.

=== 5 October ===
The Russian-installed mayor of Horlivka said that nine people were injured in a drone strike on a passenger bus.

An out of control Russian S-70 Okhotnik-B was deliberately shot down by a Russian Su-57 near Kostiantynivka.

The Ukrainian General Staff claimed to have struck three Russian command posts using Storm Shadow missiles and GMLRS. These command posts belonged to units operating in the "Pokrovsk direction" according to the ISW.

Ildar Dadin, a Russian opposition activist, was killed in action while serving with the Freedom of Russia Legion in Kharkiv Oblast.

=== 6 October ===
Four people including a child were injured during a Russian airstrike in Sumy.

Russian forces captured Tsukuryne, southeast of Pokrovsk. and claimed to have taken Zhelannoye Vtoroye, near Pokrovsk.

The Saint Kitts and Nevis-flagged cargo vessel Paresa, carrying 6,000 tons of corn, was damaged in a Russian air attack on Pivdennyi Port in Yuzhne, Odesa Oblast.

The Moscow Higher Combined Arms Command School was set on fire by a drone attack, with nearby residents reporting gunfire and explosions.

Lithuania seized military equipment aboard a Russian train that was heading from Kaliningrad to Moscow and gave them to Ukraine.

=== 7 October ===
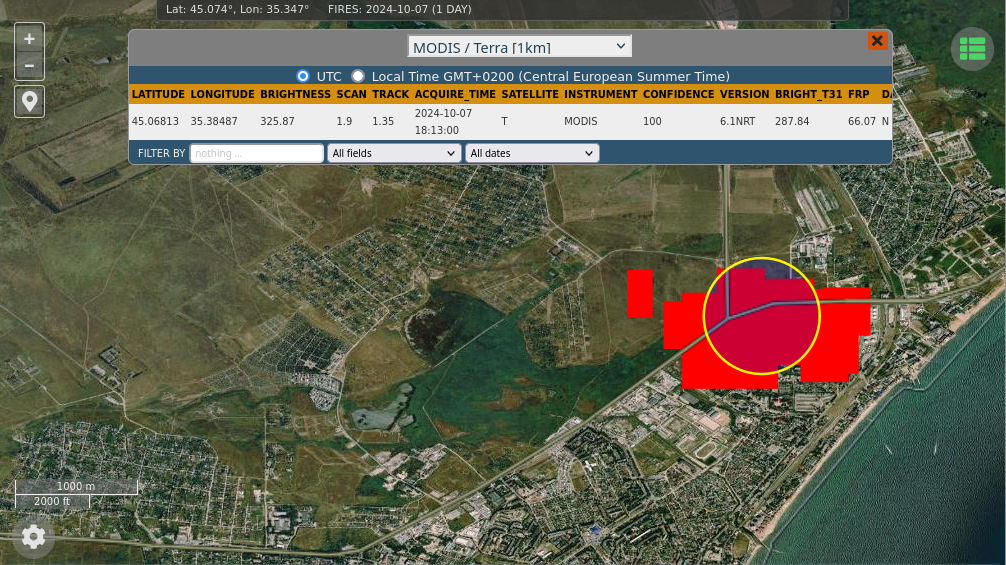
The 7 October fire in Feodosia detected by NASA's FIRMS

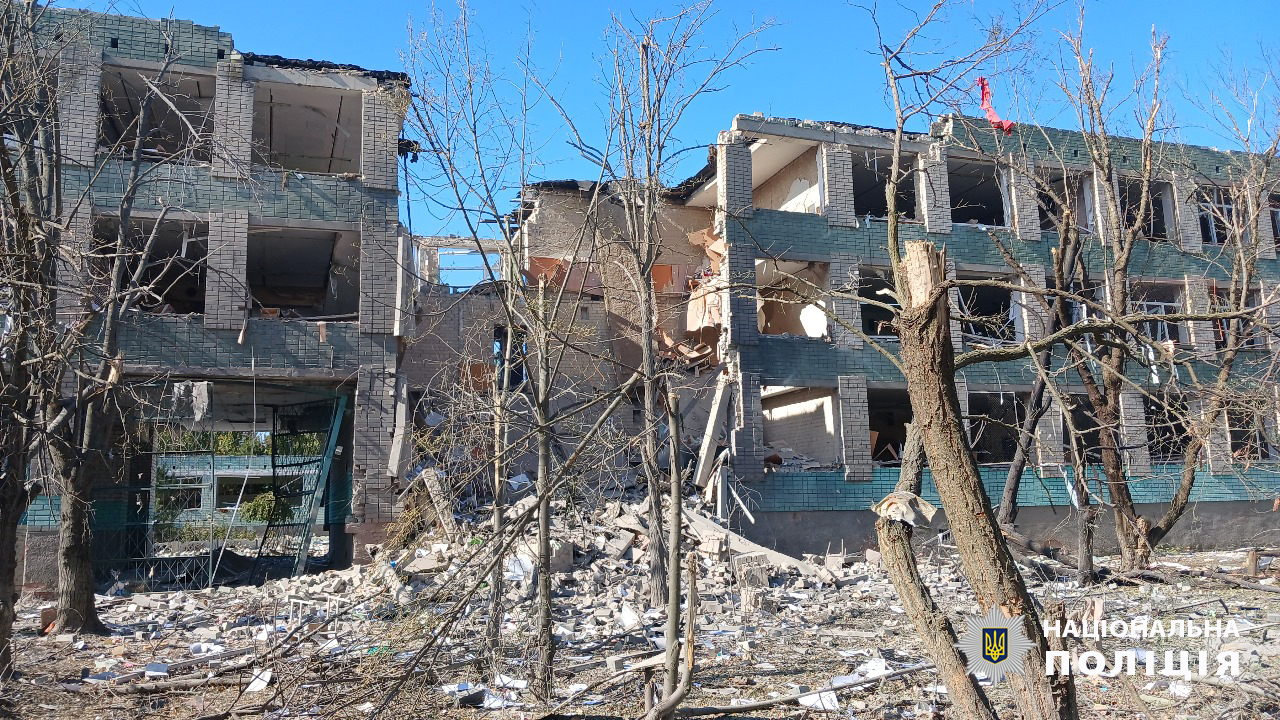
School in Kherson after bombing on 7 October

A Palau-flagged civilian vessel was damaged in a Russian air attack on Odesa, killing a Ukrainian port employee and injuring five foreign nationals.

An oil depot in Feodosia was set on fire by a Ukrainian missile attack, prompting the evacuation of more than 1,000 residents. Initially, fires covered 800 m^{2} (0.080 ha) but had extended to 10 fuel tanks and 2,500 m^{2} (0.25 ha) by 9 October, and the fire was still burning on 10 October.

Russian forces captured the village of Verkhnokamianske, east of Siversk, and were confirmed to have taken Miasozharivka in Luhansk Oblast.

The Ukrainian 3rd Assault Brigade said it had rescued four soldiers held prisoner by a Russian sabotage group in Kharkiv Oblast.

The Vovchansk Aggregate Plant was again seized by Russian forces.

Ukraine accused Russian forces of executing four POWs near Selydove.

The Ukrainian Navy announced that its Angels special intelligence unit had extracted four members of the family of a Ukrainian naval officer who were being persecuted by the FSB in Crimea.

Russia accused the Ukrainian-linked hacker group sudo rm -RF of launching a cyberattack on its state broadcaster VGTRK and its subsidiary channels, including Russia-1 and Russia-24. A Ukrainian official said the incident was meant to congratulate Putin on his birthday.

An unspecified number of F-16s previously used by the Netherlands arrived in Ukraine.

Vyacheslav Gladkov, Governor of Belgorod Oblast, announced a one-off bonus payment of 3 million rubles (€28,400) for people who join the Russian military. This bonus payment is only available until the end of the year and is 2.2 million rubles (€20,800, or 73%) higher than signing bonuses previously offered.

=== 8 October ===
Two people were killed by Russian airstrikes in Kharkiv. Two people were killed in a separate airstrike in Esman, Sumy Oblast.

In Russia, the governor of Belgorod Oblast claimed that two people were injured in a drone attack.

The United Kingdom imposed sanctions on several entities affiliated with the Russian defence ministry and military for their role in the usage of chemical weapons in Ukraine. Among those sanctioned were the Russian NBC Protection Troops, its commander Lieutenant-General Igor Kirillov and two scientific centers of the ministry.

Roskomnadzor, the Russian internet and media regulator, blocked the use of Discord servers, which are used by both Ukrainian and Russian militaries to communicate with their forces.

=== 9 October ===
The Panama-flagged civilian container vessel Shui Spirit was damaged in a Russian ballistic missile strike on the port of Odesa, killing eight people and injuring nine others.

Ukrainian drones struck a Russian ammunition dump in Bryansk Oblast. Ukraine claimed that artillery ammunition from North Korea, glide bombs and missiles were destroyed. A state of emergency was declared, while governor Alexander Bogomaz claimed 24 drones had been shot down.

Over 500 million euros of frozen Russian assets were released in the Netherlands with the approval from its Foreign Ministry.

Russia claimed to have captured the villages of Zolota Nyva and Zoryane Pershe, near Kurakhove. It also claimed to have retaken the villages of Novaya Sorochina and Pokrovsky in Kursk Oblast.

=== 10 October ===
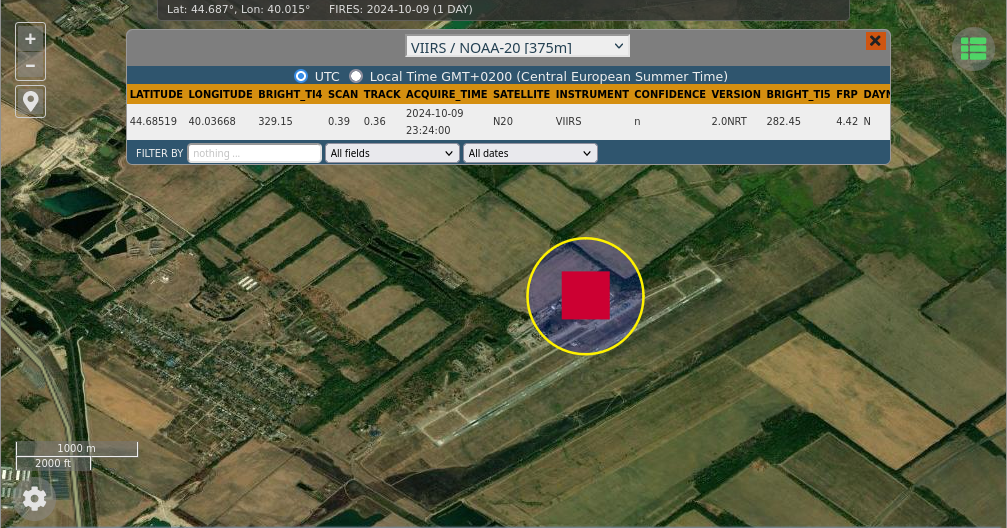
NASA's FIRMS detected a fire at Khanskaya air base on 9 October 23:24:00 (UTC)

In Russia, a Neptune missile struck an ammunition depot in Oktyabrsky, Krasnodar Krai, while a drone attack targeted the Khanskaya airbase outside Maykop in the constituent republic of Adygea. The HUR claimed to have destroyed over 400 Shahed UAVs, while Russia claimed to have shot down 92 drones overnight.

DeepStateMap.Live reported that nine Ukrainian "drone operators and contractors" were shot after surrendering to Russian forces in Kursk Oblast.

Ukrainian authorities announced the death of journalist Victoria Roshchyna, who had been held by Russia since August 2023 while reporting in occupied areas of Ukraine.

Russian forces were stated to have seized the village of Zhelanne Pershe, and were confirmed to have captured Mykolaivka, the last settlement before the city of Myrnohrad, and Krasnyi Yar, all southeast of Pokrovsk. Mykolaivka was later formally claimed captured by Russia on 23 October.

Ukrainian intelligence claimed that Russia is recruiting prisoners who have hepatitis B and C for "meat assaults". The prisoners would need to have vaccinations for Hep B and be put on antivirals.

=== 11 October ===
Four people were killed in a Russian missile attack on Odesa.

Ukrainian officials stated that Russian forces had seized between 50 and 60% of Toretsk.

Russia claimed to have captured the village of Ostrivske, near Kurakhove. DeepStateMap.Live confirmed that the village had been captured on 15 October.

The Ukrainian military claimed to have destroyed a Russian Mi-8 helicopter in Kharkiv Oblast.

The German government announced a new military aid package for Ukraine of 1.4 billion euros ($1.53 billion).

Oleksandr Syrskyi said that an estimated 50,000 Russian soldiers were redeployed to Kursk from other sectors.

=== 12 October ===
Russian and Ukrainian sources claimed that a Ukrainian F-16 shot down a Russian Su-34 at an unspecified location and date.

An oil depot in Rovenky, Luhansk Oblast was set on fire by Ukrainian drones.

The HUR claimed to have destroyed a Russian Tupolev Tu-134 transport aircraft used to transport officials of the Russian defence ministry at an airbase in Orenburg Oblast.

=== 13 October ===
A Ukrainian partisan group reported the presence of North Korean soldiers at three artillery training grounds in the vicinity of Mariupol, including one near Sartana.

=== 14 October ===
One person was killed in a Russian missile attack on the port of Odesa which damaged the Palau-flagged ship Optima, which was previously damaged in a missile attack on 7 October, and the Belize-flagged vessel NS Moon. Two people were killed in a drone attack near Beryslav.

Russia claimed to have captured the village of Levadne in Zaporizhzhia Oblast.

=== 15 October ===
One person was killed in a Russian missile attack on Mykolaiv.

Authorities in Kharkiv Oblast ordered the mandatory evacuation of residents of Kupiansk, Borova and surrounding communities due to increased Russian attacks.

According to Suspilne, Ukrainian military officials claimed that 18 North Korean soldiers deserted their positions some seven kilometers from the international border with Ukraine. A Western diplomat told The Kyiv Independent that 10,000 North Korean soldiers had been sent to Russia to "boost its war efforts against Ukraine". The soldiers are believed to form the Buryat Battalion, part of the Russian 11th Guards Air Assault Brigade.

Ukraine claimed to have killed 20 Russian soldiers at a training facility somewhere in southern Ukraine, likely using cluster munitions.

=== 16 October ===
Zelenskyy released his "victory plan" to the Verkhovna Rada, which included an invitation towards NATO membership for Ukraine and permission to use Western weaponry for long-range attacks against Russia.

Russia was visually confirmed to have recaptured Nevske in Luhansk Oblast.

Ukrainian forces claimed to have retaken 400 hectares of territory north of Lyptsi in Kharkiv Oblast.

The SBU arrested a senior security official of the Ukrainian state electricity firm Ukrenergo on suspicion of making pro-Russian and anti-Ukrainian statements as well as leaking information about damage to critical infrastructure from Russian attacks.

The Australian government announced a AUD$245 million aid package for Ukraine that included M1A1 Abrams tanks.

Nikita Klenkov, a high-ranking officer in the GRU, was killed in a suspected targeted killing in Moscow Oblast after recently returning from fighting in Ukraine.

The US government announced a new US$425 million military aid package for Ukraine. Including from NASAMS, RIM-7 missiles, HIMARS rockets, 105/155 mm artillery shells, TOW missiles, bullets and grenades.

=== 17 October ===
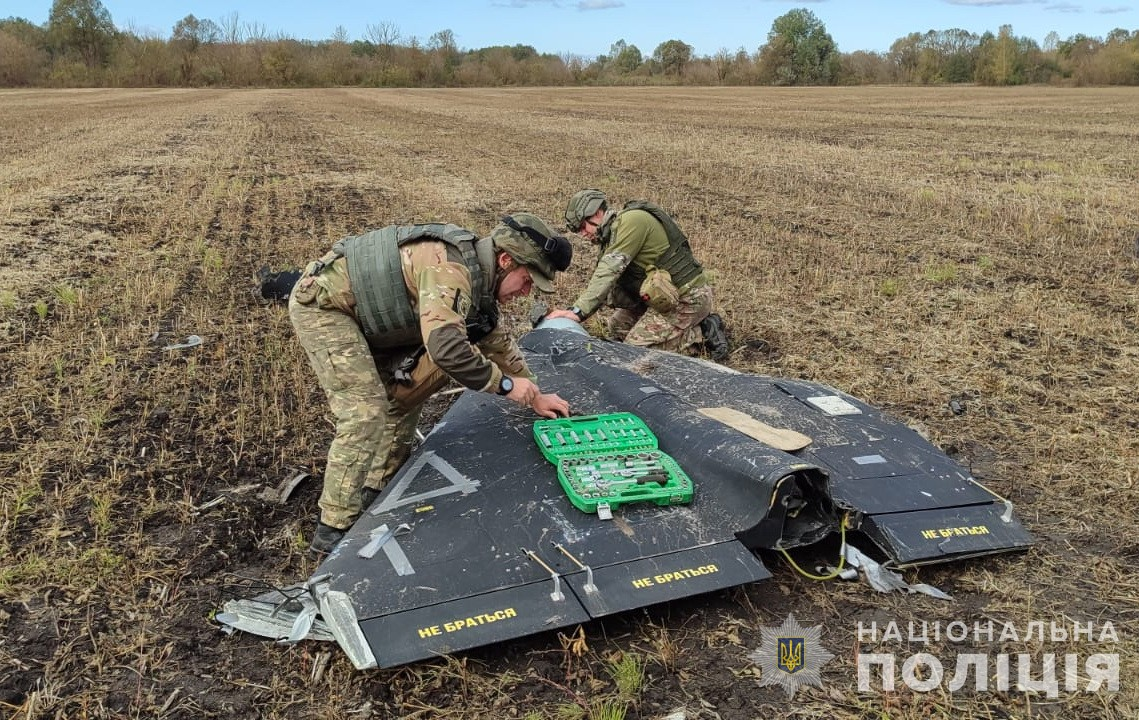
Disposing of a downed Russian drone in Sumy Oblast of Ukraine

Russia claimed to have captured the village of Maksymilianivka, east of Kurakhove. This was later confirmed on 20 October.

Zelenskyy presented his "victory plan" to EU leaders and NATO defence chiefs in Brussels.

=== 18 October ===
Ukrainian forces claimed to have pushed Russian forces out of Kruhliakivka in the Kupiansk sector. Russian forces then advanced in southwestern Kruhliakivka on 19 October during a mechanized assault.

The Ukrainian Air Force claimed to have shot down 80 out of 135 Russian drones. Forty-four drones were lost, potentially due to Ukrainian electronic warfare. Belarus and Romania were forced to scramble fighter jets although no drones were reported being shot down and no damage was reported in these countries. Likewise Ukraine reported no casualties and damage.

Russian forces were confirmed to have captured Nelipivka, southwest of Toretsk.

Ukraine accused Russian forces of executing two POWs near Selydove.

HUR chief General Kyrylo Budanov claimed that 12,000 North Korean soldiers would be ready to fight in Ukraine by 1 November.

The bodies of 501 soldiers, most of whom were killed in the Avdiivka sector, were repatriated to Ukraine in exchange for the bodies of 89 Russian soldiers.

Russia and Ukraine conducted a prisoner exchange mediated by the United Arab Emirates that led to the parties releasing 95 POWs each.

Russian major Dmitriy Pervukha, who was allegedly involved in war crimes in Ukraine, was killed in a car explosion in Luhansk.

=== 19 October ===
Russian media reported explosions during a drone attack on the districts of Vyborgsky and Primorsky in Saint Petersburg, where electricity was cut off. Russian media claimed that a drone had been shot down and there was "no threats to the population". A microelectronics plant was also set on fire in a separate drone attack in Bryansk.

One person was killed in a Russian airstrike in Shostka, Sumy Oblast.

Russian forces were confirmed to have seized Zhelanne Druhe in Donetsk Oblast.

=== 20 October ===
Over 100 Ukrainian drones attacked several regions in Russia, including Moscow. Russian officials claimed to have shot down 110 drones. Four firefighters were reported injured in Dzerzhinsk, Nizhny Novgorod Oblast, where the Sverdlovsk explosives factory was hit. The Lipetsk airfield was also struck.

In Russia, Dmitry Golenkov, a bomber pilot and chief of staff of Shaykovka air base who was accused of conducting attacks on civilian infrastructure in Ukraine such as the Kremenchuk shopping mall attack in 2022 and the 2023 Dnipro residential building airstrike, was found dead in an apple orchard in Bryansk Oblast in an apparent assassination. Photographs of Golenkov's body were released by the HUR, but no claim of responsibility was made. He was killed with a hammer, with the HUR calling it the "hammer of justice".

=== 21 October ===
Three people were killed in a Russian attack on Zaporizhzhia. Three others were killed in separate attacks in Myrnohrad and Kurakhove.

The Ukrainian military claimed to have destroyed a Russian Buk-M3 air defense system at an unspecified location 60 kilometers from existing frontlines.

US Defense Secretary Lloyd Austin visited Kyiv and announced a $400 million military aid package for Ukraine.

Russian forces were confirmed to have captured the town of Hrodivka, southeast of Pokrovsk.

South Korea summoned the Russian ambassador to formally protest the deployment of North Korean soldiers to Russia. The ambassador responded that cooperation between Russia and North Korea was lawful and not aimed at South Korea.

=== 22 October ===
Three people were killed in Russian drone strikes in Sumy Oblast.

Russian authorities claimed that four industrial facilities, including three alcohol distilleries, were struck by drone attacks in Tula, Tambov and Voronezh Oblasts. Russian forces claimed to have shot down 18 drones during the overnight attack.

The Ukrainian government received £2.26 billion ($2.93 billion) from the British government taken from the proceeds of frozen Russian assets.

The South Korean government warned Russia that it could send "both defensive and offensive weapons" to Ukraine if North Korean soldiers were sent to fight there.

Putin extended the deadline for Russian forces to retake parts of Kursk under Ukrainian control from 15 October 2024, to 1 February 2025.

Ukrainian Prosecutor General Andriy Kostin resigned after a number of scandals involving medical exemptions for men of military age to avoid being conscripted into the Ukrainian military. The issue prompted Zelenskyy to sign a decree ordering the dissolution of medical examination commissions for determining the severity of disabilities that qualified for military exemptions.

Personnel from Russia's Strategic Rocket Forces began being used as infantry, with a unit called the "1st Strategic Missile Regiment" established with the help of civilian fund raising and deployed in Kursk Oblast.

=== 23 October ===
The SBU arrested a couple from Zaporizhzhia on suspicion of plotting a bomb attack in Kyiv and burning military vehicles on behalf of Russia.

US Defense Secretary Lloyd Austin confirmed the presence of North Korean troops in Russia.

The US government finalised its $20 billion contribution to a G7 loan of $50 billion to Ukraine, which is to be paid for using proceeds from seized Russian funds.

Sébastien Lecornu, French Armed Forces Minister, announced that France would send the first of three Mirage 2000s to Ukraine by March 2025. These aircraft would be capable of carrying SCALP EG and MICA missiles and have updated electronic warfare systems. Ukrainian pilots were to be trained in their usage.

The Ukrainian Ministry of Defence claimed that the ratio between Russian and Ukrainian artillery has fallen to "about one-to-two in favor of Russian forces".

Roman Hladkyi was dismissed as chief of staff of the Ukrainian Unmanned Systems Forces after an SBU investigation found that his position was "untenable".

Russian forces captured the village of Izmailivka, southeast of Pokrovsk, while Russia claimed that Serebrianka in Donetsk Oblast had been seized.

=== 24 October ===
One person was killed in a Russian airstrike in Kupiansk.

The Romanian Air Force scrambled F-16s to intercept two targets, described as "most likely separate drones", that had entered Romanian airspace near Constanța and Tulcea, near the border with Ukraine. Romanian radar lost contact with the objects before they could be intercepted.

Russian forces seized the village of Novosadove.

=== 25 October ===
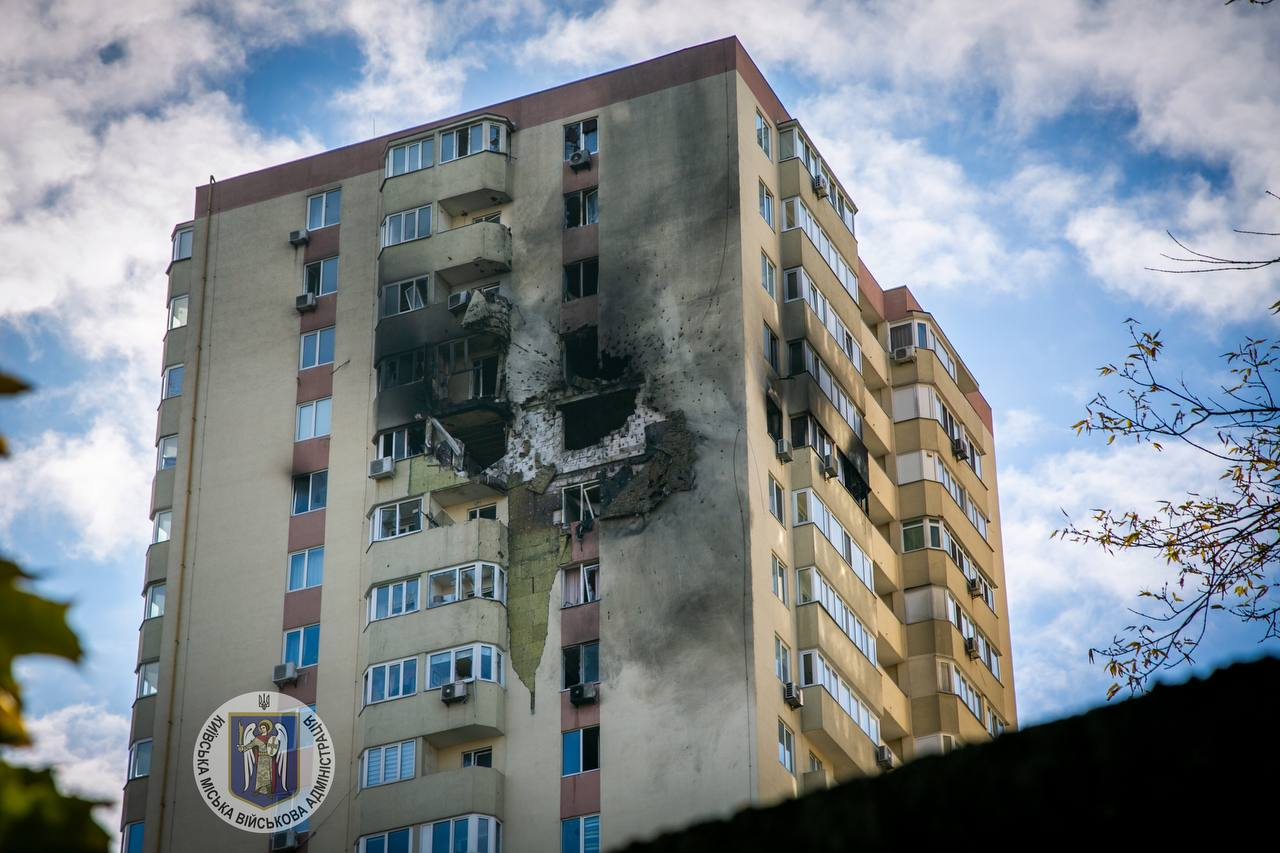
Residential building in Kyiv after the attack

Five people were killed in a Russian missile attack on Dnipro. One person was killed in a drone strike in Kyiv.

A Ukrainian drone destroyed a Buk-M3 anti-aircraft missile system and a Buk-M2 radar in Luhansk Oblast.

Zelenskyy signed into law a bill allowing foreign nationals to become officers in the International Legion.

=== 26 October ===
Russian forces captured Levadne.

=== 27 October ===
Ukraine accused Russian forces of killing two civilians in Selydove. Five people were killed in separate attacks in Kherson Oblast.

Russian forces captured the city of Hirnyk and the village of Bohoiavlenka in Donetsk Oblast.

In Russia, a drone strike set fire to an oil facility in Tambov Oblast, while two people were killed in a separate attack on a convent in Kursk Oblast. Russian forces claimed to have shot down 51 drones overnight.

=== 28 October ===
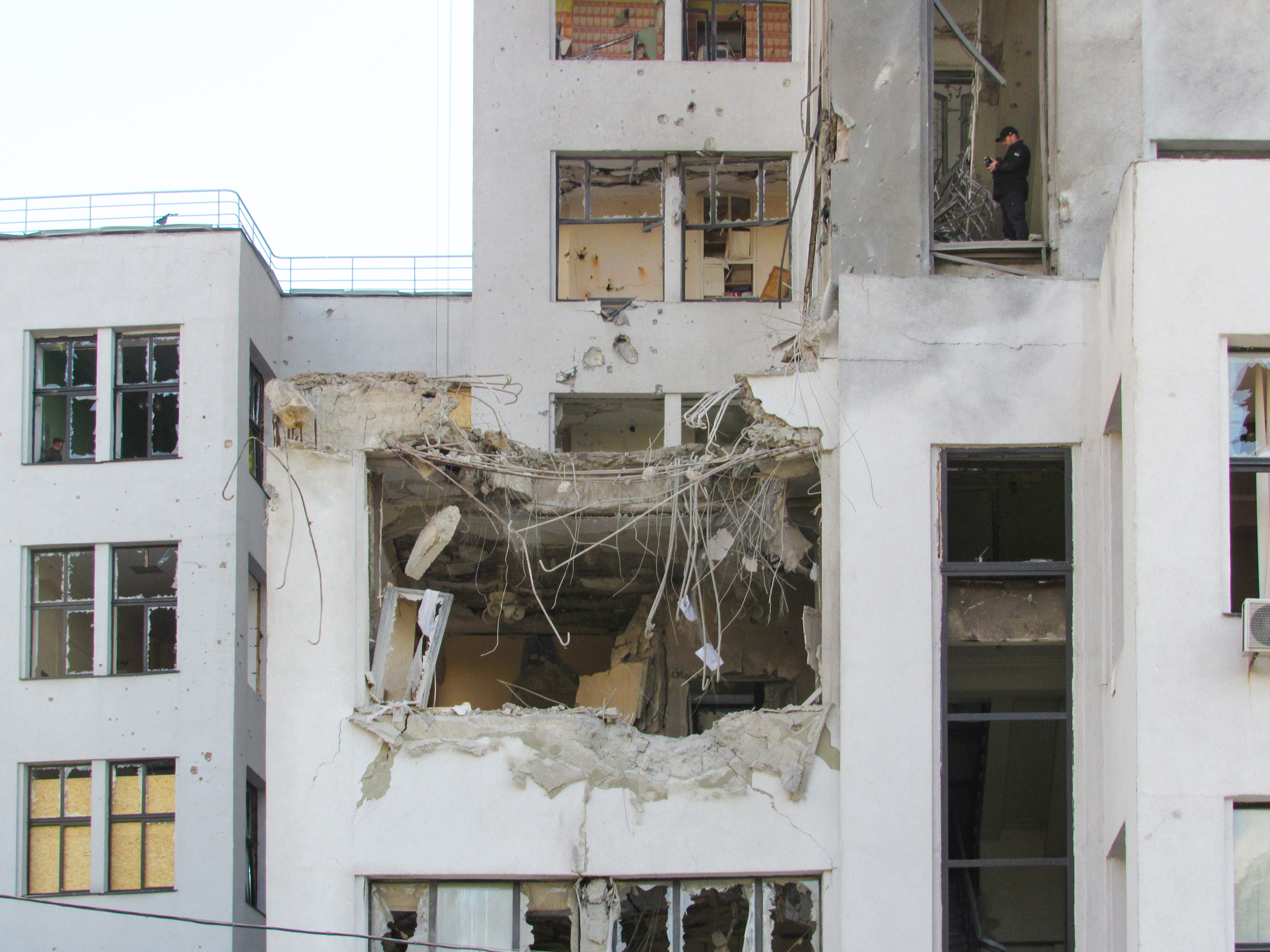
Derzhprom building after the bombing

Two people were killed in a Russian missile attack on Kryvyi Rih. In Kharkiv, a guided Russian bomb struck the Derzhprom building, a structure placed under provisional enhanced UNESCO protection since 2022, injuring nine people.

The HUR claimed that partisans blew up a railway bridge in Berdiansk.

Russian sources said that Ukrainian drones attacked two ethanol plants in Voronezh Oblast. According to the local governor, two workers were wounded after a fire broke out at a distillery. Two people were killed in a separate drone attack in Kursk Oblast.

The FSB claimed to have killed four "saboteurs" who entered Bryansk Oblast from Ukraine.

NATO secretary-general Mark Rutte confirmed that North Korean troops were stationed in Kursk Oblast and called for international pressure on Russia and North Korea to adhere to UN mandates.

Swiss President Viola Amherd said she was in favour of removing limits on the reexporting of weapons made in Switzerland to third countries, specifically Ukraine, which she claimed was hurting the Swiss armament industry.

Croatia, in a deal with Germany, announced that it would purchase 50 Leopard 2A8 tanks in exchange for sending 30 tanks and IFVs to Ukraine.

The South Korean government sent a delegation to Ukraine to discuss cooperation and share information on North Korean soldiers.

=== 29 October ===
Four people were killed in Russian airstrikes on Kharkiv.

Explosions were reported in Luhansk following a suspected missile attack.

Russia claimed to have taken the city of Selydove, southeast of Pokrovsk. This was confirmed a day later. Russian forces claimed to have captured Katerynivka and Yasna Polyana.

In Russia, a drone attack was reported for the first time in Chechnya, causing a fire at the Russian Special Forces University in Gudermes.

According to locals, Ukrainian drones struck Zheleznogorsk, Kursk Oblast, setting fire to a "government building". In addition to Kursk, drones were shot down over Bryansk, Rostov, Smolensk and Belgorod oblasts. Russian sources claimed to have downed 23 drones.

Ukrainian National Security and Defense Council Secretary Oleksandr Lytvynenko indicated that Ukraine would mobilise another 160,000 soldiers. One million and fifty citizens have been drafted since the full-scale invasion started.

=== 30 October ===
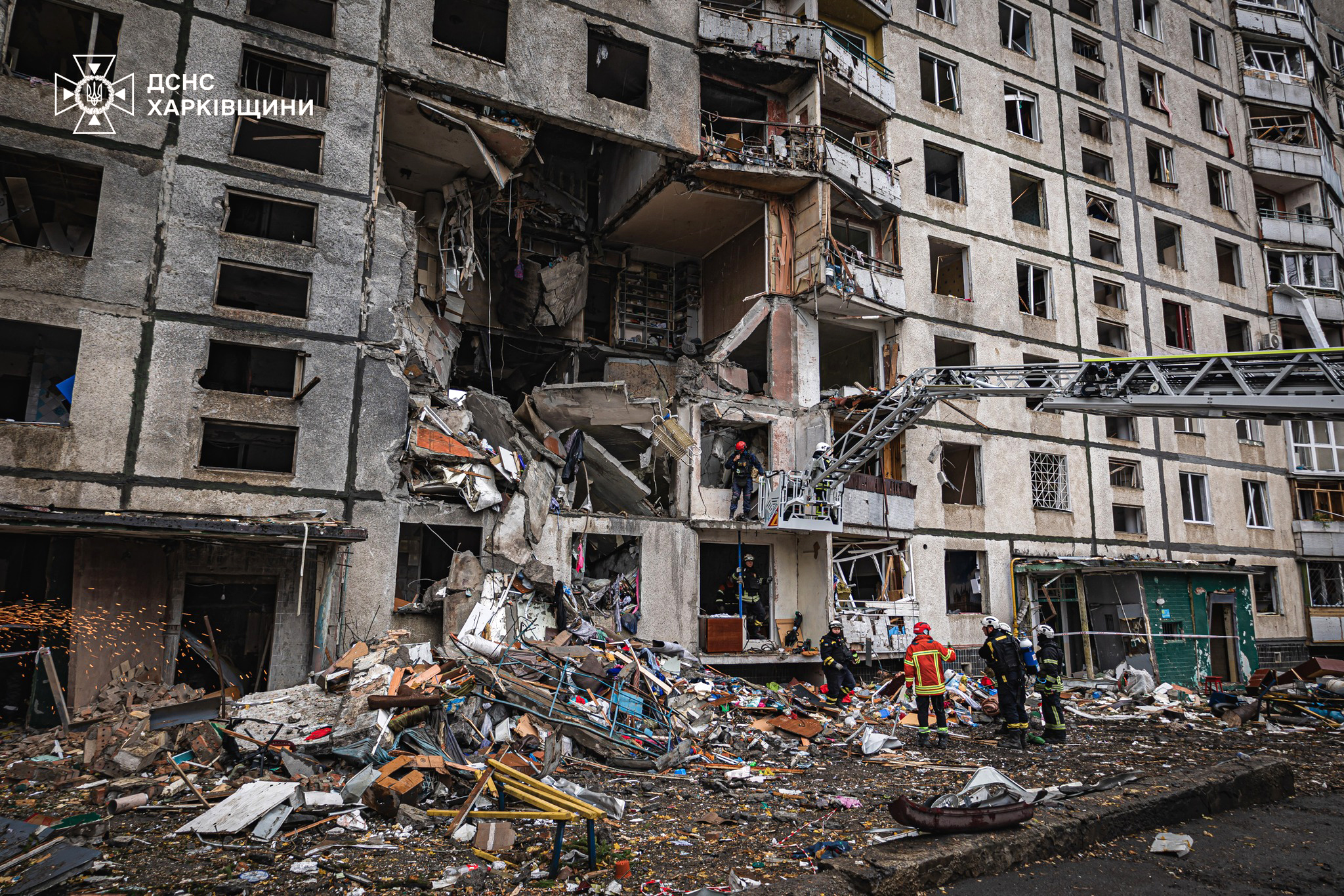
Residential building in Kharkiv after the attack

Three people were killed in a Russian airstrike in Kharkiv.

Russia claimed to have retaken Kruhliakivka in Kharkiv Oblast. The reports were confirmed a day later.

The US imposed sanctions on nearly 400 individuals and entities across multiple countries for the role in supplying advanced technologies for the Russian war effort in Ukraine.

CNN, citing "Western intelligence officials", reported that small groups of North Korean soldiers had been deployed into Ukraine.

A 72-year-old mechanical engineer was arrested in Odessa by the SBU on suspicion of collaborating with Russian intelligence and helping Russia "enhance" its Shahed drones.

=== 31 October ===
Ukrainian drones struck the port of Berdiansk. Locals reported explosions and firing from Russian air defence. At least six sea drones were used.

In Russia, the head of the republic of Bashkortostan claimed that a Ukrainian drone damaged an oil refinery in Ufa.

Geo-located footage showed that Russian forces captured the settlements of Kurakhivka, Novoukrainka and Olexandropil. Russian forces also claimed that they have captured Vovchenka and Kreminna Balka.

== November 2024 ==
=== 1 November ===
A police officer was killed in a Russian missile attack on a police station in Kharkiv.

Ukrainian drones struck an oil depot in Svetlograd, Stavropol Krai, some 600 kilometers from the Russia-Ukraine border. Russian officials claimed to have shot down 32 drones over Crimea and Kursk, Bryansk, Voronezh, Oryol, and Belgorod Oblasts.

The US announced a $425 million military aid package to Ukraine.

Russian forces claimed to have captured Stepanivka and Illinka.

=== 2 November ===
Russian forces claimed to have captured Trudove and Kurakhivka in Donetsk Oblast, as well as Pershotravneve in Kharkiv Oblast.

=== 3 November ===
Several buildings within the campus of Taras Shevchenko University of Kyiv were damaged in a Russian drone attack.

Russia claimed to have taken the villages of Vyshneve, 12 kilometers from Pokrovsk, and Leonidivka.

Belgian company Thales and an unnamed Ukrainian company signed an agreement to build FZ275 LGRs in Ukraine for use against drones.

=== 4 November ===
Ukrainian official Andriy Kovalenko claimed that North Korean forces helping the Russian war effort in Kursk Oblast had come under fire for the first time, with senior Ukrainian intelligence confirming the engagement, marking the first foreign military intervention since the invasion began.

Taiwan confirmed that it had transferred its retired HAWK missiles to Ukraine via the United States.

=== 5 November ===
Six people were killed in a Russian missile attack on Zaporizhzhia.

Russian officials claimed that one person was injured in a Ukrainian drone strike on Belgorod.

Ukraine's Center for Defense Strategies expert Viktor Kevlyuk stated that the Russian recruitment system is "struggling to keep pace with losses", and that Russian forces suffered 57,500 casualties between 29 September and 24 October, while monthly reinforcements of around 20,000 to 25,000 "fall short of the replacement threshold", although the ISW could not independently confirm this.

A 22-year-old British national, Callum Tindal-Draper, was killed in action while fighting for Ukraine.

=== 6 November ===
A drone attack was recorded in the Russian republic of Dagestan for the first time since the invasion, with strikes reported on the garrison of the Russian Navy's Caspian Flotilla in Kaspiysk. One person was injured.

Ukrainian Commander in Chief General Oleksandr Syrskyi said that Russia has lost over 20,800 soldiers in Kursk, with 7,905 killed, 12,220 wounded, and 717 captured as of 5 November, along with equipment of various types. He further claimed 45,000 soldiers had been sent by Russia to Kursk.

Major General Pavel Klimenko, the commander of the Russian army's 5th Separate Motor Rifle Brigade based in Donetsk Oblast, was killed while fighting in Ukraine, becoming the eighth Russian general to be killed in action since the full-scale invasion started.

Russian forces claimed to have captured Novodmytrivka in southern Donetsk Oblast.

=== 7 November ===
Ten people were killed in Russian airstrikes in Zaporizhzhia.

Russian forces captured the town of Novooleksiivka, south of Pokrovsk.

Russian milblogger Fighterbomber, along with other milbloggers, reported a loss of a Ka-52. The pilot died but the co-pilot survived by ejecting. No further details were supplied.

=== 8 November ===
One person was killed in Russian drone strikes in Odesa. The apartment residence of Estonian ambassador Annely Kolk was damaged in a separate drone strike in Pechersk, Kyiv. Kolk was uninjured.

In Russia, officials claimed that an oil refinery in Saratov was damaged in a drone attack.

Two Russian soldiers were convicted by the Southern District Military Court in Rostov-on-Don for the killing of nine members of the same family in occupied Volnovakha in 2023 and sentenced to life imprisonment.

The bodies of 563 Ukrainian soldiers killed in action were repatriated from Russia and occupied areas of Donetsk Oblast.

=== 9 November ===
One person was killed in a Russian drone attack in Odesa.

Russia claimed that it had shot down 50 Ukrainian drones over Bryansk, Kursk, Novgorod, Smolensk, Tula, Oryol, and Tver Oblasts.

The US allowed a limited number of American defense contractors to operate within Ukraine to maintain and repair US-supplied weaponry.

Zelenskyy announced the production of Ukraine's "first 100 missiles".

France announced an additional consignment of 10 SCALP-EG missiles to Ukraine and additional Mistral missiles.

Two Ukrainian POWs were killed in Kursk Oblast by Russian forces, according to footage on social media. The Ukrainian Office of the Prosecutor General opened an investigation.

=== 10 November ===
Thirty-two Ukrainian drones attacked Moscow, closing Moscow's major airports to flights. No damage was reported but one was injured according to the Mayor of Moscow, Sergei Sobyanin, in what was described as "the biggest drone strike" on the city. Drones also attacked Bryansk and Kaluga Oblasts, setting fire to several "non-residential buildings". Russian forces claimed to have shot down a total of 23 drones. That same night, Russia launched its largest drone attack on Ukraine, involving 145 drones. Two of the drones crashed in the Căușeni and Rîșcani Districts of Moldova.

The HUR claimed responsibility for a Mi-24 being destroyed by fire at the Klin-5 airbase in Moscow Oblast.

The US was speeding up the delivery of 500 interceptor missiles to Ukraine, according to the Wall Street Journal. Previously the delivery had been planned for April 2025.

Ukrainian officials claimed that Russia and North Korea have amassed some 50,000 soldiers to recapture Ukrainian-held portions of Kursk Oblast. North Korean soldiers were also deployed in Belgorod Oblast.

US President-elect Donald Trump reportedly held a call with Putin, advising restraint in Ukraine and mentioning the US military presence in Europe, though the Kremlin denied the call took place.

=== 11 November ===
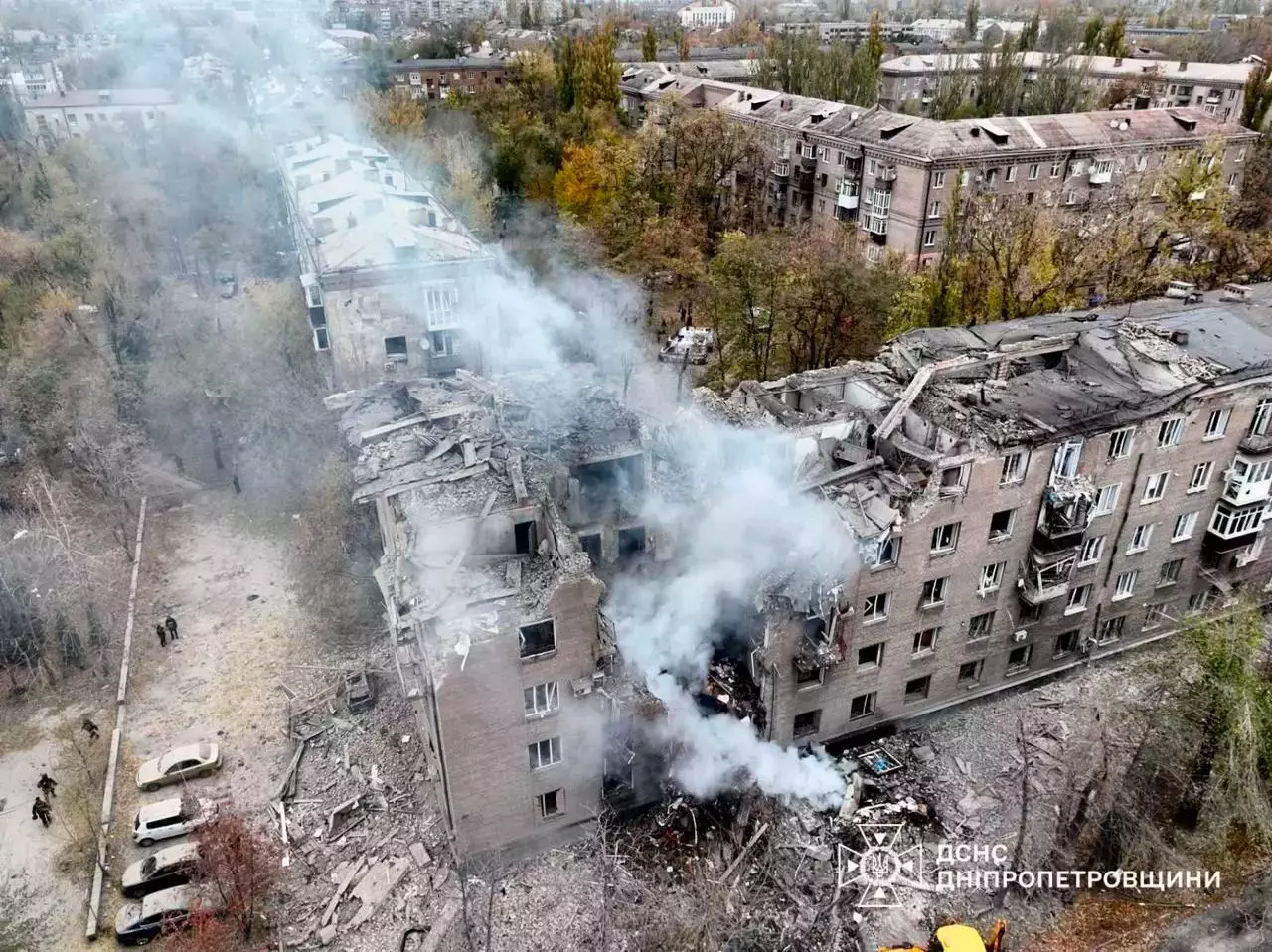
Residential building in Kryvyi Rih after the strike

Five people were killed in a Russian drone attack on Mykolaiv, while four others were killed in a missile attack on Kryvyi Rih. One person was killed in a separate attack in Zaporizhzhia.

The Kurakhove Reservoir dam, near the village of Stari Terny in Donetsk Oblast, was destroyed, causing water to flow into the Vovcha River and posing a threat of flooding for residents of villages on the river.

The Russian ministry of defense claimed that its forces had captured Kolisnykivka.

A Russian Shahed drone struck an apartment block in Belgorod, injuring two people.

The General Staff of Ukraine's Armed Forces claimed Russian forces suffered their highest losses of the war in a single day, 1,950 killed, wounded or missing, breaking the previous record set the day before.

The FSB claimed to have foiled a Ukrainian plot to recruit a Russian pilot to divert a military helicopter to Ukraine.

Estonia announced a new military aid package to Ukraine that included clothing and small arms.

=== 12 November ===
In Russia, the governor of Belgorod Oblast claimed that an oil silo was set on fire in a Ukrainian drone attack on a refinery near Stary Oskol.

The FSB claimed to have foiled a Ukrainian plot to set fire to a section of railway in Crimea, resulting in the arrest of one suspect near the Balaklava power station.

Russia ordered the arrest of ICC judge Haykel Ben Mahfoudh, who was among three judges who issued arrest warrants against former defence minister Sergei Shoigu and Chief of General Staff Valery Gerasimov for war crimes in Ukraine.

Denmark signed contracts to purchase $629 million worth of Ukrainian-built weapons for the Ukrainian military to promote Ukrainian domestic weapons production.

Russian forces claimed to captured Novoselydivka, Makarivka and Rivnopil in Donetsk Oblast.

=== 13 November ===
Geo-located footage showed that Russian forces captured Illinka in Donetsk Oblast.

Valery Trankovsky, a Russian naval officer who served as the chief of staff for the 41st Missile Boat Brigade of the Black Sea Fleet, was killed by a car bomb in Sevastopol. The SBU claimed credit for the attack while Russia media confirmed the death of a naval officer.

The Ukrainian Ministry of Defence released an "analytical memo" discussing the construction of a nuclear device "within months" if Donald Trump cut aid to Ukraine as president. Such a weapon would be similar to the Fat Man bomb dropped on Nagasaki in 1945. It would use a "plutonium-based device" due to Ukraine lacking access to uranium enrichment facilities.

The Director General of Mosfilm, Karen Shakhnazarov confirmed that the firm gave armoured vehicles to the Russian military for use in Ukraine in 2023, including 28 T-55 tanks, eight PT-76 tanks, six infantry fighting vehicles and eight tow trucks that were being used as filming props.

Putin signed a decree cutting benefits to wounded Russian soldiers. Previously, only a cap of 3 million rubles existed for payments. Now there are now three classifications: a "severe" wound is limited to a payment of 3 million rubles (nearly $29,000). Minor wounds are capped at 1 million rubles (nearly $10,000). Soldiers with "other minor injuries" compensation was capped at 100,000 rubles ($960).

=== 14 November ===
One person was killed in a Russian air attack on Odesa.

Russian forces claimed to have captured Dalnie, Novodarivka and Voznesenka in Donetsk Oblast. Geo-located footage showed that Russian forces captured Antonivka, Donetsk Oblast.

Two Russian armoured vehicle columns entered Kupiansk in Kharkiv Oblast.

A Ukrainian missile strike was reported on a Russian military base in Belgorod, injuring several conscripts.

=== 15 November ===
In Russia, the governor of Krasnodar Krai claimed that several residences were damaged in a drone attack in which 36 drones were intercepted.

The SBU arrested a lieutenant-colonel of the Ukrainian Special Operations Forces who had been "leaking" military plans to the GRU as a mole recruited before the start of the full-scale invasion.

Russian forces occupied a bridge along the Sudost river on the border of Chernihiv Oblast. Russian sources claimed that the abandoned settlements of Hremiach, Kolos, Novoselydivka and Muravi, cut off from the rest of the oblast by the river, had been captured or entered. Russian forces also claimed to have captured Krymske near Toretsk.

France finished training and equipping a new Ukrainian 155th "Anna of Kyiv" brigade of some 4,500 soldiers. The unit is equipped with 128 VAB APCs, 18 AMX-10RC light tanks, 18 CAESAR SPGs, Mistral MANPADS and Milan ATGMs.

=== 16 November ===
Ukrainian forces claimed to have destroyed a Russian Buk-M1 missile system. The Ukrainian partisan group Atesh claimed to have set fire to railway infrastructure in Tokmak, occupied Zaporizhzhia Oblast.

North Korea recently supplied Russia with 50 170mm M1989 howitzers and 20 "updated" 240 mm MLRS.

=== 17 November ===
Burning cars in Sumy after the attack

Russia launched a massive air attack on cities across Ukraine, killing two people in Mykolaiv, two in Nikopol, two in Odesa and one person in Lviv. According to President Zelenskyy over 200 missile and 90 drones were fired overnight and in the early morning. Allegedly the strikes were part of the attacks on Ukraine's energy grid in an effort to disrupt power supply during the upcoming winter. It was the biggest aerial attack since August 2024 with reports of attacks on the critical infrastructure of Lviv Oblast, Ivano-Frankivsk Oblast and Rivne Oblast in Western Ukraine as well as on the cities of Kryvyi Rih, Vinnytsia, Odesa and Kyiv. In the evening, another series of missile attacks killed 11 people in Sumy.

The Russian ministry of defence claimed it had intercepted 84 Ukrainian drones over six regions; flights were diverted from three Moscow airports. One person was killed in Belgorod Oblast and two journalists were killed in Kursk Oblast.

Ukraine's Center for Countering Disinformation reported that the Izhevsk Electromechanical Plant in Russia was struck by UAVs. The factory produces radar, air defense systems such the Tor missile system and other equipment according to Andrii Kovalenk, head of the Ukrainian counter-disinformation department. A person was reportedly injured during the attack.

Two Ukrainian HIMARS strikes killed some 50 Russian soldiers in Tavria, Zaporizhzhia Oblast.

President Biden allowed Ukraine to use ATACMS to strike into Russian territory. Permission for the US ACTAMS strikes are limited to Russian and North Korean forces in Kursk Oblast. According to Le Figaro, France and Britain also allowed Ukraine to use SCALP and Storm Shadow missiles on targets inside Russia.

=== 18 November ===
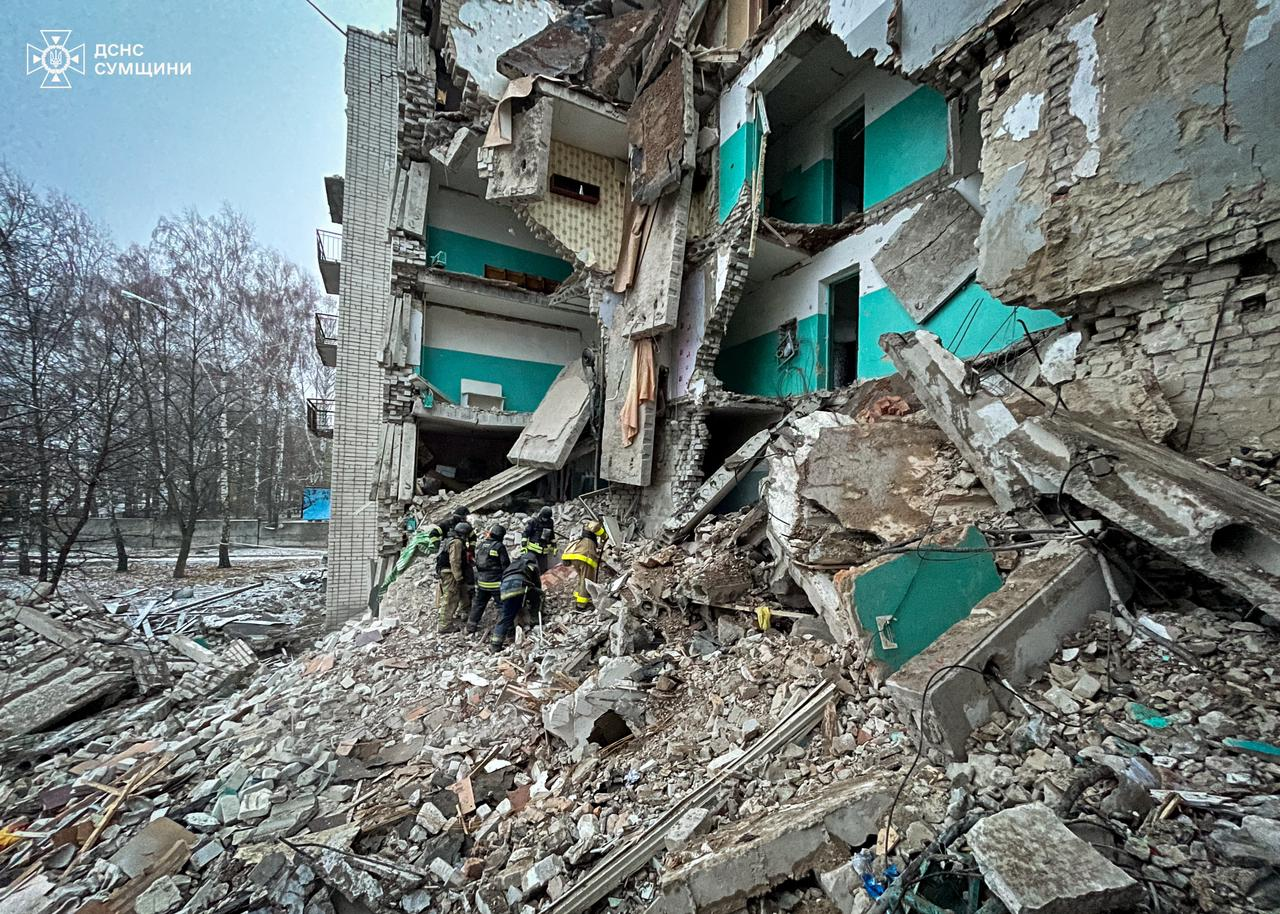
Dormitory in Hlukhiv after the attack

Ten people were killed in a Russian missile attack on Odesa. Twelve more people were killed in a separate attack on a dormitory in Hlukhiv, Sumy Oblast.

The mayor of Moscow claimed that several drones were shot down outside the city.

Germany announced that it would deliver 4,000 "mini-Taurus" kamikaze drones to Ukraine equipped with AI and with a longer range than Ukrainian drones.

Geo-located footage showed that Russian forces captured Hryhorivka near Pokrovsk.

Ukraine claimed that it has built 100 Neptune missiles so far this year. Serial production has been expanded with plans to extend the range of the missile from 400 kilometres to 1000 kilometres.

EU chief's diplomat Josep Borrell confirmed that the US has allowed strikes 300 kilometres into Russia, using weapons it supplied to Ukraine.

=== 19 November ===
The Ukrainian military claimed to have struck a Russian ammunition depot in Karachev, Bryansk Oblast using ATACMS for the first time. Drones also set industrial facilities on fire in Belgorod and Voronezh Oblasts.

President Biden allowed the sending of anti-personnel mines for use by Ukraine, which are banned by over 160 countries but are used by Russia. These landmines are not to be used in civilian areas and have timers on them to make them inert after a period of time.

Zelenskyy claimed that Ukraine manufactured over two and a half million rounds of artillery ammunition, ranging from 60 to 155 mm, since the start of 2024.

Russian journalist Vazhnyie Istorii published documents, dated from April 2024, that he claimed showed that 1,010 Russian personnel had deserted from the 20th Guards Motor Rifle Division since the beginning of the war, including 26 junior officers, a major, and two lieutenant colonels.

=== 20 November ===
Ukrainian sources stated that Russian forces captured the town of Rozdoine in Donetsk Oblast.

One person was killed in a Russian cluster munitions attack in Donetsk Oblast.

Ukrainian forces claimed to have destroyed a command post in Gubkin, Belgorod Oblast, without specifying the weapon used. Russia claimed to have shot down 44 drones, including three over Belgorod Oblast.

Ukrainian drones struck the 13th arsenal of the Main Missile and Artillery Directorate located at Kotovo, Novgorod Oblast, some 680 kilometres from the Ukrainian border. Residents of Kotovo were evacuated to nearby Okulovka as a precaution with several drones being reported as being shot down by Russian air defences.

The US, Greek, Italian and Canadian embassies in Kyiv were closed due to a warning the US received about a "potentially significant Russian air attack".

Up to 12 British-made Storm Shadow missiles, based on recovered wreckage, were fired at a command post believed to have hosted several North Korean and Russian officers in Maryino, Kursk Oblast. Lieutenant General Valery Solodchuk was allegedly killed, 18 Russian soldiers were killed, 33 wounded and 500 DPRK soldiers were killed. Thirteen sappers from the Russian 88th Mechanized Brigade were reported later wounded while trying to clear the unexploded ordnance.

Germany announced a military aid package to Ukraine including ammunition for Marder IFVs, 4 PzH 2000 howitzers, border patrol vehicles, many different types of drones, 47 MRAP vehicles, over 40,000 155 mm shells, a TRML-4D radar and other supplies.

=== 21 November ===
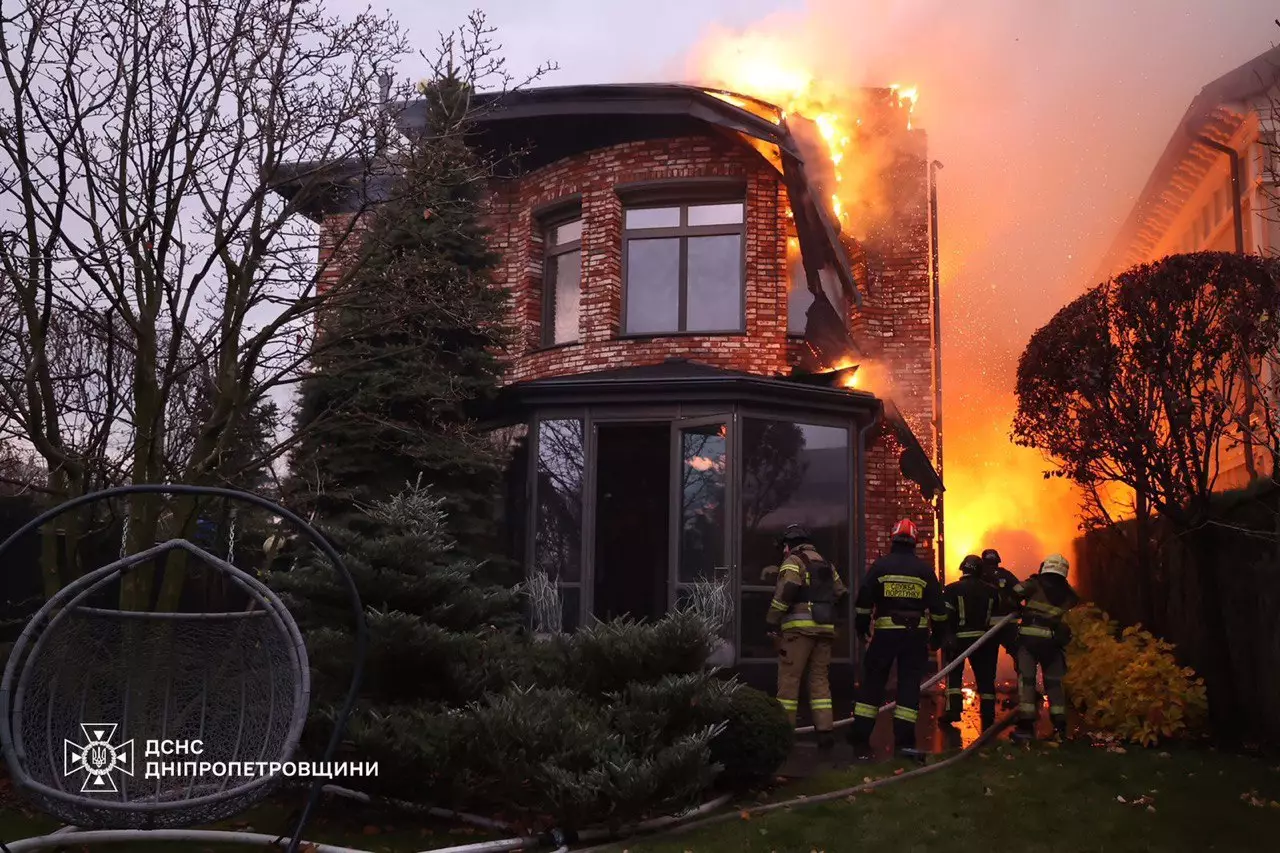
House in Dnipro after the attack

Ukraine claimed that Russia launched an intercontinental ballistic missile (ICBM) without nuclear warheads at Dnipro, which would be the first time an intercontinental ballistic missile had been used in combat. US officials later claimed that it was actually an intermediate-range ballistic missile (IRBM), while Putin said in an address to the nation that it was an experimental missile called Oreshnik.

Ukraine accused Russian forces of shooting dead two civilians in an apartment in Toretsk.

In Russia, a drone caused a fire at an industrial facility in Rostov Oblast, while another drone was shot down in Volgograd Oblast.

=== 22 November ===
Two people were killed in a Russian drone strike on Sumy.

The Verkhovna Rada suspended its sitting for the day due to fears of a Russian attack.

Russian forces claimed to have captured the town of Berestky in Donetsk Oblast.

=== 23 November ===
Russian milbloggers reported that Colonel-General Gennady Anashkin was dismissed from his post as commander of the Southern Military District after his subordinates "submitted incorrect reports" about advances near the city of Siversk. The Russian MoD confirmed the dismissal but called it a "planned rotation".

In Kursk Oblast, Russian milbloggers claimed that Russian forces had recaptured the towns of Darino and Nikolayevo-Darino. Russian officials claimed that two people were killed in a missile attack in Bolshoye Zhirovo, while the Russian defence ministry accused Ukrainian forces of launching ATACMS missiles at Vostochny airbase, injuring at least two soldiers.

=== 24 November ===
Russian forces claimed to have downed two missiles and 27 drones over Kursk Oblast. Other Russian sources reported that five missiles, possibly Storm Shadow missiles, had been fired. The local governor gave no details of damage or casualties. In Lipetsk Oblast, locals reported firing from air defence systems and explosions.

Ukrainian forces claimed to have destroyed a Russian S-400 battery in Kursk Oblast. The S-400 was using its missiles to strike ground targets.

Russian forces claimed to have captured the towns of Zoria and Sontsivka, in Donetsk Oblast.

=== 25 November ===
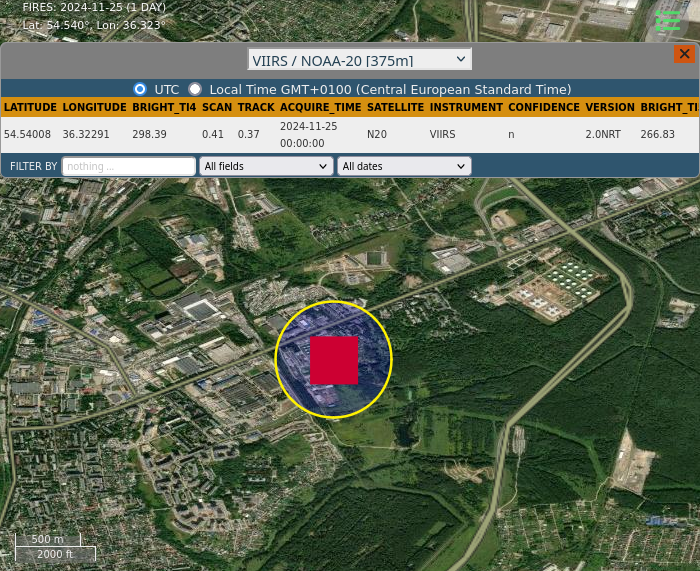
NASA's FIRMS detected fire at a Kaluga oil depot on 25 November 2024 00:00:00 (UTC)

Ukrainian drones set fire to the "Kaluganefteprodukt" oil depot in Kaluga with neighboring instrument manufacturer Typhoon reportedly also being attacked. The fire was detected by NASA FIRMS.

TASS reported that a British national was captured while fighting for Ukrainian forces in Kursk Oblast.

Geo-located footage showed that Russia had captured the town of Lycychne near Pokrovsk. Russian forces claimed to have captured the town of Zhovte in Donetsk Oblast.

=== 26 November ===
Two people were killed in a Russian missile attack on Sumy.

Russian forces captured the village of Petrivka in the Pokrovsk front. The Russian defense ministry claimed that Russian forces captured the town of Kopanky, southeast of Kupyansk and the town of Rozdolne in southern Donetsk Oblast.

=== 27 November ===
The Russian-installed head of Sevastopol claimed that two missiles and five drones were shot down over the city.

A private Russian aircraft conducting a scheduled aerial photography exercise was fired upon by security guards of an oil refinery in Salavat, Bashkortostan, who mistook it for a Ukrainian drone. The incident also led to air raid sirens being activated in the city. No damage or casualties were reported on the aircraft.

Ukrainian officials announced the recall of some 100,000 120mm mortar shells manufactured by Ukroboronprom after they were found to get "stuck in launchers and weren't exploding" according to soldiers, with only 1 out of 10 working.

=== 28 November ===
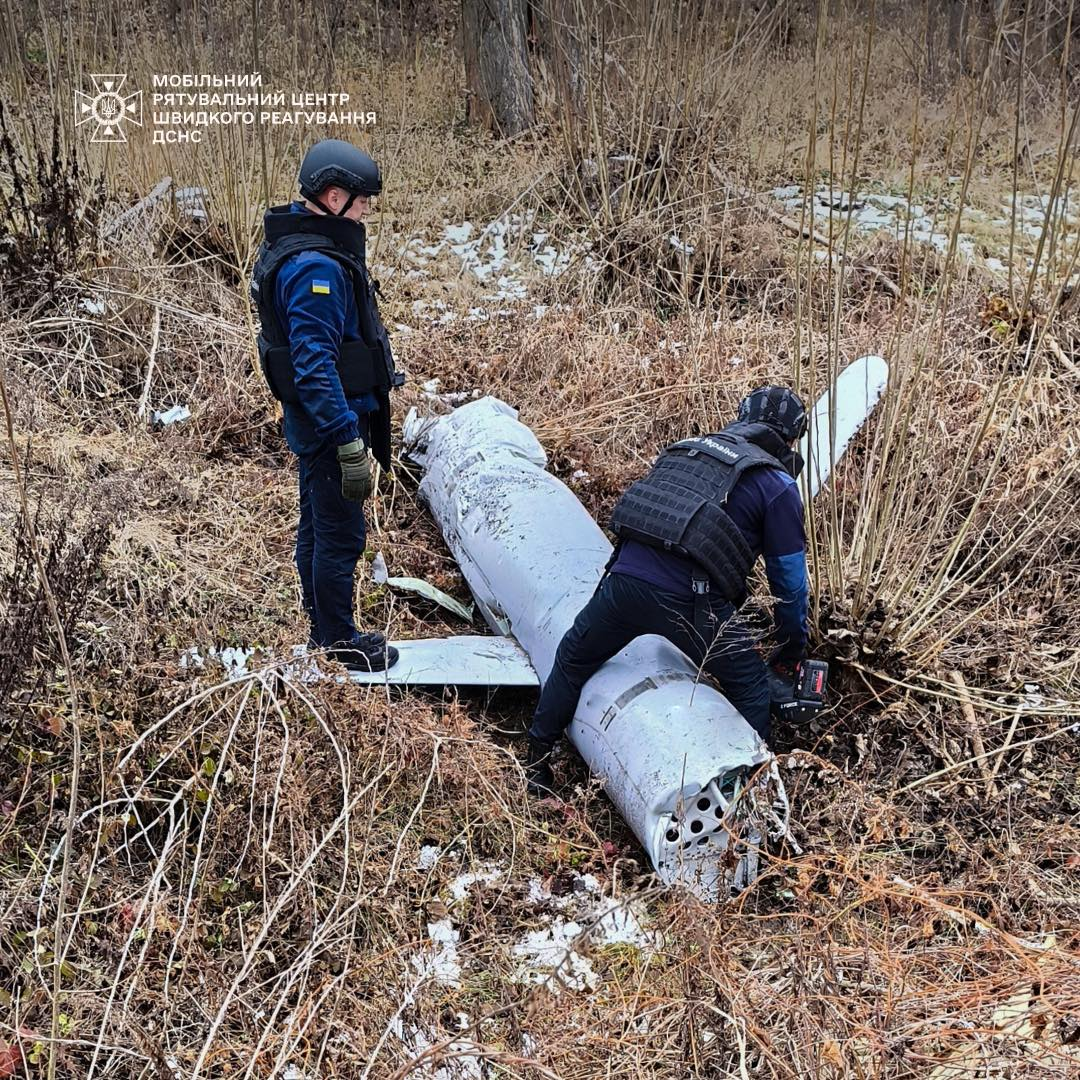
Remains of Russian missile Kh-55 in Kyiv after the attack

Russia launched a massive air attack on energy infrastructure across Ukraine, leaving at least one million people without electricity.

The HUR claimed to have destroyed two Russian 48Y6-K1 Podlet and a Kasta-2e2 radar stations near Kotovske, Crimea.

The governor of Krasnodar Krai claimed that one person was injured in a drone attack in Slavyansk-on-Kuban.

Geo-located footage showed that Russian forces captured the town of Pustynka, south of Pokrovsk.

=== 29 November ===
One person was killed in a Russian drone strike on Kherson.

The Ukrainian military claimed to have destroyed a radar station of a Russian Buk-M3 anti-aircraft missile system in occupied Zaporizhzhia Oblast and attacked an oil refinery in Rostov Oblast, causing fires.

The bodies of 502 Ukrainian soldiers killed in action were repatriated by Russia.

Zelenskyy appointed Major General Mykhailo Drapatyi as commander of the Ukrainian Ground Forces, replacing Oleksandr Pavliuk.

The Ukrainian general staff said that Russian forces suffered 2,030 personnel dead, wounded, missing and captured, adding that it was the highest losses Russia sustained in a single day and the first time Russian casualties crossed over 2,000.

Zelenskyy said that seven Russian missiles were downed by F-16s belonging to the Ukrainian Air Force.

=== 30 November ===
Four people were killed in a Russian missile attack on Tsarychanka, Dnipropetrovsk Oblast.

Ukrainian drones attacked the city of Kaspiysk, Dagestan. The Uytash Airport was closed for three hours.

The SBU charged Colonel-General Yevgeny Nikiforov, the commander of the "West" grouping of the Russian military, in absentia for ordering the August 2023 Chernihiv missile strike that killed seven people and injured 200 others.

A woman from Donetsk Oblast was sentenced to 15 years' imprisonment for aiding Russian airstrikes after she moved to Zhytomyr Oblast.

Ukraine's 3rd Assault Brigade destroyed a North Korean Bulsae-4 Anti-Tank Vehicle in Kharkiv Oblast by using a drone.

A Ukrainian HIMARS rocket, with a cluster warhead, struck elements of the 83rd Guards Air Assault Brigade killing and wounding at least 37 personnel in Kursk Oblast, including four officers. The attack occurred during a "ceremonial formation" marking the "anniversary of the formation of the brigade".

Geo-located footage showed that Russian forces had captured the town Yurivka, south of Pokrovsk.

== December 2024 ==
=== 1 December ===
Three people were killed in a Russian drone strike on a bus in Kherson.

Russian forces claimed to have captured the village of Novyi Komar in southern Donetsk Oblast.

=== 2 December ===
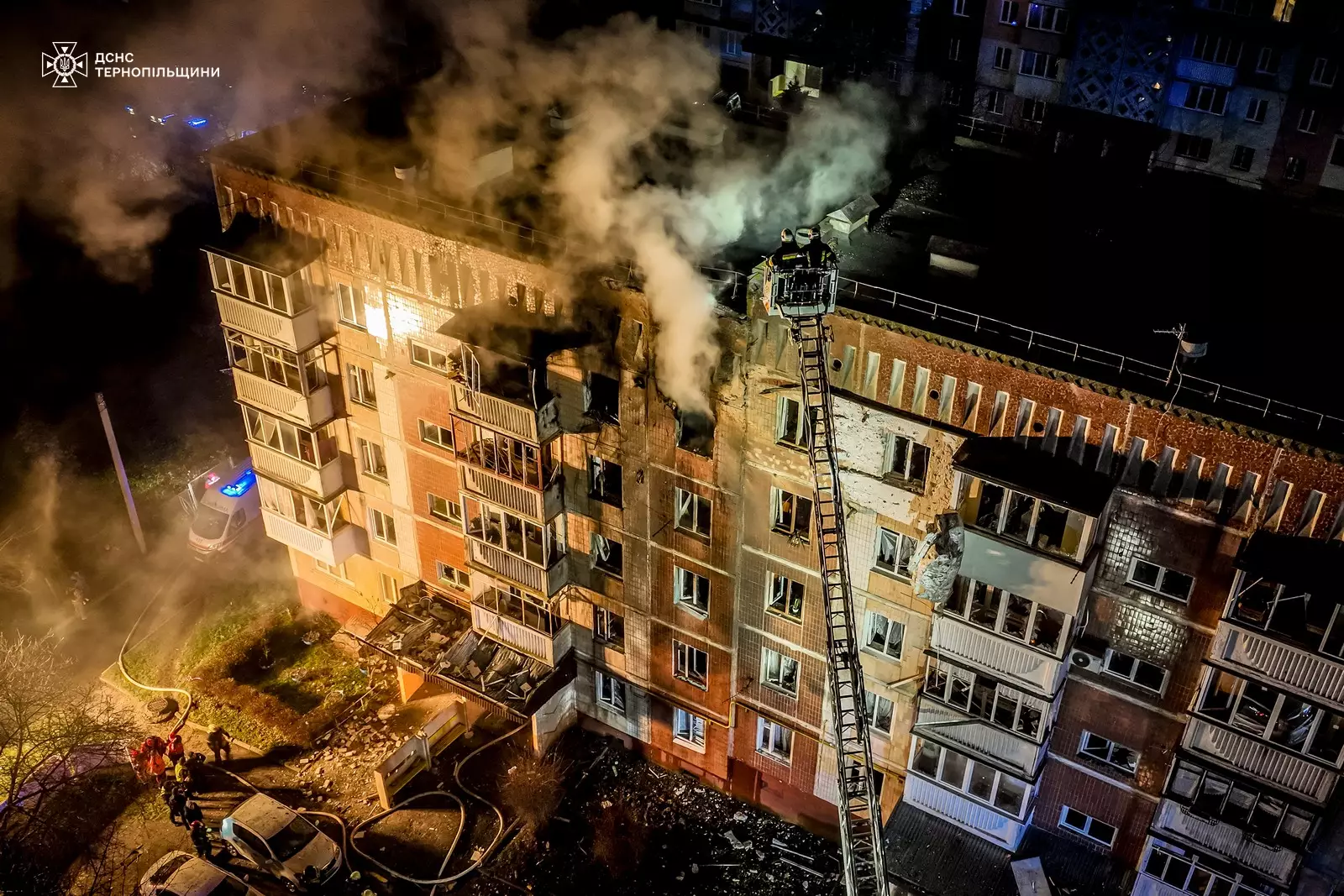
Residential building in Ternopil after the attack

One person was killed in a Russian drone attack on Ternopil.

German Chancellor Olaf Scholz visited Kyiv, announcing a new aid package of 650 million euros ($680 million) that included two IRIS-T systems, ten Leopard 1 tanks, generators and armoured vehicles.

The US announced a $725 million military aid package for Ukraine that included anti-aircraft, anti-tank and anti-personnel landmines, counter drone weapons and HIMARS ammunition.

=== 3 December ===
Russian drones attacked critical infrastructure in Ternopil and Rivne Oblasts. The Ukrainian Air Force said it shot down 22 of 28 drones launched overnight.

Geo-located footage showed that Ukrainian forces retook the village of Novomlynsk on the Oskil river and the village of Rozdolne in southern Donetsk Oblast.

=== 4 December ===
Ukrainian drones attacked the port of Novorossiysk and Dyagilevo air base, causing explosions. Twenty-five drones were downed by Russian air defences in six oblasts. Ukrainian drones also struck the Chechen capital Grozny, with explosions reported near the headquarters of the Akhmat Kadyrov Special Forces.

Ukraine announced the death of Yevhen Matveyev, the mayor of Dniprorudne, Zaporizhzhia Oblast who was arrested by Russian forces in the early days of the invasion in 2022 after his body was repatriated in an exchange. Ukrainian officials claimed that he had been killed via torture under Russian custody.

It was announced that the Palianytsia missile-drone had entered serial production.

U.S. Secretary of State Antony Blinken announced that Ukraine would receive $50 billion of funds from the US and Europe that were taken from Russian assets frozen after the full-scale invasion.

Russian forces claimed to have captured the towns of Novyi Trud and Stari Terny, both south of Pokrovsk, and Blahodatne in southern Donetsk Oblast.

=== 5 December ===
Ukrainian forces claimed to have retaken Novyi Komar.

Russian forces claimed to have taken the town of Novopustynka, south of Pokrovsk.

Atesh claimed to have cut a railway line between Moscow and Kursk, near the village of Chekhov, Moscow Oblast, by destroying a relay cabinet.

=== 6 December ===
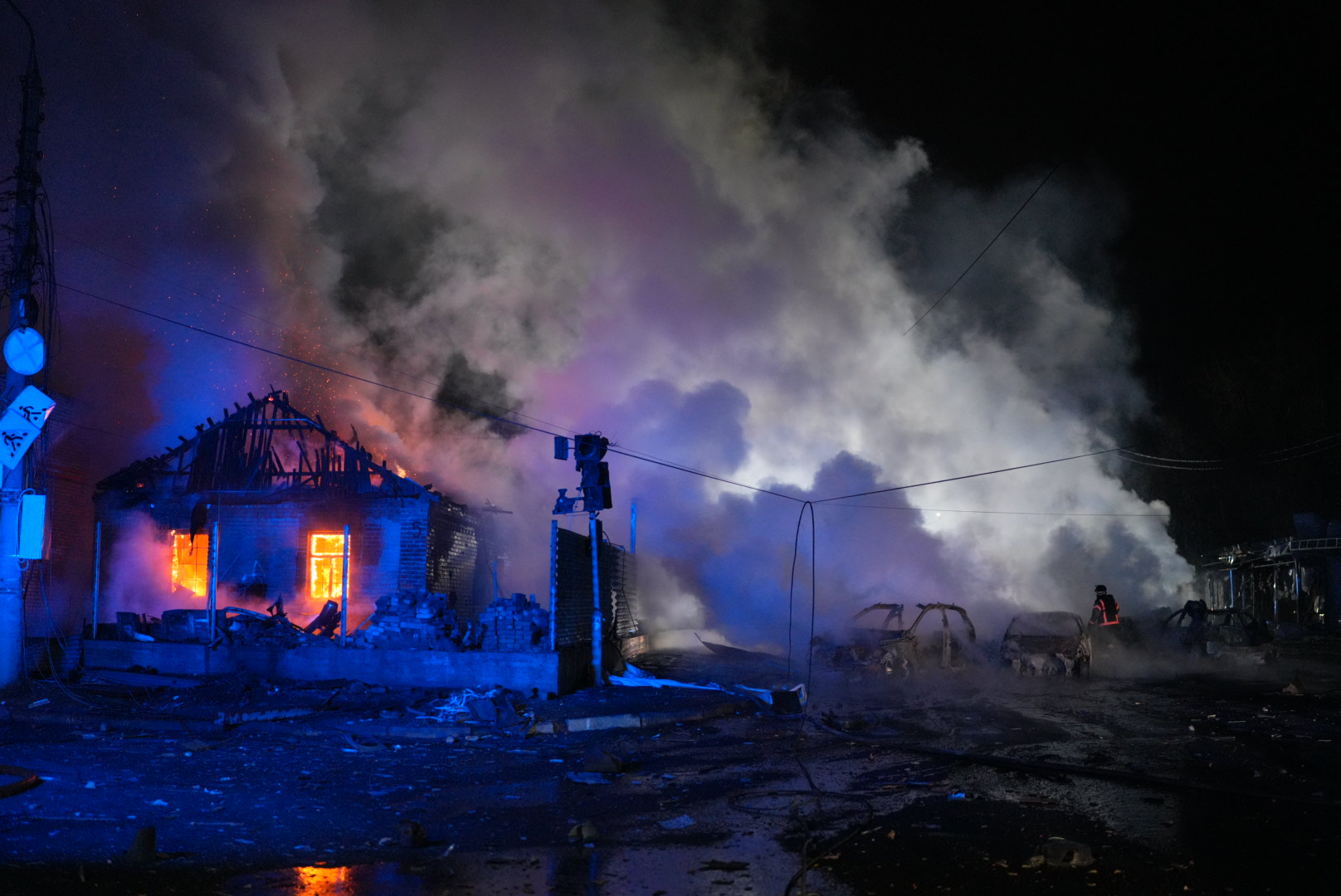
Destructions in Zaporizhzhia after the bombing

Ten people were killed in a Russian air attack on Zaporizhzhia. Three people were killed in a separate attack in Kryvyi Rih.

A drone attack was reported in Kerch, prompting the closure of the Crimean Bridge. According to the SBU, Russian helicopters and patrol vessels intercepted the drones, which were equipped with machine guns and fired on Russian helicopters causing damage and casualties. A drone also struck a barge "transporting military equipment and equipment" for the repairmen of the Crimean bridge.

Russia claimed to have taken the settlement of Sukhi Yaly, 13 kilometers southwest of Kurakhove.

=== 7 December ===
Ukrainian Vice-Admiral Oleksiy Neizhpapa said that Ukrainian naval drones struck a Russian-controlled gas platform in Crimea which held "surveillance systems". He also revealed footage of a new type of maritime attack drone which used an "unusual trimaran configuration".

Zelenskyy announced a new attack drone which entered serial production. Called Peklo (Hell), officially it is a missile-drone hybrid, with a range of up to 700 km, speed of up to 700 km/h and a warhead of no more than 50 kg, with work being done to make it resilient to electronic warfare.

Ukraine received its second batch of F-16s from Denmark.

The US government announced a military aid package worth some $988 million, which nearly halves the funds of the $2.21 billion remaining of the Ukraine Security Assistance Initiative. The package included spare parts for artillery, drones and ammunition for HIMARS.

Geo-located footage showed that Ukrainian forces retook the towns of Novaya Sorochina and Malaya Loknya in Kursk Oblast, while Russia claimed to have taken the village of Beretsky, near Kurakhove.

US Secretary of Defense Lloyd Austin claimed that Russia had suffered 700,000 casualties and spent $200 billion since the full-scale invasion of Ukraine.

=== 8 December ===
One person was killed in a Russian drone attack in Kherson Oblast.

US President-elect Donald Trump said 400,000 Ukrainian soldiers had been killed and seriously wounded so far during the war. Zelenskyy denied these figures, saying that 43,000 Ukrainian soldiers had been killed and 370,000 wounded but that "approximately 50%" of these soldiers had recovered and had returned to active duty. Zelenskyy said Russian casualty figures of 198,000 killed and over 550,000 wounded for 750,000 casualties.

SpaceX and the US Department of Defense announced an agreement to expand from 500 to 3000 Starshield terminals for Ukraine. Starshield is a more secure version of Starlink.

=== 9 December ===
Sergey Yevsiukov, head of the Olenivka prison colony, was killed by a car bomb in Donetsk. His wife was reportedly wounded, losing her leg in the explosion.

Russian presidential commissioner for human rights Tatiana Moskalkova announced that the remains of POWs killed in the 2024 Korochansky Ilyushin Il-76 crash in January had been returned to Ukraine following an exchange but did not give further details.

Ukrainian forces stated that Russian forces captured the towns of Vyshneve and Pershotravneve, west of Svatove. Russian forces claimed to have captured the town of Shevchenko, south of Pokrovsk.

=== 10 December ===
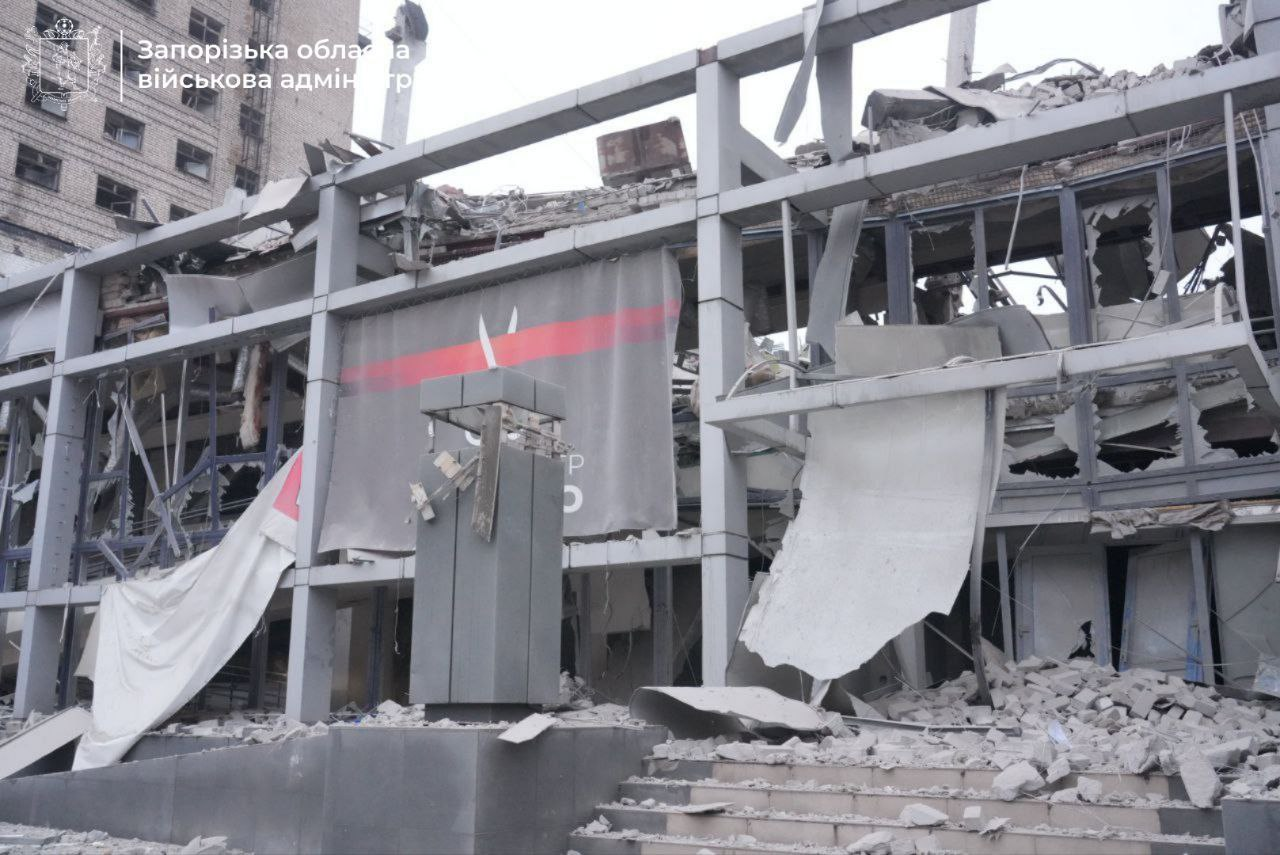
Business center in Zaporizhzhia after missile attack on 10 December

Ten people were killed in a Russian airstrike in Zaporizhzhia. A private clinic was destroyed, among other buildings.

Explosions were reported in Yenakiieve, occupied Donetsk Oblast, prompting evacuations.

Zelenskyy accused Russian forces of launching a drone that severely damaged an IAEA service vehicle that was heading to the Zaporizhzhia Nuclear Power Plant.

The FSB said it arrested a dual Russian-German citizen in Nizhny Novgorod on suspicion of plotting sabotage attacks on railways for Ukraine.

Atesh claimed that Russian soldiers were sabotaging boats and equipment intended for seizing the Dnipro River islands.

Russian forces claimed to have recaptured the town of Novoivanovka in Kursk Oblast.

It was reported that Russian forces crossed the border into Sumy Oblast near the village of Oleksandriya, which was denied by regional governor Volodymyr Artyukh.

=== 11 December ===
The Governor of Rostov Oblast, Yury Slyusar, and the mayor of Taganrog Svetlana Kambulova claimed that a Ukrainian missile damaged a boiler plant at a power station in the city without causing casualties. Fourteen cars in the parking lot caught fire, while heating to 27 apartment buildings was lost. Drones also reportedly set fire to an oil depot in Bryansk Oblast, where 14 drones were shot down.

DeepState reported that Russian forces were three kilometres away from the southern edge of Pokrovsk.

A court in Russian-occupied Donetsk sentenced nine Ukrainian soldiers captured during the Siege of Mariupol in 2022 to sentences ranging from 24 years' imprisonment to life for shelling the village of Staryi Krym.

Ukrainian Finance Minister Serhiy Marchenko said that his country possessed "enough funds and ammunition" to resist Russia until mid-2025, even if the US cut aid.

The US government announced a $20 billion loan to Ukraine as its share of a G7 loan valued at $50 billion.

Geo-located footage showed that Russian forces recaptured the town of Plekhovo in Kursk Oblast, while Ukrainian forces recaptured the town of Kopanky near the Oskil River.

=== 12 December ===
Ukrainian drones struck a Russian police barracks in Grozny, according to Chechen leader Ramzan Kadyrov, causing property damage and light injuries to four guards.

Deputy Chief Designer at the Mars Design Bureau, Mikhail Shatsky, was "liquidated" by HUR operatives in the Kuzminsky Forest Park in Moscow. As head of software his job involved modernising Kh-59 and Kh-69 missiles as well as creating new UAVs.

A court-martial in Moscow sentenced two Ukrainian soldiers captured in Kursk Oblast to up to 15 years' imprisonment for attacks on Russian soldiers and civilians.

A Ukrainian court sentenced Vyacheslav Volodin, chair of the State Duma of Russia, to 15 years' imprisonment in absentia for his support of pro-Russian separatists in eastern Ukraine and the annexation of Russian-occupied territories.

Geo-located footage showed that Russian forces had captured the towns of Pushkine and Novotrlitske, both south of Pokrovsk, and Kalynivka, east of Chasiv Yar. Russian forces also claimed to have captured the town of Zorya, south of Pokrovsk.

The HUR claimed responsibility for the disabling of an An-72 at the Ostafyevo airfield in Moscow.

=== 13 December ===
Russia launched a massive air attack using around 93 missiles and 200 drones on energy infrastructure across Ukraine, causing extensive blackouts. Ukrainian forces claimed to have intercepted 81 missiles. Eleven cruise missiles were shot down by F-16s.

Ukrainian commander Colonel-General Oleksandr Syrskyi dismissed the commander of the Ukrainian Donetsk Operational and Tactical Group, Oleksandr Lutsenko, with Brigadier General Oleksandr Tarnavskyi due to recent Russian advances towards Pokrovsk.

Geo-located footage showed that Ukrainian forces had lost control over the towns of Uspenivka, Hannivka, Trudove, Romanivka and Veselyi Hai, all located in southern Donetsk Oblast.

A Ukrainian court sentenced a woman to 14 years' imprisonment for writing false reports used by Russia to justify its invasion.

The Ukrainian Air Force claimed a F-16 shot down 6 Russian cruise missiles near Kyiv.

=== 14 December ===
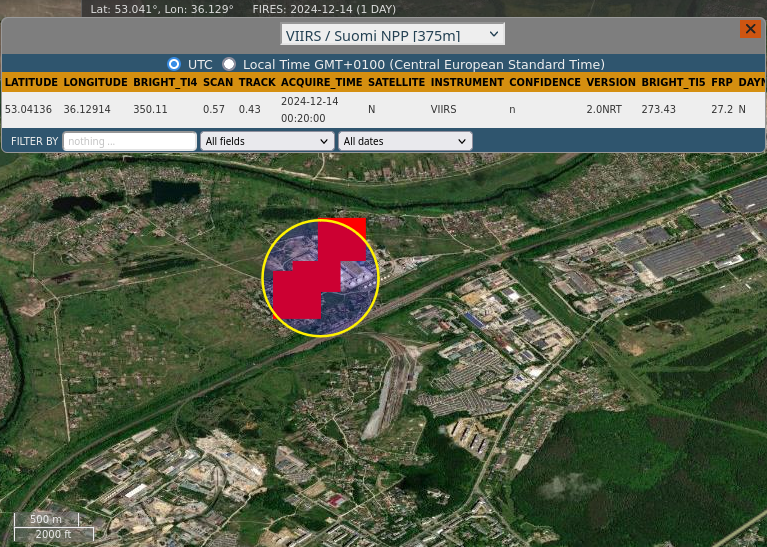
NASA's FIRMS detected fire at an Oryol oil depot on 14 December 2024 00:20:00 (UTC)

One person was killed in an explosion in Dnipro. The SBU said that the incident was a terrorist attack and arrested a suspect whom it accused of working for Russia.

An oil depot in Oryol was attacked and set on fire by Ukrainian drones. Russian social media reported explosions and the governor confirmed a fire had broken out at an "infrastructure facility".

The HUR claimed credit for two attacks. On 14 December a Su-30 fighter based in Krymsk, Krasnodar Krai was set on fire. On 13 December a fire in Krasnodar put three locomotives "out of commission".

The HUR claimed that eight soldiers from a Chechen Akhmat unit were killed by North Korean soldiers during a "friendly fire" incident in Kursk Oblast, which it blamed on the language barrier. It claimed that, as of 14 December 200 Russian and North Korean personnel were reported as casualties from fighting against Ukrainian forces in Kursk, specifically from drone strikes.

An A22 Foxbat drone was used to strike a target in Grozny, believed to be the "OMON base and second regiment" barracks from which soldiers are sent to Ukraine. Commander of the second regiment, Zamid Chalaev, denied a drone strike, saying a drone was shot down.

Ukrainian intelligence and special forces sabotaged a railway line near Oleksyivka, Zaporizhzhia Oblast and derailed a train with explosives, drones set fire to some 40 railway cars loaded with fuel. HIMARS rockets then struck the remaining fuel and equipment.

=== 15 December ===
Russian forces claimed to have captured the town of Dvorichna, west of the Oskil river. Geo-located footage showed that Russian forces had recaptured the villages of Nechaev and Nizhnyaya Parovaya in Kursk Oblast.

=== 16 December ===
Ukraine charged Russian NBC Protection Troops commander Lieutenant-General Igor Kirillov in absentia for using banned chemical weapons in the front.

A Russian ammunition dump was destroyed by Ukrainian drones near the village of Markyne, Donetsk Oblast.

The HUR claimed that at least 30 North Korean soldiers were killed and wounded during clashes with Ukrainian soldiers in Kursk Oblast on 14–15 December.

Russian defence minister Andrei Belousov announced that Russia would create an "unmanned systems troops" as a response to the Ukrainian establishment of the Unmanned Systems Forces earlier this year.

=== 17 December ===
Russian NBC Protection Troops commander Lieutenant-General Igor Kirillov was killed along with an assistant in a scooter bombing in Moscow. The FSB arrested an Uzbek national who it claimed was recruited by Ukrainian intelligence agencies to conduct the killings.

Ukraine claimed to have developed a laser that can destroy targets at a range of two kilometres and travel at up to 200 kilometres per hour. Called "Tryzub" (Trident), Ukraine said it was only the fifth country to develop a laser-based weapon.

A Ukrainian military observer claimed that Russian forces had captured the town of Zelenivka in Donetsk Oblast.

=== 18 December ===
According to the local governor, some ten Storm Shadow missiles were fired at a plant in Rostov Oblast. Russian forces tried to shoot them down, with falling debris damaging houses. According to some reports the plant was used to make rocket fuel for missiles including Kornet Anti-Tank Guided Missiles and Iskander-M ballistic missiles.

According to Russian milblogger Ilya Tumanov, under the name fighterbomber, a Ka-52 was shot down due to "friendly fire". Both crew were reported killed.

Russian forces claimed to have captured the towns of Dachenske and Hihant in Donetsk Oblast.

UK Secretary for Defence John Healey announced a new £225 million ($283 million) military aid program package, including support for the Ukrainian navy and counter-drone weapons.

Rheinmetall announced that it would supply Ukraine with 20 Marder IFVs.

=== 19 December ===
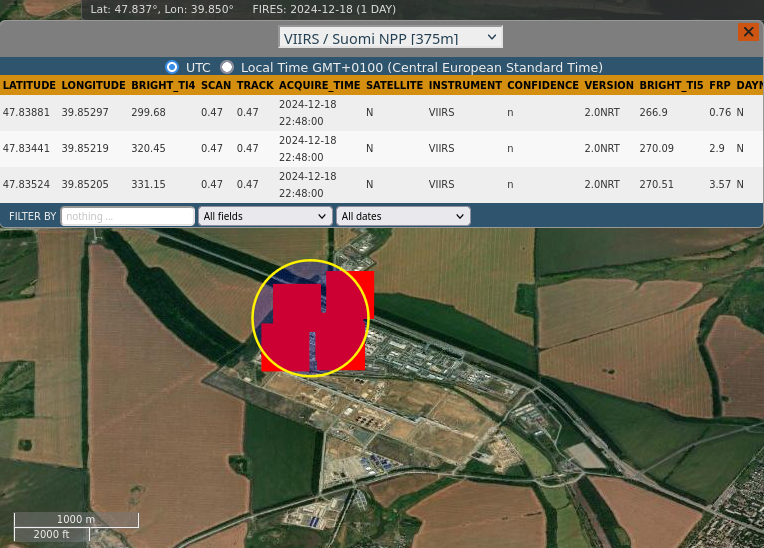
NASA's FIRMS detected fire at the Novoshakhtinsk oil refinery on 18 December 2024 22:48:00 (UTC)

Geo-located footage showed that Russian forces captured the town of Novoivanovka in Kursk Oblast, while a Ukrainian military observer claimed that Russian forces captured the towns of Rozdolne, Kostyantynopolske, Sukhi Yali, and recaptured the town of Novyi Komar, all located in southern Donetsk Oblast.

The Novoshakhtinsk Refinery in Rostov Oblast was struck by Ukrainian drones and missiles, according to the General Staff of the Armed Forces of Ukraine. The involvement of the Ukrainian Navy and recent attacks near the facility pointed to the use of Neptune missiles.

Ukraine accused Russia of conducting a massive cyberattack on government websites.

South Korean MP Lee Sung-kwon told reporters after an intelligence briefing that 100 North Korean soldiers were killed and over 1,000 wounded during fighting in Kursk Oblast.

Ukraine and Rheinmetall signed a nine-million euro contract to supply Ukraine with tens of thousands of 155mm artillery propellant charge modules.

=== 20 December ===
Destructions in Kyiv after the attack

One person was killed in a Russian missile attack on Kyiv that also damaged the building housing the embassies of Portugal, Argentina, Albania and Montenegro. Another was killed in an airstrike on Kherson.

Authorities in Kursk Oblast claimed that six people were killed in a Ukrainian missile strike on Rylsk.

The bodies of 503 Ukrainian soldiers killed in action were repatriated from Russia and occupied areas of Ukraine.

Ukraine charged Colonel-General Alexei Kim, a deputy chief in the Russian General Staff, with ordering the 24 August missile strike on Kramatorsk that killed and injured members of a Reuters team.

The Ukrainian 13th Khartiia Brigade claimed to have assaulted Russian positions near Lyptsi with only "robotic and unmanned equipment" and no infantry soldiers for the first time.

=== 21 December ===
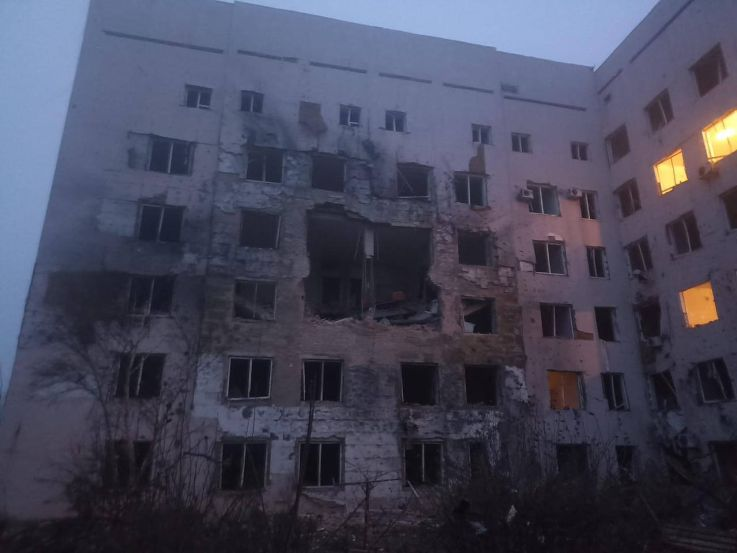
Kherson Regional Oncology Center after a strike with two guided bombs

Explosions were reported in the Russian city of Sochi as air defences intercepted Ukrainian drones. Cars were damaged and windows were reported broken.

Residential buildings in Kazan were struck by Ukrainian drones, including the "Azure Skies" residential complex. An industrial building was also reported damaged, while one drone was said to have been shot down.

=== 22 December ===
Russia claimed to have taken the villages of Lozova in Kharkiv Oblast, Sontsivka near Kurakhove, and Kruglenkoye in Kursk Oblast.

The governor of Oryol Oblast claimed that an oil refinery near Oryol was set on fire by a Ukrainian drone attack.

Video on social media showed 32-year old Australian citizen Oscar Jenkins captured by Russian forces near Kramatorsk.

=== 23 December ===
Russia claimed to have taken the village of Storozheve, Donetsk Oblast near Velyka Novosilka.

The HUR said that a "mysterious fire" caused $16 million damage to a factory in the Alabuga Special Economic Zone, in the Russian republic of Tatarstan, that made parts for Shahed-136 drones. Its inventory was estimated to include 65 fuselages and engines, navigation systems, and thermal imaging cameras for the production of 400 more drones.

Zelenskyy claimed that North Korean forces had suffered more than 3,000 casualties in Kursk Oblast.

A unit of the Polish-trained Ukrainian Legion was deployed to Ukraine for combat.

The German government announced another military aid package for Ukraine that included 15 Leopard 1A5 tanks, two Gepards, two TRML-4D radars, two IRIS-T missile launchers, two Patriot missile launchers and 50,000 155mm shells.

=== 24 December ===
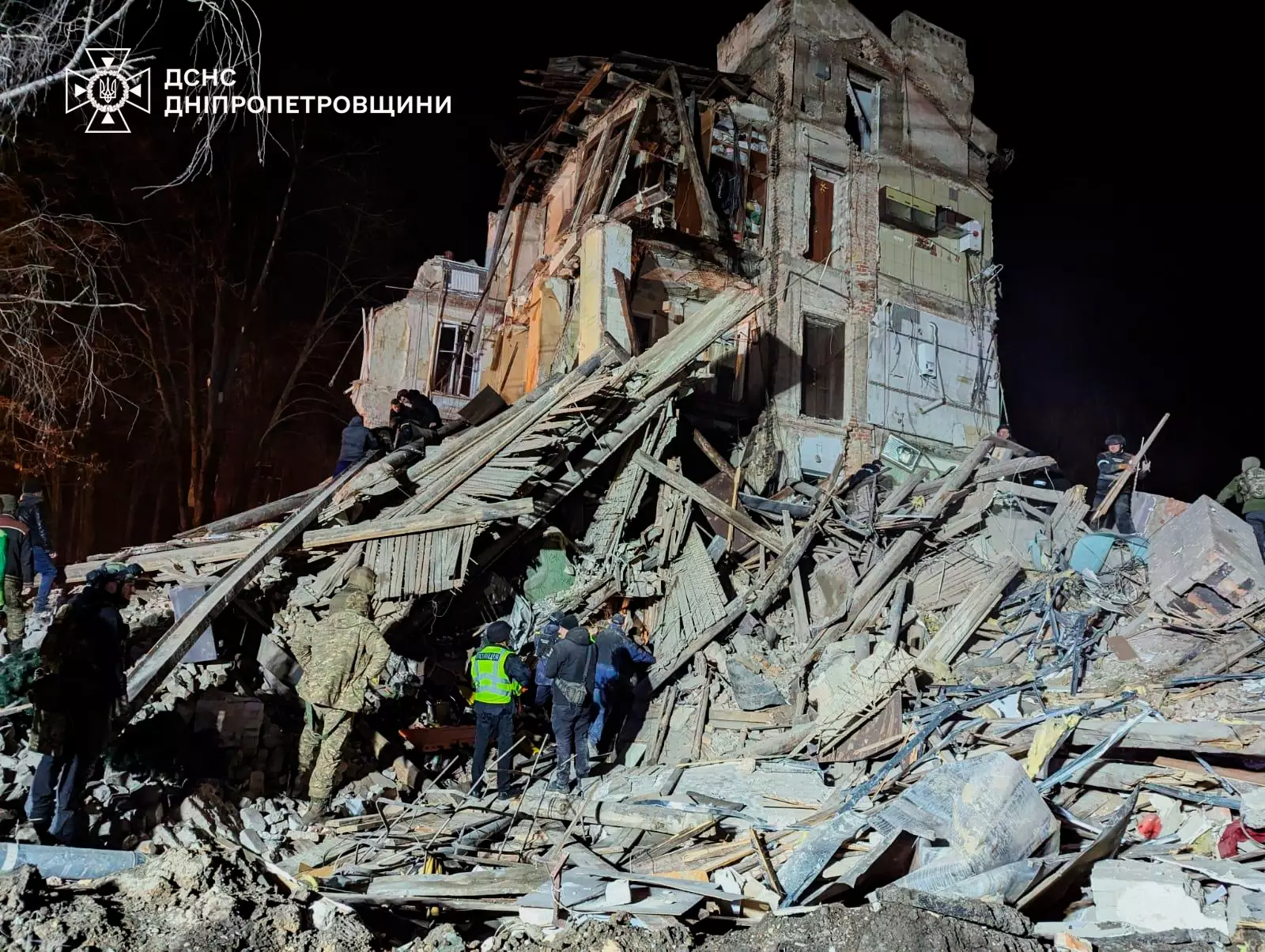
Residential building in Kryvyi Rih after the attack

One person was killed in a Russian missile attack in Kryvyi Rih.

Vasyl Nechet, the Russian-installed head of Berdiansk, was injured in a car bombing.

The governor of Rostov Oblast claimed that Ukrainian drones struck Millerovo.

Latvia transferred some 612 cars that were confiscated from drunk drivers to Ukraine, some of which were to be transferred to military units.

A Russian ZALA drone damaged a Russian Su-25 over Donetsk.

Geo-located footage showed that Russian forces had captured Storozheve, while Russian forces claimed to have captured the towns of Ukrainka and Novoolenivka near Pokrovsk.

=== 25 December ===
Russia launched a massive missile and drone attack across Ukraine, killing one person in Dnipropetrovsk Oblast.

Ukrainian forces claimed to have struck the command post of the Russian 810th Guards Naval Infantry Brigade in Lgov, Kursk Oblast, killing 18 soldiers. The regional governor claimed that four people were killed by Ukrainian shelling on the town.

Ukrainian officials claimed that an Azerbaijan Airlines aircraft flying from Baku to Grozny was shot down by Russian air defences after being confused with a drone during an attack in Grozny. The crash killed 38 people and injured 29 others.

In Vladikavkaz, North Ossetia-Alania, one person was killed after a drone crashed into a shopping mall, causing a fire. Another drone was shot down in Malgobek, Ingushetia.

Russian forces claimed to have captured the town of Zahryzove near the Oskil river.

=== 26 December ===
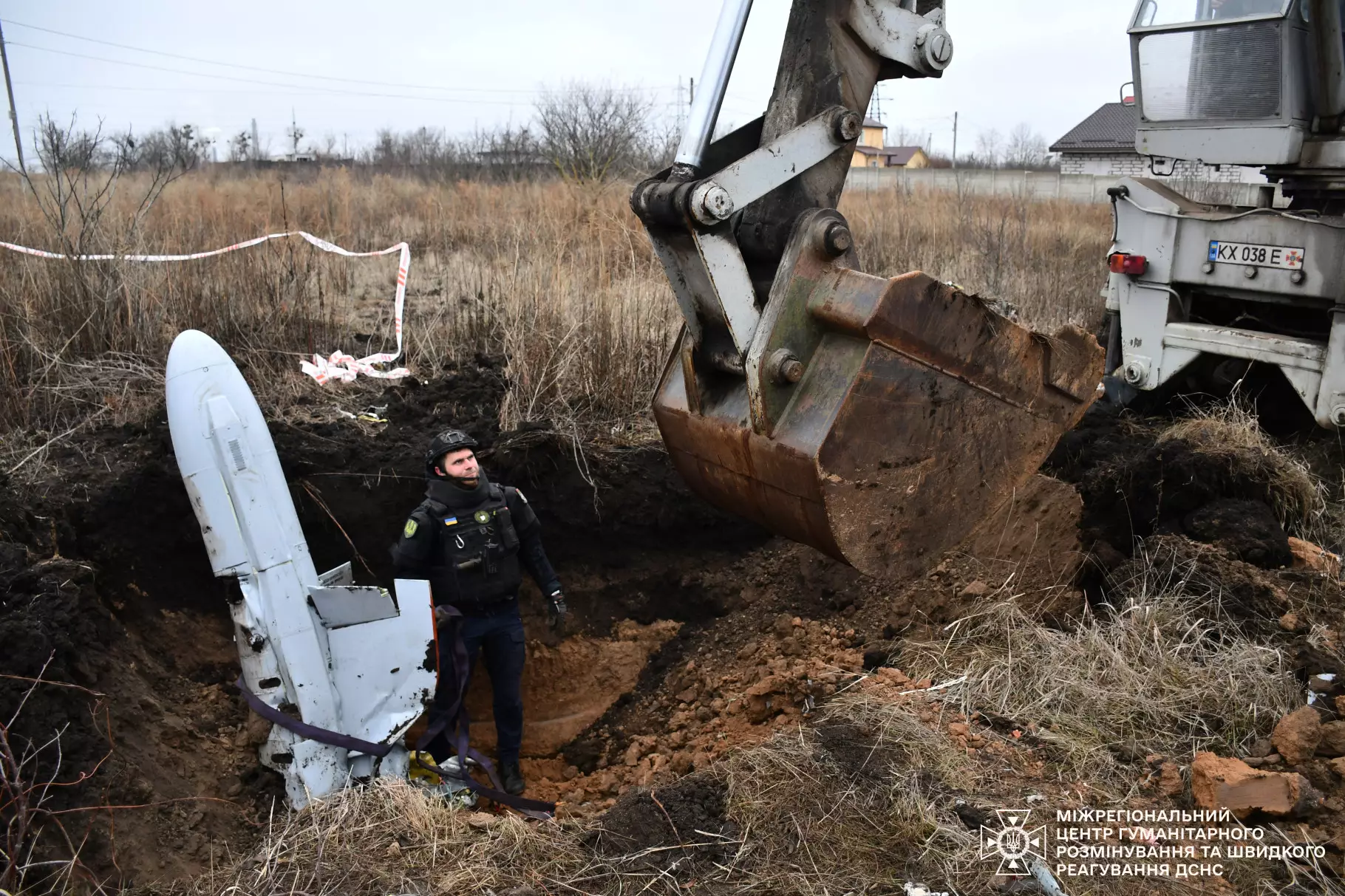
Removing of a missile Kh-59 from the territory of a private house in Kharkiv

A Ukrainian naval drone damaged the Russian tug Fedor Uryupin near Chornomorske in Crimea.

The Ukrainian Air Force claimed to have struck a fuel plant for ballistic missiles in Kamensk-Shakhtinsky, Rostov Oblast and a drone facility in Oryol Oblast. Ukraine said that the drone facility strike killed nine Russian servicemembers and "significantly reduced" Russia's ability to conduct Shahed drone strikes.

The ISW assessed that Russian forces had captured the city of Kurakhove in Donetsk Oblast in recent days.

The Ukrainian prosecutor-general's office arrested a platoon commander with the 211th Pontoon Bridge Brigade. The officer, believed to be Vladyslav Pastukh, was charged with of "abuse of authority by a military official" rising from allegations that he was "beating and humiliating subordinates" under his command.

=== 27 December ===
The South Korean National Intelligence Service said that a North Korean soldier had been taken prisoner by Ukrainian forces for the first time in Kursk Oblast. However, the soldier was reported to have died later in the day from injuries sustained in combat.

A Ukrainian HIMARS strike on a Russian command post in Zaporizhzhia Oblast killed three captains and destroyed five vehicles.

The Russian Ministry of Defense claimed that Russian forces had captured the town of Ivanivka in northern Donetsk Oblast.

The first batch of Ukrainian pilots and ground crew finished training with the French Air Force on Mirage 2000-5Fs.

=== 28 December ===
In Russia, the governor of Voronezh Oblast claimed that a section of railway was damaged by drone debris.

=== 30 December ===
Russian-installed officials in Kherson Oblast claimed that a doctor was killed while another was injured in a Ukrainian drone strike on a hospital in Oleshky.

Ukrainian officials claimed that partisans set fire to two trains in Moscow Oblast that were heading to occupied territories of Ukraine.

Russia and Ukraine conducted a prisoner exchange following mediation by the UAE. Zelenskyy said that 189 Ukrainians were released, while the Russian defence ministry said that 150 Ukrainians were exchanged for the same number of Russians.

A court in Ukraine convicted and sentenced a former police officer from Zaporizhzhia to 15 years' imprisonment for treason in sharing locations of air defense units with Russia.

Zelenskyy appointed human rights activist Olha Reshetylova to become the first military ombudsman of Ukraine as part of efforts to address issues involving Ukrainian military personnel.

President Biden announced a military aid package to Ukraine valued at US$2.5 billion.

The Unmanned Systems Forces claimed to have destroyed a Russian Buk-M1-2 in Zaporizhzhia Oblast.

A section of the Druzhba pipeline was attacked by Ukrainian drones in the village of Mamay, Bryansk Oblast. A "technical building" was partially destroyed.

Russian forces claimed to have captured the town of Agronom in Kursk Oblast and Vovkove, south of Pokrovsk. Geo-located footage showed that Ukrainian forces retook the town of Kruglenkoye in Kursk Oblast.

The acting governor of Kursk Oblast reported another Ukrainian strike on Lgov.

=== 31 December ===
MAGURA V5 drone targeting Russian Mil Mi-8 helicopter

Explosions were reported at Kozacha Bay, Crimea. The Russian-appointed governor, Mikhail Razvozhayev, stated that two drones had been downed over Sevastopol. Locals reported the destruction of a Tor missile system and explosions in Sevastopol caused by naval drones.

In Smolensk Oblast, an oil depot in Yartsevsky District was set on fire following a drone attack.

The HUR released video purportedly showing the downing of an Mi-8 helicopter while claiming that near Cape Tarkhankut a Magura V5 armed with R-73 missiles shot down two helicopters and damaged a third.

Russian forces claimed to have captured the town of Vozdvyzhenka, while a Ukrainian military observer claimed that Russian forces captured the town of Novoyelyzavetivka, both located in Donetsk Oblast.

== See also ==
- 2024 in Russia
- 2024 in Ukraine
- Bibliography of Ukrainian history
- List of wars involving Russia
- Outline of the Russo-Ukrainian War
- War crimes in the Russian invasion of Ukraine
