= Battle of Kurakhove =

Battle in the Russo-Ukrainian war in 2024

- Part of the eastern front of the Russian invasion of Ukraine
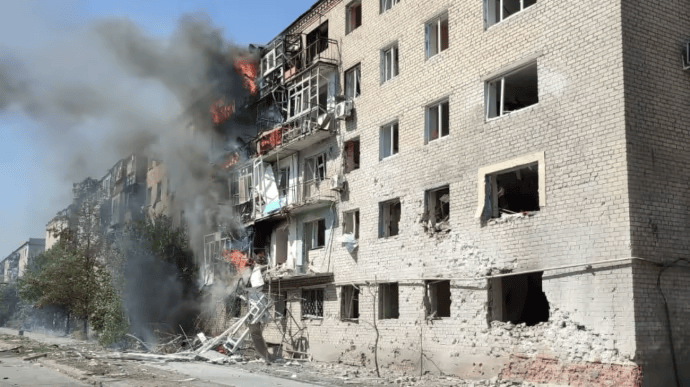
- Damaged apartment in Kurakhove after being shelled
Date	16 October 2024 (Note: The settlement of Ostrivske to the east of Kurakhove was captured on 15 October, with fighting ensuing within the administrative boundaries of Kurakhove on 16 October. Russian forces were not confirmed to have gained a foothold in the main district of Kurakhove until 29 October, when they entered it from the east.) – early January 2025
Location	Kurakhove and proximity, Pokrovsk Raion, Donetsk Oblast, Ukraine
Result	Russian victory
Territorial changes	Russian forces capture the city in late December 2024 and take the Kurakhove Power Station by early January 2025; Russian forces capture adjacent towns of Hirnyk and Kurakhivka

Belligerents
Russia	Ukraine

Units involved
51st Combined Arms Army; 150th Motor Rifle Division; 90th Guards Tank Division	46th Airmobile Brigade

Casualties and losses
- § Casualty claims

The Battle of Kurakhove was a battle for control of the city of Kurakhove and the surrounding area between the Russian Armed Forces and the Ukrainian Armed Forces.

The battle for the city began on 16 October 2024, when Russian forces' offensive operation in the direction of Kurakhove succeeded in capturing the nearby settlement of Ostrivske on 15 October, thus beginning the battle as Russian forces entered the administrative limits of the city from the north-eastern direction on the eastern bank of the Kurakhove reservoir. The battle was part of the broader Russian offensive in the Donbas and Donetsk Oblast, aiming to capture economic and defensive stronghold cities in southern Donetsk Oblast, among them Kurakhove and Pokrovsk. Russian forces captured the city's administrative boundaries in late December, and reportedly took control over the Kurakhove Power Station in early January 2025.

== Background ==
In late August to September 2024, after breakthroughs towards Pokrovsk, the Russian forces regrouped north, south and east of Kurakhove, attempting to encircle the Ukrainian troops – the current main focus of Russian forces in the city's direction. The fighting shifted to the nearby cities of Ukrainsk (located about 15 km north of Kurakhove), Hirnyk and Selydove. Encirclement concerns are growing, particularly further south, where roads have become impassable and businesses have closed. The logistics have been heavily affected, with supply routes slowed and evacuation of the wounded becoming more challenging due to cut roads to Pokrovsk. The city population decreased to ~5,000 in September. According to soldiers, fighting in the Kurakhove area is challenging due to the flat terrain. By 16 October, Russian forces occupied the village of Ostrivske on the eastern bank of the Kurakhove reservoir, threatening Kurakhove with encirclement.

Russian forces entered the administrative limits of Kurakhove on the east bank of the Kurakhove reservoir, near Ostrivke, on 16 October, after becoming embattled during the capture of Ostrivske. From the east, the Russian forces then became active near Kurakhove proper on 29 October.

== Strength ==
While the strength of Ukrainian forces defending Kurakhove was not publicly known, different sources for the strength of Russian forces in the area have offered widely varying reports. Military observer Kostiantyn Mashovets claimed in November 2024 that 70,000 Russian soldiers had been concentrated in the direction of Kurakhove. However, Nazar Voloshin, spokesperson of the Khortytsia force grouping, claimed in late December that 35,000–36,000 Russian soldiers had concentrated around Kurakhove over the preceding months.

== Battle ==
During the month of October the Russian Army launched assaults towards the city of Kurakhove from three directions; from the city of Hirnyk in the north towards the Kurakhove reservoir, from Krasnohorivka in the east and from Vuhledar in the south.

In the northern direction the advances of the Russian forces were accelerated with the capture of the city of Hirnyk by 29 October. This capture was followed by an assault on the neighboring town of Kurakhivka to the south and a push west of Hirnyk where Russian forces advanced into the village of Novoselydivka. The Russian Ministry of Defense announced the full control over Kurakhivka on 2 November. At the same time further south Russian forces started a three speared attack from Vuhledar northwards seizing the villages of Bohoyavlenka and Novoukrainka by 30 October. The advances continued in the northwest with the capture of Shakhtarske and Yasna Polyana a few days later. It was reported by Bloomberg that, with the advances around Kurakhove together with the capture of Selydove, this week Russia was able to seize the most Ukrainian land of the year 2024 so far.

In early November, an estimated 700–1,000 people remained in Kurakhove, and were living without basic utilities, while Russian forces stood under 3 kilometres from the city center. Many crucial facilities were destroyed by heavy shelling, with only one food store operational. Russian encirclement efforts of the city continued, and according to the city's head of police, its success would leave Kurakhove practically indefensible. In a similar vein, David Axe claimed in early November that in the village of Illinka south of Kurakhove, Ukraine's "battered" 79th Air Assault Brigade was "barely holding on" to its defensive line 6 miles (9.7 km), and that the loss of Illinka would likely lead to the loss of Kurakhove.

On 11 November, the Kurakhove Reservoir dam, near the village of Stari Terny, was destroyed, causing water to flow into the Vovcha River and posing a threat of flooding for residents of villages on the river. According to DeepState, the Russian effort to reach the logistical routes near Kurakhove and surround the city was gaining momentum, and it was "only a matter of time" before the city was captured.

On 14 November, Ukrainian military observer Kostyantyn Mashovets claimed that Russia had concentrated 70,000 personnel against Kurakhove, including units from the 41st and 51st Combined Arms armies.

By 25 November, Russian forces had reached Pobiedy Street in central Kurakhove, also closing in on the salient southeast of Kurakhove.

On 29 November, Ukrainian Commander-in-Chief Oleksandr Syrskyi announced that troop contingents in the Pokrovsk and Kurakhove sectors would get additional reserves, ammunition, weapons, military equipment, calling it the most intense area of fighting on the front. A few days later, Zelenskyy affirmed this, stating that the Donetsk direction requires significant reinforcements – appealing to Western partners to timely fulfill weapon delivery commitments.

Russian forces captured the villages of Romanivka and Hannivka southeast of Kurakhove in early December.

A Russian source said that 1,500 Ukrainian soldiers were facing imminent encirclement south of Kurakhove on 6 December.

By 7 December 2024, Russian forces had taken control of the entire northern bank of the Kurakhove Reservoir, including the area around Stari Terny. Their push southward across the dam poses a serious threat to the last remaining supply route for Ukrainian forces in Kurakhove. The distance between Russian forward positions to the north and south of Kurakhove had narrowed to less than 10 kilometers, further reducing the gap needed to close the encirclement around the town. Intense fighting continued in the centre of the city. Russian forces likely also captured the village of Sukhi Yaly along the Sukhi Yaly River, which serves as the Ukrainians' defensive line within the salient of the southeastern sector of Kurakhove. Within the salient, the settlement of Illinka was occupied by Russian forces, and battles were ongoing on the outskirts of Romanivka and Uspenivka.

On 12 December, the situation at the "Uspenivka pocket", the embattled sector southeast of Kurakhove, worsened. The villages of Yelyzavetivka, Romanivka, Veselyi Hai and Hannivka were located within a pocket – the sole supply line being fiercely embattled, guarded only by Ukrainian contingents in the partially controlled settlements of Trudove and Uspenivka. Russian forces tried to break through from all directions, focusing on Uspenivka, which was at risk of being completely surrounded. DeepStateMap.Live cited inaction and unclear actions by the Donetsk Operational Tactical Group, a lack of proper coordination, as well as a significant advantage of manpower on the Russian side, as reasons for the situation. According to defence analyst Ian Matveev (Anti-Corruption Foundation), the escape routes in this pocket had been cut off and were being fought over. According to him, Ukrainian commanders kept their forces there despite the high risk, as their goal was to hold off the Russian advance as long as possible. Matveev questioned risking another potential encirclement at Kurakhove proper, as Ukrainian soldiers there are also "only one step away from being surrounded", though they did hold the industrial area and western limits of the city. The same day, footage was published that confirmed further Russian advances in southwestern Kurakhove, and indicated that advances along the N-15 highway had been made prior to the entrance into the southern part of the city.

On 13 December, the pocket around Uspenivka collapsed, and Ukrainian forces lost control over Uspenivka and the settlements east of it. Russian milbloggers said that some Ukrainian soldiers had been encircled in the process. According to the ISW, the closure of the pocket granted Russian forces the ability to begin assaults towards Dachne, west of Kurakhove, and Zelenivka, near Uspenivka.

On 14 December, Russian forces made further advances inside Kurakhove, with their forces reaching the administration building in the western part of the city and hoisting the Russian flag on it. By 21 December, Russian forces controlled all urban areas of the city, with the exception of the industrial area around the Kurakhove Power Station. Russian attempts to encircle the city and its surrounding areas by cutting off the main road leading out to the west continued.

The ISW assessed on 26 December, based on recent footage from the area, that Russian forces had taken full control over Kurakhove's administrative boundaries and the fields south of the city on 25 December. The Kurakhove Power Station remained under Ukrainian control. The Ukrainian Khortytsia operational-strategic group acknowledged the loss of unspecified positions in the Kurakhove direction.

Following this, Russian forces began advancing into the industrial area near Kurakhove, reaching the eastern outskirts of the power plant around 28 December. According to Meduza, Ukrainian forces were pushed out of the industrial area by the end of December and withdrew to the village of Dachne.

A Ukrainian military observer stated on 3 January 2025 that the Kurakhove Power Station had come under Russian control following a Ukrainian withdrawal from the area.

On 6 January 2025, the Russian Ministry of Defence announced the capture of the city. On the same day, the Khortytsia group of forces claimed that battles in the "Kurakhove sector" were still ongoing.

DeepStateMap.Live showed the city as completely under Russian control on 10 January 2025.

== Strategic value ==
Kurakhove is an important economic center in the region, being fortified and located next to the Kurakhove reservoir. Control of the city is considered to be economically important, as major energy infrastructure facilities, like the Kurakhove Power Station and other businesses are located in and around the city. Kurakhove also has high military significance as it is located on a bottleneck, and the eastern limits of the defensive lines of Zaporizhia Oblast. This would possibly enable the Russian forces to outflank these defensive lines by capturing the city, and allow them to press directly onto Pokrovsk from the north, an effort that was deprioritized in order to capture Ukrainian cities south of it. The city was described as a crucial transport and logistics hub for Ukrainian forces in southern Donbas.

In November 2024 David Axe speculated that the fall of Kurakhove would lead to six Ukrainian brigades being forced into a salient.

== Casualties ==
=== Ukraine ===
The Russian Ministry of Defence claimed that Ukraine had stationed 15,000 soldiers in the city of Kurakhove itself, with 12,000 allegedly lost and 40 tanks destroyed. The Kremlin claimed that during two months of fighting near Kurakhove, Ukrainian forces suffered an average of 150 to 180 casualties per day.

== See also ==
- List of military engagements during the Russian invasion of Ukraine
- Battle of Avdiivka (2023–2024)
- Battle of Bakhmut
- Battle of Chasiv Yar
- Battle of Toretsk
- Velyka Novosilka offensive
- Pokrovsk offensive
