= 502nd Electronic Warfare Regiment =

- 502-й окремий батальйон радіоелектронної боротьби
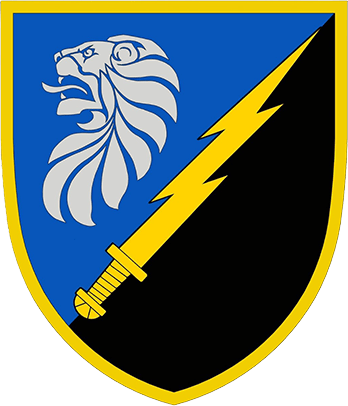
- Insignia
- Active: 1992-present
- Country: Ukraine
- Branch: Ukrainian Ground Forces
- Type: Regiment
- Role: Electronic Warfare
- Garrison/HQ: Cherkaske
- Engagements: Russo-Ukrainian War

Insignia
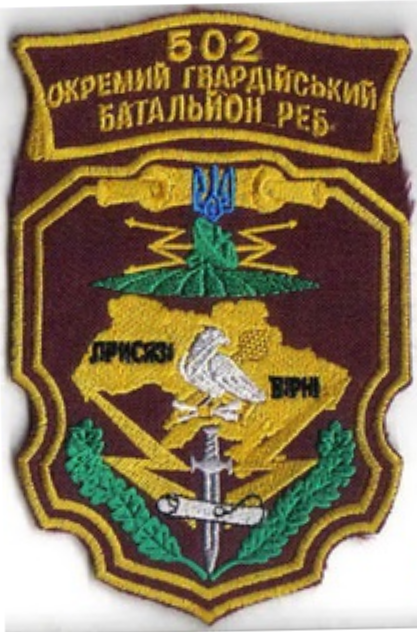
- Former Insignia

The 305th Electronic Warfare Regiment (MUN A1828) is a regiment level unit of the Armed Forces of Ukraine, concerned with electronic warfare. It is headquartered in Cherkaske and has seen action during both the War in Donbass and the Russian invasion of Ukraine.

== History ==
It was established as the 16th Separate Guards Reconnaissance Battalion, part of the 93rd Mechanized Brigade, which became the 502nd Separate Guards Reconnaissance and Electronic Warfare Battalion in 2003. The battalion was part of the 6th Army Corps, and later became part of the Operational Command East.

On 29 August 2014, a soldier of the battalion (Kudenchuk Ivan Mykolaovych) was killed in Novokaterynivka during the Battle of Ilovaisk. On 30 November 2015, a soldier of the battalion (Hura Yuri Serhiovych) was killed in Volnovakha after a mobile group of the battalion near the village of Novoselivka drove a GAZ-66 vehicle into a minefield and was blown up by an anti-tank mine.

On 15 March 2022, a soldier of the battalion (Chukharev Ivan Mykhailovych) went MIA near Novoselivka.

== Structure ==
Its structure is as follows:

- Management and Headquarters
- 1st EW Company
  - Navigation Platoon
  - Radio jamming Platoon
- 2nd EW Company
- 3rd EW Company
- Logistical Support Platoon
- Repair Platoon
- Medical Support center
