= List of cities with historical German exonyms =

The following is a list of cities and towns that have historically had official or local names in the German language. Commonly, these cities have at times been under the control of the Austro-Hungarian Empire or Germany or German nation-states. This is the main reason for German city exonyms. Some of these names remain in use today, particularly in regions where German is still spoken alongside other languages, or in border areas where the German names have retained relevance due to centuries of cross-border interaction and continued local usage. Other names are primarily historical, archaic, or rarely used in modern contexts, largely as a result of political changes following the end of German administration in these cities.

| City | Country | German name |
|---|---|---|
| Aabenraa | Denmark | Apenrade |
| Aalborg | Denmark | Aalburg |
| Aarhus | Denmark | Aarhaus, Arenhusen |
| Alba Iulia | Romania | Karlsburg, Weissenburg |
| Alytus | Lithuania | Alitten |
| Antwerp | Belgium | Antorff |
| Arlon | Belgium | Arel |
| Arnhem | Netherlands | Arnheim |
| Athens | Greece | Athen |
| Bacău | Romania | Bakau or Barchau |
| Bagrationovsk | Russia | Preußisch Eylau |
| Baltiysk | Russia | Pillau |
| Banja Luka | Bosnia and Herzegovina | Weina Luka |
| Banská Bystrica | Slovakia | Neusohl |
| Baranavichy | Belarus | Baronenwald |
| Békéscsaba | Hungary | Tschabe |
| Belfort | France | Beffert |
| Belgrade | Serbia | Belgrad |
| Bergamo | Italy | Wälsch-Bergen |
| Biała | Poland | Zülz |
| Bihać | Bosnia and Herzegovina | Wihitz |
| Bilhorod-Dnistrovskyi | Ukraine | Weißenburg |
| Bistrița | Romania | Bistritz |
| Bjelovar | Croatia | Bellowar |
| Bolzano | Italy | Bozen, Botzen |
| Brașov | Romania | Kronstadt |
| Bratislava | Slovakia | Pressburg |
| Brescia | Italy | Wälsch-Brixen |
| Brno | Czech Republic | Brünn |
| Bruges | Belgium | Brügge |
| Brussels | Belgium | Brüssel |
| Bucharest | Romania | Bukarest |
| Budapest | Hungary | Ofenpesth |
| Bydgoszcz | Poland | Bromberg |
| Bytom | Poland | Beuthen |
| Cairo | Egypt | Kairo |
| Calais | France | Kalen |
| Cape Town | South Africa | Kapstadt |
| Celje | Slovenia | Cilli |
| České Budějovice | Czech Republic | Budweis |
| Český Krumlov | Czech Republic | Krumau an der Moldau |
| České Velenice | Czech Republic | Gmünd-Bahnhof, (formerly: Unterwielands) |
| Charleroi | Belgium | Karolingen |
| Chełm | Poland | Kulm |
| Chernivtsi | Ukraine | Czernowitz |
| Chernyakhovsk | Russia | Insterburg |
| Chișinău | Moldova | Kischinau |
| Cieszyn | Poland | Teschen |
| Cluj-Napoca | Romania | Klausenburg |
| Colmar | France | Kolmar |
| Constanța | Romania | Konstanz, Küstendje |
| Copenhagen | Denmark | Kopenhagen |
| Daugavpils | Latvia | Dünaburg |
| Debrecen | Hungary | Debrezin |
| Den Bosch | Netherlands | Herzogenbusch |
| Douala | Cameroon | Duala |
| Dunkirk | France | Dünkirchen |
| Edinburgh | Scotland | Edinburg |
| Elbląg | Poland | Elbing |
| Ełk | Poland | Lyck |
| Fribourg | Switzerland | Freiburg |
| Gastellovo | Russia | Groß Friedrichsdorf |
| Viljandi | Estonia | Fellin |
| Gdańsk | Poland | Danzig |
| Gdynia | Poland | Gdingen, Gotenhafen |
| Geneva | Switzerland | Genf |
| Ghent | Belgium | Gent |
| Giurgiu | Romania | Zurz |
| Gliwice | Poland | Gleiwitz |
| Głogów | Poland | Glogau |
| Głogówek | Poland | Oberglogau |
| Goygol | Azerbaijan | Helenendorf |
| Grodno | Belarus | Garten |
| Grudziądz | Poland | Graudenz |
| Guryevsk | Russia | Neuhausen |
| Gusev | Russia | Gumbinnen |
| Gvardeysk | Russia | Tapiau |
| Győr | Hungary | Raab |
| Hradec Králové | Czech Republic | Königgrätz |
| Iași | Romania | Jassy |
| Ivano-Frankivsk | Ukraine | Stanislau |
| Ikšķile | Latvia | Üxkull |
| Jēkabpils | Latvia | Jakobstadt |
| Jelgava | Latvia | Mitau |
| Jonava | Lithuania | Janau |
| Kaliningrad | Russia | Königsberg |
| Kalisz | Poland | Kalisch |
| Karlovac | Croatia | Karlstadt |
| Karlovy Vary | Czech Republic | Karlsbad |
| Katowice | Poland | Kattowitz |
| Kaunas | Lithuania | Kauen |
| Kėdainiai | Lithuania | Kedahnen |
| Khust | Ukraine | Chust |
| Klaipėda | Lithuania | Memel |
| Komárno | Slovakia | Komorn |
| Körmend | Hungary | Kirment |
| Kokopo | Papua New Guinea | Herbertshöhe |
| Koper | Slovenia | Gafers |
| Košice | Slovakia | Kaschau |
| Kraków | Poland | Krakau |
| Krasnoznamensk | Russia | Lasdehnen, Haselberg |
| Kuressaare | Estonia | Arensburg |
| Ladushkin | Russia | Ludwigsort |
| Legnica | Poland | Liegnitz |
| Leuven | Belgium | Löwen |
| Łęczyca | Poland | Lentschütz |
| Liberec | Czech Republic | Reichenberg |
| Liège | Belgium | Lüttich |
| Liepāja | Latvia | Libau |
| Lille | France | Ryssel |
| Lisbon | Portugal | Lissabon |
| Ljubljana | Slovenia | Laibach |
| Łódź | Poland | Lodsch |
| Longwy | France | Langich |
| Lucerne | Switzerland | Luzern |
| Lugano | Switzerland | Lauis |
| Luxembourg | Luxembourg | Luxemburg |
| Lviv | Ukraine | Lemberg |
| Madang | Papua New Guinea | historicly: Friedrich-Wilhelmshafen |
| Mamonovo | Russia | Heiligenbeil |
| Maribor | Slovenia | Marburg |
| Marijampolė | Lithuania | Mariampol |
| Mažeikiai | Lithuania | Moscheiken |
| Mechelen | Belgium | Mecheln |
| Miercurea Ciuc | Romania | Szeklerburg |
| Milan | Italy | Mailand |
| Miskolc | Hungary | Mischkolz |
| Mons | Belgium | Bergen |
| Monza | Italy | Montsch |
| Mulhouse | France | Mülhausen |
| Namur | Belgium | Namen |
| Nancy | France | Nanzig |
| Naples | Italy | Neapel |
| Narva | Estonia | Narwa |
| Neman | Russia | Ragnit |
| Nesterov | Russia | Stallupönen, Ebenrode |
| Nice | France | Nizza |
| Nijmegen | Netherlands | Nimwegen |
| Nitra | Slovakia | Neutra |
| Novi Sad | Serbia | Neusatz |
| Nowy Sącz | Poland | Neu-Sandez |
| Ogre | Latvia | Oger |
| Olomouc | Czech Republic | Olmütz |
| Olsztyn | Poland | Allenstein |
| Opava | Czech Republic | Troppau |
| Opole | Poland | Oppeln |
| Oradea | Romania | Grosswardein |
| Osijek | Croatia | Esseg |
| Ostend | Belgium | Ostende |
| Ostrava | Czech Republic | Ostrau |
| Oświęcim | Poland | Auschwitz |
| Ozyorsk | Russia | Darkehmen |
| Paide | Estonia | Wittenstein |
| Panevėžys | Lithuania | Ponewiesch |
| Pärnu | Estonia | Pernau |
| Beijing | China | Peking |
| Pécs | Hungary | Fünfkirchen |
| Piła | Poland | Schneidermühl |
| Pionersky | Russia | Neukuhren |
| Ploiești | Romania | Plorescht |
| Plzeň | Czech Republic | Pilsen |
| Polessk | Russia | Labiau |
| Poznań | Poland | Posen |
| Prague | Czech Republic | Prag |
| Pravdinsk | Russia | Friedland |
| Prešov | Slovakia | Preschau, Eperies |
| Primorsk | Russia | Fischhausen |
| Prudnik | Poland | Neustadt in Oberschlesien |
| Przemyśl | Poland | Premissel |
| Pskov | Russia | Pleskau |
| Pula | Croatia | Pulei |
| Puławy | Poland | Pullno |
| Qingdao | China | Tsingtau |
| Rabaul | Papua New Guinea | Simpsonhafen |
| Rakvere | Estonia | Wesenberg |
| Racibórz | Poland | Ratibor |
| Rauna | Latvia | Rönneburg |
| Reșița | Romania | Reschitz |
| Rēzekne | Latvia | Rositten |
| Rijeka | Croatia | Pflaum |
| Roman | Romania | Romesmark, Romanvarasch |
| Rome | Italy | Rom |
| Šabac | Serbia | Schabatz, Sabatsch |
| Sandomierz | Poland | Sandomir |
| Sarajevo | Bosnia and Herzegovina | Sarajewo |
| Shamkir | Azerbaijan | Annenfeld |
| Šiauliai | Lithuania | Schaulen |
| Sibiu | Romania | Hermannstadt |
| Sieradz | Poland | Schieratz |
| Slavsk | Russia | Heinrichswalde |
| Słupsk | Poland | Stolp |
| Sopron | Hungary | Ödenburg |
| Sosnowiec | Poland | Sosnowitz |
| Sovetsk | Russia | Tilsit |
| Strasbourg | France | Straßburg |
| Subotica | Serbia | Maria-Theresiopel |
| Suceava | Romania | Sutschen, Suczawa |
| Syracuse | Italy | Syrakus |
| Svetlogorsk | Russia | Rauschen |
| Svetly | Russia | Zimmerbude |
| Szczecin | Poland | Stettin |
| Szeged | Hungary | Segedin |
| Székesfehérvár | Hungary | Stuhlweissenburg |
| Szolnok | Hungary | Sollnock, Zolnock |
| Szombathely | Hungary | Steinamanger |
| Tallinn | Estonia | Reval |
| Taranto | Italy | Tarent |
| Tarnów | Poland | Tarnau |
| Tartu | Estonia | Dorpat |
| Tauragė | Lithuania | Tauroggen |
| Telšiai | Lithuania | Telsche, Telschi |
| Timișoara | Romania | Temeswar |
| Toruń | Poland | Thorn |
| Tournai | Belgium | Dornick |
| Trakai | Lithuania | Traken |
| Trento | Italy | Trient |
| Třeboň | Czech Republic | Wittingau |
| Trieste | Italy | Triest |
| Trenčín | Slovakia | Trentschin, Trenczin |
| Trnava | Slovakia | Tyrnau |
| Turnu Severin | Romania | Turm Severin |
| Udine | Italy | Weiden |
| Ukmergė | Lithuania | Wilkomir |
| Utena | Lithuania | Utenen |
| Uzhhorod | Ukraine | Ungwar |
| Ústí nad Labem | Czech Republic | Aussig |
| Valmiera | Latvia | Wolmar |
| Venice | Italy | Venedig |
| Ventspils | Latvia | Windau |
| Verdun | France | Wirten |
| Verona | Italy | Bern |
| Vicenza | Italy | Wiesenthein |
| Vilnius | Lithuania | Wilna |
| Wałbrzych | Poland | Waldenburg |
| Warsaw | Poland | Warschau |
| Windhoek | Namibia | Windhuk |
| Wrocław | Poland | Breslau |
| Yantarny | Russia | Palmnicken |
| Yaoundé | Cameroon | Jaunde |
| Ypres | Belgium | Ypern |
| Zabrze | Poland | Hindenburg |
| Zagreb | Croatia | Agram |
| Zaragoza | Spain | Saragossa |
| Zelenogradsk | Russia | Cranz |
| Zheleznodorozhny | Russia | Gerdauen |
| Zielona Góra | Poland | Grünberg |
| Žilina | Slovakia | Sillein, Silein |
| Zlín | Czech Republic | Zlin |
| Znojmo | Czech Republic | Znaim |

== See also ==
German exonyms
