= Headquarters of the Supreme Commander-in-Chief =

Control body for the troops of the Armed Forces and law enforcement bodies of Ukraine

The Headquarters of the Supreme Commander-in-Chief (Ukrainian: Ставка Верховного Головнокомандувача ЗСУ, abbr. СВГ ЗСУ, romanized: Stavka Verkhovnoho Holovnokomanduvacha ZSU, SVH ZSU), or SCiC HQ, is the highest command and control body for the troops and individual branches of the Armed Forces of Ukraine, as well as law enforcement services and agencies of Ukraine, which are part of the Armed Forces, formed by decree of the President of Ukraine No. 72/2022 dated February 24, 2022 in response to the Russian invasion of Ukraine on that day.

== Structure and headquarters personnel ==
As of 12 December 2025:

№	Picture	Name	Office
Chair
		Volodymyr Zelenskyy	President, Supreme Commander-in-Chief of the Armed Forces of Ukraine
Headquarters Coordinator (ex officio)
		Rustem Umerov	Secretary of the National Security and Defense Council
Headquarters Members
1		Andrii Hnatov	Chief of the General Staff of the Armed Forces of Ukraine
2		Serhiy Boiev	First Deputy Minister for Defense
3		Kyrylo Budanov	Head of the Chief Directorate of Intelligence of the Ministry of Defence of Ukraine
4		Serhii Deineko	Chairman of the State Border Guard Service of Ukraine
5		Mykhailo Drapatyi	Commander of the Ukrainian Ground Forces
6		Andriy Yermak	Former Head of the Office of the President of Ukraine
7		Oleh Ivashchenko	Head of the Foreign Intelligence Service
8		Oleksandr Kamyshin	Advisor of the President of Ukraine, Strategies (non-paid)
9		Ihor Klymenko	Head of the National Police of Ukraine
10		Oleksiy Kuleba	Vice Prime Minister – Minister of Community and Territories Development
11		Vasyl Maliuk	Head of the Security Service of Ukraine
12		Oleksii Morozov	Director of the State Security Administration
13		Pavlo Palisa	Deputy Head of the Office of the President of Ukraine
14		Oleksandr Pivnenko	Commander of the National Guard of Ukraine
15		Oleksandr Potii	Head of the State Special Communications Service of Ukraine
16		Yulia Svyrydenko	Prime Minister of Ukraine
17		Andrii Sybiha	Minister of Foreign Affairs
18		Oleksandr Syrskyi	Commander-in-Chief of the Armed Forces of Ukraine
19		Ruslan Stefanchuk	Chairman of the Verkhovna Rada
20		Oleksandr Trepak	Commander of the Special Operations Forces
21		Mykhailo Fedorov	Deputy Prime Minister for Innovation, Education, Science and Technology Development and Minister of Digital Transformation
22		Hennadiy Shapovalov	Commander of the Ground Forces
23		Denys Shmyhal	Minister of Defense

== See also ==
- Supreme Commander-in-Chief of the Ukrainian Armed Forces
- Supreme Commander–in–Chief
- Commander-in-chief
