= Trudove, Kurakhove urban hromada, Pokrovsk Raion, Donetsk Oblast =

Trudove Трудове
- Village
- Interactive map of Trudove
- Location of Trudove within Ukraine Trudove (Donetsk Oblast)
- Coordinates: 47°53′54″N 37°13′03″E
- Country: Ukraine
- Oblast: Donetsk Oblast
- Raion: Pokrovsk Raion
- Hromada: Kurakhove urban hromada
- Elevation: 121 m (397 ft)

Population (2001 census)
  - Total: 116
- Time zone: UTC+2 (EET)
  - Summer (DST): UTC+3 (EEST)
- Postal code: 85650
- Area code: +380 6278
- KATOTTH: UA14160110240086395

Trudove (Ukrainian: Трудове; Russian: Трудовое) is a village in Kurakhove urban hromada, Pokrovsk Raion, Donetsk Oblast, eastern Ukraine. It is located 28.69 kilometres (17.83 mi) west-southwest (WSW) from the centre of Donetsk city.

== History ==
=== Russian invasion of Ukraine ===
Russian forces claimed to have captured the village by the beginning of November 2024, during the full-scale Russian invasion of Ukraine and renewed battles around Kurakhove.

On 18 December, DeepStateMap.Live reported that a pocket around Uspenivka and Trudove collapsed, after all supply ways to the salient were cut off and remaining troops failed to break out. Some Ukrainian soldiers were captured and the settlements were occupied.

The Ukrainian Khortytsia operational-strategic group of forces confirmed the withdrawal on 20 December, after "heavy defensive battles against a superior force". Further, the group denies that Ukrainian soldiers were left stranded, claiming that the withdrawal was completed to avoid encirclement.

== Demographics ==
In 2001 the settlement had 116 inhabitants, whose native languages were 95.69% Ukrainian and 4.31% Russian.
