= 76th Mechanized Brigade =

- 76-та окрема механізована бригада
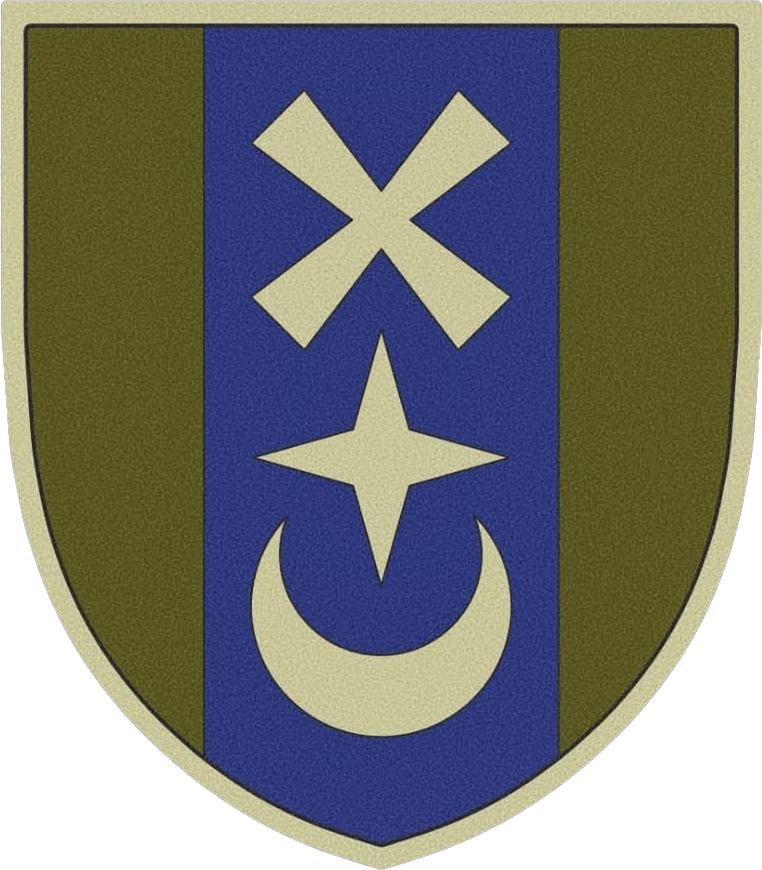
- Active: 3 July 2026 – present
- Country: Ukraine
- Allegiance: Armed Forces of Ukraine
- Branch: Ukrainian Ground Forces
- Type: Mechanized Infantry
- Size: Brigade
- Part of: Operational Command North
- Garrison/HQ: Kyiv, Kyiv Oblast
- Website: Official Facebook page

Commanders
- Current commander: ?

The 76th Mechanized Brigade, is a formation of the Ukrainian Ground Forces. Its the last of four mechanized brigades formed in 2026.

== History ==
The brigade was formally established around July 3rd and is in the final stages of formation. It is the last of four mechanized brigades of the Ukrainian Army to be established in 2026. The 50th Brigade was formed shortly before it, and prior to that, the 55th and 167th Brigades.

These are expected to be the last new formations, however, due to the change in leadership within the armed forces. In July 2026, Mykhailo Drapatyi replaced Oleksandr Syrskyi as Commander-in-Chief of the Armed Forces. Under his leadership, the new assault regiments, such as the 425th Assault Regiment, received many mobilized soldiers, while the traditional brigades received nothing. These brigades suffer from a lack of soldiers, discipline, and experience, as the history of the 155th Brigade demonstrates. And despite this, new mechanized brigades have continued to be formed in recent years. Even President Volodymyr Zelenskyy is said to have ordered his staff in January 2025 to halt the creation of new mechanized units and strengthen up existing ones. With Drapatyi's appointment as Commander-in-Chief, this change could finally occur, as he himself has often criticized Syrskyi's practices in the past.

== See also ==
- 72nd Mechanized Brigade
- 92nd Assault Brigade
- 93rd Mechanized Brigade
