= Vovchenko =

Vovchenko (Ukrainian: Вовченко) is a Ukrainian surname. Notable people with the surname include:

- Mykyta Vovchenko (born 1993), Ukrainian footballer
- Semen Vovchenko (born 1999), Ukrainian footballer

== See also ==
- Vovchenka, a Ukrainian settlement in the Pokrovsk district of Donetsk oblast
