= Novodmytrivka, Pokrovsk Raion =

Village in Donetsk Oblast, Ukraine

Novodmytrivka Новодмитрівка
- Village
- Interactive map of Novodmytrivka
- Novodmytrivka shown within Ukraine Novodmytrivka shown within Donetsk
- Coordinates: 48°5′19″N 37°13′31″E
- Country: Ukraine
- Oblast: Donetsk Oblast
- Raion: Pokrovsk Raion
- Hromada: Kurakhove urban hromada
- Elevation: 169 m (554 ft)

Population (2001)
  - Total: 199
- Postal code: 85374
- Area code: +380 623

Novodmytrivka (Ukrainian: Новодмитрівка; Russian: Новодмитровка) is a village in Kurakhove urban hromada of the Pokrovsk Raion in Donetsk Oblast, Ukraine.

== Description ==
The village lands border the territory of the village of Voznesenka, Donetsk Oblast.

On November 6, 2024, Russian troops captured the village.

== Demographics ==
According to 2001 Ukrainian census, the village had a population of 199 people, with 85.93% indicating Ukrainian as their native language, 14.07% indicating Russian.
