= Yantarny =

Yantarny may also refer to Yantarni Volcano.

Yantarny (Russian: Янта́рный; masculine), Yantarnoye (Russian: Янта́рное; neuter), or Yantarne (Ukrainian: Янта́рне; neuter), 'Amber', is the name of several inhabited localities in Russia and some settlements in Ukraine.

== Russia ==
=== Urban localities ===
- Yantarny, Kaliningrad Oblast, an urban-type settlement in the Kaliningrad Oblast

=== Rural localities ===
- Yantarny, Krasnodar Krai, a settlement in the Michurinsky Rural Okrug of the Dinskoy District, Krasnodar Krai; 45°08′N 39°15′E
- Yantarny, Rostov Oblast, a settlement in the Bolshelogskoye Rural Settlement of the Aksaysky District, Rostov Oblast; 47°18′N 39°50′E
- Yantarny, Saratov Oblast, a settlement in the Pugachyovsky District of the Saratov Oblast
- Yantarnoye, Kabardino-Balkaria, a selo in the Prokhladnensky District of the Kabardino-Balkarian Republic; 43°46′N 43°54′E
- Yantarnoye, Orenburg Oblast, a selo in Baklanovsky Selsoviet of the Sorochinsky District, Orenburg Oblast

== Ukraine ==
- Yantarne, Crimea, a place in the Kurman Raion of the Autonomous Republic of Crimea, or Yantarnoye, a selo in the Krasnogvardeysky District of the Republic of Crimea
- Yantarne, Donetsk Oblast, a village in the Kurakhove urban hromada of the Pokrovsk Raion, Donetsk Oblast, or Yantarnoye, Donetsk People's Republic, a place in the Pokrovsky District of the Donetsk People's Republic; 47°56′37″N 37°09′55″E
- Novoiavorivsk, a city the Yavoriv Raion of the Lviv Oblast which was formerly known as Yantarne; 49°55′52″N 23°34′23″E
