= Novoselivka =

Novoselivka (Ukrainian: Новоселівка) may refer to several places in Ukraine:

== Cherkasy Oblast ==
- Novoselivka, Cherkasy Raion, village in Cherkasy Raion

== Chernihiv Oblast ==
- Novoselivka, Chernihiv Raion, village in Chernihiv Raion
- Novoselivka, Talalaivka Raion, village in Talalaivka Raion
- Novoselivka, Novhorod-Siverskyi Raion, village in Novhorod-Siverskyi Raion
- Novoselivka, Korukivka Raion, village in Korukivka Raion

== Donetsk Oblast ==
- Novoselivka, Kramatorsk Raion, village in Kramatorsk Raion
- Novoselivka, Pokrovsk Raion, village in Pokrovsk Raion
- Novoselivka, Bakhmut Raion, Donetsk Oblast, village in Bakhmut Raion
- Novoselydivka, village in Kurakhove urban hromada, Pokrovsk Raion

== Odesa Oblast ==
- Novoselivka, Artsyz Raion, village in Artsyz Raion
- Novoselivka, Beresivka Raion, village in Beresivka Raion
- Novoselivka, Izmail Raion, village in Izmail Raion
- Novoselivka, Liubashivka Raion, village in Liubashivka Raion
- Novoselivka, Podilsk Raion, village in Podilsk Raion
- Novoselivka, Rozdilna Raion, village in Rozdilna Raion
- Novoselivka, Sarata Raion, village in Sarata Raion
- Novoselivka, Tarutyne Raion, village in Tarutyne Raion
- Novoselivka (Velyka Mykhailivka), Velyka Mykhailivka Raion, village in Velyka Mykhailivka village council, Velyka Mykhailivka Raion
- Novoselivka (Vyshneve), Velyka Mykhailivka Raion, village in Vyshneve village council, Velyka Mykhailivka Raion

== Poltava Oblast ==
- Novoselivka, Hadiach Raion
- Novoselivka, Hlobyne Raion
- Novoselivka, Hrebinka Raion
- Novoselivka, Kozelshchyna Raion
- Novoselivka, Kremenchuk Raion
- Novoselivka, Orzhytsia Raion
- Novoselivka, Poltava Raion
- Novoselivka, Zinkiv Raion

== Rivne Oblast ==
- Novoselivka, Rivne Oblast, village in Mlyniv Raion

== Sumy Oblast ==
- Novoselivka, Konotop Raion, village in Konotop Raion
- Novoselivka, Lebedyn Raion, village in Lebedyn Raion
- Novoselivka, Trostianets Raion, village in Trostianets Raion

== Zaporizhzhia Oblast ==
- Novoselivka, Orikhiv Raion, village in Orikhiv Raion
- Novoselivka, Polohy Raion, village in Polohy Raion
- Novoselivka, Vilniansk Raion, village in Vilniansk Raion
