= Bohdan Krotevych =

Ukrainian serviceman (born 1993)

- Богдан Кротевич
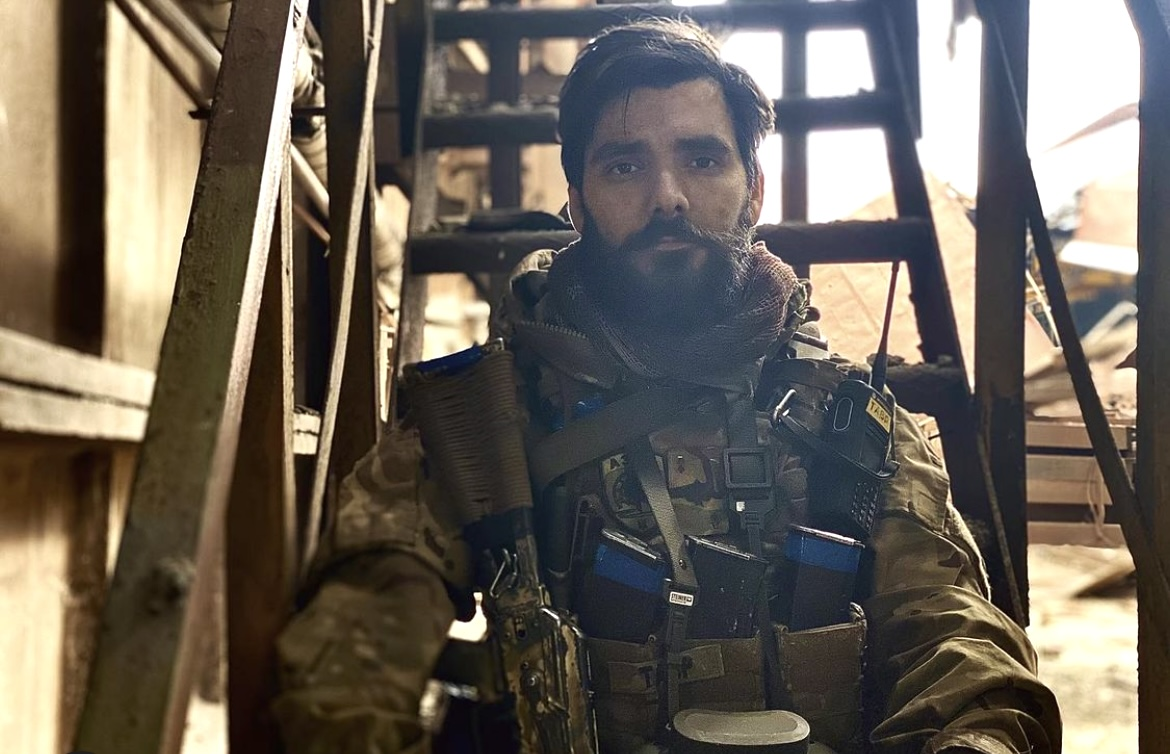

Personal details
- Born: Bohdan Oleksandrovych Krotevych; 26 March 1993 (age 33) Izmail, Odesa Oblast, Ukraine
- Education: Kyiv National University of Water Transport
- Nickname: Тавр (Tavr)

Military service
- Allegiance: Ukraine
- Branch/service: National Guard of Ukraine
- Rank: Lieutenant colonel
- Battles/wars: Russo-Ukrainian War
- Awards: Order of Bohdan Khmelnytsky

Bohdan Oleksandrovych Krotevych (Ukrainian: Богдан Олександрович Кротевич; born 26 March 1993, Izmail, Odesa Oblast) is a Ukrainian serviceman fighting in the Russo-Ukrainian war. He is a lieutenant colonel in the National Guard of Ukraine, and acting commander of the National Guard of Ukraine unit Azov Brigade.

== Biography ==
He studied at the Simferopol School of Arts. He graduated from the Faculty of Navigation of the Kyiv National University of Water Transport.

He participated in the Revolution of Dignity as a member of the Right Sector.

Since 2014, he has fought in the Russo-Ukrainian war as part of the Azov Regiment, where he served as a platoon commander; he later became deputy chief of staff, and after 2021, became chief of staff and first deputy commander. He took part in the battles for Shyrokyne and the defense of the Svitlodarsk bulge, Marinka, and Krasnohorivka.

=== 2022 Russian invasion of Ukraine ===
As the Chief of Staff of the Azov Regiment, on 28 March 2022, in a video message, he called for the creation of a humanitarian corridor in Mariupol to save civilians.

On 1 April 2022, he gave an interview to the Belsat channel from the besieged Azovstal, where he spoke about the humanitarian catastrophe in the city of Mariupol.

On 21 September 2022, he was released from Russian captivity.

As of 2023, he is the acting commander of the Azov Brigade.

In 2024, he reported General Yurii Sodol to the State Bureau of Investigation for improper command.

== Awards ==
- Order of Bohdan Khmelnytsky, III class (25 March 2022)
