= Oleksandr Pivnenko =

Ukrainian military commander (born 1986)

Hero of Ukraine Oleksandr Pivnenko
- Олександр Півненко
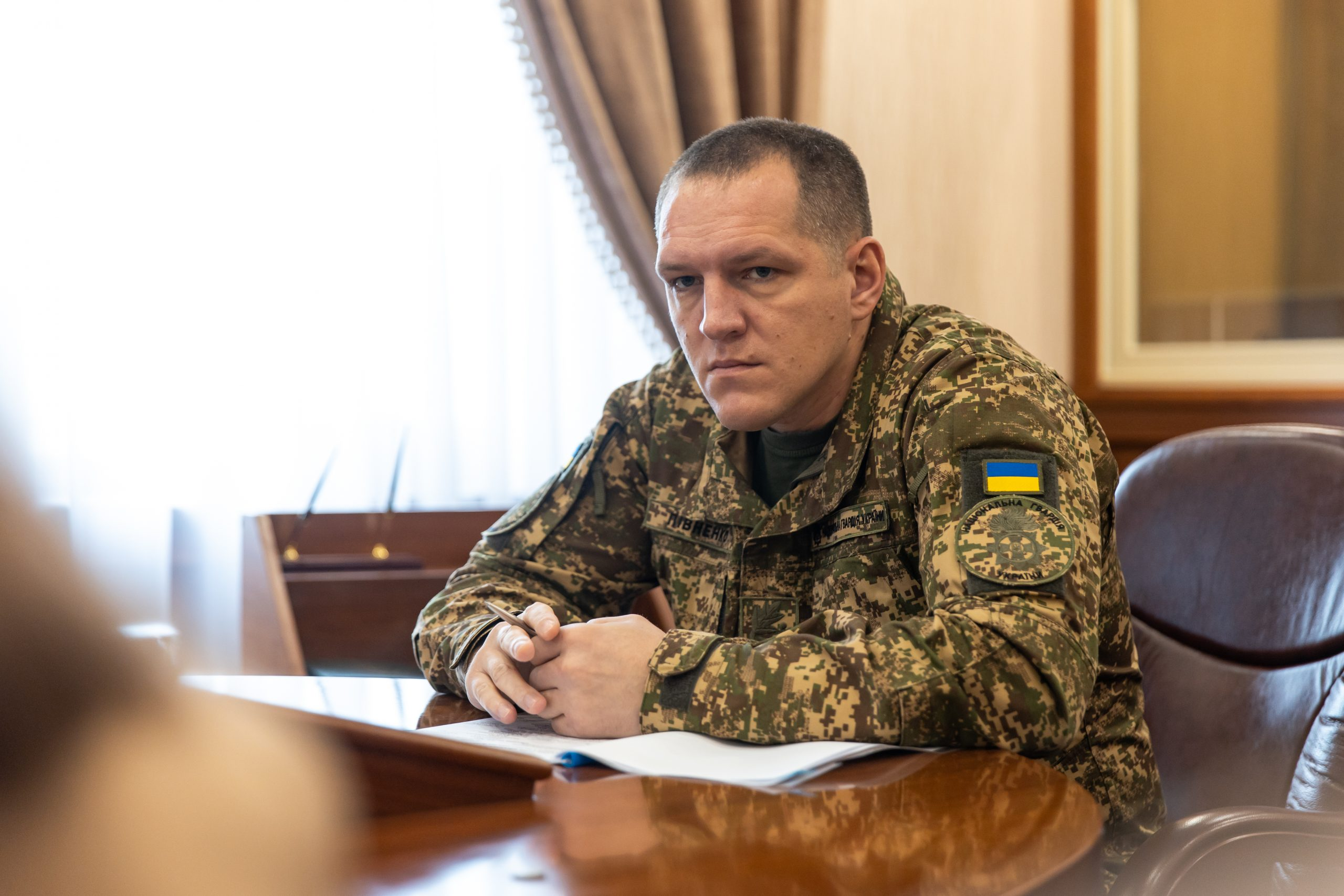
- Pivnenko in 2023

Commander of the National Guard of Ukraine
- Incumbent
- Assumed office 8 July 2023
- Preceded by: Yuriy Lebid

Personal details
- Born: 1986 (age 39–40) East Germany
- Citizenship: Ukraine
- Education: Military Institute of Tank Troops of NTU "KhPI", National Defense University of Ukraine
- Website: www.ngu.gov.ua

Military service
- Branch/service: Internal Troops of Ukraine (2008–2014); National Guard of Ukraine (2014–present)
- Years of service: 2008–present
- Rank: Major general
- Commands: National Guard Commander; National Defense University of Ukraine (until 2023)
- Battles/wars: Russo-Ukrainian War
- Awards: Hero of Ukraine; Order For Courage, 2nd class; Order For Courage, 3rd class

Oleksandr Serhiiovych Pivnenko (Ukrainian: Олександр Сергійович Півненко; born 1986) is a Ukrainian athlete, serviceman, and the commander of the National Guard of Ukraine (NGU). He is also a member of the Headquarters of the Supreme Commander-in-Chief since July 25, 2023. He currently holds the rank of Major general, and is also awarded with the title Hero of Ukraine.

== Biography ==
Oleksandr Pivnenko was born in 1986 in East Germany to a military family.

Pivnenko graduated from the Kryvyi Rih Lyceum with enhanced physical training, the Kharkiv Institute of Tank Troops, and the National Defense University of Ukraine (operational and tactical level). He served in the Omega Special Forces Detachment of the National Guard of Ukraine in Kyiv. As of 2011, he was an officer of the Special Forces and Counterterrorism Unit of the 1st Presidential Operational Brigade.

=== Russo-Ukrainian War ===
On 2018, Pivnenko joined the Eastern Territorial Directorate of the NGU, and actively took part in the War in Donbas.

During the initial stages of the full-scale Russian invasion of Ukraine, Pivnenko participated in the battle of Kharkiv including the liberation of Kutuzivka, Mala Rohan and Tsyrkuny from Russian occupation. He also participated in fighting around the Toretsk direction in Donetsk Oblast. In July 2022, he was appointed commander of the 3rd Operational Brigade.

In 2023, he was appointed head of the Eastern Territorial Directorate of the NGU.

On July 8, 2023, Pivnenko was appointed Commander of the National Guard of Ukraine by Ukrainian president Volodymyr Zelenskyy. On July 10, he was introduced by Ihor Klymenko, Minister of Internal Affairs of Ukraine, to the National Guard's command staff. On July 25, he was admitted into the Headquarters of the Supreme Commander-in-Chief. On November 29, he was assigned the rank Brigadier general by President Zelenskyy.

== Personal life ==
He is fond of sports.

== Awards ==
- The title of Hero of Ukraine with the "Order of the Gold Star" (23 March 2023)
- Order for Courage, 2nd class (30 April 2022)
- Order for Courage, 3rd class (17 June 2016)
