= Serhii Naiev =

Ukrainian lieutenant general (born 1970)

- Сергій Наєв
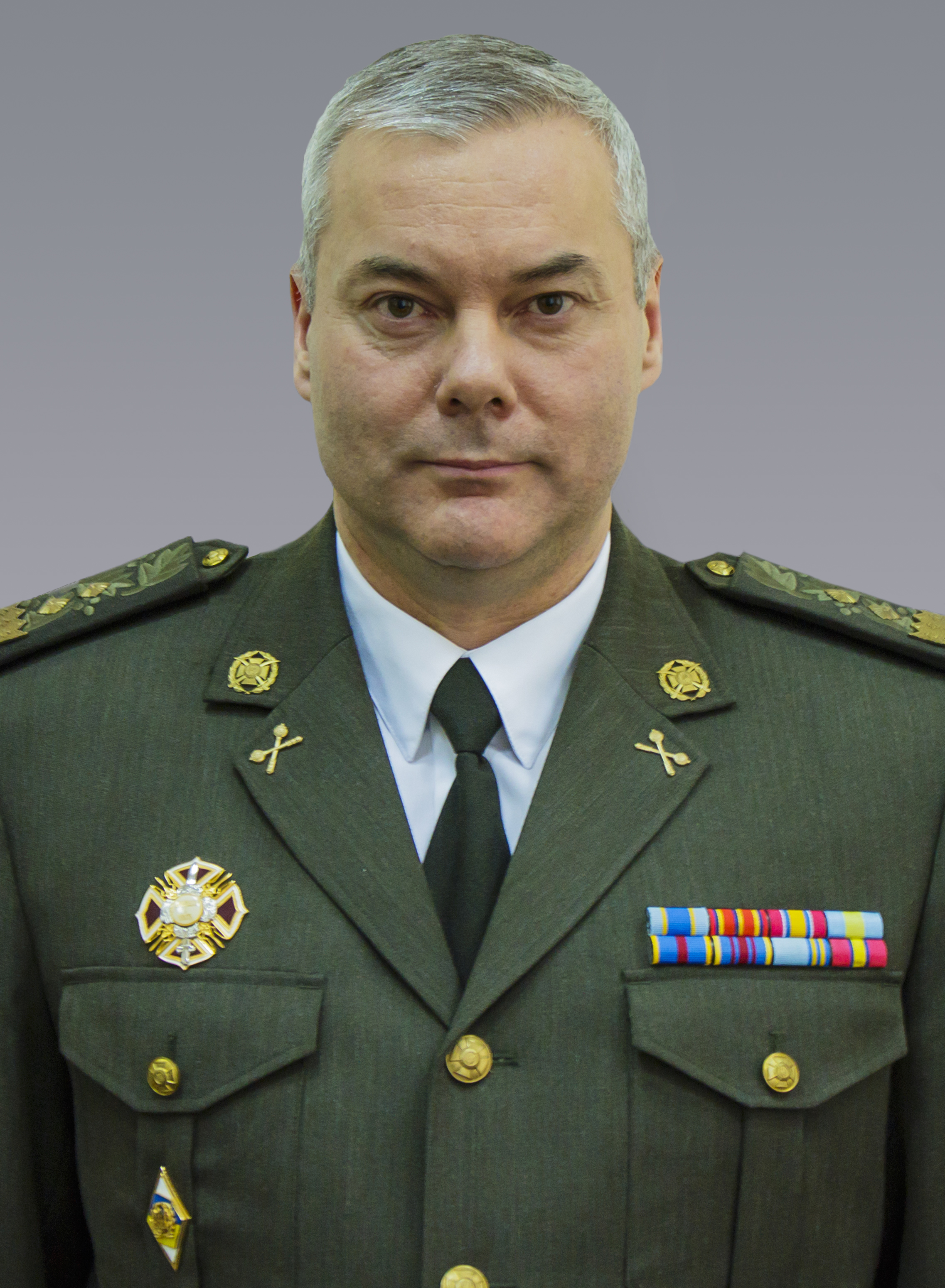

Commander of the Joint Forces of the Armed Forces of Ukraine
- In office 27 March 2020 – 11 February 2024
- President: Volodymyr Zelenskyy
- Preceded by: Yurii Sodol

Personal details
- Born: 30 April 1970 (age 55) Mohyliv-Podilskyi, Ukrainian SSR, Soviet Union (now Ukraine)
- Education: Moscow Higher Military Command School

Military service
- Allegiance: Ukraine
- Branch/service: Ukrainian Ground Forces
- Years of service: 1991–present
- Rank: Lieutenant general
- Battles/wars: Russo-Ukrainian War; First Battle of Donetsk Airport
- Awards: Hero of Ukraine; Order of Bohdan Khmelnytsky; Medal For Military Service to Ukraine; Defender of the Motherland Medal

Serhii Ivanovych Naiev (Ukrainian: Сергій Іванович Наєв; born 30 April 1970) is a Ukrainian lieutenant general who served as Commander of the Joint Forces of the Armed Forces of Ukraine from 2016 until 2024.

== Biography ==
Naiev was born on 30 April 1970, in Mohyliv-Podilskyi, Vinnytsia Oblast, and pursued his education from 1987 to 1991 at the Moscow Higher Military Command School, attaining the rank of lieutenant upon completion. Between 1991 and 1993, he served as the commander of a motorized infantry platoon within a unit of the Group of Soviet Forces in Germany.

In 2014, Naiev played a pivotal role as the head of Sector B during the intense battles for Donetsk airport. Following his service, he assumed the role of the commander of Operational Command East from 2015 to 2017, having previously served as the chief executive officer at Operational Command South.

In March 2018, Viktor Muzhenko, the head of the General Staff of the Ukrainian Armed Forces, appointed Naiev as his deputy. From 16 March 2018 to 6 May 2019, Naiev held the position of commander of the Joint Forces of the Armed Forces of Ukraine. Subsequently, on 27 March 2020, he was reinstated in this role. He was again removed from this position on 11 February 2024.

Under his direct supervision, five strategic operations of the Ukrainian Armed Forces in the war against Russia were carried out: 1) The rapid deployment of troops before the invasion; 2) Ensuring the army's readiness during the invasion; 3) Maintaining control over the Black Sea; 4) Preserving the most combat-ready units; 5) Preparing for the liberation of the Kharkiv Oblast. Additionally, at Nayev's initiative, mobile air defense units were established.

In February 2025, Naiev was interviewed by Ukrainska Pravda, and spoke frankly about the failure of the Ukrainian government to adequately prepare for the war, and stated that Volodymyr Zelenskyy bore responsibility for these mistakes. Immediately following its publication, Naiev was appointed as commander of the Velyka Novosilka tactical group. Ukrainian military journalist Yuri Butusov claimed that Zelenskyy personally ordered Naiev to the front, and that his appointment went against army regulations since Naiev was not an actively serving commander at the time.

== Awards ==
- On 28 April 2022, he was made a Hero of Ukraine by President Volodymyr Zelenskyy.
- Order of Bohdan Khmelnytsky (3 May 2019)
