= Joint Forces Command of the Armed Forces of Ukraine =

- Ukrainian: Командування об'єднаних сил Збройних Сил України
- Emblem of the Joint Forces Command
- Active: 5 February 2020–present
- Country: Ukraine
- Type: Command
- Part of: Ukrainian Ground Forces
- Headquarters: Povitrianykh Syl Avenue 6, Kyiv

Commanders
- Commander: Major General Mykhailo Drapatyi

Insignia
- Shoulder sleeve insignia

The Joint Forces Command of the Armed Forces of Ukraine (Ukrainian: Командування об'єднаних сил Збройних Сил України, romanized: Komanduvannia obiednanykh syl Zbroinykh Syl Ukrainy) is a body of the General Staff of the Armed Forces of Ukraine. It was created in 2020 with the goal of planning and coordinating combined military operations in Ukraine.

== History ==
The creation of the Joint Forces Command was provided for on 10 December 2019 by decree No. 624 of the Ministry of Defense of Ukraine, with the aim of improving the management of the Armed Forces of Ukraine by creating a centralized body for planning and employment of military units belonging to all branches of the armed forces. The command was established on 5 February 2020, and on 27 March Lieutenant General Serhii Naiev was appointed the first Commander of the Joint Forces of the Armed Forces of Ukraine. Between 22 and 25 September 2020, the Joint Forces Command conducted the strategic and organizational exercises "Joint-Efforts 2020" (Об'єднані зусилля–2020), involving approximately 12,000 personnel and 700 combat vehicles from over 100 military units, as well as about 200 instructors, military advisers and foreign observers from NATO countries.

== List of commanders ==
No.	Portrait	Name	Took office	Left office	Time in office	Defence branch	Ref.
1	Serhii Naiev	Lieutenant General; Serhii Naiev (born 1970)	27 March 2020	11 February 2024	3 years, 321 days	Ukrainian Ground Forces	
2	Yurii Sodol	Lieutenant General; Yurii Sodol (born 1970)	11 February 2024	24 June 2024	134 days	Ukrainian Marine Corps	
3	Andrii Hnatov	Major General; Andrii Hnatov	24 June 2024	26 February 2025	247 days	Ukrainian Marine Corps	
3	Mykhailo Drapatyi	Major General; Mykhailo Drapatyi (born 1982)	3 June 2025	21 July 2026	1 year, 48 days	Ukrainian Ground Forces	

== See also ==
- Structure of the Armed Forces of Ukraine
