= Andrii Hnatov =

Ukrainian military officer

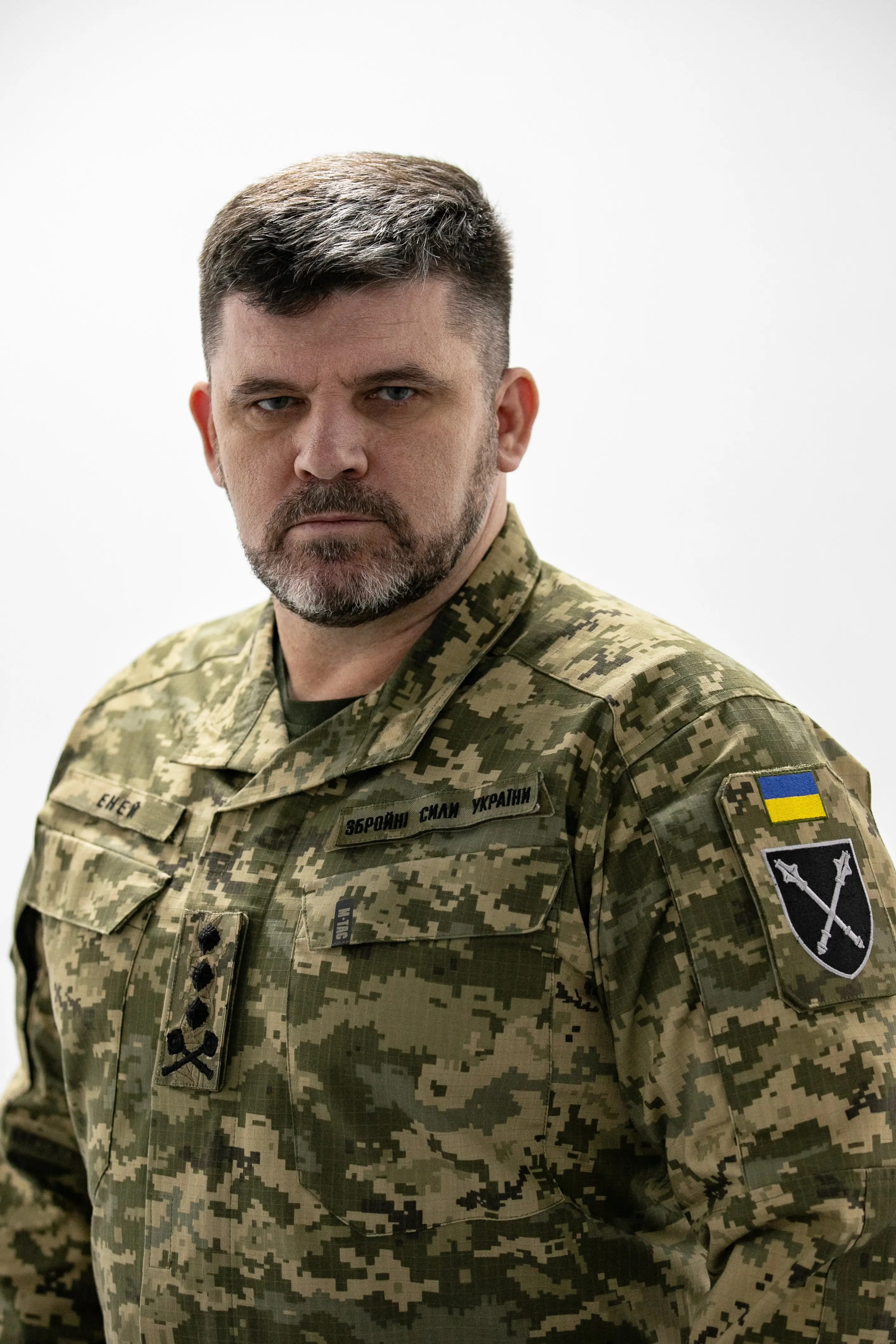
- Hnatov as Chief of the General Staff, 2026
- Native name: Андрій Гнатов
- Allegiance: Ukraine
- Branch: Ukrainian Marine Corps
- Service years: 2001–present
- Rank: Lieutenant General
- Commands: Chief of the General Staff; Joint Forces Command of the Armed Forces of Ukraine; 36th Marine Brigade
- Conflicts: Russo-Ukrainian war
- Awards: Order of Bohdan Khmelnytsky; Cross of Military Merit; Medal For Military Service to Ukraine
- Education: Military Institute of Tank Troops

Lieutenant General Andrii Viktorovych Hnatov (Ukrainian: Андрій Вікторович Гнатов) is a Ukrainian Marine Corps officer who was the Chief of the General Staff of the Armed Forces of Ukraine from 2025 to 2026. He was previously the Commander of the Joint Forces of the Armed Forces of Ukraine from 2024 to 2025. Member of the Headquarters of the Supreme Commander-in-Chief since 28 March 2025.

== Biography ==
He was among the several hundred Ukrainian naval infantry personnel in Crimea that remained loyal to Ukraine and left the peninsula after the annexation of Crimea by the Russian Federation in 2014. In 2018, he worked to move Ukraine's armed forces away from the Soviet model, both for uniforms and symbols and for combat doctrines.

Hnatov was the Commander of the Joint Forces of the Ukrainian Armed Forces (KOS of the Armed Forces of Ukraine, military unit A0135), commanding troops of the Eastern Operational Command. He was previously the Deputy Commander of the Southern Operational Command.

On August 23, 2024, he was promoted to the rank of major general.

On January 27, 2025, President Zelenskyy announced Hnatov would be replaced by Major General Mykhailo Drapatyi as the commander of the Khortytsia operational-strategic group. General Drapatyi will remain also Commander of the Ukrainian Ground Forces.

On February 26, 2025, he was dismissed from the Commander of the Joint Forces of the Ukrainian Armed Forces. He was appointed as the new Deputy Chief of General Staff of the Ukrainian Armed Forces on February 27, 2025.

On March 16, 2025, he was appointed as Chief of General Staff of the Ukrainian Armed Forces. On March 28 appointed a staffer of the Headquarters of the Supreme Commander-in-Chief.

On 22 July 2026, Hnatov was dismissed as Chief of the General Staff and replaced by Major General Ihor Skybiuk, following a reshuffle of Ukraine's military leadership.

Military offices
Preceded by Dmytro Delyatytskyi	Commander of the 36th Marine Brigade; 2018–2021	Succeeded by Volodymyr Baraniuk
Preceded by Yurii Sodol	Commander of the Joint Forces of the Armed Forces of Ukraine; 2024–2025	Succeeded by Mykhailo Drapatyi
Preceded by Anatoliy Barhylevych	Chief of the General Staff of the Armed Forces of Ukraine; 2025–2026	Succeeded by Ihor Skybiuk
