= Maryana Bezuhla =

Ukrainian politician

- Мар'яна Безугла
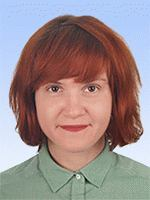
- Official portrait, 2019

People's Deputy of Ukraine
- Incumbent
- Assumed office 29 August 2019
- Preceded by: Andriy Biletsky
- Constituency: Kyiv, No. 217

Personal details
- Born: 17 May 1988 (age 37) Kiev, Ukrainian SSR, Soviet Union (now Ukraine)
- Party: Independent (since 2024)
- Other political affiliations: Servant of the People (2019–2024)

Maryana Volodymyrivna Bezuhla (Ukrainian: Мар'яна Володимирівна Безугла; born 17 May 1988), is a Ukrainian politician who is currently a People's Deputy of Ukraine, representing Ukraine's 217th electoral district. She is also a member of the Permanent Delegation to the NATO Parliamentary Assembly.

Elected in 2019 for the party Servant of the People, she left the party and its parliamentary faction in 2024. She did so while accusing her former party colleagues of "sabotaging" the "national security and defense sector".

Bezuhla worked in a clinic and was at the frontline. She worked in the Project Office of Reforms of the Ministry of Defense, reformed the medical supply system of the Ukrainian Armed Forces as head of the program "Reform of the Armed Forces medical supply system" in the Ministry of Defense. As of 2019, she was a senior inspector for control over the orders execution of the Center for Performance Activities Support department of civilian experts in the Ukrainian Ministry of Defense and the Ukrainian Armed Forces General Staff.

== Early life and education ==
Maryana Bezuhla was born in Kyiv on 17 May 1988.

Bezuhla graduated from the First Medical Faculty of the Bogomolets National Medical University with a degree in General Medicine and the Ukrainian Military Medical Academy in the direction of General Practice – Family Medicine. She completed an internship at the US Department of State, where, following the course, she received a specialization in organization and management of healthcare.

== Political career ==
=== Servant of the People party ===
On 10 November 2019, she joined the Servant of the People party.

Bezuhla was elected a People's Deputy from the Servant of the People party in the 2019 parliamentary elections (constituency No. 217, part of the Obolonskyi District of Kyiv). Bezuhla is the Chairperson of the Subcommittee on the Implementation of NATO Values and Standards, International Military Cooperation and Peacekeeping. She is also a member of the Permanent Delegation to the NATO Parliamentary Assembly. At the time of the election she was a Senior Inspector for Monitoring the Implementation of the Assignments of the Department of Civilian Experts of the Service Support Center of the Ministry of Defense of Ukraine and a General Staff of the Armed Forces of Ukraine as an independent.

On 12 December 2019, Bezuhla became a member of the Humanitarian Country Inter-Factional Association, created at the initiative of UAnimals to promote humanistic values and protect animals from cruelty.

On 7 December 2020, Bezuhla was included in the list of Ukrainian individuals against whom sanctions were imposed by the Russian government.

Bezuhla is also the chairman of the Temporary Commission of Inquiry of the Verkhovna Rada to investigate possible illegal actions of government officials and others who could contribute to the violation of state sovereignty, territorial integrity and inviolability of Ukraine and pose a threat to national security of Ukraine, since 19 May 2021.

=== Russian invasion of Ukraine ===
From April 2022, Bezuhla served in the Ukrainian-Russian war zone to "try to help, organize communication between the military and civilians."

On 5 May 2022, Bezuhla submitted a draft law to the Verkhovna Rada (Ukraine's national parliament) which could allow commanders to kill military personnel in a combat situation if they refused to follow orders. At the time of the submission, during martial law and in a combat situation, commanders had the right to use weapons against violators of the charter "without leading to the death of a serviceman". This draft law would have removed this line. The draft law proved highly controversial, and as such was withdrawn on 24 May 2022.

During the war, Bezuhla consistently criticized the military commanders with whom president Volodymyr Zelenskyy had issues, in public as well as on social media. Starting in November 2023, she criticized the Commander-in-Chief of the Armed Forces of Ukraine Valerii Zaluzhnyi, until in February 2024 he was dismissed from the Army. In 2024, she switched to criticising Commander of the Joint Forces of the Armed Forces of Ukraine Yurii Sodol, whom she called a "criminal", a "butcher", and a "murderer" on a daily basis. Sodol was dismissed in June 2024.

On 11 January 2024, Bezuhla claimed on Facebook that she had "written a statement about leaving the Servant of the People faction and party." She claimed that she would continue "to support the President's initiatives" and stated she did "not want to have a common commitment" with fellow party members who "stick a knife in the back." In April 2024 she claimed to have changed her mind about leaving the faction to "not substitute the president".

On 15 July 2024, Bezuhla was removed from the position of Chairman of the Subcommittee on Democratic Civil Oversight and Control in the parliamentary Committee on National Security. She claimed that the committee's decision was related to her public statements about the problems in the Armed Forces.

On 17 July 2024 it became clear that Bezuhla had left the Servant of the People parliamentary faction. According to her post on Facebook she "no longer [had] the moral strength to associate myself with the faction even formally." She accused the fellow party members in her parliamentary committee of "[uniting] with the opposition in matters of sabotage, not the fulfillment of its mission of legislation and control over the national security and defense sector." (According to her) "They work together with the ES, Holos and Batkivshchyna factions in this regard."

The 12th Army Corps was initially disclosed by Mariana Bezuhla in November 2024, although it gained more widespread attention later.

== Controversies ==
According to media reports, on the eve of the election, agitators donated free T-shirts and caps in exchange for a subscription to the Facebook community of Bezuhla. Later at a press conference she rejected the accusations, explaining that according to Ukrainian law, the campaign materials distributed could not be considered vote buying, because the set costed less than 125 hryvnias.

=== During the Russian invasion of Ukraine ===
Bezuhla is the author of the draft law No. 7351, which gives the military command the right to kill military personnel for non-compliance even without any proven circumstances. It was evaluated as an attempt to restore the death penalty in Ukraine.

On 16 July 2024 Maryana Bezuhla was added to the Myrotvorets database for discrediting the Ukrainian government, the Armed Forces and "actions aimed at demoralizing the army".

During the 26 August 2024 Russian strikes on Ukraine Bezuhla published unconfirmed information that an F-16 fighter jet of the Armed Forces was shot down by friendly fire, which was denied by the Air Force Command. On 18 September, the Verkhovna Rada unanimously voted to remove her from her position as deputy chair of the Parliamentary Committee on National Security and Defense.
