= Serhiy Matyukhin =

Ukrainian footballer and coach

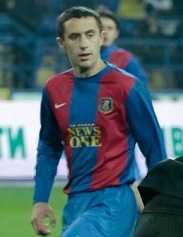

Personal information
- Date of birth: 21 March 1980 (age 46)
- Place of birth: Dachne, Donetsk Oblast, Soviet Union
- Height: 1.86 m (6 ft 1 in)
- Position: Defender

Senior career*
Years	Team	Apps	(Gls)
1997–2010	Dnipro Dnipropetrovsk	117	(8)
1997–2004	→ Dnipro-2 Dnipropetrovsk	48	(2)
2000–2001	→ Dnipro-3 Dnipropetrovsk	6	(1)
2002	→ Kryvbas Kryvyi Rih (loan)	12	(0)
2008	→ Kryvbas Kryvyi Rih (loan)	10	(0)
2009	→ Arsenal Kyiv (loan)	12	(1)
2009–2011	Arsenal Kyiv	33	(1)
2011	Oleksandriya	1	(0)
Total		239	(13)

International career
2004–2005	Ukraine	3	(0)

Managerial career
- 2015–2017: Chornomorets Odesa (U21 assistant)
- * Club domestic league appearances and goals

Serhiy Matyukhin (Ukrainian: Сергій Матюхін; born 21 March 1980) is a Ukrainian retired professional footballer and coach.

== Career ==
Most of his career, Matyukhin spent in FC Dnipro Dnipropetrovsk from 1997 to 2010. In his early career, he played for FC Dnipro-2 Dnipropetrovsk which is the second team and it used to take part in the professional competitions during that time. In 2009 Matyukhin was loaned to FC Arsenal Kyiv and completed the permanent move in the following league campaign.
