= Izmailivka, Pokrovsk Raion, Donetsk Oblast =

Izmailivka Ізмайлівка
- Village
- Interactive map of Izmailivka
- Location of Izmailivka within Ukraine Izmailivka (Donetsk Oblast)
- Coordinates: 48°03′27″N 37°20′45″E
- Country: Ukraine
- Oblast: Donetsk Oblast
- Raion: Pokrovsk Raion
- Hromada: Kurakhove urban hromada
- Elevation: 181 m (594 ft)

Population (2001 census)
  - Total: 199
- Time zone: UTC+2 (EET)
  - Summer (DST): UTC+3 (EEST)
- Postal code: 85610
- Area code: +380 6278

Izmailivka (Ukrainian: Ізмайлівка; Russian: Измайловка) is a village in Kurakhove urban hromada, Pokrovsk Raion, Donetsk Oblast, eastern Ukraine. It is located 34.21 kilometres (21.26 mi) west by north (WbN) from the centre of Donetsk city.

== History ==
On 23 October 2024, the village was captured by Russian forces as part of the Pokrovsk offensive.

== Demographics ==
As of the 2001 Ukrainian census, the settlement had 199 inhabitants, whose native languages were 28.64% Ukrainian and 71.36% Russian.
