= Sontsivka =

Village in Donetsk Oblast, Ukraine

Sontsivka Сонцівка
- Village
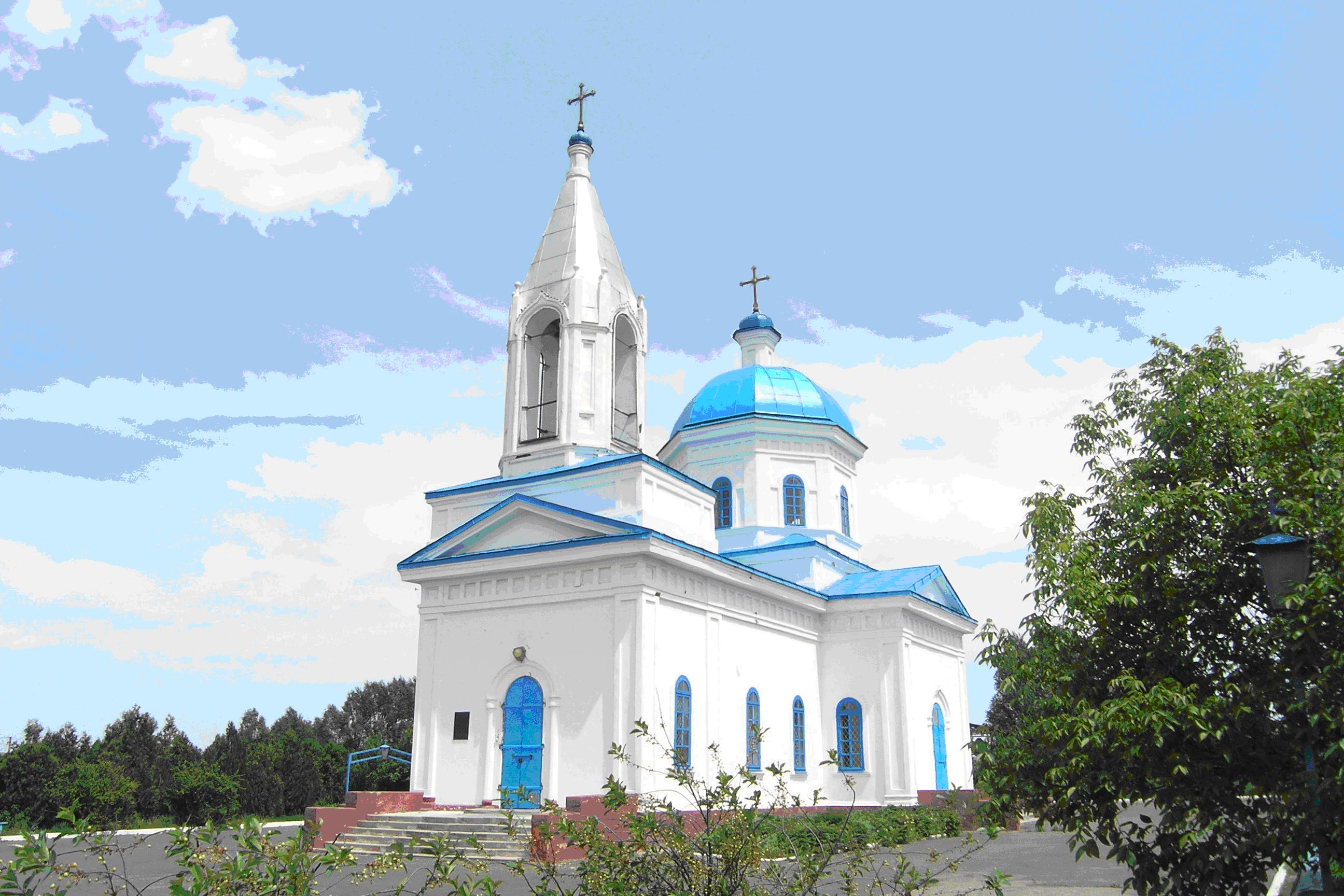

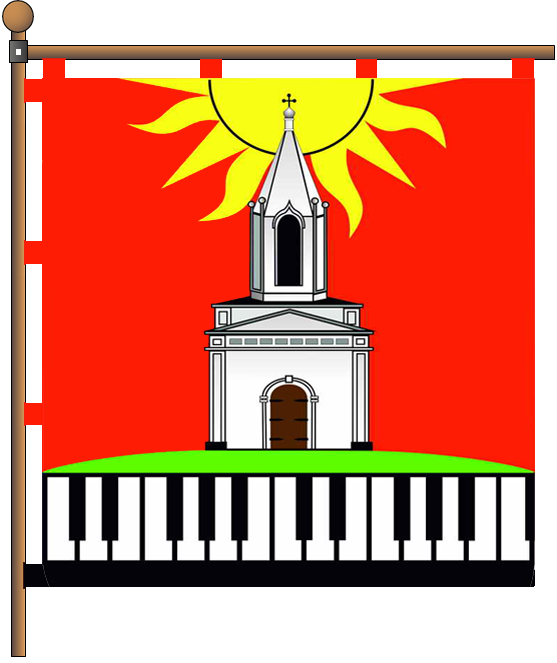
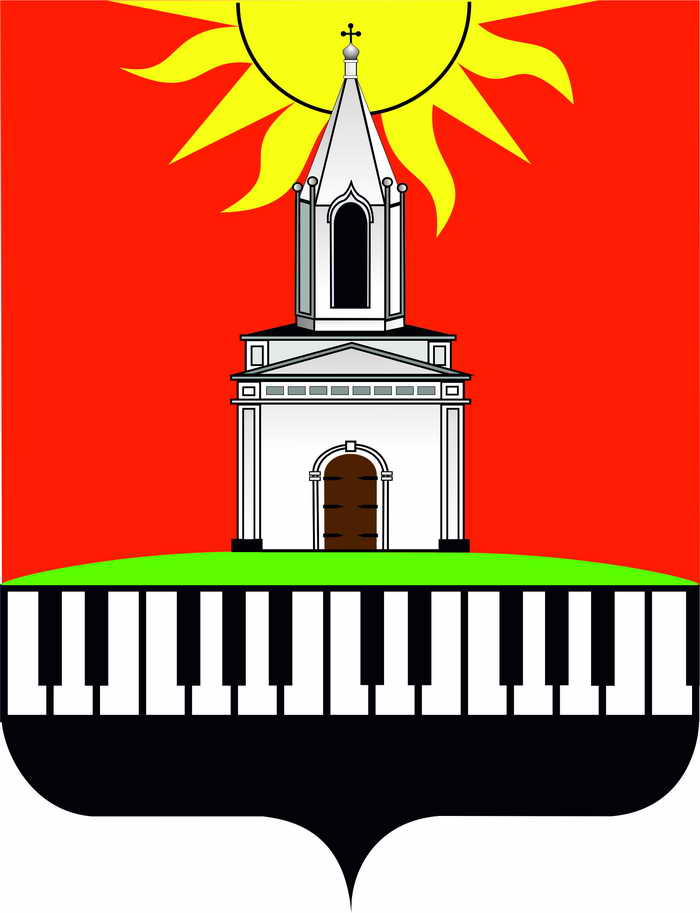
- Flag Coat of arms

- Location within Donetsk Oblast Location within Ukraine
- Coordinates: 48°2′56″N 37°11′26″E
- Country: Ukraine
- Oblast: Donetsk Oblast
- Raion: Pokrovsk Raion
- Hromada: Kurakhove urban hromada

Population (2017)
  - Total: 626
- Time zone: UTC+2 (EET)
  - Summer (DST): UTC+3 (EEST)

Sontsivka (Ukrainian: Сонцівка), known as Krasne (Ukrainian: Красне; Russian: Красное, romanized: Krasnoye) from 1927 to 2016, is a village in Kurakhove urban hromada, Pokrovsk Raion, Donetsk Oblast, Ukraine.

== History ==
The village, founded in 1785, was initially in the Bakhmutsky Uyezd of the Yekaterinoslav Governorate in the Russian Empire and was named after its owner Dmitri Dmitrievich Sontsov. In the Soviet Union, it was renamed Krasne in 1927 and kept the name until it was renamed Sontsivka in 2016 as part of decommunization in Ukraine. In 1967, a museum was opened in Sontsivka in memory of the native composer Sergei Prokofiev and in 1968, the local music school was named after him.

During the Russo-Ukrainian War on 9 November 2024, Russian troops entered Sontsivka, and captured it in mid-December 2024.

== Demographics ==
In November 2024, the population of the village was evacuated due to military operations.

Native language as of the Ukrainian Census of 2001:

- Ukrainian 92.45%
- Russian 7.42%

== Notable people ==
- Sergei Prokofiev (1891–1953), Russian composer.
