= Oleksandr Trepak =

Ukrainian major general

- Олександр Трепак

Commander of the Special Operations Forces
- Incumbent
- Assumed office 9 May 2024
- President: Volodymyr Zelenskyy
- Prime Minister: Denys Shmyhal
- Preceded by: Sergey Lupanchuk

Personal details
- Born: 15 September 1976 (age 50) Vinnytsia, Vinnytsia Oblast, Ukrainian SSR, Soviet Union
- Education: National Defence University
- Awards: Hero of Ukraine

Military service
- Allegiance: Ukraine (1991–present)
- Branch/service: Special Operations Forces
- Rank: Major General
- Commands: Special Operations Forces, 2024–
- Battles/wars: Russo-Ukrainian war; Second Battle of Donetsk Airport; Russian invasion of Ukraine

Oleksandr Sergiyovich Trepak (Ukrainian: Олександр Сергійович Трепак; born 15 September 1976) is a Ukrainian Major General and the Commander of the Special Operations Forces since 9 May 2024.

He is a member of the Headquarters of the Supreme Commander-in-Chief since 15 June 2024. Trepak was awarded the title Hero of Ukraine in May 2025.
