= Dachne, Pokrovsk Raion =

Village in Donetsk Oblast, Ukraine

Dachne Дачне
- Village
- Interactive map of Dachne
- Location of Dachne Dachne (Ukraine)
- Coordinates: 47°59′24″N 37°11′08″E
- Country: Ukraine
- Oblast: Donetsk Oblast
- Raion: Pokrovsk Raion
- Hromada: Kurakhove urban hromada
- Elevation: 121 m (397 ft)

Population (2001)
  - Total: 1,684
- Time zone: UTC+2
  - Summer (DST): UTC+3
- Postal code: 85611
- Area code: +380 6278

Dachne is a village in Kurakhove urban hromada, Pokrovsk Raion, Donetsk Oblast, Ukraine. The population was 1,684 at the 2001 Ukrainian census.

== History ==
During the Russo-Ukrainian War, Dachne first came in proximity of hostilities between Russian and Ukrainian forces in January 2025. After the capturing of the city of Kurakhove by Russian forces in the Battle of Kurakhove, the focus for their offensive turned to Dachne. According to DeepStateMap.Live, Russian forces entered Dachne on the 17 January. On 6 February, the village was fully captured by Russian forces. The Russian Ministry of Defense officially announced the capture of the village on 14 February 2025, while DeepStateMap.Live officially announced the Russian capture of the village on the 19th of February.

== Location ==
The distance to Marinka is about 25 km and is via a local highway. It is located immediately behind the dam of the Kurakhiv Reservoir. The village lands border the territory of the village of Ulakly, Velyka Novosilka Raion.

== Population ==
Native language as of the Ukrainian Census of 2001:

- Russian 52.79%
- Ukrainian 47.03%
- Bulgarian and Moldovan (Romanian) 0.06%.

== Notable people ==
- Serhiy Matyukhin (born 1980), Ukrainian footballer
