= Kreminna Balka =

Rural locality in Donetsk Oblast, Ukraine

Kreminna Balka Кремінна Балка
- Village
- Interactive map of Kreminna Balka
- Location of Kreminna Balka within Ukraine Kreminna Balka (Donetsk Oblast)
- Coordinates: 48°04′20″N 37°16′43″E
- Country: Ukraine
- Oblast: Donetsk Oblast
- Raion: Pokrovsk Raion
- Hromada: Kurakhove urban hromada
- Elevation: 168 m (551 ft)

Population (2001 census)
  - Total: 41
- Time zone: UTC+2 (EET)
  - Summer (DST): UTC+3 (EEST)
- Postal code: 85610
- Area code: +380 6278
- KATOTTH: UA14160110180090932

Kreminna Balka (Ukrainian: Кремінна Балка; Russian: Кременная Балка) is a village in Kurakhove urban hromada, Pokrovsk Raion, Donetsk Oblast, eastern Ukraine. It is located 39.07 kilometres (24.28 mi) west by north (WbN) from the centre of Donetsk city.

== History ==
=== Russian invasion of Ukraine ===
The village was captured by Russian forces in November 2024, during the full-scale Russian invasion of Ukraine.

== Demographics ==
As of the 2001 Ukrainian census, the settlement had 41 inhabitants, whose native languages were 78.05% Ukrainian and 21.95% Russian.
