= Yurii Sodol =

Ukrainian military general

Hero of Ukraine Yurii Sodol
- Юрій Содоль
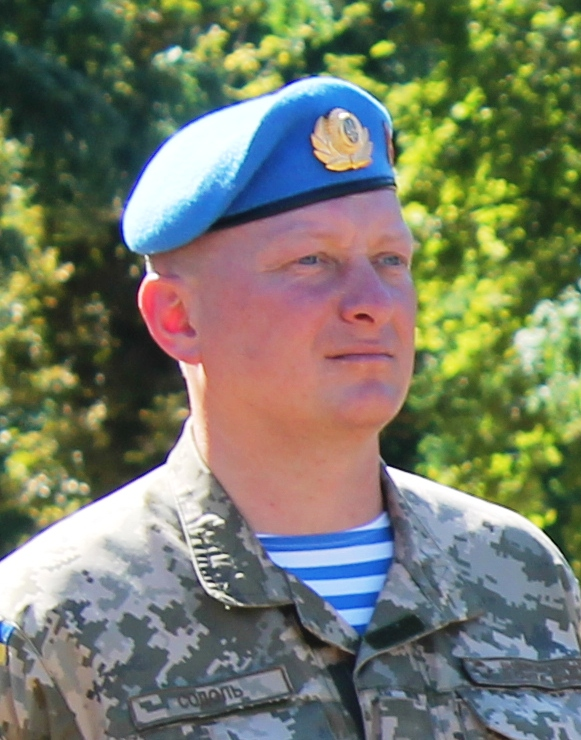
- Sodol in 2015

Personal details
- Born: Yurii Ivanovych Sodol; 26 December 1970 (age 55) Chuhuiv, Ukrainian SSR, Soviet Union
- Education: Sumy Higher Artillery Command School; National Defense University of Ukraine
- Awards: Hero of Ukraine

Military service
- Allegiance: Ukraine
- Branch/service: Ukrainian Marine Corps; Ukrainian Air Assault Forces
- Years of service: 2003−2024
- Rank: Lieutenant general
- Commands: Joint Forces Command of the Armed Forces of Ukraine; Ukrainian Marine Corps; 25th Airborne Brigade
- Battles/wars: Russo-Ukrainian war; War in Donbas

Yurii Ivanovych Sodol (Ukrainian: Юрій Іванович Содоль; born 26 December 1970) is a retired Ukrainian lieutenant general and was the commander of the Joint Forces of the Armed Forces of Ukraine from February to June 2024. Before that, he was the commander of the Ukrainian Marine Corps from 2018 to 2024.

== Early life and career ==
Sodol was born on 26 December 1970 in Chuhuiv, Ukrainian SSR, Soviet Union. He served in the Ukrainian Air Assault Forces, and until 2015 he was the commander of the 25th Airborne Brigade. From 2015 to 2018 he was the First Deputy Commander of the Air Assault Forces.

In March 2018 the Marine Corps Command was established as a new organization within the Ukrainian Navy, and Yuri Sodol was appointed its Commander. He was also promoted to lieutenant general. In May 2023 the Marine Corps was separated from the Navy to become an independent branch of the Armed Forces of Ukraine. Sodol remained in this role until February 2024 and is credited with modernizing Ukraine's Marine Corps along NATO standards during his tenure.

== Commander of Joint Forces ==
In mid-February 2024 he was appointed as the commander of the Ukrainian joint forces at the front line. Sodol's appointment followed the dismissal of Valerii Zaluzhnyi from his role as Commander-in-Chief of the Armed Forces of Ukraine.

=== Complaints ===
On 23 June 2024, Lieutenant Colonel Bohdan Krotevych, one of the commanders of the Azov Brigade, filed an official complaint with the State Bureau of Investigation (SBI). Krotevych has called for an investigation into the actions of an unnamed military general, accusing him of causing more Ukrainian soldier casualties than any Russian general.

While Krotevych did not disclose the general's name in his statement, sources from Ukrainska Pravda suggested that the general in question was Sodol.

For a long time before his dismissal, the People's Deputy Maryana Bezuhla was calling Sodol in interviews and on social media a "criminal" and a "murderer" on a daily basis.

On 26 June, The Washington Post published an article, which, contained alleged statements from Krotevych's letter to the SBI. The letter stated that Sodol did not lead the defence of Mariupol and did not spend any time in the city, but was awarded the title of Hero of Ukraine; that Sodol did not supply the Azov Brigade with ammunition or build defences in Mariupol before the offensive; that when one of the superiors in the city asked Sodol for instructions, he replied: "We are finished" and hung up; that Sodol recently ordered Azov to advance without artillery ammunition and that the arguments as to why this was not possible led to an internal investigation against the Azov commander; and that Sodol's decisions led to the deaths of thousands of soldiers, resulting in a weakened frontline position and the loss of a large amount of territory.

According to Ukrainska Pravda, as commander of Khortytsia operational-strategic group, Sodol was responsible for preparing the defence before the repeated Russian offensive on Kharkiv oblast. Sodol also was in charge of the amphibious operation to establish a bridgehead on the Dnieper in 2023, with fighting taking place at the village of Krynky in the Kherson Oblast. By June 2024, the operation failed and the Ukrainian marines took heavy casualties.

On 29 June, the Ukrainian media Ukrainska Pravda reported, citing its own sources, that the SBI had replied to Krotevych that it would check General Sodol's actions during the Russian offensive. Earlier, on 28 June, Krotevych stated that he had received a response from the SBI, but was dissatisfied with it.

=== Dismissal ===
On 24 June 2024, President Volodymyr Zelenskyy announced the replacement of Lieutenant General Yurii Sodol as the Commander of the Joint Forces of the Ukrainian Armed Forces. Brigadier General Andrii Hnatov was appointed as his successor. Hnatov's appointment was positively received by Krotevych, who described him as a decent military officer.

On 1 November, according to Ukrainska Pravda and Maryana Bezuhla, Yurii Sodol was dismissed from military service based on the conclusion of a military medical board.

== Awards ==
- Hero of Ukraine (28 February 2022)
- Order of Bohdan Khmelnytsky, 3rd class (22 January 2015)
- Order for Courage, 3rd class (14 October 2014)
- Medal For Military Service to Ukraine (3 December 2010)
- Medal "For conscientious service" 2nd class
- Medal "15 years of the Armed Forces of Ukraine"
- Medal "Veteran of the service"
- Award of the Minister of Defense of Ukraine "For Valor and Honor"
- Badge "For Achievements in Military Service" 2nd and 1st classes
- Badge "For Military Valor"

Military offices
Preceded by Oleh Svystak	Commander of the 25th Airborne Brigade; 2007–2015	Succeeded by Oleh Zenchenko
Preceded by Andrii Kovalchuk	Deputy Commander of the Ukrainian Air Assault Forces; 2016–2018	Succeeded by Yevhen Moisiuk
Preceded by Serhii Tartakovskyi	Commander of the Ukrainian Marine Corps; 2018–2024	Succeeded by Dmytro Delyatytskyi
Preceded by Serhii Naiev	Commander of the Joint Forces of the Armed Forces of Ukraine; 2024	Succeeded by Andrii Hnatov
