= 2025 Russian strikes on Ukrainian training grounds =

Missile attack on Ukraine

- Type: Missile strike
- Target: Ukrainian Ground Forces
- Date: June and July 2025
- Executed by: Russian Air Force
- Casualties: Per Ukraine: June: 17 killed 74 wounded July: 17 killed 118 wounded Total: 192 wounded 34 killed

On 1 June 2025, at 12:50 local time, Russian forces launched a missile strike a training ground of the Ukrainian Army in the Dnipropetrovsk region, 100 km from the frontline inside Ukraine. The training ground was administered by the 239th training center based in Cherkasy. After the attack, the Commander of the Ukrainian Ground Forces Major General Mykhailo Drapatyi resigned from his post.

== Background ==
On 1 March 2025, a Russian Iskander-M missile struck a Ukrainian training ground in Cherkasy killing from 32 to 39 soldiers and wounding 90 more. After the attack Drapatyi promised to start an investigation regarding the attack and the loss of life.

On 20 May 2025, a Russian missile strike struck a Ukrainian training center in Sumy Oblast, killing 6 soldiers and injuring 10 according to the Ukrainian National Guard.

== List of strikes ==
On 1 June 2025, a Russian missile, likely an Iskander struck an undisclosed Ukrainian military training ground located 100 km from the frontline killing at least 12 soldiers and wounding many more. According to the spokesman of the Ukrainian Army, Vitaliy Sarantsev, soldiers were alerted in time and stayed in shelters, others didn't have the time to reach them. The Commander of the Ukrainian Ground Forces Major General Mykhailo Drapatyi resigned from his post following the attack.

On 5 June, four days latter Russian forces attacked another training ground on Poltava killing two servicemen. On 22 June, Russian forces launched another attack on a training ground of a Ukrainian Mechanized Brigade killing 3 Ukrainian soldiers and wounding 14.

On 21 July, another Russian Iskander missile stuck a training ground in the city of Kropyvnytskyi killing 15 soldiers including twelve foreign fighters that were present, from United States, Colombia, Taiwan, Denmark and other countries, another 100 were reported wounded. On 29 July another Ukrainian military camp was hit leaving 3 dead and 18 wounded.

== Later attacks ==
On 12 August, Ukrainian Ground Forces reported that a Russian missile attack with cluster munitions killed one soldier and wounded another 11 at an undisclosed military training center in Ukraine.

On 24 September 2025, a Russian missile attack using Iskander missiles targeted a training base of the 242nd Combined Arms Training Grounds near the village of Honcharivske in the Chernihiv Oblast, killing and wounding personnel.
