= Voznesenka, Donetsk Oblast =

Voznesenka Вознесенка
- Village
- Voznesenka shown within Ukraine Voznesenka shown within Donetsk
- Coordinates: 48°3′42″N 37°15′26″E
- Country: Ukraine
- Oblast: Donetsk Oblast
- Raion: Pokrovsk Raion
- Hromada: Kurakhove urban hromada
- Elevation: 147 m (482 ft)

Population (2001)
  - Total: 52
- Postal code: 85610
- Area code: +380 6278

Voznesenka (Ukrainian: Вознесенка; Russian: Вознесенка) is a village in Pokrovsk Raion, Donetsk Oblast, Ukraine.

== History ==
On November 14, 2024, the Russian Defence Ministry claimed that Russian forces had taken control of the village. The village is outside the larger town of Kurakhove.

== Demographics ==
According to the 2001 census, the village had a population of 52 people, 69.23% listed Ukrainian as their native language and 30.77% listed Russian as their native language.

== See also ==
- List of villages in Donetsk Oblast
