= Odesa operational-strategic group =

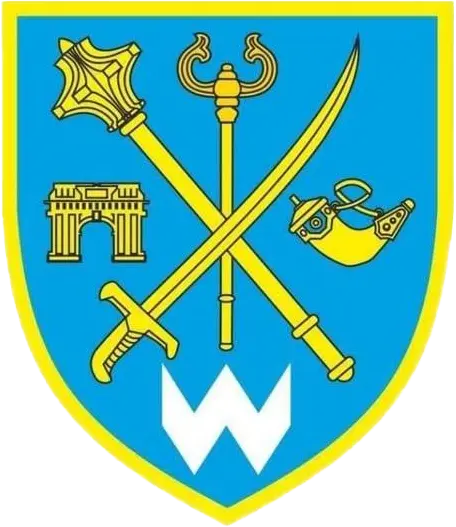
- Patch of Odesa OSG
- Active: 2022
- Disbanded: September 30, 2025
- Country: Ukraine
- Branch: Ukrainian Ground Forces
- Type: Regional command

Commanders
- Current commander: Major General Eduard Moskaliov

The Odesa operational-strategic group was a formation of the Ukrainian Ground Forces in Ukraine active in the Russian invasion of Ukraine. The operational group was under the command of JFO Major General Eduard Moskaliov.

== Structure ==
The units within the Odesa operational-strategic group included:

- 63rd Separate Mechanized Brigade
- 126th Territorial Defense Brigade
