= Sukhi Yaly (village) =

Village in Donetsk Oblast, Ukraine

Sukhi Yaly Сухі Яли
- Village
- Interactive map of Sukhi Yaly
- Location of Sukhi Yaly within Ukraine Sukhi Yaly (Ukraine)
- Coordinates: 47°56′57″N 37°07′13″E
- Country: Ukraine
- Oblast: Donetsk Oblast
- Raion: Pokrovsk Raion
- Hromada: Kurakhove urban hromada
- Elevation: 106 m (348 ft)

Population (2001 census)
  - Total: 412
- Time zone: UTC+2 (EET)
  - Summer (DST): UTC+3 (EEST)
- Postal code: 85611
- Area code: +380 6278
- KATOTTH: UA14160110230060440

Sukhi Yaly (Ukrainian: Сухі Яли; Russian: Сухие Ялы) is a village in Kurakhove urban hromada, Pokrovsk Raion, Donetsk Oblast, eastern Ukraine. It is located 51 kilometres (32 mi) west by south (WbS) from the centre of Donetsk city.

== Geography ==
The village lies on the left bank of the Sukhi Yaly river. The absolute height is 106 metres above sea level.

== History ==
=== Russian invasion of Ukraine ===
The village was captured by Russian forces in December 2024, during the full-scale Russian invasion of Ukraine.

== Demographics ==
As of the 2001 Ukrainian census, the settlement had 412 inhabitants, whose native languages were 14.56% Ukrainian, 83.74% Russian and 0.24% Belarusian.
