= Yantarne, Donetsk Oblast =

Village in Donetsk Oblast, Ukraine

Yantarne Янтарне
- Village
- Interactive map of Yantarne
- Location of Yantarne within Ukraine Yantarne (Donetsk Oblast)
- Coordinates: 47°56′37″N 37°09′55″E
- Country: Ukraine
- Oblast: Donetsk Oblast
- Raion: Pokrovsk Raion
- Hromada: Kurakhove urban hromada
- Elevation: 148 m (486 ft)

Population (2001 census)
  - Total: 146
- Time zone: UTC+2 (EET)
  - Summer (DST): UTC+3 (EEST)
- Postal code: 85611
- Area code: +380 6278
- KATOTTH: UA14160110260096084

Yantarne (Ukrainian: Янтарне; Russian: Янтарное) is a village in Kurakhove urban hromada, Pokrovsk Raion, Donetsk Oblast, eastern Ukraine. It is located 48.39 kilometres (30.07 mi) west-southwest (WSW) from the centre of Donetsk city.

== History ==
=== Russian invasion of Ukraine ===
The village was captured by Russian forces in January 2025, during the full-scale Russian invasion of Ukraine.

== Demographics ==
As of the 2001 Ukrainian census, the settlement had 146 inhabitants, whose native languages were 21.10% Ukrainian, 72.97% Russian and 1.35% Bulgarian.
