= Novoselydivka =

Rural locality in Donetsk Oblast, Ukraine

Novoselydivka Новоселидівка
- Village
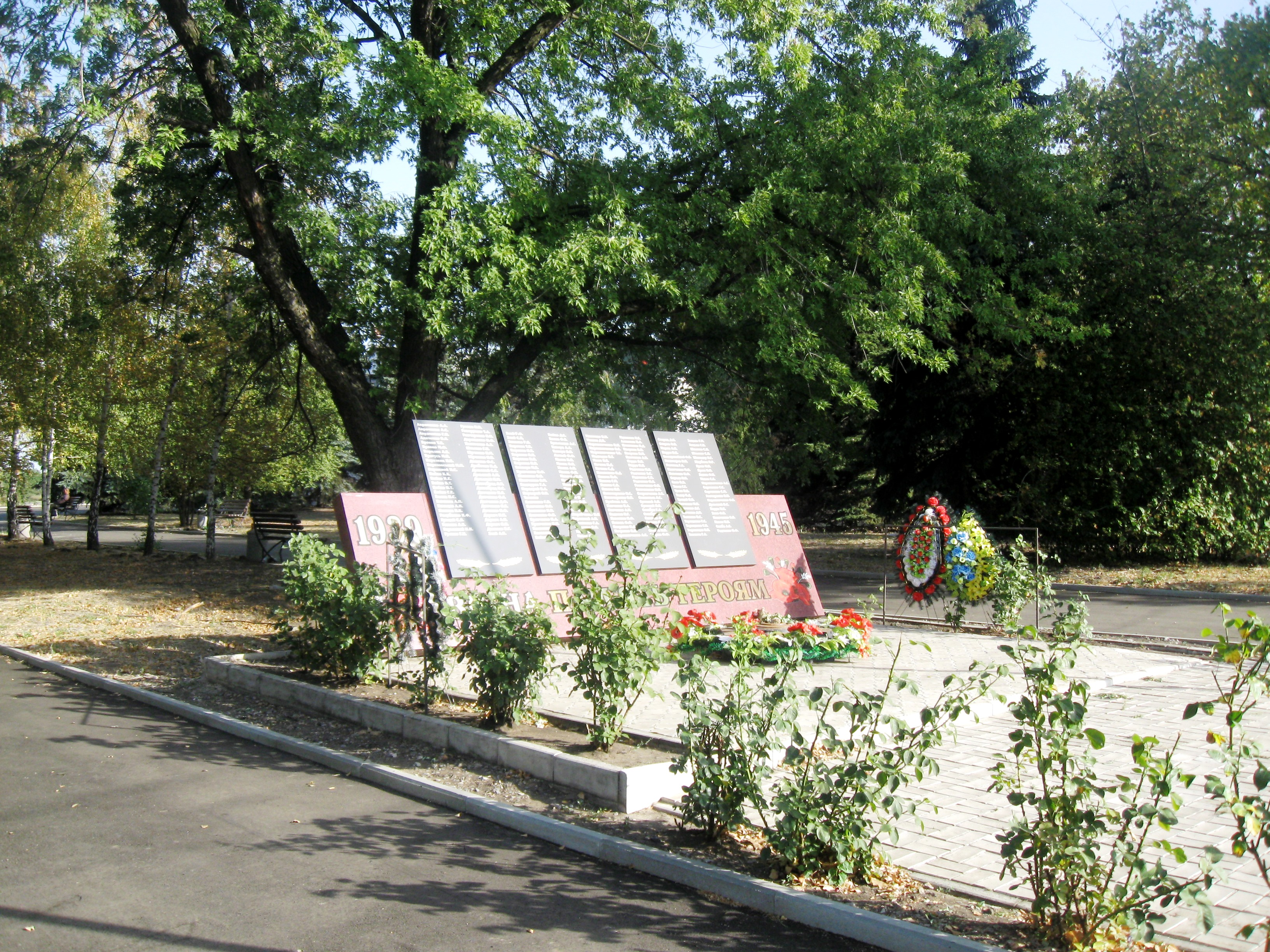
- A memorial

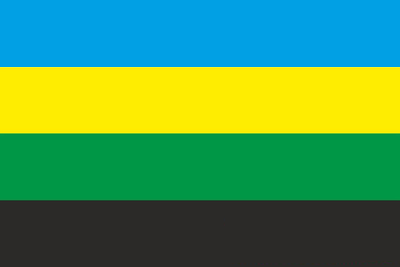
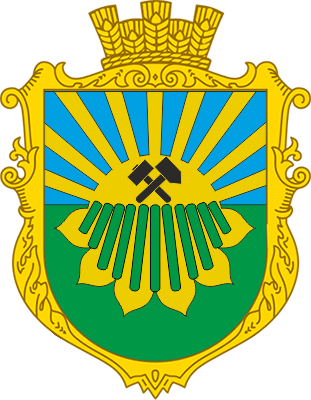
- Flag Seal
- Interactive map of Novoselydivka
- Location of Novoselydivka within Ukraine Novoselydivka (Donetsk Oblast)
- Coordinates: 48°03′16″N 37°17′32″E
- Country: Ukraine
- Oblast: Donetsk Oblast
- Raion: Pokrovsk Raion
- Hromada: Kurakhove urban hromada

Area
  - Total: 1.11 km^{2} (0.43 sq mi)
- Elevation: 166 m (545 ft)

Population (2001 census)
  - Total: 987
  - Density: 889/km^{2} (2,300/sq mi)
- Time zone: UTC+2 (EET)
  - Summer (DST): UTC+3 (EEST)
- Postal code: 85610
- Area code: +380 6278
- KATOTTH: UA14160110200090457

Novoselydivka (Ukrainian: Новоселидівка; Russian: Новоселидовка) is a village in Kurakhove urban hromada, Pokrovsk Raion, Donetsk Oblast, eastern Ukraine. It is located 38.22 kilometres (23.75 mi) west by north (WbN) from the centre of Donetsk city.

== History ==
The settlement was founded at the beginning of the 20th century.

=== Russian invasion of Ukraine ===
The village was captured by Russian forces in November 2024, during the full-scale Russian invasion of Ukraine.

== Demographics ==
As of the 2001 Ukrainian census, the settlement had 987 inhabitants, whose native languages were 79.58% Ukrainian, 20.12% Russian and 0.20% Belarusian.
