= Vovchenka =

Vovchenka Вовченка
- Village
- Vovchenka shown within Ukraine Vovchenka shown within Donetsk
- Coordinates: 48°0′37″N 37°21′40″E
- Country: Ukraine
- Oblast: Donetsk Oblast
- Raion: Pokrovsk Raion
- Hromada: Kurakhove urban hromada
- Elevation: 113 m (371 ft)

Population (2001)
  - Total: 243
- Postal code: 85610
- Area code: +380 6278

Vovchenka (Ukrainian: Вовченка; Russian: Волченка) is a Ukrainian settlement in the Pokrovsk Raion of Donetsk Oblast.

== History ==
=== Russian invasion ===
On 10 November 2024, Russia claimed to have captured the settlement.

== Demographics ==
According to the 2001 Ukrainian census, the village had a population of 243 people. The native language as of 2001 are as shown here.

Native languages in Vovchenka
	percent
Ukrainian	79.01%
Russian	20.99%
