= Stari Terny =

Rural locality in Donetsk Oblast, Ukraine

Stari Terny Старі Терни
- Rural settlement
- Interactive map of Stari Terny
- Location of Stari Terny within Ukraine Stari Terny (Donetsk Oblast)
- Coordinates: 48°00′50″N 37°12′24″E
- Country: Ukraine
- Oblast: Donetsk Oblast
- Raion: Pokrovsk Raion
- Hromada: Kurakhove urban hromada
- Elevation: 127 m (417 ft)

Population (2001 census)
  - Total: 8
- Time zone: UTC+2 (EET)
  - Summer (DST): UTC+3 (EEST)
- Postal code: 85612
- Area code: +380 6278
- KATOTTH: UA14160110280090708

Stari Terny (Ukrainian: Старі Терни; Russian: Старые Терны) is a rural settlement (selyshche) in Kurakhove urban hromada, Pokrovsk Raion, Donetsk Oblast, eastern Ukraine. It is located 44.0 kilometres (27.3 mi) west from the centre of Donetsk city.

== Geography ==
The village lies on the right bank of the Vovcha river. The absolute height is 127 metres above sea level.

== History ==
=== Russian invasion of Ukraine ===
On 11 November 2024, during the Russian invasion of Ukraine, the Kurakhove Reservoir dam, located near the settlement, was destroyed, causing water to flow into the Vovcha River and posing a threat of flooding for residents of villages on the river. The settlement came under attack by Russian forces in November 2024 and was captured in early December.

== Demographics ==
As of the 2001 Ukrainian census, the settlement had 8 inhabitants, whose native languages were 37.50% Ukrainian and 62.50% Russian.
