= Cherkaske =

Cherkaske (Ukrainian: Черкаське) is the name of two urban localities in Ukraine.

- Cherkaske, an urban-type settlement in Novomoskovsk Raion, Dnipropetrovsk Oblast
- Cherkaske, an urban-type settlement in Sloviansk Raion, Donetsk Oblast

== See also ==
- Cherkasskoye
