= Ostrivske =

Ostrivske Острівське
- Village
- Ostrivske shown within Ukraine Ostrivske shown within Donetsk
- Coordinates: 48°0′6″N 37°20′46″E
- Country: Ukraine
- Oblast: Donetsk Oblast
- Raion: Pokrovsk Raion
- Hromada: Kurakhove urban hromada
- Elevation: 123 m (404 ft)

Population (2001)
  - Total: 323
- Postal code: 85613
- Area code: +380 6278

Ostrivske (Ukrainian: Острівське; Russian: Островское) is a rural settlement near Kurakhove in Pokrovsk Raion, Donetsk Oblast. It was captured by Russian forces during the Russian invasion of Ukraine in October 2024.

== Demographics ==
Native language as of the Ukrainian Census of 2001:

Native languages in Ostrivske
	percent
Ukrainian	55.42%
Russian	43.03%
Belarusian	1.55%
