= Mykhailo Drapatyi =

Ukrainian military officer (born 1982)

- Михайло Драпатий
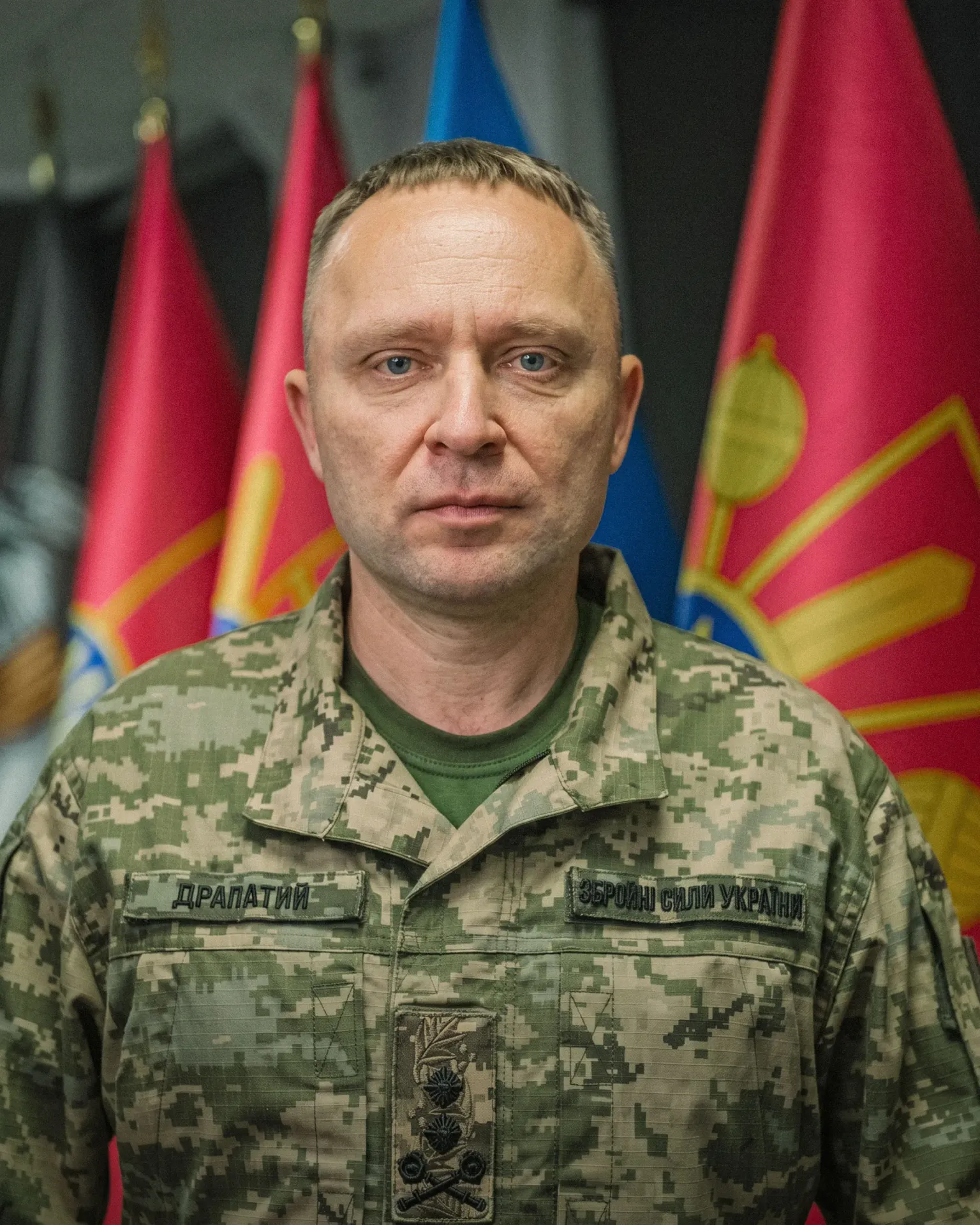
- Official portrait, 2026

Commander-in-Chief of the Armed Forces of Ukraine
- Incumbent
- Assumed office 21 July 2026
- President: Volodymyr Zelenskyy
- Prime Minister: Serhii Koretskyi
- Deputy: Artem Martynenko
- Preceded by: Oleksandr Syrskyi

Commander of the Joint Forces of the Armed Forces of Ukraine
- In office 3 June 2025 – 21 July 2026
- President: Volodymyr Zelenskyy
- Prime Minister: Denys Shmyhal; Yulia Svyrydenko; Serhii Koretskyi
- Preceded by: Andrii Hnatov

Commander of the Ukrainian Ground Forces
- In office 29 November 2024 – 1 June 2025
- President: Volodymyr Zelenskyy
- Prime Minister: Denys Shmyhal
- Preceded by: Oleksandr Pavliuk
- Succeeded by: Hennadii Shapovalov

Personal details
- Born: Mykhailo Vasyliovych Drapatyi; 21 November 1982 (age 43) Kamianets-Podilskyi, Ukrainian SSR, Soviet Union
- Children: 2
- Education: National Defense University of Ukraine Ivan-Chernyakhovsky
- Awards: List: Cross of Military Merit; Order of Bohdan Khmelnytsky, 1st - 3rd class; Hero of Ukraine; Firearms award of the Ministry of Defense of Ukraine; Queen's Sword of the United Kingdom

Military service
- Allegiance: Ukraine
- Branch: Ukrainian Ground Forces
- Years of service: 2004–present
- Rank: Major General
- Commands: Commander-in-Chief of the Armed Forces of Ukraine; Commander of the Ground Forces; Odesa Operational-Strategic Group; 58th Motorized Brigade; 30th Mechanized Brigade; 2nd Battalion, 72nd Mechanized Brigade
- Battles/wars: Russo-Ukrainian war; War in Donbas; Battle of Mariupol (2014); Ukrainian-Russian border clashes (2014); Battle of Artemivsk; Battle of Horlivka; Russian invasion of Ukraine

Mykhailo Vasyliovych Drapatyi (Ukrainian: Михайло Васильович Драпатий; born 21 November 1982) is a Ukrainian military officer who has served as the Commander-in-Chief of the Armed Forces of Ukraine since 21 July 2026. Prior to this, he was the Commander of the Joint Forces of the Armed Forces of Ukraine from 3 June 2025. He served as commander of the Ukrainian Ground Forces from 2024 to 2025.

Aside from his current role, he has held several notable commands including second battalion of the 72nd Mechanized Brigade during the 2014 Battle of Mariupol, the Zelenopillia rocket attack and the subsequent breakout, Chief of Staff and First Deputy Commander of the 30th Mechanized Brigade, commander of the 58th Motorized Infantry Brigade and commander of several operational-strategic and operational-tactical groups.

He has also received several notable awards, including the full Order of Bohdan Khmelnytskyi, the Cross of Military Merit and Hero of Ukraine.

== Early life and education ==
Drapatyi was born in Kamianets-Podilskyi, Khmelnytskyi Oblast, on 21 November 1982. After graduating from high school, he enrolled in the Kharkiv Institute of Tank Troops. He graduated in 2004, after which he began service as a Lieutenant in the 72nd Mechanized Brigade, which is based in Bila Tserkva, Kyiv Oblast.

== Military career ==
His first command was as a Major, commander of second battalion, 72nd Mechanized Brigade. His battalion was deployed to eastern Ukraine in April 2014, taking part in the Battle of Mariupol in May that year. On 9 May, armed separatists attempted to seize the Mariupol police department. Drapatyi's battalion was sent with armoured vehicles to free hostages and reinforce the units that were defending the station. Leading at the head of a column of four armoured vehicles, his BMP smashed through a barricade. Videos of this were broadcast on international news. (Note: The video can be seen here: "Tank APC Jumps Barricade, Mariupol". BS TV. 10 May 2014. Best-known remix: "Tank Smashes Through Barricade - Primo Victoria". SebastianTV. 23 March 2018. "Just a Ukrainian BMP smashing through barricades.")

In June that year, the first and second battalions were sent on a raid along the Russian border alongside the 3rd Special Forces Regiment, 24th Mechanized Brigade, 51st Guards Mechanized Brigade and the 79th Air Assault Brigade. They were tasked with cutting off the separatists from Russia. They travelled over 160 kilometres, taking control of several settlements, though were eventually encircled by both Russian and Donetsk People's Republic forces near Chervonopartyzansk, Luhansk Oblast, coming under BM-21 Grad and BM-27 Uragan rocket fire between 4–7 August.

To break out of the encirclement, they had to pass through 40 kilometres of Russian-held territory without support and with unreliable communication. The first battalion surrendered, destroying their weapons and withdrawing across the nearby Russian border. Drapatyi led the remaining units to Zelenopillia, Donetsk Oblast, and on 7 August he led a breakout with the 260 soldiers and 30 pieces of military equipment that remained, lasting three days. The breakout was successful, allowing them to return to Ukrainian lines, losing one soldier in the process.

After his battalion was reconstituted, he became a Lieutenant Colonel, enrolling in the National Defense University of Ukraine in 2014 and, after graduating, became Chief of Staff and First Deputy Commander of the 30th Mechanized Brigade.

He took command of the 58th Motorized Infantry Brigade on 17 October 2016. In June 2017, he received his Masters at the operational-tactical level and, in July, began directing their operations in the Joint Forces Operation zone around the Bakhmut highway. In April 2019 he became Colonel, later handing command over in August 2019, so that he could undertake the two-year operational-tactical and operational-strategic courses at the National Defence University. He graduated on 18 June 2021 as the top graduate, for which he was presented the Queen's Sword of the United Kingdom by then British Ambassador to Ukraine, Melinda Simmons.

He was then appointed Deputy Commander of Operational Command North. Alongside this, he was appointed Deputy Commander of the Joint Forces of the Armed Forces of Ukraine for training in August 2021, later being promoted to Brigadier General on 6 December that year. On 17 March 2022, he was appointed Deputy Commander of the Southern Command of the UGF, leading the Kakhovka Operational Group of Forces (OGF) from 15 June and the Kryvyi Rih OGF from 30 September. As part of the latter, his forces stopped the offensive and counterattacked, advancing 6–23 kilometres and liberating several settlements in Kherson and Dnipropetrovsk Oblasts.

In 2023, he was appointed commander of the Odesa Operational-Strategic Group. In this role, he increased the use of drones, electronic warfare, and their coordination. Some time prior to handing over command on 12 January 2024, he commanded the Kherson Special Operations Command. He was appointed the Deputy Chief of the General Staff for training on 10 February 2024.

Following the commencement of Russia's Kharkiv Offensive on 10 May 2024, it was discovered that the soldiers under the Kharkiv Operational-Tactical Group were underprepared despite several prior indications that an offensive would happen. Drapatyi was selected to replace the then commander of the group, Yuriy Halushkin, on 11 May, officially taking command the following day while remaining in his role as Deputy Chief of the General Staff. Coordination improved, allowing the situation to stabilise and preventing further advances by Russian forces, later leading to a Ukrainian advance in Lyptsi.

Drapatyi took command of the Luhansk Operational-Tactical Group between 5–10 September 2024, where he again improved the situation on the front line.

=== Commander of the Ukrainian Ground Forces ===
He was appointed the Commander of the Ukrainian Ground Forces on 29 November 2024, becoming the youngest officer to hold that post in Ukraine's history. Drapatyi announced on 12 December 2024 that he would be conducting major reforms within the Ukrainian Ground Forces (UGF), including an updated recruitment system to eliminate corruption, improved training to better fit battlefield needs and the integration of advanced technology into training. In January 2025, the Defense Ministry’s Main Inspectorate conducted a comprehensive inspection of the UGF to evaluate management, processes, and adherence to its rules.

Of particular note were issues with the 155th Mechanized Brigade and the 156th Separate Mechanised Brigade. The 155th Mechanised Brigade, as of November 2024, had had approximately 1,700 defectors, a third of its service members at the time. The Economist noted that "On its return the brigade was splintered: units and kit were hived off to other brigades, trained specialists were reassigned to infantry platoons, and desertions spiked as inexperienced units were sent to forward positions and took heavy losses."

A hotline for the unit was set up, and several measures were implemented to improve it, such as enhancing training, recruiting experienced officers and commanders, and supplying the unit with further equipment. Similar issues were noted with the 156th Separate Mechanised Brigade and similar measures were implemented.

In addition to his duties as Commander of the UGF, on 26 January 2025 President Volodymyr Zelenskyy appointed Drapatyi the commander of the Khortytsia Operational-Strategic Group, an area Zelenskyy described as "the most intense areas of combat".

On 1 June 2025, Drapatyi resigned from the role of commander of the Ukrainian Ground Forces following an attack on a training base that killed twelve soldiers and wounded 60 others. According to the Institute for the Study of War, Drapatyi stated that his reasons for resigning were failing "to ensure the proper execution of his orders", along with attempt to establish standard for personal accountability – "Ukraine's military is disadvantaged by a command culture that is unwilling to accept personal responsibility for and learn from battlefield failures." He also stated that he must take responsibility and resign, as his efforts to root out this attitude from the Ukrainian Ground Forces failed.

=== Commander of the Joint Forces ===
On 3 June 2025, Drapatyi was appointed by Zelenskyy to become head of the Ukrainian military's Joint Forces Command, and was succeeded as Commander of the Ground Forces by Hennadii Shapovalov on 19 June 2025.

=== Commander-in-Chief of the Armed Forces ===
On 21 July 2026, Drapatyi was appointed Commander-in-Chief of the Armed Forces of Ukraine, replacing Oleksandr Syrskyi after a week of protests against the removal of Defense Minister Mykhailo Fedorov. Drapatyi was a supporter of Fedorov's reforms in the military, which were mainly aimed at technological modernization, and is expected to continue many of the measures advanced by Fedorov. Fedorov praised the appointment, calling Drapatyi "a breath of fresh air and a new source of hope."

== Public statements ==
In a 2023 interview recorded as part of a documentary project by Ukrainer and released in full in July 2026 following his appointment as Commander-in-Chief of the Armed Forces of Ukraine, Drapatyi described Russia as "a nation, along with its leadership, that has no right to exist", arguing that, in his view, the Russian nation had remained fundamentally unchanged in its mentality and imperial ambitions for over a millennium.

In the same interview, Drapatyi said that he had believed a war with Russia to be inevitable even before 2014, arguing that after Ukraine gained independence in 1991, successive governments had failed to pursue full political and strategic independence from Russia. He also stated that the Donetsk and Luhansk regions are made up of "criminal elements" with people who "want handouts and don't want to work," and had historically received insufficient attention in terms of Ukrainization, contributing to the emergence of a population segment that lacked a Ukrainian national consciousness.

== Awards ==
Drapatyi received the full Order of Bohdan Khmelnytskyi, his first in August 2016, his second in 2018, and his third in July 2022. He has received other awards, including the Cross of Military Merit and the Firearms award of the Ministry of Defense of Ukraine.

== Personal life ==
Drapatyi is married and has two children: a son and a daughter.
