= Illinka, Kurakhove urban hromada, Pokrovsk Raion, Donetsk Oblast =

Urban locality in Donetsk Oblast, Ukraine

Illinka Іллінка
- Rural settlement
- Interactive map of Illinka
- Location of Illinka Illinka (Ukraine)
- Coordinates: 48°00′41″N 37°18′12″E
- Country: Ukraine
- Oblast: Donetsk Oblast
- Raion: Pokrovsk Raion
- Hromada: Kurakhove urban hromada
- Elevation: 127 m (417 ft)

Population (2022)
  - Total: 440
- Time zone: UTC+2
  - Summer (DST): UTC+3
- Postal code: 85615
- Area code: +380 6278

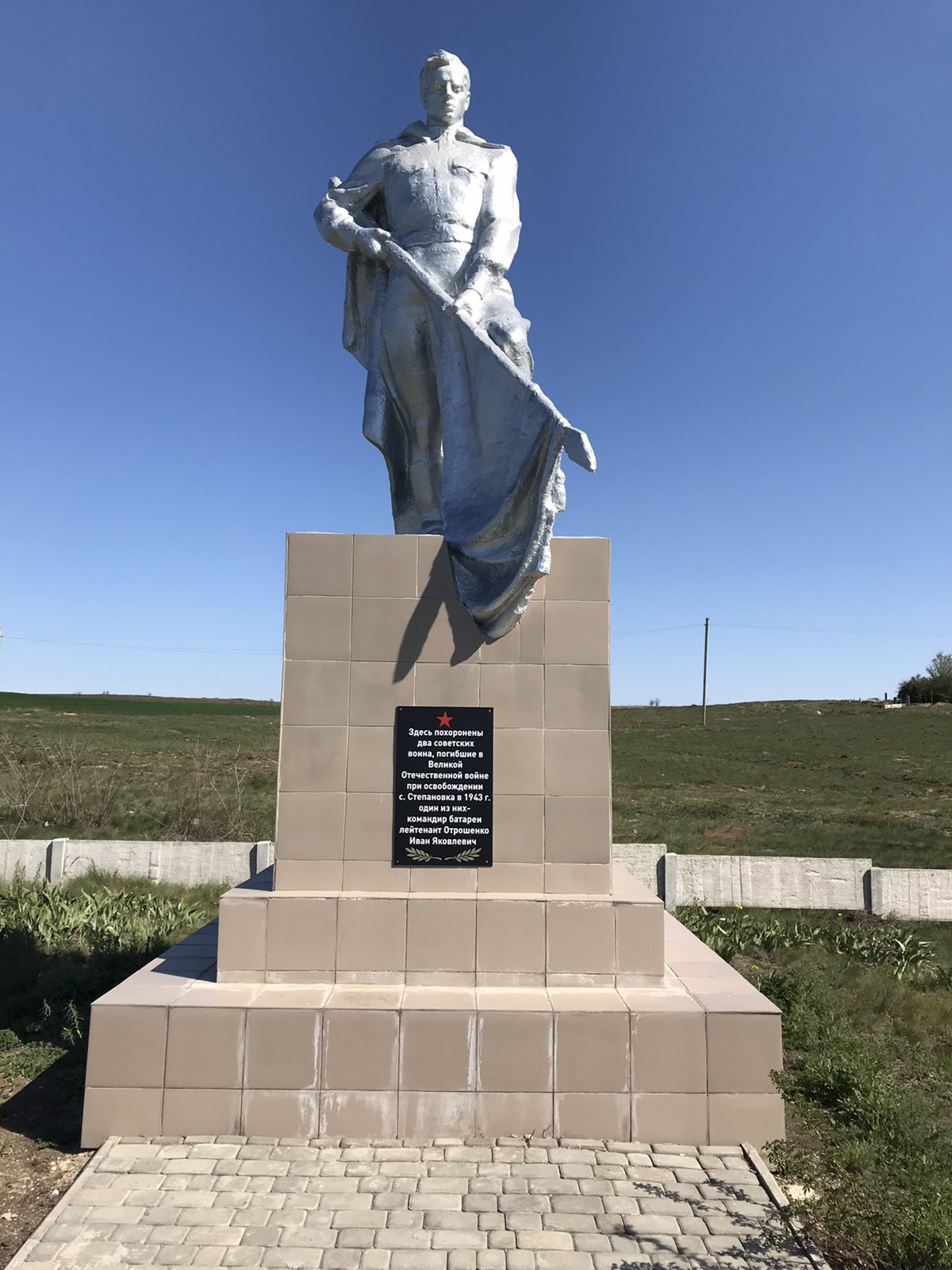
Mass grave of soldiers of the Southern Front, Ilyinka, Stepanivka St.

Illinka (Ukrainian: Іллінка) is a rural settlement in Pokrovsk Raion, Donetsk Oblast, eastern Ukraine. It is part of Kurakhove urban hromada, one of the hromadas of Ukraine. Population: 440 (2022 estimate).

== History ==
On 13 November 2024, Illinka was captured by Russian forces during the Russian invasion of Ukraine.

== Demographics ==
Native language as of the Ukrainian Census of 2001:

- Ukrainian 83.91%
- Russian 16.09%
