= Dnipro operational-strategic group =

Dnipro operational strategic group (2025–present) Khortytsia operational strategic group (2022–2025)
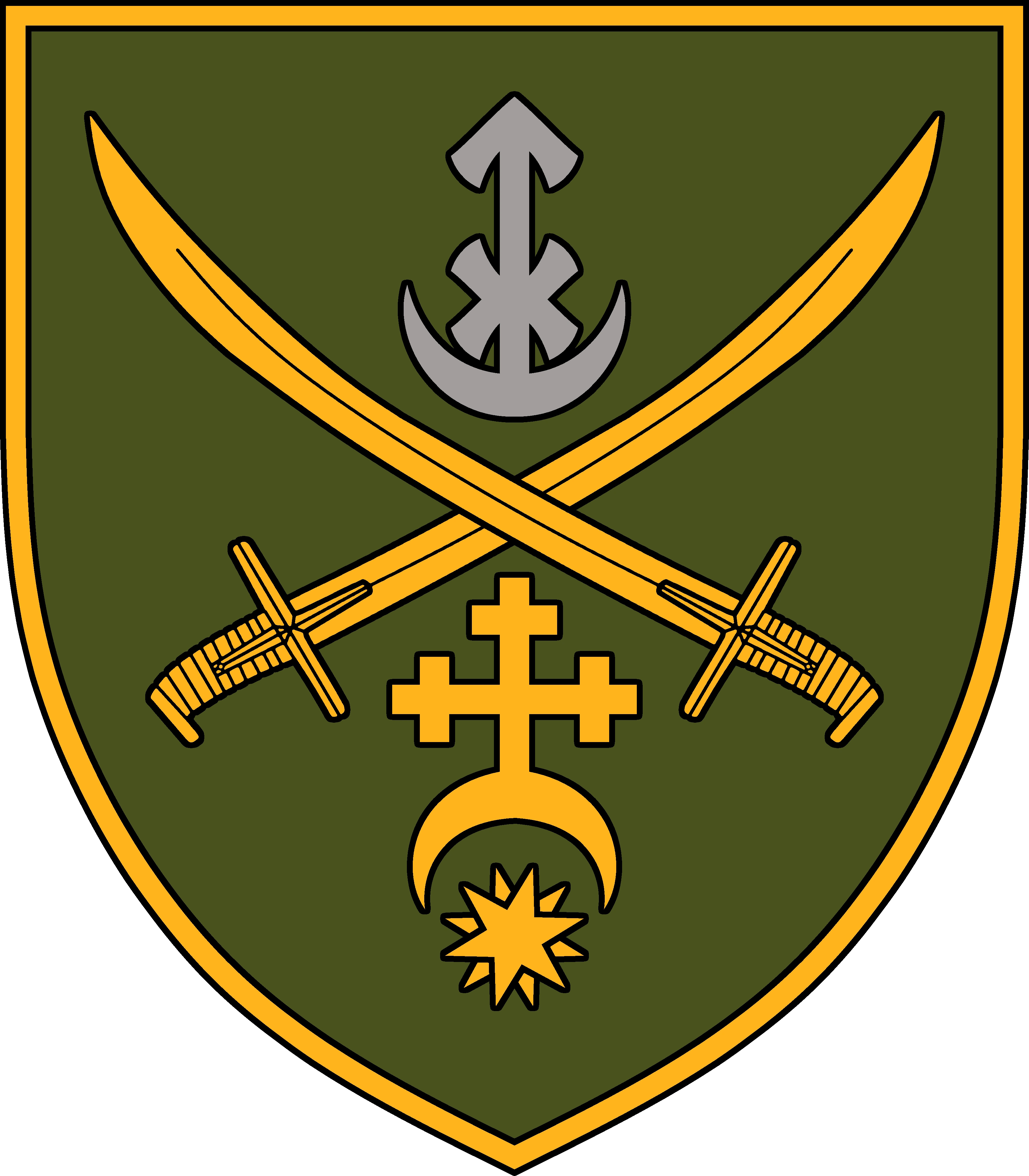
- Active: 2022 – September 2025
- Country: Ukraine
- Branch: Ukrainian Ground Forces
- Type: Regional command
- Engagements: Russo-Ukrainian war (2022–present); 2022 Kharkiv counteroffensive; Battle of Bakhmut; Battle of Vuhledar; Battle of Kurakhove

Commanders
- Current commander: Maj. Gen. Mykhailo Drapatyi
- Spokesperson: Col. Viktor Trehubov
- Notable commanders: Oleksandr Syrskyi; Yurii Sodol; Andrii Hnatov

The Dnipro operational-strategic group (Ukrainian: Оперативно-стратегічне угруповання військ Дніпро), formerly the Khortytsia operational-strategic group, was a formation of the Ukrainian Ground Forces during the Russo-Ukrainian war. The Khortytsia operational-strategic group was led by Colonel General Oleksandr Syrskyi, who also served concurrently as the Commander of the Ground Forces of the Armed Forces of Ukraine. Since January 2025 the commander was Mykhailo Drapatyi.

== History ==
On August 11, 2022, Colonel General Oleksandr Syrskyi of the Khortytsia Operational Strategic Group of Troops enacted a special exit and entry permit for the Donetsk Oblast. The operational-strategic group participated in the 2022 Kharkiv counteroffensive in the Kharkiv and Luhansk Oblasts in September.

On December 16, 2022, the Office of President Zelenskyy made a press release regarding a meeting with a group of United States military veterans, who handed over equipment and humanitarian aid to the Armed Forces of Ukraine. The president's office stated that the equipment, including vehicles, would be provided to the Tavria operational-strategic group and the Khortytsia operational-strategic group. By January 19, 2023, the operational-strategic group was, according to President Zelenskyy, deployed in the "hottest" part of the front line.

Ukrainian journalist Yurii Butusov said in January 2025 that the Khortytsia group's area of operations covered "the entirety of the main active front" from Kharkiv to Zaporizhzhia. In March 2025, it was reported that the Khortytsia operational-strategic group was responsible for the entire section of the front from the northern part of the Kharkiv region up to the border between the Donetsk region and the Zaporizhzhia region, and that there were several operational-tactical groups under its command.

On August 8, 2025, the Khortytsia operational-strategic group was renamed to "Dnipro".

The operational-strategic group was disbanded at the end of September amid the reorganization of the structure of the Ukrainian military to a corps-based system.

== Commanders ==
- Colonel general Oleksandr Syrskyi (2022–2024)
- Lieutenant general Yurii Sodol (April 2024 – June 24, 2024)
- Major General Andrii Hnatov (June 24, 2024 – January 26, 2025)
- Major general Mykhailo Drapatyi (January 26, 2025 – present)
