= Kurakhove urban hromada =

Kurakhove urban hromada Курахівська міська громада
- Hromada
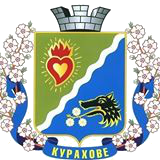
- Coat of arms
- Interactive map of Kurakhove urban hromada
- Country: Ukraine
- Oblast: Donetsk
- Raion: Pokrovsk

Area
  - Total: 351.6 km^{2} (135.8 sq mi)

Population (2020)
  - Total: 38,776
  - Density: 110.3/km^{2} (285.6/sq mi)
- Settlements: 28
- Cities: 2
- Rural settlements: 5
- Villages: 21

Kurakhove urban hromada (Ukrainian: Курахівська міська громада) is a hromada of Ukraine, located in Pokrovsk Raion, Donetsk Oblast. Its administrative center is the city Kurakhove.

It has an area of 351.6 square kilometres (135.8 mi^{2}) and a population of 38,776, as of 2020.

The hromada contains 16 settlements: 2 cities (Kurakhove and Hirnyk), 5 rural settlements (Hostre, Illinka, Kurakhivka, Ostrivske, and Stari Terny), 21 villages:

- Berestki
- Vesely Hai
- Vovchenka
- Voznesenka
- Hannivka
- Hihant
- Dalnye
- Dachne
- Zelenivka
- Zorya
- Izmailivka
- Kostiantynopolske
- Kreminna Balka
- Novodmytrivka
- Novoselydivka
- Sontsivka
- Stepanivka
- Sukhi Yaly
- Trudove
- Uspenivka
- Yantarne

.

== See also ==
- List of hromadas of Ukraine
