= Hirnyk, Donetsk Oblast =

City in Donetsk Oblast, Ukraine

Hirnyk Гірник
- City
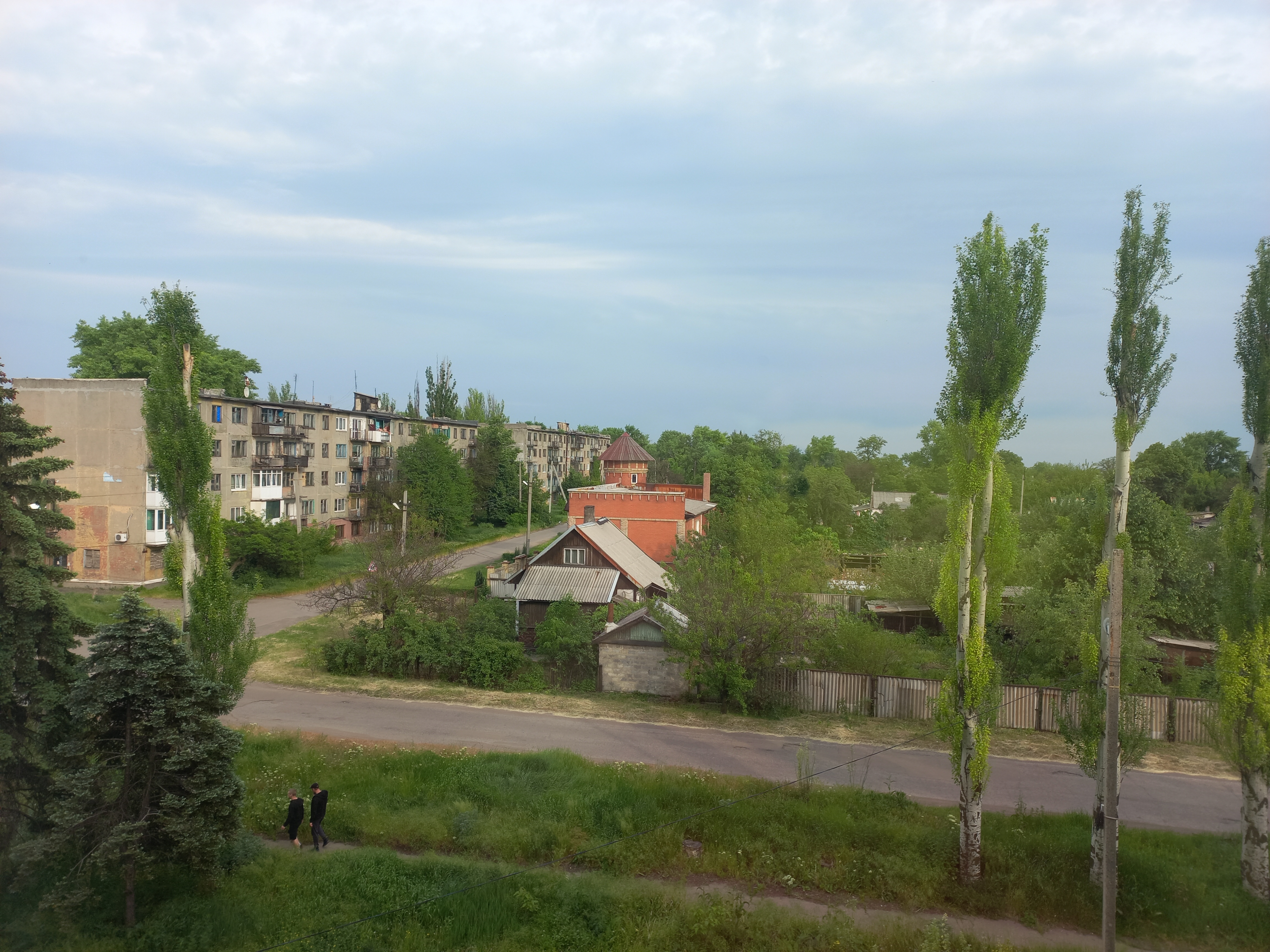
- Interactive map of Hirnyk
- Location within Donetsk Oblast Location within Ukraine
- Coordinates: 48°03′N 37°22′E
- Country: Ukraine
- Oblast: Donetsk Oblast
- Raion: Pokrovsk Raion
- Hromada: Kurakhove urban hromada
- Founded: 1938
- City status: 27 September 1958

Area
  - Total: 5.1 km^{2} (2.0 sq mi)
- Elevation: 195 m (640 ft)

Population (2022)
  - Total: 10,357
  - Density: 2,000/km^{2} (5,300/sq mi)
- Time zone: UTC+2 (EET)
  - Summer (DST): UTC+3 (EEST)
- Postal code: 85487, 85488
- Area code: +380 6237

Hirnyk (Ukrainian: Гірник, pronounced [ɦirˈnɪk]; Russian: Горняк, romanized: Gornyak) is a city in Kurakhove urban hromada, Pokrovsk Raion, Donetsk Oblast (province) of Ukraine. It had a population of approximately 10,357 (2022 estimate). The city has been under Russian occupation since October 2024.

== Geography ==
The city of Hirnyk is situated on the Vovcha River (a left tributary of the Samara River in the Dnieper basin) on the western slope of the Donetsk Ridge, about 15 kilometers southeast of Selydove, to which it is connected by a road. The Tsukurikha train station, located in the village of Tsukuryne, is 7 kilometers away. Hirnyk is located 40 km (25 mi) west of Donetsk.

== History ==
=== 20th century ===
==== Foundation and expansion ====
Hirnyk has its origins in the miner's settlement Sotsmistechko (Note: Ukrainian: Соцмістечко) (sometimes referred to as Sotshorodok (Note: Ukrainian: Соцгородок)), which was founded in 1938 parallel to the construction of coal mines around the city of Kurakhove (Mines No. 40, 42, and 43). These mines were developed as part of the Soviet government's push to expand coal production in the western Donbas to meet the growing energy needs of the state. in March 1938, construction of the mines began, with workers settling nearby. By the end of 1938, the "Donbaszhytlobud" construction firm had built sixty one-storey houses for the miners to lived in. By January 1939, 860 people lived in Sotsmistechko, and coal production started. During 1939, an elementary school, an outpatient clinic, recreational club, and two stores were built in the settlement. Two more mines were under construction, one becoming operational in April 1940. As of summer 1941, the population had grown to 5,000. Coal production steadily increased, and by the time World War II broke out, the mine produced hundreds tons of coal daily.

==== World War II and Nazi Occupation ====
During World War II, as the Axis forces advanced on Sotsmistechko and the threat of occupation by Nazi Germany loomed, much of the male population was drafted for the Soviet war effort. Non-mobilized citizens were evacuated to Karaganda in Kazakhstan, and any industrial equipment that could be moved was taken inland. Anything that could not be taken out was destroyed, and both of the functioning mines were blown up by local communists. The city was captured by Nazi German forces on 20 October 1941, who instituted a repressive and violent occupation, murdering prisoners of war at a hill near Sotsmistechko. The Nazis forced all residents from the age of 14 as well as prisoners of war to begin rebuilding the destroyed mines, but were largely unsuccessful to return either of them to functionality during the occupation, with only small amounts of coal being extracted from the pits. Metals and resources needed for the war effort were forcibly taken.

Small groups of Soviet partisans fought back against the occupation, several of them were killed in a minefield near Rai-Oleksandrivka, Donetsk Oblast. Retreating, the Nazi forces completely destroyed all mines, production buildings and structures, flooded underground workings and burned many residential buildings. Hundreds of Soviet prisoners of war died of hunger and abuse by the Nazis in two camps located in the village and mine. Dozens of sick Nazis were burned alive in the barracks. In On 8 September 1943, Sotsmistechko was recaptured by detachments of the 257th Rifle Division of the Red Army during the broader Soviet counteroffensive in the Donbas.

==== Post-War Reconstruction and Industrial Growth ====
After the end of the war, reconstruction and expansion of the settlement and its mines was prioritised by the Soviet government, with the mines being reinstated by 1944, passing pre-war production levels by 1946. On 30 May 1947, Sotsmistechko was given urban-type settlement status. On 27 September 1958, Sotsmistechko was administratively merged with its neighboring settlements (Prommaidanchyk, Zhovtneve, Peremoha, Pershotravneve, Komsomolske) to create a new city named Hirnyk with a population of 11,000.

In the 1950s and 1960s, Hirnyk's industry expanded with the modernization of coal mining infrastructure, which greatly increased the output to thousands of tons a day. The industry diversified with the construction of a cinder block factory, a construction materials plant, a bread factory, a non-alcoholic drinks factory, and a division of the construction holding "Artemzhytlobud". In 1960, Hirnyk residents erected a monument at the site where the Nazis had murdered Soviet prisoners of war. In 1969, an inter-city station was built in Hirnyk, and the city grew to a population or over 16,000. Numerous state-owned apartment buildings, schools, hospitals and cultural centers were constructed.

=== 21st century ===
==== Russo-Ukrainian War ====
===== War in Donbas =====
In 2014, after the Revolution of Dignity in Ukraine that brought in a more pro-Western government, Russia initiated the war in Donbas, sponsoring pro-Russian militant proxy groups that seized territory in eastern Ukraine. On 29 October 2014, the Security Service of Ukraine detained a group of three militants loyal to the pro-Russian militant organization Donetsk People's Republic (DPR), and seized a militant weapons cache. On 13 February 2015, pro-Russian militants shelled Hirnyk with Grad missiles, killing three civilians. On 30 September 2018, the Hirnyk TV Tower was built in the city, with the purpose of broadcasting Ukrainian television programs to the Russian-occupied parts of Donetsk Oblast. With a height of 190 metres (620 ft), it is the tallest of its kind built since the independence of Ukraine from the Soviet Union in 1991.

On 12 June 2020, as part of Ukraine's 2020 administrative reforms, Hirnyk was assigned to Kurakhove urban hromada, one of the hromadas of Ukraine. On July 18 the same year, Hirnyk, along with the rest of the hromada, became part of an expanded Pokrovsk Raion.

===== Russian invasion of Ukraine =====
On 12 December 2022, during the full-scale Russian invasion of Ukraine, Russia shelled Hirnyk, killing two people and wounding ten others. Ukrainian authorities begun investigating the shelling as a war crime. On 3 January 2024, Russia shelled Hirnyk again, injuring a sixteen-year-old boy.

As claimed by a Ukrainian military officer, most of the remaining residents in Hirnyk are so-called "zhduny", people waiting for and being sympathetic to the Russian Armed Forces, sometimes assisting them. The few hundred residents left reject this label. A great majority of FM frequencies in and near Hirnyk broadcast pro-Russian and Soviet nostalgic content from Donetsk, overpowering Ukrainian TV and FM signals.

In early September 2024, Hirnyk became a frontline city of the war. As part of an offensive effort to capture Pokrovsk, Russian forces neared the outskirts of Hirnyk, Ukrainsk and Selydove, capturing nearby settlements. Some civilians were evacuated. Russian forces were confirmed to have entered the northern part of the city by 26 September. By 20 October, the Russian forces also occupied the north-western portion of the city. Russian sources claimed that the city had been captured on 26 October. On 27 October, the occupation of Hirnyk was confirmed by DeepStateMap.Live.

== Economy ==
The city contains the "Kurakhivska" coal mine, which is owned by the state enterprise "Selydovvuhillia". Additionally, some residents are employed at nearby enterprises, including the Pokrovs'ke coal mine, Pivdennodonbasska Mine (Vuhledar), and the Kurakhivska Central Processing Plant in Kurakhivka. It also used to have another coal mine named "Hirnyk", but that one is now defunct.

The closest train station Tsukurykha is located 7 km (4.3 mi) away from the city. From it through the city railways stretch to the Kurakhove group of mines.

== Demographics ==
Population history

Year	Pop.	±%
1939	860	—
1941	5,000	+481.4%
1958	10,985	+119.7%
1970	14,646	+33.3%
1979	14,745	+0.7%

Year	Pop.	±%
1989	16,203	+9.9%
2001	14,207	−12.3%
2011	11,822	−16.8%
2022	10,357	−12.4%

As of the 2001 Ukrainian census, Hirnyk had a population of 14,207 people, of whom the majority identified as ethnic Ukrainians, while Russians make up a large minority. In terms of religion, there are followers of several denominations, including the Ukrainian Orthodox Church (Moscow Patriarchate), Evangelical Christian Baptists, and the Seventh-day Adventist Church.

Ethnic groups in Hirnyk
	percent
Ukrainians	56.43%
Russians	40.01%
Belarusians	0.95%
Tatars	0.89%
Ukrainian Greeks	0.40%
Moldovans	0.17%
Georgians	0.17%
Azerbaijanis	0.10%
Armenians	0.09%

== Culture ==
Hirnyk's cultural infrastructure includes the Vocational School No. 144, three secondary schools (Nos. 17, 18, and 19), and three kindergartens (Malysh, Ryabinka, and Topolek). The city also has an outpatient clinic, a nursing home, a Palace of Culture, a children's music school, a Palace of Childhood, the Avangard Stadium, and a sports club named after Shvedchenko.

=== Attractions ===
The following attractions and sights are located in the city of Hirnyk: the Holy Cross Church, Avangard Stadium, a children's playground, the Monument to a grieving mother (mass grave), the Monument to the Unknown Soldier (mass grave), City square, the Memorial to fallen miners and the Monument to the liberators of Donbas.

== Gallery ==
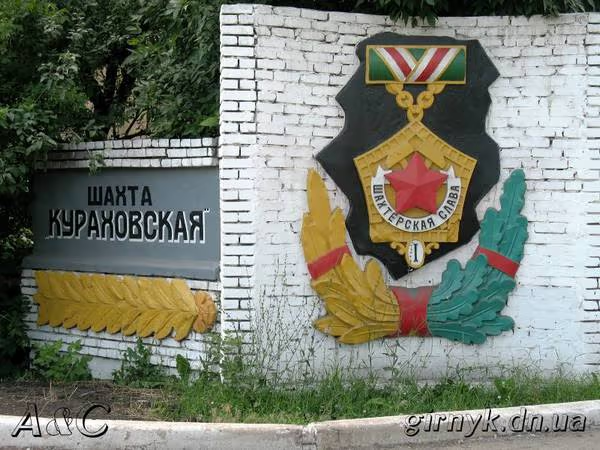
"Kurakhovskaya" mine

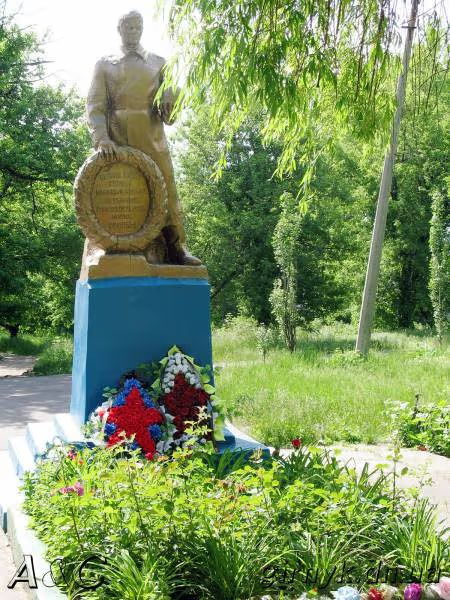
Monument to the Unknown Soldier

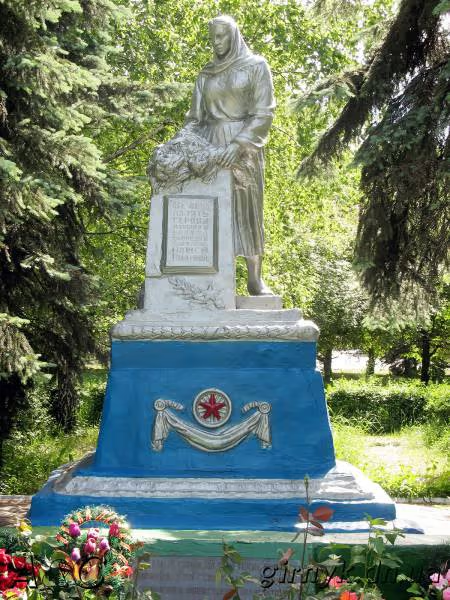
Monument to a grieving mother

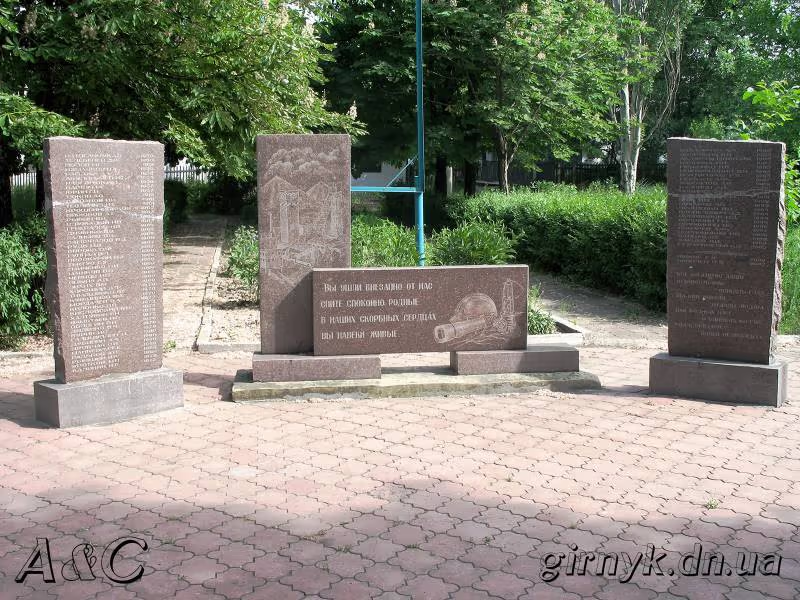
Memorial to the fallen miners

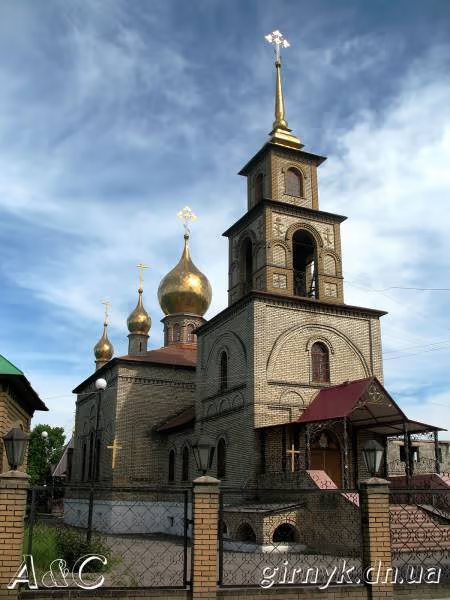
Holy Cross Church

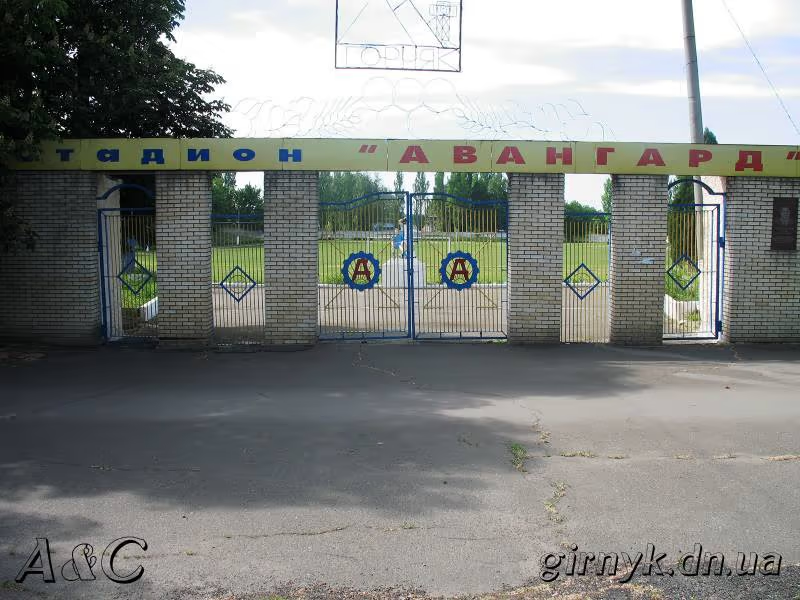
Avangard Stadium

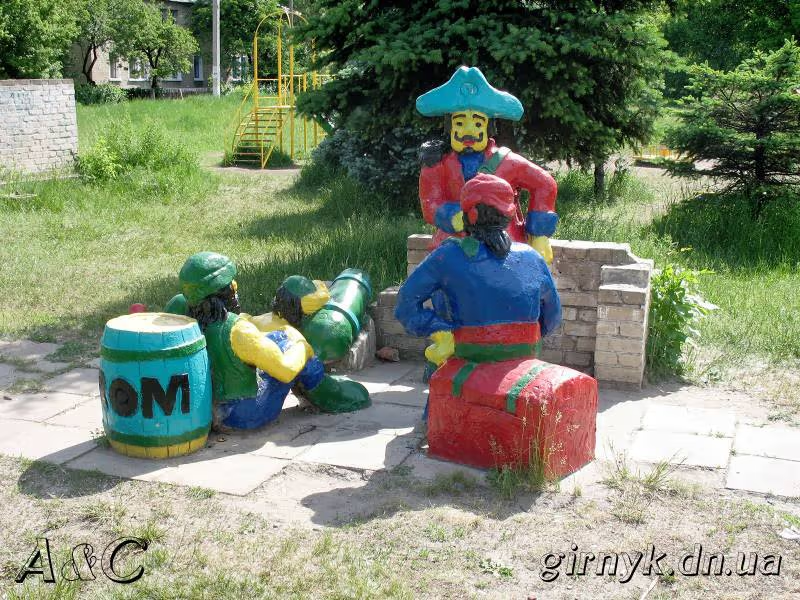
Children's playground

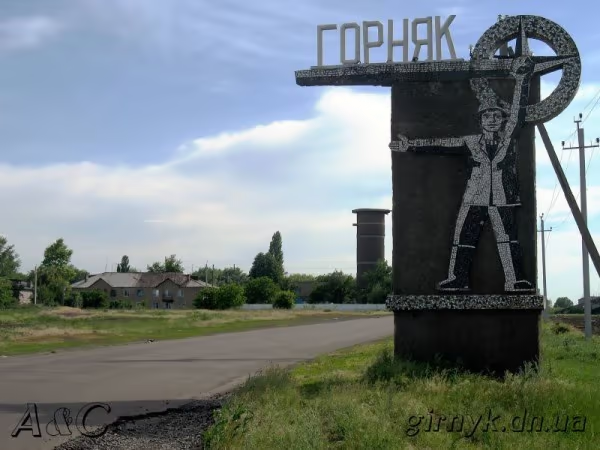
City entrance sign

== Notable people ==
- Denys Kozhanov (born 1987), Ukrainian footballer
- Serhiy Mazur (born 1970), Ukrainian footballer
- Vasyl Mazur (born 1970), Ukrainian footballer
