= Kurakhivka =

Urban locality in Donetsk Oblast, Ukraine

Kurakhivka Курахівка
- Rural settlement
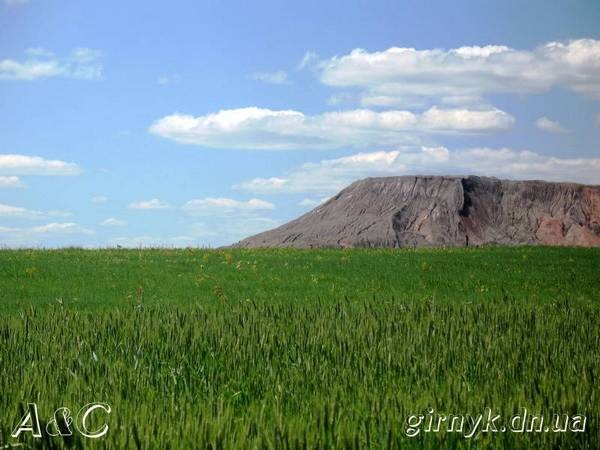
- Interactive map of Kurakhivka
- Location of Kurakhivka Kurakhivka (Ukraine)
- Coordinates: 48°01′40″N 37°22′31″E
- Country: Ukraine
- Oblast: Donetsk Oblast
- Raion: Pokrovsk Raion
- Hromada: Kurakhove urban hromada
- Elevation: 195 m (640 ft)

Population (2022)
  - Total: 2,600
- Time zone: UTC+2
  - Summer (DST): UTC+3
- Postal code: 85490-85492
- Area code: +380 6237

Kurakhivka (Ukrainian: Курахівка) is a rural settlement in Kurakhove urban hromada, Pokrovsk Raion, Donetsk Oblast, eastern Ukraine. The population is 2,600 (2022 estimate). The settlement has been under Russian occupation since October 2024.

== Geography ==
Kurakhivka lies on the left bank of the Kurakhove Reservoir, 19 kilometers southeast of the city of Selydove.

== History ==
Kurakhivka was founded in the west of the Donetsk region in 1924.

Due to its proximity and economic connection, Hirnyk influenced the settlements' history.

During the Russian invasion of Ukraine, fighting began in proximity of the village in October 2024, as Russians advanced in the direction of Kurakhove as part of a new offensive effort. Russian forces entered the settlement in late October, and were confirmed to have captured it on 31 October.

== Economy ==
The village is home to DTEK's central processing plant ("Kurakhivska Central Processing Plant"), which makes use of the local railway.

Two mines are located near the village: Mine No. 10, which is now closed, and Mine No. 42 “Kurakhivska,” operated by SE “Selidovugol.” The latter remains active, providing employment not only to the residents of Kurakhivka but also to those from Tsukuryne and the city of Hirnyk. Additionally, the village hosts a bus depot (ATP), the Donetsk-Kurakhove Metallurgical Plant (DKMZ), which specializes in smelting non-ferrous metals, and a food distribution base supplying products across much of Ukraine.

While some of the village's population works at local enterprises, such as those in Kurakhovka, others are employed at larger facilities in nearby cities, including the Pokrovsk and Vuhledar mines.

Within the village, the Kurakhove railway station operates exclusively for freight services, primarily serving the Kurakhivska Central Processing Plant, following the discontinuation of the last local commuter train.

== Demographics ==
Native language as of the Ukrainian Census of 2001:

- Ukrainian 30.56%
- Russian 69.05%
- Armenian 0.17%
- Belarusian 0.07%
- Moldovan (Romanian) 0.05%
- Hungarian and Greek 0.02%

== Culture ==
In Kurakhivka, the social infrastructure includes a comprehensive school (School No. 22), the "Yasnaya Polyana" kindergarten, an outpatient clinic, and a "House of Culture". The village is also well-served by a variety of shops, both for groceries and manufactured goods, as well as several cafes.

=== Attractions ===
The city features several landmarks, including a monument to fallen soldiers, a monument to deceased miners, a church and the House of Culture.

=== Gallery ===
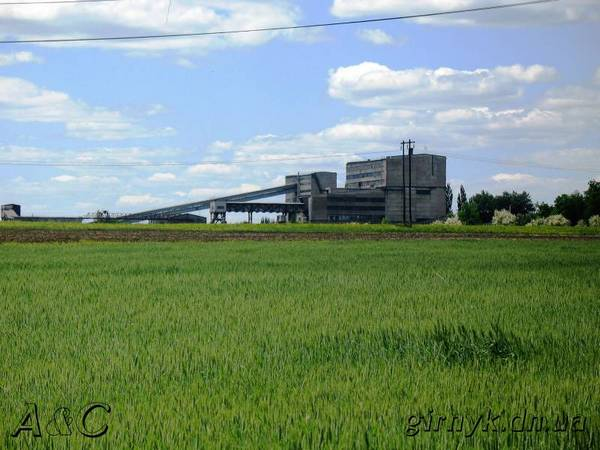
DTEK's Central Processing Plant

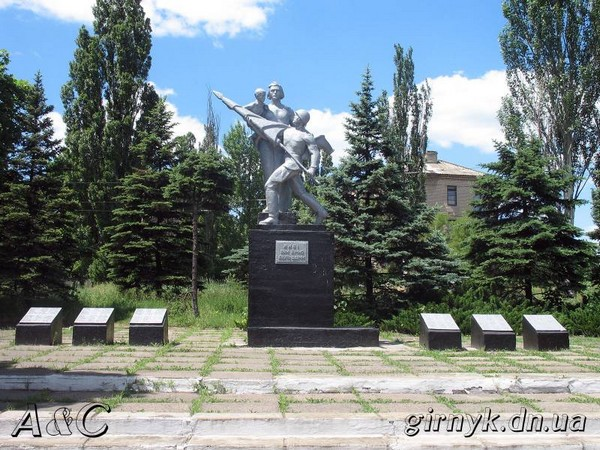
Monument to the fallen soldiers

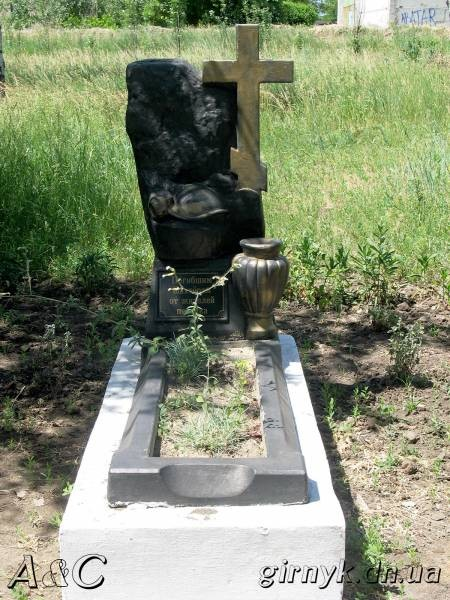
Monument to the dead miners

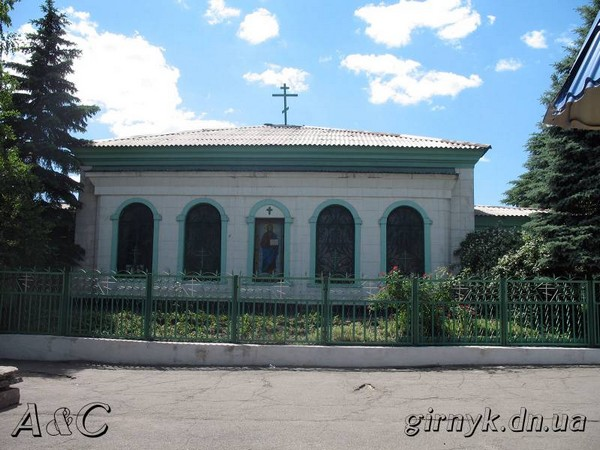
Church of the village

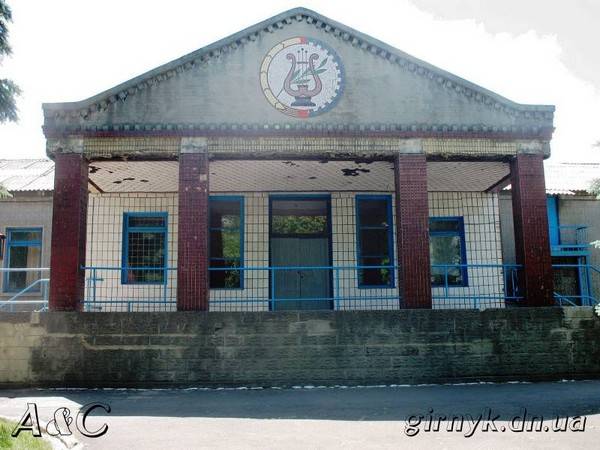
House of Culture

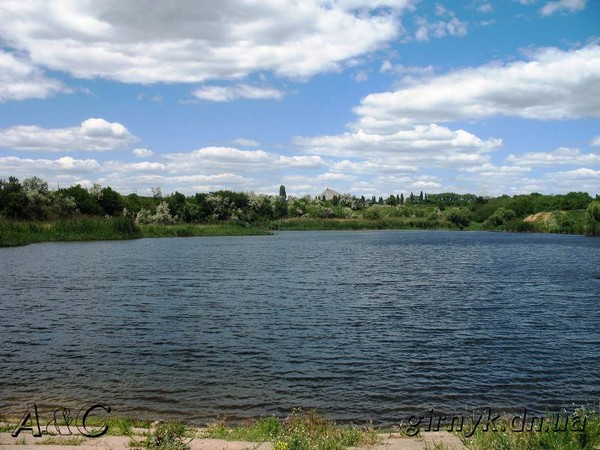
Lake near Kurakhivka
