= Novooleksiivka, Donetsk Oblast =

Village in Donetsk Oblast

Novooleksiivka Новоолексіївка
- Village
- Novooleksiivka shown within Ukraine Novooleksiivka shown within Donetsk
- Coordinates: 48°8′8″N 37°12′20″E
- Country: Ukraine
- Oblast: Donetsk Oblast
- Raion: Pokrovsk Raion
- Hromada: Selydove urban hromada
- Elevation: 186 m (610 ft)

Population (2001)
  - Total: 177
- Postal code: 85364
- Area code: +380 623

Novooleksiivka (Ukrainian: Новоолексіївка; Russian: Новоалексеевка) is a village in Donetsk oblast, Ukraine.

On 7 November 2024 it was captured by Russian troops as part of the Russian invasion of Ukraine, as confirmed by DeepStateMap.
