= Tsukuryne =

Urban locality in Donetsk Oblast, Ukraine

Tsukuryne Цукурине
- Rural settlement
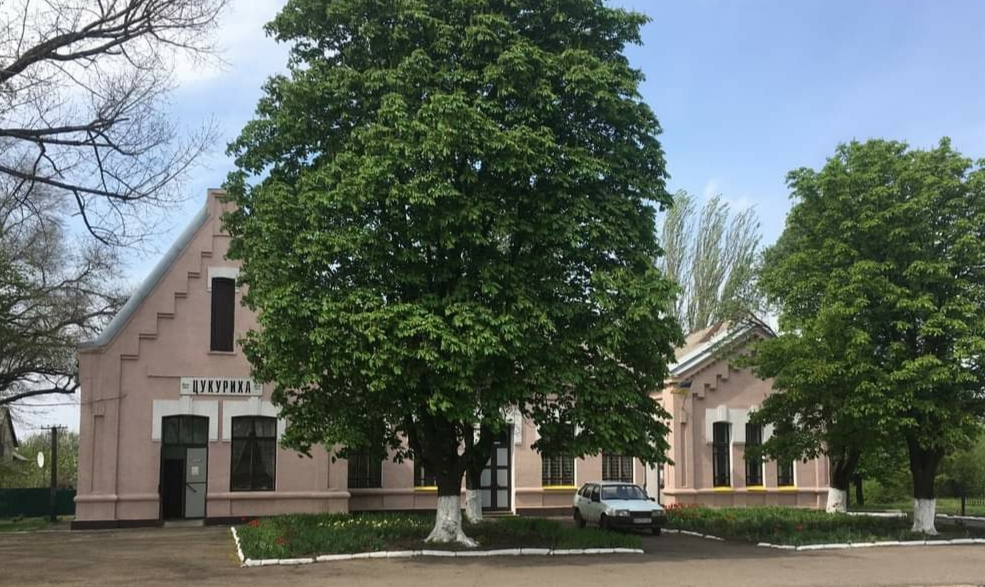
- Tsukuryne railway station.
- Interactive map of Tsukuryne
- Location of Tsukuryne Tsukuryne (Ukraine)
- Coordinates: 48°05′04″N 37°18′34″E
- Country: Ukraine
- Oblast: Donetsk Oblast
- Raion: Pokrovsk Raion
- Elevation: 198 m (650 ft)

Population (2022)
  - Total: 1,745
- Time zone: UTC+2
  - Summer (DST): UTC+3
- Postal code: 85486
- Area code: +380 6237

Tsukuryne (Ukrainian: Цукурине) is a rural settlement in Pokrovsk Raion, Donetsk Oblast, eastern Ukraine. The population is 1,745 (2022 estimate). The settlement has been under Russian occupation since October 2024.

== Geography ==
Tsukuryne is situated at the crossroads of routes connecting it to nearly all neighboring towns. It is 8 km northwest of the city of Selydove, 3 km southeast of the city of Hirnyk, and 2 km east of the city of Ukrainsk.

== History ==
=== Founding and expansion ===
The village of "Podzemgaz" (Russian: "Подземгаз") was established as a railway settlement near the Tsukurikha train station that was built in 1916 and opened in 1917 by the Russian Empire's Railway Ministry, as a part of the Rudnykovo-Lozivska railway. The village station became a key junction for both cargo and passenger traffic, connected to the "Kurakhivska" mines. Initially built to facilitate freight movement, it saw the opening of regular passenger services in 1917.

After the Russian Civil War, In the early Soviet period, the village handled increasing freight traffic, transferring coal and other goods from the nearby mines. In the 1920s, it also supported nearby factories, transporting agricultural machinery. By the late 1920s, the village station managed thousands of tons of freight annually. Passenger traffic to Kurakhivka began around 1930, initially using a rigid passenger car attached to a cargo train.

During World War II, the station played a role in supporting the Soviet war effort, ensuring coal and other vital supplies were transported to industrial and military zones. After the war, Tsukurikha continued coal transportation and passenger services. Regular passenger services to Kurakhivka resumed in the mid-1940s as working trains, and by the 1960s, these were converted into suburban trains running between Krasnoarmiysk (now Pokrovsk) and Kurakhivka, with two daily trips.

In 1956, the Hydraulic Mine No. 105 was established near the train station. The village received the status of an urban locality under the name "Tsukuryne" in 1965. In 1970, the local mine was connected to Mine No. 42 "Kurakhivska" along with the enrichment plant. By the 1980s, diesel trains linked Tsukuryne to Donetsk city. Freight traffic remained stable throughout the Soviet era, bolstered by nearby mines. Up to the 1990s, during the peak years of the station, up to 10 commuter trains ran daily.

=== 21st century and Russo-Ukrainian War ===
After the Mine No. 105 ceased operations in 1993, the traffic at the station has remained stable, supported by the steady volume of coal and freight passing through the Kurakhiv branch. The last commuter train through the station to Kurakhivka ran in 2009, being replaced by buses for railway workers. Passenger traffic on the main route between Rutchenkove—Krasnoarmiysk ended in 2014.

On 17 July 2020, the settlement became part of the newly established Selydove urban hromada in an expanded Pokrovsk Raion. Until then, the settlement council community of Tsukuryne (Tsukuryne village council) was part of the City Council Community of Selydove under the administration of the oblast, located in the southern part of the surrounding Pokrovsk Raion.

During the Russo-Ukrainian War and the Russian invasion of Ukraine, Tsukuryne became an embattled frontline settlement in late September 2024, along the nearby cities of Hirnyk, Selydove and Ukrainsk. Russian forces then entered the southern parts in early October, fully capturing it on 6 October 2024, which the Russian Ministry of Defense formally announced on 28 October.

== Economy ==
The village of Tsukuryne is divided by a railway line into the nearly equal western and eastern part, where the Tsukurikha freight station is located. Although the private sector predominates, there are also two-story brick houses.

Most residents work at "CEP No. 105," the German-Ukrainian joint venture "Minova Ukraine," or coal enterprises in nearby towns, including mines like "Ukraine" (Ukrainsk), "Kurakhovskaya" (Selidovugol), the Kurakhivka central processing plant, "Pokrovskoye" mine, "Yuzhnodonbasskaya" mine (Vuhledar), and others.

Minova Ukraine LLC, based on the German Minova CarboTech GmbH, is part of the global leader Minova International LTD (UK), specializing in innovative mining technologies for safer and more efficient work.

== Demographics ==
Native language as of the Ukrainian Census of 2001:

- Ukrainian 33.58%
- Russian 65.63%
- Belarusian 0.21%
- Moldovan (Romanian) and German 0.04%

== Culture ==
The village has a secondary school and a kindergarten as part of its social infrastructure.

Sights of the city include the Tsukurikha train station, a House of Culture and the monument to the fallen soldiers.

== Gallery ==
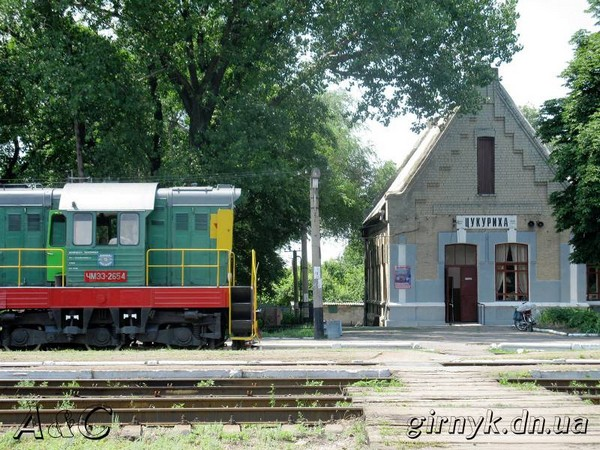
Tsukurikha train station

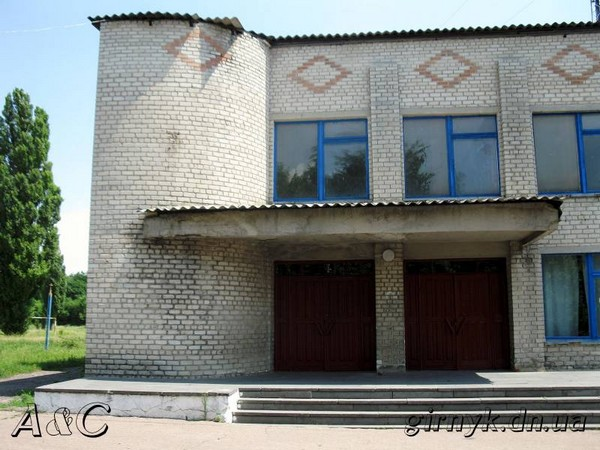
House of Culture in Tsukuryne

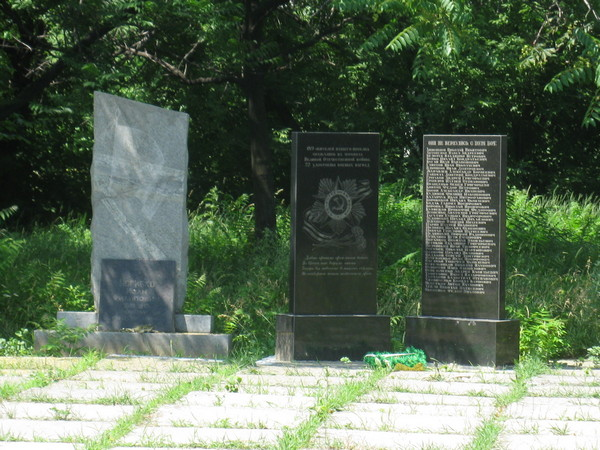
Monument to fallen soldiers
