= Selydove urban hromada =

Selydove urban hromada Селидівська міська громада
- Hromada
- Interactive map of Selydove urban hromada
- Country: Ukraine
- Oblast: Donetsk
- Raion: Pokrovsk

Area
  - Total: 150.2 km^{2} (58.0 sq mi)

Population (2020)
  - Total: 35,403
  - Density: 235.7/km^{2} (610.5/sq mi)
- Settlements: 9
- Cities: 2
- Rural settlements: 2
- Villages: 5

Selydove urban hromada (Ukrainian: Селидівська міська громада) is a hromada of Ukraine, located in Pokrovsk Raion, Donetsk Oblast. Its administrative center is the city Selydove.

It has an area of 150.2 square kilometres (58.0 mi^{2}) and a population of 35,403, as of 2020.

The hromada contains 9 settlements: 2 cities (Selydove and Ukrainsk), 2 rural settlements (Vyshneve and Tsukuryne), and 5 villages:

- Hryhorivka
- Novooleksiiivka
- Petrivka
- Pustinka
- Yuryivka

== See also ==
- List of hromadas of Ukraine
