= Eduard Prutnik =

Ukrainian businessman and philanthropist

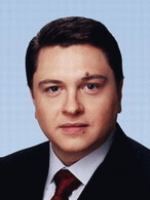
Прутнік Едуард Анатолійович

Eduard Anatoliyovych Prutnik (Ukrainian: Едуа́рд Анато́лійович Пру́тнік, romanized: Prutnik Eduard Anatoliiovych; born 15 January 1973) is a Ukrainian businessman and philanthropist. Chairman of the board of directors of the United World International Foundation.

== Biography ==
Eduard Prutnik was born on 15 January 1973 in the town of Selydove in the Donetsk region. He is married to Oksana Prutnik, and has two sons (Kyrylo and Danylo) and a daughter (Maria). He attended Donetsk National University and graduated as Candidate of Sciences in economics. His business interests include banking, media and mining companies. In 2008, his net worth was estimated at $360 million.

== Public activities ==
Prutnik is chairman of the board of the United World International Foundation, which he created in April 2008. The foundation aims to raise Ukrainians' awareness of their national identity (and its importance to their community and the world) and secure their rights and opportunities in the global society.

United World International Fund – international humanitarian fund created by Eduard Prutnik. It is politically independent structure.

In March 2006, Eduard Prutnik was elected a People's Deputy of Ukraine from the Party of Regions. At the time of his election, Prutnik was chairman of the board of the non-governmental organization Sotsium, a member of the Party of Regions, head of the Subcommittee for Legal Support of Economic, Anthropogenic and Environmental Safety of the Committee for National Security and Defence of Ukraine (July–October 2006) and a member of the Party of Regions in the Ukrainian Parliament (May–October 2006).

Prutnik was re-elected to the Ukrainian Parliament from the Party of Regions at the single-seat national constituency as 55th in the list of candidates. At that time, Prutnik was chairman of the State Committee for Television and Radio Broadcasting of Ukraine, a member of the Party of Regions, a member of the Committee on Freedom of Speech and Information of the Verkhovna Rada of Ukraine (26 December 2007 – 13 April 2010) and a member of the Verkhovna Rada Committee on Fuel and Energy Complex, Nuclear Policy and Nuclear Safety (since 23 February 2012). He was elected head of the Verkhovna Rada Interim Committee of Inquiry for the investigation of interference by government and local authorities and their officials to the media and reports on freedom-of-speech violations in the media (18 December 2009 – 30 March 2010). Prutnik is a member of the Groups for Inter-Parliamentary Liaison with the United States and France.

During his term as the People's Deputy of the sixth session of the Verkhovna Rada, Prutnik submitted the top number of inquiries among all People's Deputies. His membership in the Party of Regions was awarded by a decision of the political council of Constituency 217 of the Chernihiv Region. To ensure consideration of voter issues, Prutnik has opened four community liaison offices.
