= Ukrainsk =

City in Donetsk Oblast, Ukraine

Ukrainsk Українськ
- City
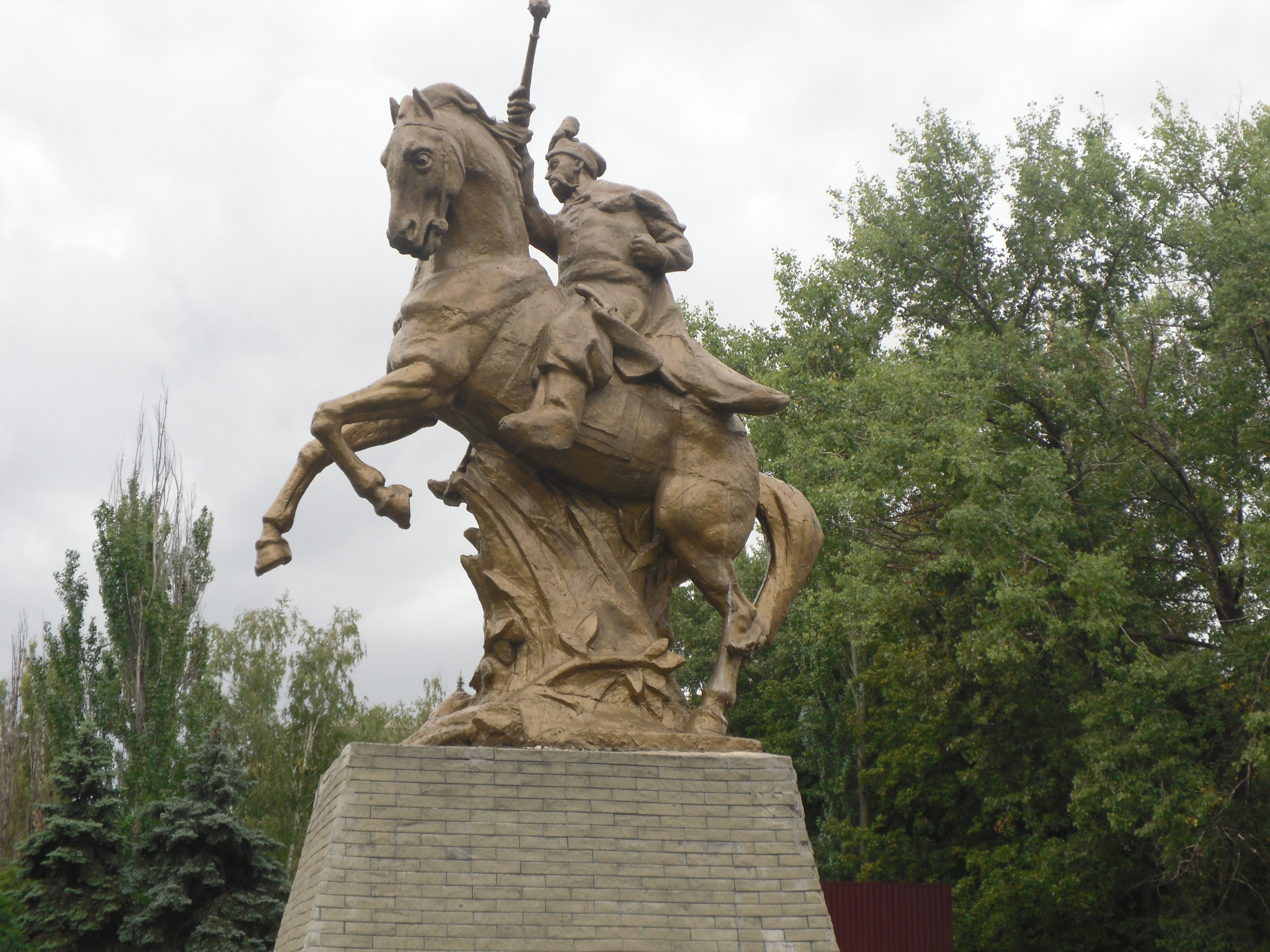

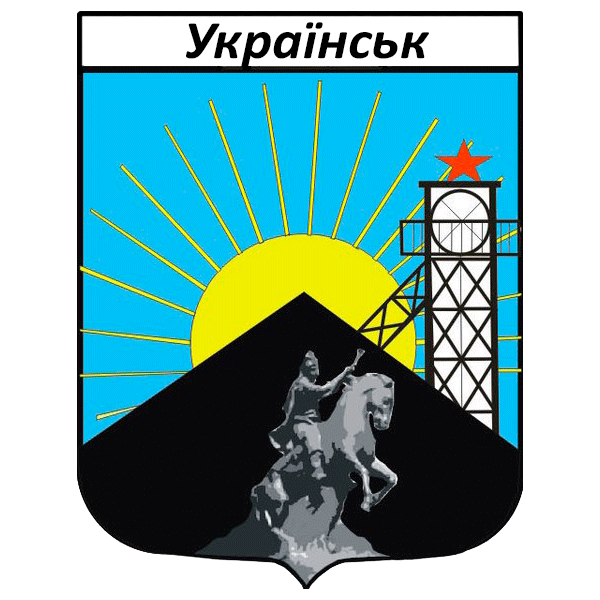
- Seal
- Interactive map of Ukrainsk
- Location within Ukraine Location within Donetsk Oblast
- Coordinates: 48°06′N 37°23′E
- Country: Ukraine
- Oblast: Donetsk Oblast
- Raion: Pokrovsk Raion
- Hromada: Selydove urban hromada
- Founded: 1952
- City status: 1963

Area
  - Total: 4.2 km^{2} (1.6 sq mi)
- Elevation: 210 m (690 ft)

Population (2022)
  - Total: 10,655
  - Density: 2,500/km^{2} (6,600/sq mi)
- Time zone: UTC+2 (EET)
  - Summer (DST): UTC+3 (EEST)
- Postal code: 85485
- Area Code: +380 6236
- Climate: Dfb

Ukrainsk (Ukrainian: Українськ, [ʊkrɐˈjinʲsʲk]; Russian: Украинск, [ʊkrɐˈinsk]) is a city in Selydove urban hromada, Pokrovsk Raion, Donetsk Oblast, Ukraine. The population was estimated at 10,655 in 2022, which went down from 13,236 in 2001. The city has been under Russian occupation since September 2024.

== Geography ==
The city of Ukrainsk is located 11 km from the town of Selydove, not far from the international M04 (E50) motorway, and 4 km from the Tsukuryne railway station, from which one can get to the towns of Kurakhove, Donetsk, Selydove and Pokrovsk.

== History ==
=== Founding and expansion ===
In 1952, geologists discovered large deposits of coking coal in proximity to the area of the later settlement. Following that, the settlement "Lisivka" was founded in connection with the construction of the "Lisivka" or later "Ukraina" ("Ukraine") coal mine), to exploit the newly discovered resources. It was followed by the construction of the Selydivska-Pivdenna coal mine.

At the same time, residential construction was also underway. In 1957, elections to the village council were held, and a territorial party organisation was established. In January 1962, the construction of the Selydivska-Pivdenna mine was completed, and a year later, the "Ukraina" mine was completed. A enrichment plant and a motor depot were constructed.

The village of Lisivska and Selydivska-Pivdenna mines were granted the status of urban-type settlements on 20 December 1957. In 1963, Lisivka received the status of a city and a new name Ukrainsk derived from the name of the "Ukraina" mine.

To accommodate newly arriving children of the workers, four schools were established. In 1967, a music school was also opened. More than a thousand children are brought up in eight kindergartens and nurseries. Additionally, a widescreen cinema "Ogonyk", a summer cinema, the club of the mine "Ukraina", and two libraries appeared.

The town has been extensively improved: from 1964 to 1969, 45 multi-story residential buildings were constructed, and the town was well landscaped. 13 shops, a home kitchen, and four canteens, two hospitals, an outpatient clinic, and two pharmacies were built. Near the town, in Tsukrova Balka, a night sanatorium for the "Ukraina" mine was established.

=== 2002 fire at Ukraina mine ===
On July 7, 2002, a fire occurred at the Ukraina coal mine at a depth of 670 meters. The Ukraina coal mine is part of the state holding company Selydovvuhillia. At that time, some 114 miners were at the mine's face. Only 81 of them were rescued, while others perished.

=== 21st century and Russo-Ukrainian War ===
On 12 June 2020, according to the order of the Cabinet of Ministers of Ukraine No. 710-r ‘On determining the administrative centres and approval of territories of territorial communities of Donetsk region’, the city became part of the Selydove urban hromada.

On 17 July 2020, as a result of the administrative-territorial reform, in accordance with the Resolution of the Verkhovna Rada of Ukraine No. 807-IX, the Selydove urban hromada became part of the newly formed Pokrovsk Raion of the Donetsk Oblast.

During the Russian invasion of Ukraine, Ukrainsk became a frontline city of the war.

In late August 2024, as part of an offensive effort to capture the strategic city of Pokrovsk, Russian forces advanced south of Pokrovsk, nearing the outskirts of Ukrainsk and Selydove, capturing nearby settlements. In early September, Russian forces reportedly entered the city. In mid September, the Russian forces captured large parts of the eastern and southern parts of the city. Russian state-run RIA news agency and pro-Russian milbloggers stated that the city was captured on 17 September, which was corroborated by geolocated footage.

== Demographics ==
At the 2001 Ukrainian census, the population was 13,236, of which the native language and ethnic distribution was:

Ethnicity

- Ukrainians: 48.38%
- Russians: 48.24%
- Belarusians: 1.32%
- Tatars: 0.37%

Native language

- Russian: 76.40%
- Ukrainian: 23.08%
- Belarusian: 0.20%

== Economy ==
The city of Ukrainsk relies heavily on the mining industry, particularly through the "Ukraine" coal mine and the coal processing plant (CPF "Ukraine"), both managed by the State Enterprise "Selydovvuhillia." Most of the city's residents are employed in the mine.

In 2008–2009, on the initiatives of the city mayor's office announced in the mass media, about 700 families from various regions of Ukraine moved to Ukrainsk. No more than 10% of the working population works at the "Ukraine" mine. The city has an asphalt plant, a bakery, several sewing workshops, and small car repair companies.

== Culture ==
Ukrainsk offers a range of community services, including secondary schools, kindergartens, a clinic, and a stadium. Children in the city have various opportunities to develop their talents, particularly at the House of Creativity.

The city is home to several educational and cultural institutions. These include a music school named after V.G. Kuprienko, two physical education and sports institutions, one extracurricular educational center, and one healthcare facility. Notably, Vitaly Neshin and Rinat Akhmetov once honed their boxing skills here, representing "Spartak" in numerous tournaments. In 1999–2000, a local football team Shakhta Ukraina Ukrainsk competed at national level and later the UEFA Regions' Cup.

Among the schools are the "Children's and Youth Sports School" (DYSSh) of the "Ukraine" mine, named after ZMS V. V. Miroshnichenko, two preschool institutions—primary school No. 22 "Svitlyachok" and secondary school No. 18 "Kosmos"—as well as two secondary schools: secondary school No. 12 and secondary school No. 13.

=== Attractions ===
The main attractions of the town are the following localities: the central square of the city; the mine "Ukraine"; a memorial sign in honor of the labor achievements of section No. 1 of the Ukraine mine; the city road sign at the entrance to Ukrainsk, the stadium "Ukraine" and the former cinema.

Other sites include:

- the monument to Bohdan Khmelnytsky (Oktyabrska street)
- stele of miner's glory (Komsomolska street)
- 2 commemorative signs near the SE "Shakhta" and SE "Selydovvuhillia"

== Gallery ==
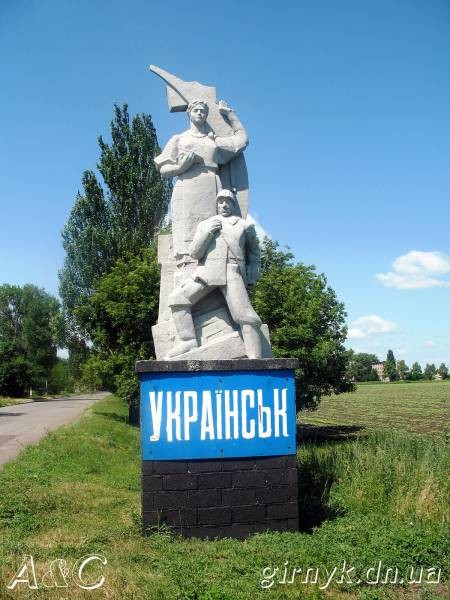
Stele "Miner's Glory" at the entrance to the city, dedicated to the mine "Ukraine"

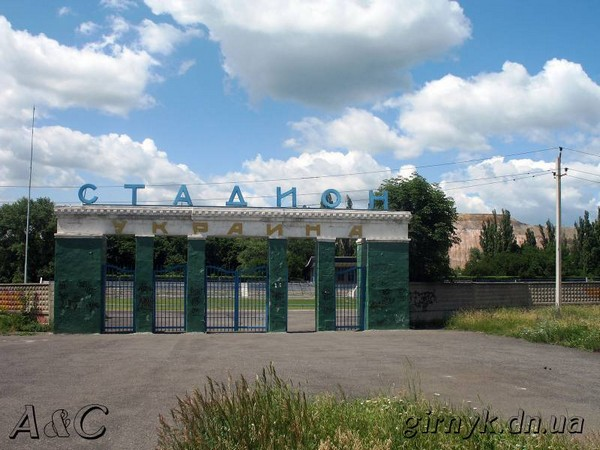
Stadium of Ukrainsk

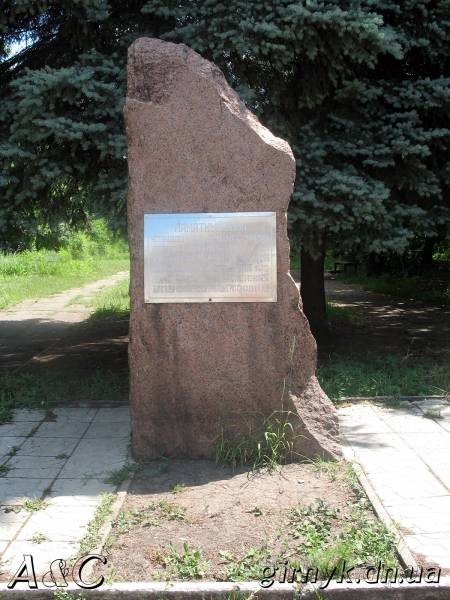
Memorial plate for the section No. 1 of the "Ukraine" mine

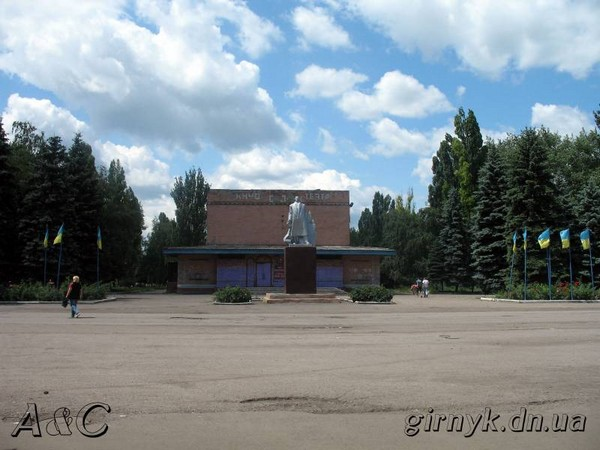
Central square of Ukrainsk

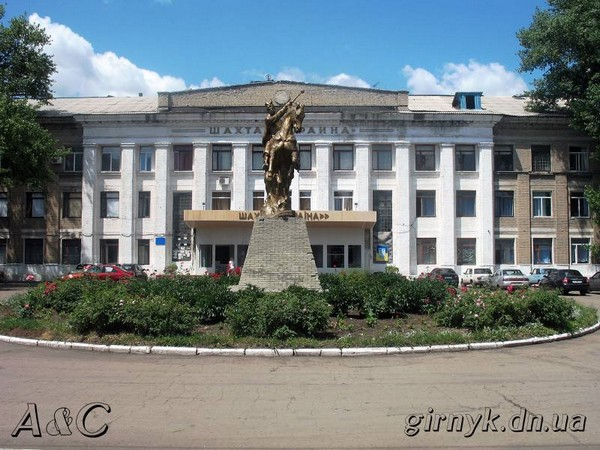
Administrative office of the "Ukraine" mine

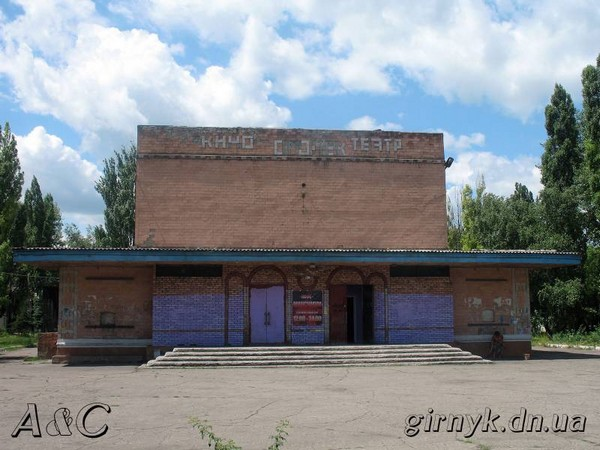
Former cinema of Ukrainsk
