= Selydove =

City in Donetsk Oblast, Ukraine

Selydove Селидове
- City
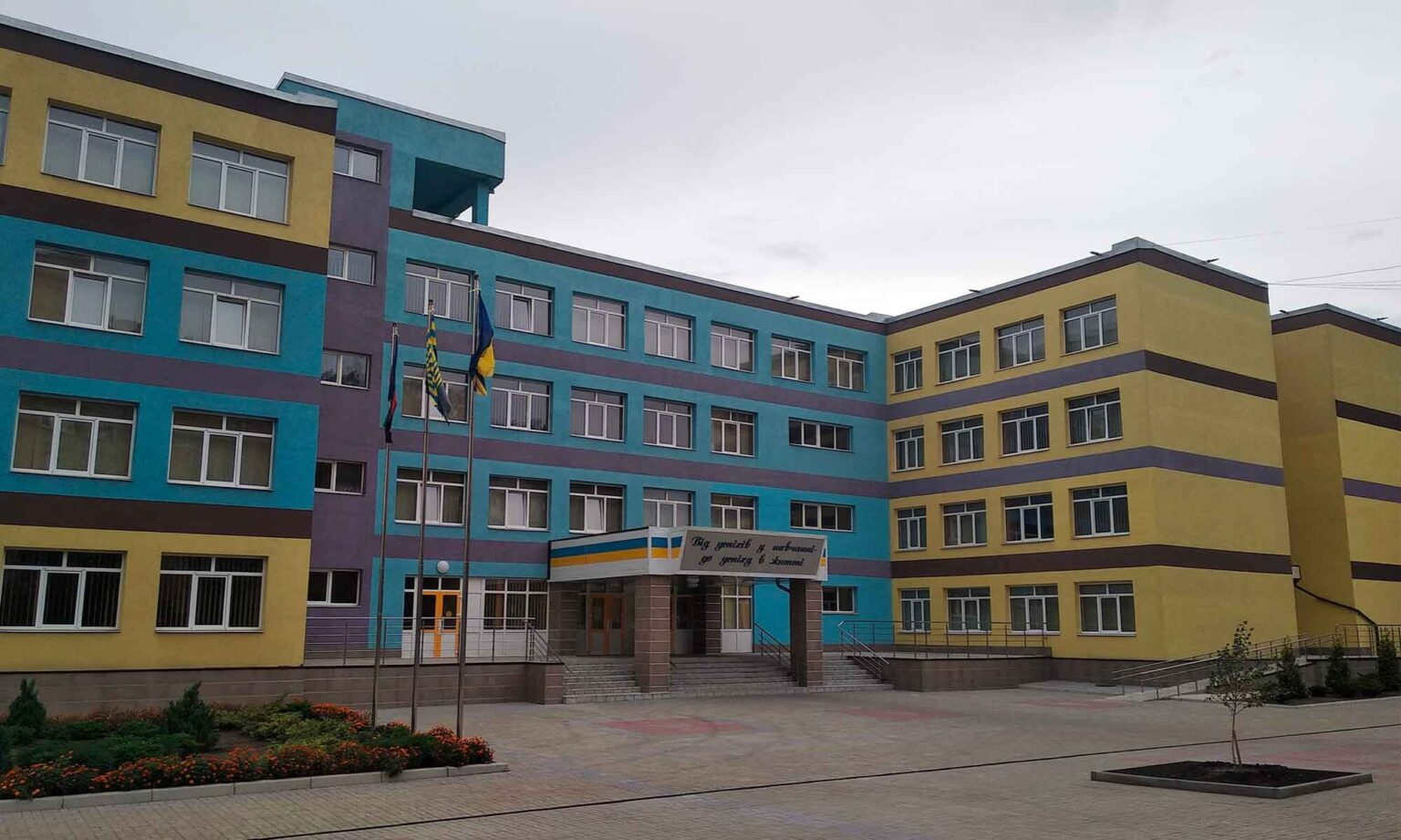
- School No. 6

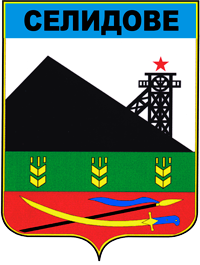
- Flag Coat of arms
- Interactive map of Selydove
- Location within Donetsk Oblast Location within Ukraine
- Coordinates: 48°9′N 37°18′E
- Country: Ukraine
- Oblast: Donetsk Oblast
- Raion: Pokrovsk Raion
- Hromada: Selydove urban hromada
- Founded: 1770–1773
- City status: 1962
- Area: 11.4 km^{2} (4.4 sq mi)
- Elevation: 157 m (515 ft)
- Population (2022): 21,521
  - Density: 1,890/km^{2} (4,890/sq mi)
- Time zone: UTC+2 (EET)
  - Summer (DST): UTC+3 (EEST)
- Postal code: 85400-85480
- Area Code: +380 6237
- Climate: Dfb

Selydove (Ukrainian: Селидове, pronounced [seˈlɪdowe]; Russian: Селидово, romanized: Selidovo), formerly Selydivka (Селидівка; Селидовка, Selidovka), is a city in Pokrovsk Raion, Donetsk Oblast, in eastern Ukraine. The city is located in the western part of the region, on the Solona River (a tributary of the Vovcha, Dnieper basin). It is the administrative center of Selydove urban hromada. Its population was approximately 21,521 (2022 estimate). The city has been under Russian occupation since October 2024.

== History ==
=== Early settlement and foundation ===
The area where Selydove now stands was historically home to various nomadic tribes, including the Avars, Goths, Huns, Pechenegs, and later the Mongol-Tatars and Nogai Tatars. These groups roamed the steppes for centuries, often displacing one another.

Intensive settlement of the area began in the second half of the 18th century following the Russo-Turkish wars, which ended Ottoman and Crimean Khanate control over the northern Black Sea region. The Tsarist Russian Empire distributed land in the newly acquired territories to nobles and settlers, from other regions and various European countries.

According to legend, Zaporozhia Cossacks who were moving from Zaporizhia to Kuban had a cart break down while crossing the Solona river. Since it was difficult to quickly find wood in the steppe, and it was already late autumn, they decided to winter in this place, and then stayed altogether. The Otaman of the group was called "Selyd", and the settlement was named after him. Another version, according to the legends of old residents, is that once upon a time the government land surveyor was offered fat for his work, but he did not like such payment, he did not accept it. That's when he named the village "Salodavka" ("to give lard"). This legend explains the name of the settlement until 1956 – Selydivka.

The city was founded between 1770 and 1773, when Moldovan and Wallachian settlers that occupied the banks of the Solona River were resettled, making way for the "Greek Cossacks", i.e. the settled part of the Zaporozhians, the Myrhorod Regiment, but also peasants fleeing serfdom from regions such as Chernihiv and Kharkiv. By 1782, the Bakhmut Provincial Chancellery officially established a state military settlement named Selydivka near the sources of the Vovcha subsidiary Solona River, near the Palievsky Ravine.

By 1797, Selydivka had grown into a thriving settlement with 927 inhabitants, predominantly Ukrainians. The state peasants of Selydivka were primarily engaged in farming and cattle breeding. During this period, the Russian government was actively settling, developing and russifying the southern steppes, offering land grants and various incentives to settlers, including tax exemptions and monetary loans. Despite these incentives, the settlement faced challenges, including heavy taxation and feudal obligations, which led to the concentration of land and wealth in the hands of a few local elites.

Nearby Selydivka, more than a dozen settlements were established, including many German ones.

=== Developments in the 19th century ===
The 19th century was a period of significant growth and change for Selydivka. In 1799, the Church of St. Nicholas was built, marking the establishment of religious institutions in the settlement. By 1865, Selydivka had become the administrative center of a parish, housing both the parish administration and court. The opening of the first school in 1872 signaled the beginning of formal education in the village.

Throughout the late 19th century, Selydivka developed into a modestly prosperous community. Before World War I, the village had expanded to include three schools, a parish school, a village pharmacy, a reception center, a dispensary, a post office, a brick factory, a coal mine, a pottery, mills, and other small industries. The population of the village grew rapidly, partly due to natural increase and partly due to the influx of peasants fleeing feudal oppression in other parts of Ukraine.

However, this period also saw the beginning of economic stratification, as wealthier peasants (kulaks) began to accumulate land and resources, while poorer peasants struggled with increasing taxes and declining land availability. By the end of the 19th century, the average size of landholdings in Selydivka had decreased significantly, leading to widespread indebtedness and the sale of land by impoverished peasants.

=== Early 20th century and Soviet era ===
The early 20th century brought further industrial development to Selydivka, with the establishment of small coal mines and other enterprises. However, the village's economy remained primarily agrarian, and many residents continued to struggle with land scarcity, poverty, starvation and illiteracy. The situation worsened with the onset of World War I and the subsequent Russian Revolution.

In the summer of 1914, many residents of Selydivka were conscripted to fight in World War I, and 383 villagers from the Selydivka volost died by 1917. Due to continued dissatisfaction with the Imperial government, several villagers and farmers of Selydivka endorsed socialist-revolutionary efforts and participated in armed uprisings against the authorities, forming a provisional government for the region.

In late April 1918, Selydivka was occupied by Austro-German forces, accompanied by the formation of the Ukrainian State. Local kulaks and former royal officials took advantage of the situation, rising to power. Backed by the occupiers and the Hetmans, the kulaks oppressed partisan activity and those who resisted serving them. With the withdrawal of the Central Powers, the city became embroiled in fighting between Bolsheviks and the White Guard.

In 1919, following the Ukrainian War of Independence, communist Soviet rule was established in Selydivka. The village became a district center in 1923, and the new Soviet government initiated several projects aimed at improving local infrastructure and industry. This period saw the construction of the Palace of Labor in 1927, a country club in 1930, and a district hospital between 1932 and 1934.

From 1932 to 1933, citizens in the region were greatly affected by the Holodomor and the Russification policy of Joseph Stalin against Ukrainian culture. As most ethnic Ukrainians were rural peasant farmers, they bore the brunt of the artificial famine.

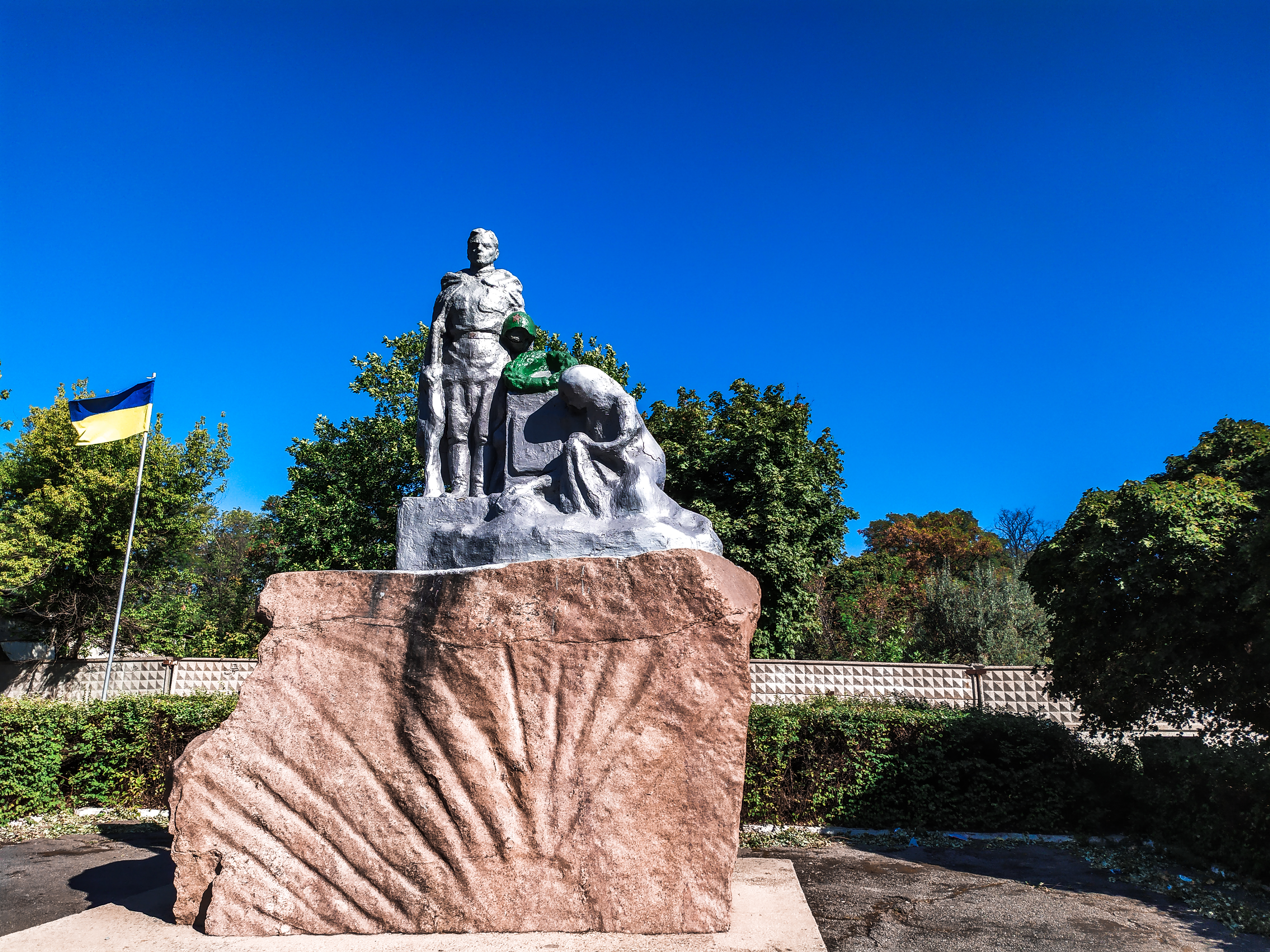
Mass grave of soldiers killed in WW2

During World War II, Selydivka was occupied by Nazi-German forces from October 20, 1941, to September 8, 1943, when it was re-taken by the Soviets. All village residents aged 14 and older were forced into compulsory labor, working from sunrise to sunset in fields and on military road construction. With the help of local collaborators, young people were deported to Germany for forced labor, and much of local property was looted and destroyed. During the occupation, German forces killed and tortured 6,918 Soviet civilians and prisoners of war in the Selidiv district, and 1,250 people were thrown into the shaft of the former "Katerynivka" mine.

Widespread Soviet partisan and guerilla activity hindered the economic exploitation of the region, and aided the Soviet counteroffensive that expelled Axis forces from Selydivka. The occupation caused significant destruction, but the post-war years were marked by a determined effort to rebuild. By 1947, the collective farms in Selydivka had regained 97% of their pre-war sown area, and the village's industrial and agricultural enterprises were restored and expanded.

=== Post-war expansion and industrial growth ===
The post-war period was a time of significant industrial growth for Selydivka. In 1952, work began on the construction of several large coal mines in the area, including "Selydivska" No. 1-2, "Selydivska-South," "Kotlyarivska" No. 1-2, and "Lisovska" No. 1-2. These mines, each with a design capacity of thousands of tons of coal per day, became central to the local economy. In 1955, the "Selydivcoal" trust was established to manage the mines in the Selydiv district.

On November 16, 1956, Selydivka was officially renamed Selydove, and in December 1962, it was granted the status of a city of regional subordination. This period marked the transformation of Selydove from a rural village into a burgeoning industrial center. By the late 20th century, the city had become home to numerous industrial enterprises, including coal mines, a coal beneficiation factory, a bakery, a factory producing reinforced concrete products, and various other manufacturing plants. The development of the Donetsk-Dnipropetrovsk highway further connected Selydove to the broader region, facilitating economic growth.

=== Developments in the 21st century ===
On December 1, 1991, 83.90% of residents of the city of Selydove voted "For" the independence of Ukraine and separation from the Soviet Union at the All-Ukrainian Referendum.

Until April 30, 2023, discussions on renaming streets continued in Selidivska urban community of Donetsk region, in accordance with the recommendations of the Ukrainian Institute of National Remembrance, a list of streets and alleys on the territory of the community, which are subject to name changes, was determined. There are 36 such toponyms in the city of Selydove. In this city in Donetsk region, there are still streets that were named during the communist regime and carry messages of the Soviet past. For some reason, no local government has yet changed this. For example, the city's central street is still named after Karl Marx.

==== Russo-Ukrainian War ====
During the Russian invasion of Ukraine, multiple high rise buildings and the central city hospital were shelled by the Russian Armed Forces. On November 14, 2023, according to State Emergency Service of Ukraine, at least 2 civilians were killed and 3 injured; 1 private residential building was destroyed, a 4-story residential building was partially destroyed, 16 private and 7 apartment buildings were damaged. Attacks on November 21, 2023 and February 14, 2024 partially destroyed, among other buildings, several buildings of Central city hospital (3 people were killed and several injured in each attack).

In mid July 2024, it was reported that local sympathisers with the Russian Armed Forces (informally called zhduny, Ukrainian: ждуни 'those who wait') used Telegram groups to exchange information and aid the Russian forces.

===== Battle for Selydove =====
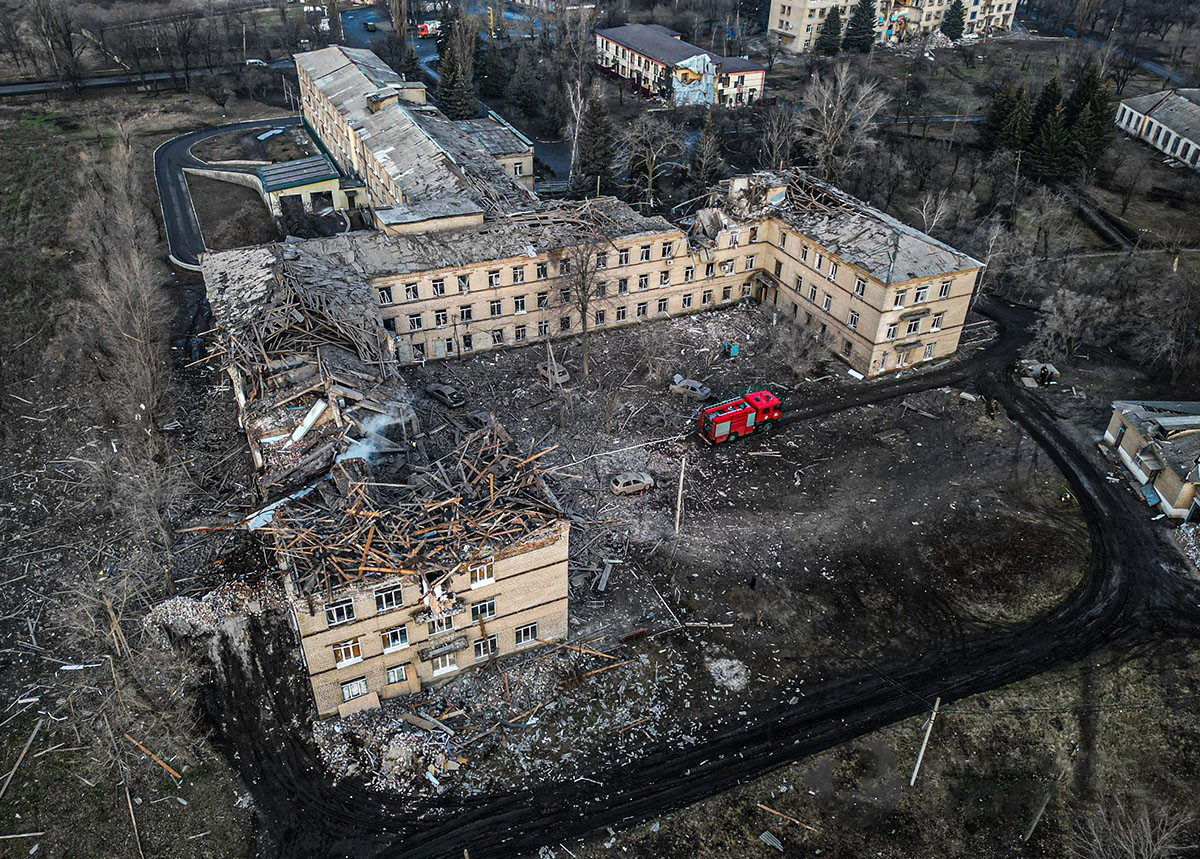
Central city hospital after missile attacks in 2023–2024

In late August 2024, Selydove became a frontline city of the war. As part of an offensive effort to capture the strategic city of Pokrovsk, Russian forces advanced south of Pokrovsk, nearing the outskirts of Ukrainsk and Selydove, capturing nearby settlements. According to The Kyiv Independent, fighting over the city began shortly after, in the Battle of Selydove.

On October 20, Russian military bloggers claimed that intense "street by street" fighting took place between Russian and Ukrainian forces on the outskirts of the city. Russian forces were supposedly using similar tactics as in other cities in Donetsk Oblast, surrounding the settlement until the Ukrainian units are forced to retreat, which was corrobated by Ukrainian military expert Denys Popovych. As claimed by him, Russian forces are currently not directly progressing towards Pokrovsk, instead focusing on Selydove, a crucial town for the defense of Pokrovsk. By trying to encircle the Ukrainian forces in Selydove, the Russians hope to bypass the local slag heaps and force a retreat. After capturing the slag heaps, the Russian forces would have fire control over the surroundings of Pokrovsk with the elevated ground. Russian tactics mirror the tactical strategy in Vuhledar. Popovych further stated that Ukrainian defence was hampered by a critical shortage of manpower.

On October 22, the commander of the Aidar's 24th Separate Assault Brigade, Stanyslav Bunyatov, announced that half of the city was captured by Russian forces, citing lack of manpower as an issue. The next day, it was confirmed by DeepStateMap.Live. The Ukrainian military said that the city was "on the verge" of being seized. On the evening of October 23, fighting had reached the city center.

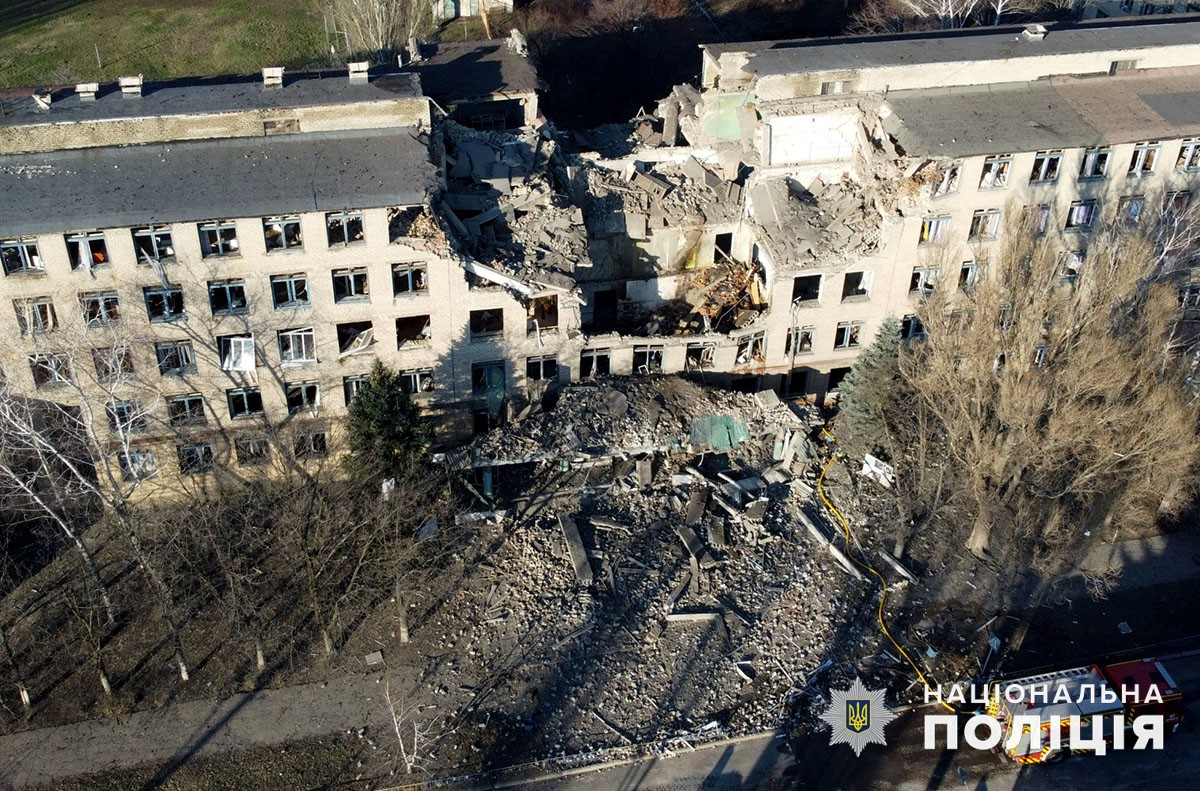
College in Selydove after a Russian missile strike, 5 December 2023

On October 26, Russian forces advanced to the outskirts of the village of Vyshneve, further deteriorating the control over supply lines to the city. In the following days, Russia nearly encircled Selydove, with most roads cut off or under fire control.

By October 27, DeepStateMap.Live showed that Russian forces had advanced and occupied most of the city, with the north-western outskirts remaining disputed territory. Russian sources claimed the same day that the entire city had been captured. On October 29, DeepState reported Russian advances in the north-western portions, leaving the city nearly fully occupied. The city's capture was confirmed on October 30, 2024.

In the aftermath of the battle for the town, a commander disclosed that the city was defended by six Ukrainian positions, composed of about 60 soldiers. Because of this low manpower in contrast to Russian forces, the Ukrainian contingent was quickly encircled and had to retreat with heavy casualties. Furthermore, 300 recruits were sent to Selydove to get basic training on the frontline during the battle.

During the battle for the city, footage of several possible Russian war crimes surfaced. Ukraine's Prosecutor General Office launched an investigation into the reported murder of two women in a residential sector that likely was under Russian control, the shooting of a civilian car that caused injury, and the execution of four Ukrainian National Guard POWs.

== Governance ==
=== Localities ===
The city is composed of the following localities: City center, microdistrict "Sonyachny", residential complex "Youth", microdistrict "Northern", microdistrict "Southern", "Naklonka" (eastern private sector), "Voroshilivka" (western private sector), 11th quarter, the village of Urala and the village of the brick factory.

== Demographics ==
As of the 2001 Ukrainian census, the city had a population of 26,875. The majority of the population are ethnic Ukrainians, accounting for roughly 60% of the population, while Russians make up the largest minority. The lingua franca in the city is Russian. The exact ethnic and linguistic composition was as follows:

As of the January 2025, the population of the city is approximately 4,500 people

=== Ethnicity ===
Ethnic groups in Selydove
	percent
Ukrainians	59.3%
Russians	36.7%
Belarusians	1.1%
Tatars	0.5%
Ukrainian Greeks	0.4%
Germans	0.2%

=== Language ===
First languages in Selydove
	percent
Russian	66.8%
Ukrainian	31.5%
Armenian	0.3%
Belarusian	0.1%
others	0.2%

== Economy ==
The Central mineral processing factory "Selydivska" is located in the city, among other factories that produce the following: reinforced concrete products, asphalt-concrete, and bakery products. The coal mines (Selydovoy Closed Mines), canning, dairy, and brick factories are closed.

Near the city is the "Selydivka" cargo and passenger railway station of the Donetsk Railway, running on the Rutchenkove—Pokrovsk train line between the Tsukuryne (9 km) and Chunishyne (16 km) stations. It is located in the town of Vyshneve.

== Culture ==
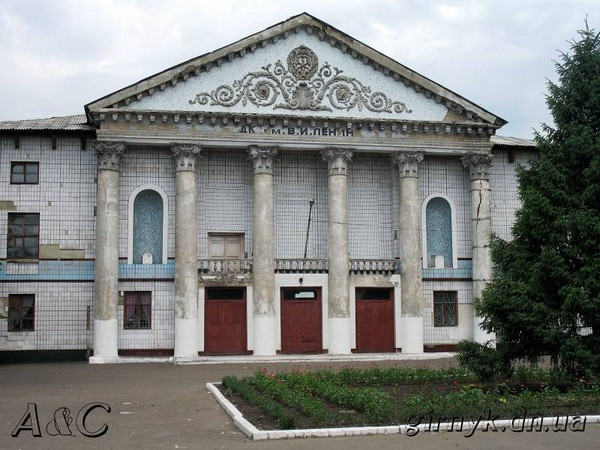
Palace of Culture of Selydove

In the city, there is a historical museum of military and labor glory at the Selydiv Vocational Lyceum, founded in 1988 (Order on Vocational Training No. 181 dated October 20, 1988), the head of the museum is Lyubov Mykolaivna Suvernyova.

The museum has collected exhibits about the local Soviet war effort during the Second World War. In May 2008, the museum was registered in the Donetsk Center of Tourism and Local Lore of Students. The museum is a center of patriotic education of students based on the examples of the older generations at the lyceum. Courage lessons, meetings with war veterans, ATO, Afghans, celebrations of the liberation of the city and the Donbas, Victory Day, and the Revolution of Dignity are held here. Search group "Search" led by teacher Nemykina N. V. replenished the Lyceum museum with memories of war veterans V. A. Alekseeva, I. M. Dryuk and A. Kralja. Students support veteran Lyceum graduates who died in Afghanistan, congratulate them on the holidays, help them organize their gardens. The museum hosts exhibitions of flower compositions for the day of the liberation of Donbas, teacher's day and vocational training, exhibitions of decorative and applied arts.

The museum hosts tours of first-year students, school students on open days and military-patriotic work. The exhibition of Cossack household items and Cossack weapons, which was held by Fedorov M. V.—the yurt of the Selydiv yurt of the Donetsk Cossacks. Conversations of young men with representatives of the military committee "Service in the ranks of the Armed Forces of Ukraine", meetings with graduating soldiers are held regularly.

The museum has an open room of Ukrainian life "Svitlitsa", where exhibitions of Easter eggs, spring flowers, drawings, Cossack and folklore holidays are held. The "Wisdom Box" of the lyceum is kept in the sanctuary, where the rules of behavior of the pupils, which are based on the traditions of ethnology, are recorded. The local newspaper "Nasha Zorya" repeatedly reported on the events held at the Lyceum Museum.

=== Attractions ===
There are 19 monuments of history and one monument of monumental art in the city of Selidove (Sights of Selidovoy), Donetsk Oblast. In total, there are three monuments to Lenin and four mass graves of Soviet soldiers.

In 1965, in Selidovo, when the first secretary of the Communist Party of Ukraine was Petro Shelest, it was planned to build a stele dedicated to the Zaporizhia Cossacks. In its place, in 1977, on the initiative of the first secretary of the Selydiv Communist Party Yuriy Yakimovich Burgas and the head of the executive committee of the city council of workers' deputies Anatoly Dmytrovych Kladko, who were not afraid of the harassment of the higher authorities, the monument "A Cossack on guard" by Donetsk sculptor Pavlo Heveke was erected: A mustachioed sentinel leaned on a high stone pillar with his right hand clutching the handle of a saber. A pipe is clutched in her left hand, which is raised up to shield herself from the sun's rays. The Cossack looks towards Crimea.

In 1987, a second monument made by Pavlo Heveke was erected on the bank of the Solonaya River: On the elevation in the shape of a Cossack grave, sculptural figures of three Cossacks are depicted. In the middle, a Cossack leaning on an oar listens to his comrades playing the bandura. He is also listened to by the third Cossack, who, half-lying, leaned on the hilt of the saber.

This is the third monument to the Zaporozhian victory. The first is set on the Mediterranean island of Malta in one of the ruler's palaces: The throne on which the prince sits is supported by a negro and a Cossack with a herring. The second monument was erected in 1897 on the Taman Peninsula above the Kuban. It is dedicated to the settlement of Zaporizhzhya Cossacks in the Kuban.

In early September 2015, a monument to Lenin was dismantled.

=== Gallery ===
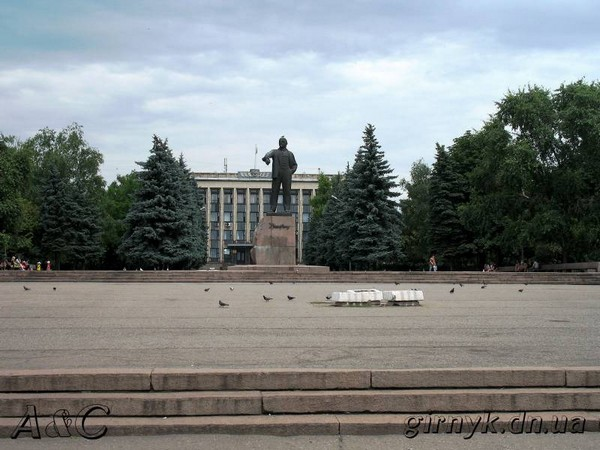
Central square of the city

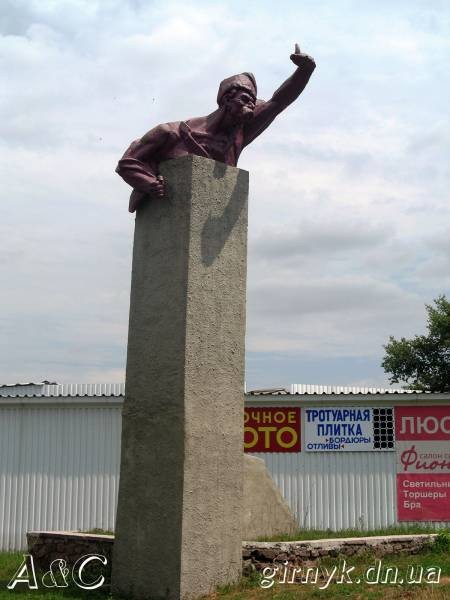
Monument "Cossack on guard"

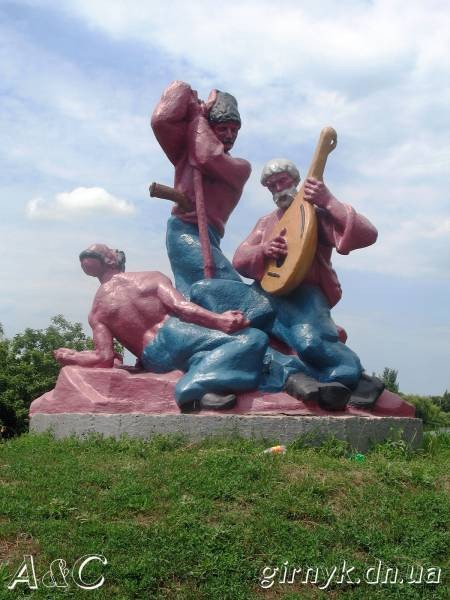
Monument to the unknown Cossacks

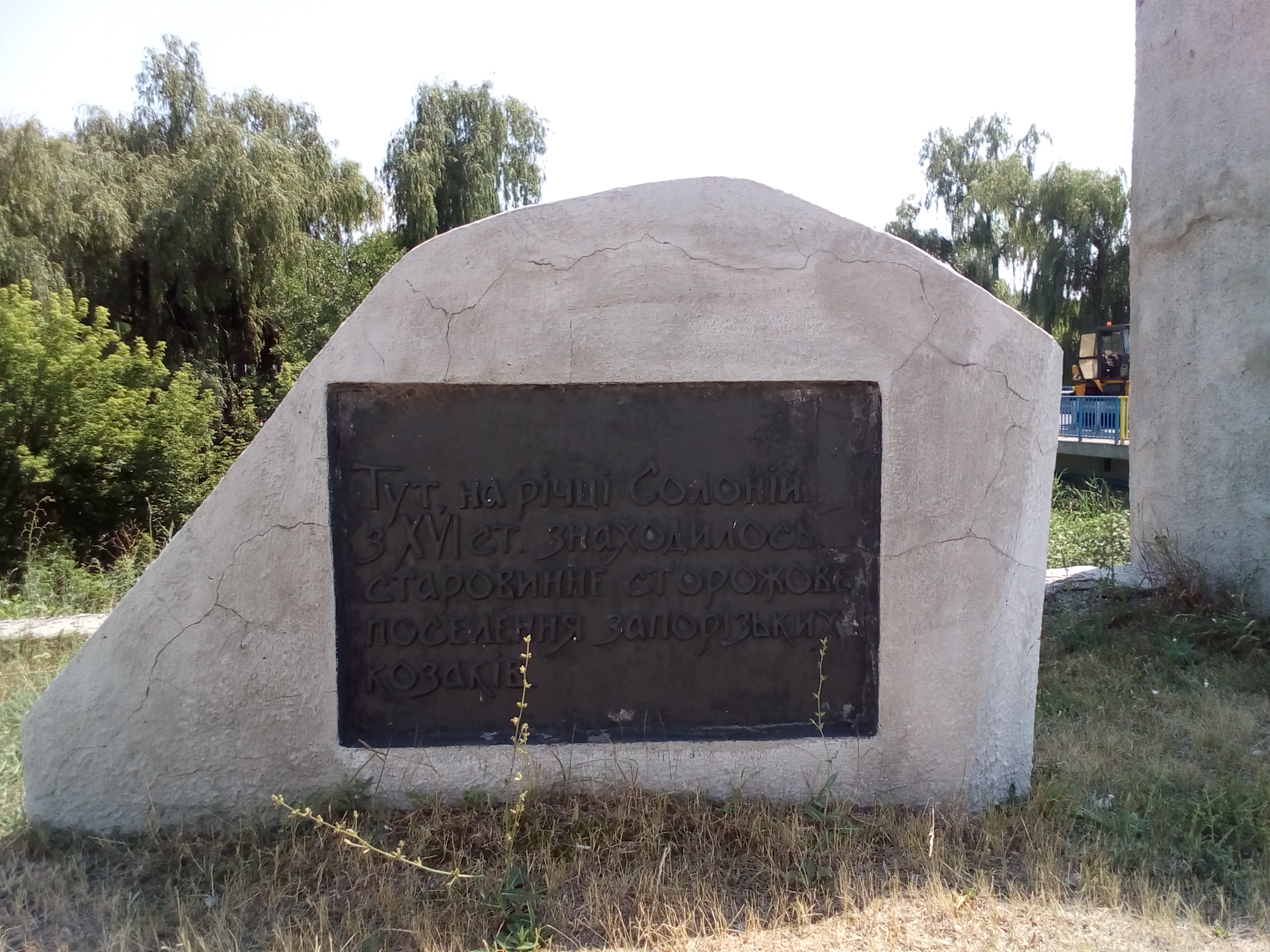
Plaque "Cossack on guard" (2018)

Tomb of the Afghan soldier, ensign E. D. Bondar D. in Selidove (2020)

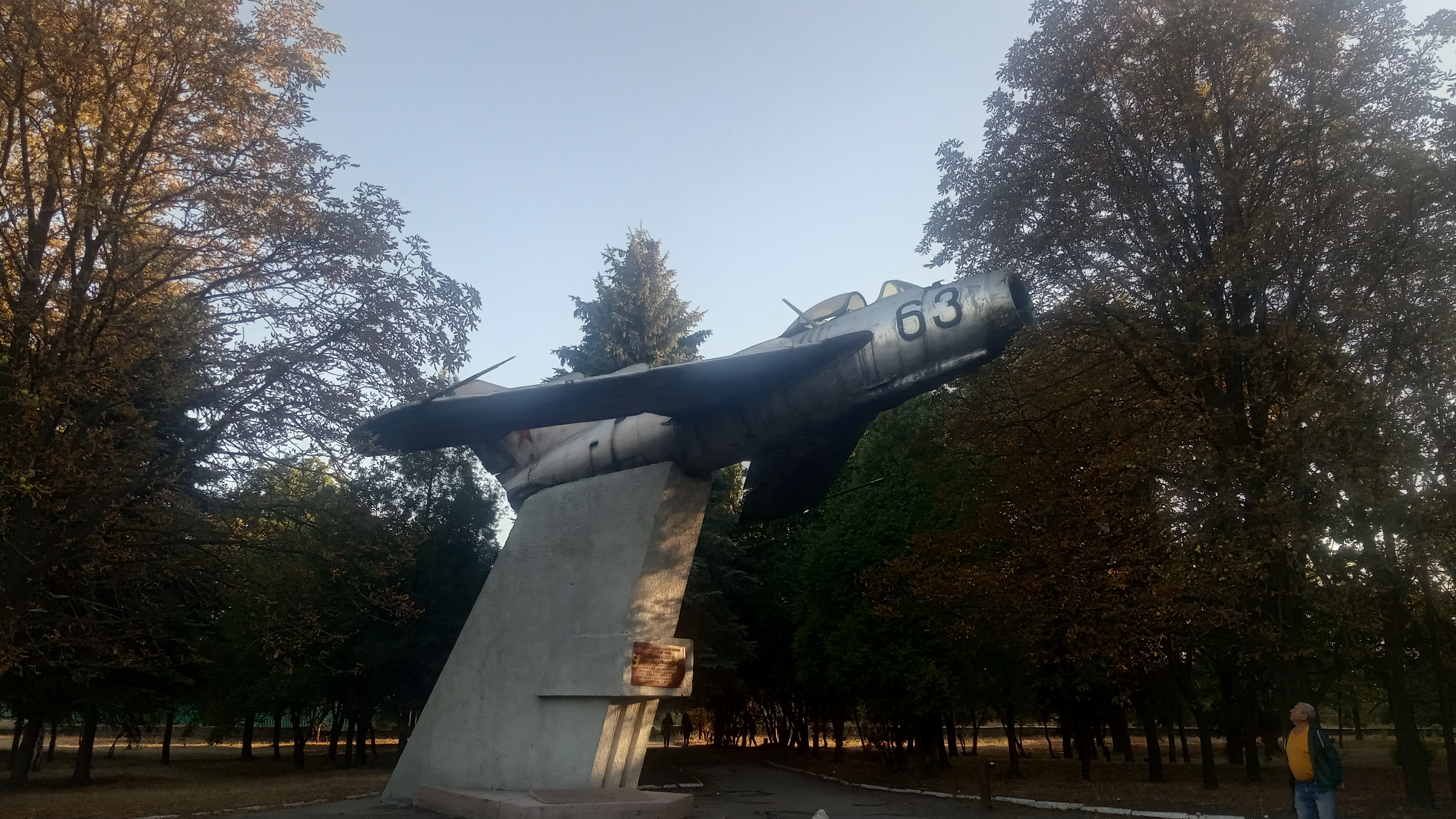
Monument to the country pilot O. L. Kolesnikov, in the park on the Central street

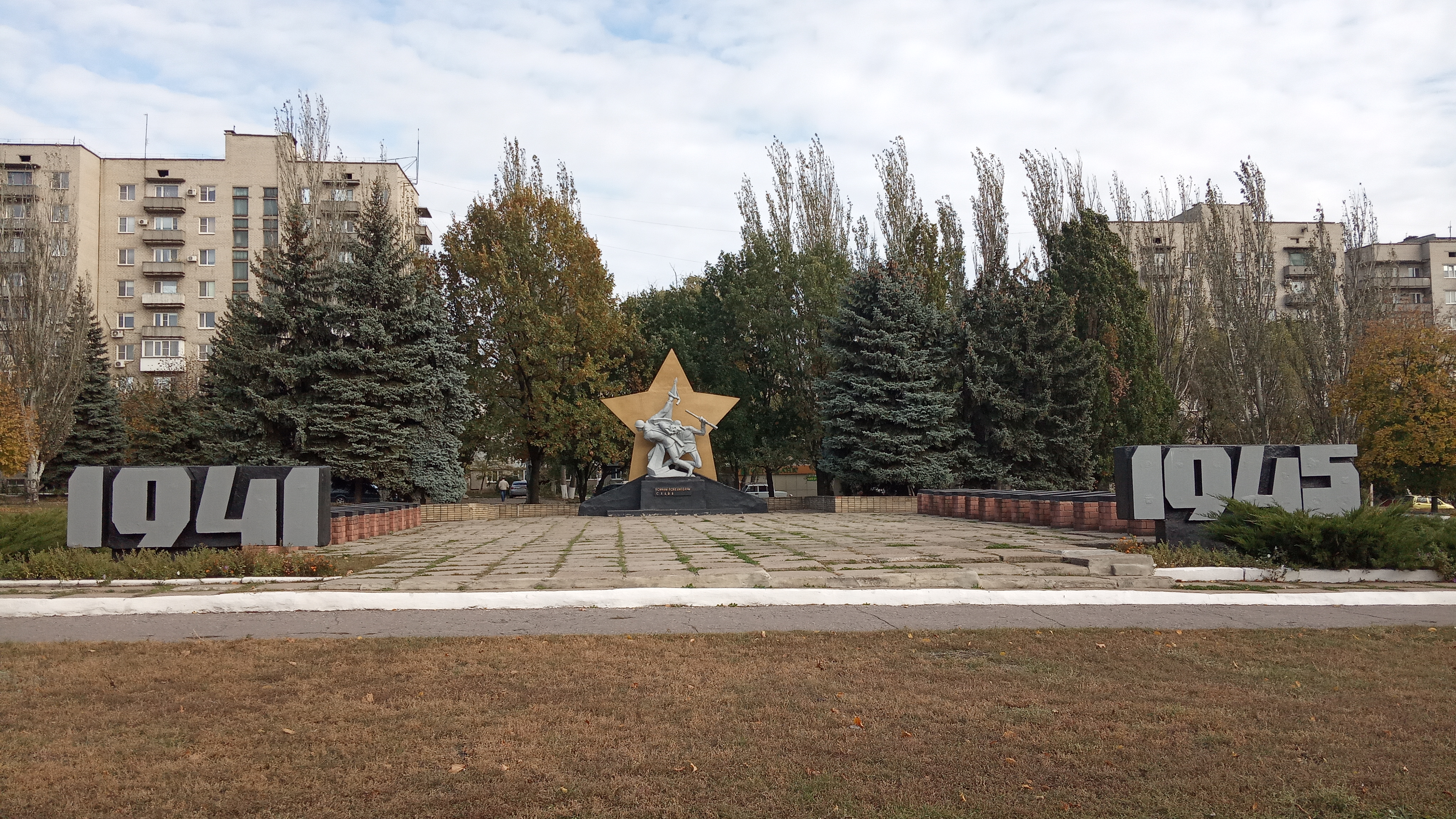
Monument to the liberating soldiers and country soldiers

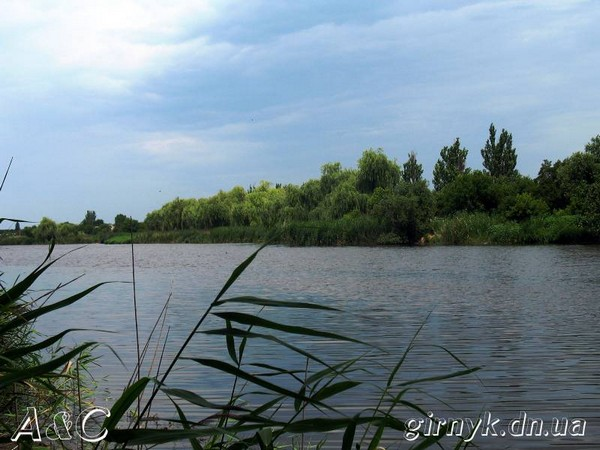
Salt River in the city

== Notable people ==
- Brovko Ivan Karpovych (1908—1989) — Soviet military pilot, participant in the Spanish Civil War and Second World War, lieutenant general of aviation.
- Valentyna Oleksiivna Dyachenko (born 1931) is a Ukrainian sculptor.
- Agia Abbasivna of Zagreb (born 1982) — Ukrainian lawyer, former state commissioner of the Antimonopoly Committee of Ukraine.
- Eduard Mor (born 1977) is a former Ukrainian, Russian football player who played as a defender.
- Eduard Prutnik (born 1973) — former people's deputy of Ukraine.
- Valeriy Soldatenko (born 1946) — Ukrainian historian, head of the Ukrainian Institute of National Remembrance (2010—2014), doctor of historical sciences, professor, corresponding member of the National Academy of Sciences of Ukraine (since 2006).
- Reva Viktor Yakovych (born 1954) is a Ukrainian composer.
- Yuriy Vasyliovych Romanko (born 1977) — honored master of sports of Ukraine in kickboxing.
- Shutov Ilya Yakymovych (born 1957) — an active participant in the national liberation struggle for independence and the democratic system of Ukraine – Status of a fighter for the independence of Ukraine in the 20th century, public figure, scientist, lawyer, journalist.
- Tetyana Mykolayivna Yalovchak (born 1979) — Ukrainian climber, Volunteer.
