= Vyshneve, Pokrovsk Raion, Donetsk Oblast =

Urban locality in Donetsk Oblast, Ukraine

Vyshneve Вишневе
- Rural settlement
- Interactive map of Vyshneve
- Location of Vyshneve Vyshneve (Ukraine)
- Coordinates: 48°09′01″N 37°14′57″E
- Country: Ukraine
- Oblast: Donetsk Oblast
- Raion: Pokrovsk Raion
- Hromada: Selydove urban hromada
- Elevation: 174 m (571 ft)

Population (2022)
  - Total: 244
- Time zone: UTC+2
  - Summer (DST): UTC+3
- Postal code: 85481
- Area code: +380 6237
- KATOTTH: UA14160230030038112

Vyshneve (Ukrainian: Вишневе; Russian: Вишнёвое, romanized: Vishnyovoye) is a rural settlement in Selydove urban hromada, Pokrovsk Raion, Donetsk Oblast, eastern Ukraine. The population is 244 (2022 estimate).

== History ==
=== Russian unvasion of Ukraine ===
On 3 November 2024, Russian forces claimed to have taken the settlement as a part of the Pokrovsk offensive.

== Demographics ==
Native language as of the Ukrainian Census of 2001:

- Ukrainian: 27.3%
- Russian: 72.7%
