= Bukreyevo-Bobrik =

Rural locality in Kursk Oblast, Russia

Bukreyevo-Bobrik Букреево-Бобрик
- Village
- Interactive map of Bukreyevo-Bobrik
- Location of Bukreyevo-Bobrik Bukreyevo-Bobrik (Kursk Oblast)
- Coordinates: 51°29′55″N 35°25′02″E
- Country: Russia
- Federal subject: Kursk Oblast
- Administrative district: Lgovsky District
- SelsovietSelsoviet: Vyshnederevensky

Population (2010 Census)
  - Total: 62
  - Estimate (2010): 62 (0%)

Municipal status
  - Municipal district: Lgovsky Municipal District
  - Rural settlement: Vyshnederevensky Selsoviet Rural Settlement
- Time zone: UTC+3 (MSK)
- Postal code: 307702
- Dialing code: +7 47140
- OKTMO ID: 38622417116
- Website: vishderss.rkursk.ru

Bukreyevo-Bobrik (Russian: Букреево-Бобрик) is a rural locality (Russian: деревня, lit. 'village') in Vyshnederevensky Selsoviet Rural Settlement, Lgovsky District, Kursk Oblast, Russia. Population: 62 (2010 census); 98 (2002 census);

== Geography ==
The village is located on the Bobrik River (a left tributary of the Reut River in the Seym basin), 36 km from the Russia–Ukraine border, 60 km south-west of Kursk, 20 km south-east of the district center – the town Lgov, 10.5 km from the selsoviet center – Vyshniye Derevenki.

Climate

Bukreyevo-Bobrik has a warm-summer humid continental climate (Dfb in the Köppen climate classification).

Climate data for Bukreyevo-Bobrik
Month	Jan	Feb	Mar	Apr	May	Jun	Jul	Aug	Sep	Oct	Nov	Dec	Year
Mean daily maximum °C (°F)	−3.8 (25.2)	−2.8 (27.0)	3.2 (37.8)	13.2 (55.8)	19.4 (66.9)	22.7 (72.9)	25.2 (77.4)	24.6 (76.3)	18.2 (64.8)	10.7 (51.3)	3.6 (38.5)	−0.9 (30.4)	11.1 (52.0)
Daily mean °C (°F)	−5.9 (21.4)	−5.4 (22.3)	−0.5 (31.1)	8.3 (46.9)	14.7 (58.5)	18.4 (65.1)	20.9 (69.6)	20 (68)	14 (57)	7.4 (45.3)	1.4 (34.5)	−2.9 (26.8)	7.5 (45.5)
Mean daily minimum °C (°F)	−8.4 (16.9)	−8.5 (16.7)	−4.6 (23.7)	2.8 (37.0)	9.1 (48.4)	13 (55)	15.8 (60.4)	14.8 (58.6)	9.7 (49.5)	4 (39)	−0.9 (30.4)	−5.1 (22.8)	3.5 (38.2)
Average precipitation mm (inches)	51 (2.0)	44 (1.7)	48 (1.9)	50 (2.0)	63 (2.5)	70 (2.8)	74 (2.9)	54 (2.1)	57 (2.2)	57 (2.2)	47 (1.9)	49 (1.9)	664 (26.1)
Source: https://en.climate-data.org/asia/russian-federation/kursk-oblast/bukreyevo-bobrik-654464/

== Transport ==
Bukreyevo-Bobrik is located 8.5 km from the road of regional importance 38K-024 (Lgov – Sudzha), 1 km from the road of intermunicipal significance 38Н-443 (38K-024 – Vyshniye Derevenki – Durovo-Bobrik), on the road 38Н-444 (38N-443 – Stremoukhovo-Bobrik – border with Kurchatovsky District), 5.5 km from the nearest (closed) railway halt Derevenki (railway line Lgov I — Podkosylev).

The rural locality is situated 67 km from Kursk Vostochny Airport, 124 km from Belgorod International Airport and 266 km from Voronezh Peter the Great Airport.
