= Lyushinka =

Rural locality in Kursk Oblast, Russia

Lyushinka Люшинка
- Village
- Interactive map of Lyushinka
- Location of Lyushinka Lyushinka (Kursk Oblast)
- Coordinates: 51°41′12″N 35°19′24″E
- Country: Russia
- Federal subject: Kursk Oblast
- Administrative district: Lgovsky District
- SelsovietSelsoviet: Gorodensky

Population (2010 Census)
  - Total: 59
  - Estimate (2010): 59 (0%)

Municipal status
  - Municipal district: Lgovsky Municipal District
  - Rural settlement: Gorodensky Selsoviet Rural Settlement
- Time zone: UTC+3 (MSK)
- Postal code: 307750
- Dialing code: +7 47140
- OKTMO ID: 38622420106
- Website: gorodensk.rkursk.ru

Lyushinka (Russian: Люшинка) is a rural locality (Russian: деревня, lit. 'village') in Gorodensky Selsoviet Rural Settlement, Lgovsky District, Kursk Oblast, Russia. Population: 59 (2010 census); 64 (2002 census);

== Geography ==
The village is located on the Seym River, 52 km from the Russia–Ukraine border, 59 km south-west of Kursk, 4 km north-east of the district center – the town Lgov, 1.5 km from the selsoviet center – Gorodensk.

Climate

Lyushinka has a warm-summer humid continental climate (Dfb in the Köppen climate classification).

== Transport ==
Lyushinka is located 6 km from the road of regional importance 38K-017 (Kursk – Lgov – Rylsk – border with Ukraine) as part of the European route E38, 3.5 km from the road 38K-042 (38K-017 – Lgov), on the road of intermunicipal significance 38H-433 (Lgov – Gorodensk – Borisovka – Rechitsa), 6 km from the nearest railway station Sherekino (railway line Navlya – Lgov-Kiyevsky).

The rural locality is situated 66 km from Kursk Vostochny Airport, 144 km from Belgorod International Airport and 269 km from Voronezh Peter the Great Airport.
