= Kozyi Ugony =

Rural locality in Kursk Oblast, Russia

Kozyi Ugony Козьи Угоны
- Village
- Interactive map of Kozyi Ugony
- Location of Kozyi Ugony Kozyi Ugony (Kursk Oblast)
- Coordinates: 51°36′27″N 35°23′15″E
- Country: Russia
- Federal subject: Kursk Oblast
- Administrative district: Lgovsky District
- SelsovietSelsoviet: Bolsheugonsky

Population (2010 Census)
  - Total: 65
  - Estimate (2010): 65 (0%)

Municipal status
  - Municipal district: Lgovsky Municipal District
  - Rural settlement: Bolsheugonsky Selsoviet Rural Settlement
- Time zone: UTC+3 (MSK)
- Postal code: 307715
- Dialing code: +7 47140
- OKTMO ID: 38622410131
- Website: b-ugoni.ru

Kozyi Ugony (Russian: Козьи Угоны) is a rural locality (Russian: деревня, lit. 'village') in Bolsheugonsky Selsoviet Rural Settlement, Lgovsky District, Kursk Oblast, Russia. The population is 65 (2010 census); 85 (2002 census); .

== Geography ==
The village is located on the Seym River, 46 km from the Russia–Ukraine border, 58 km south-west of Kursk, 8 km south-east of the district center – the town Lgov, 2 km from the selsoviet center – Bolshiye Ugony.

Climate

Kozyi Ugony has a warm-summer humid continental climate (Dfb in the Köppen climate classification).

Climate data for Kozyi Ugony
Month	Jan	Feb	Mar	Apr	May	Jun	Jul	Aug	Sep	Oct	Nov	Dec	Year
Mean daily maximum °C (°F)	−3.9 (25.0)	−2.8 (27.0)	3.1 (37.6)	13.2 (55.8)	19.5 (67.1)	22.8 (73.0)	25.3 (77.5)	24.6 (76.3)	18.3 (64.9)	10.7 (51.3)	3.6 (38.5)	−1 (30)	11.1 (52.0)
Daily mean °C (°F)	−5.9 (21.4)	−5.4 (22.3)	−0.5 (31.1)	8.4 (47.1)	14.8 (58.6)	18.4 (65.1)	21 (70)	20 (68)	14.1 (57.4)	7.4 (45.3)	1.3 (34.3)	−2.9 (26.8)	7.6 (45.6)
Mean daily minimum °C (°F)	−8.4 (16.9)	−8.5 (16.7)	−4.7 (23.5)	2.9 (37.2)	9.2 (48.6)	13.1 (55.6)	15.9 (60.6)	14.9 (58.8)	9.8 (49.6)	4 (39)	−1 (30)	−5.1 (22.8)	3.5 (38.3)
Average precipitation mm (inches)	51 (2.0)	44 (1.7)	48 (1.9)	50 (2.0)	63 (2.5)	70 (2.8)	74 (2.9)	54 (2.1)	57 (2.2)	57 (2.2)	47 (1.9)	49 (1.9)	664 (26.1)
Source: https://en.climate-data.org/asia/russian-federation/kursk-oblast/козьи-угоны-654204/

== Transport ==
Kozyi Ugony is located 1.5 km from the road of regional importance 38K-017 (Kursk – Lgov – Rylsk – border with Ukraine) as part of the European route E38, on the road of intermunicipal significance 38H-359 (38K-017 – Malyye Ugony – Pogorelovka), 2 km from the nearest railway halt 408 km (railway line Lgov I — Kursk).

The rural locality is situated 65 km from Kursk Vostochny Airport, 135 km from Belgorod International Airport and 267 km from Voronezh Peter the Great Airport.
