= Prigorodnaya Slobodka =

Rural locality in Kursk Oblast, Russia

Prigorodnaya Slobodka Пригородная Слободка
- Selo
- Interactive map of Prigorodnaya Slobodka
- Location of Prigorodnaya Slobodka Prigorodnaya Slobodka (Kursk Oblast)
- Coordinates: 51°41′34″N 35°18′27″E
- Country: Russia
- Federal subject: Kursk Oblast
- Administrative district: Lgovsky District
- SelsovietSelsoviet: Gorodensky

Population (2010 Census)
  - Total: 551
  - Estimate (2010): 551 (0%)

Municipal status
  - Municipal district: Lgovsky Municipal District
  - Rural settlement: Gorodensky Selsoviet Rural Settlement
- Time zone: UTC+3 (MSK)
- Postal code: 307750
- Dialing code: +7 47140
- OKTMO ID: 38622420116
- Website: gorodensk.rkursk.ru

Prigorodnaya Slobodka (Russian: Пригородная Слободка) is a rural locality (Russian: село, lit. 'village') in Gorodensky Selsoviet Rural Settlement, Lgovsky District, Kursk Oblast, Russia. Population: 551 (2010 census); 603 (2002 census);

== Geography ==
The village is located on the Seym River, 53 km from the Russia–Ukraine border, 61 km west of Kursk, 1 km north-east of the district center – the town Lgov, 4 km from the selsoviet center – Gorodensk.

Climate

Prigorodnaya Slobodka has a warm-summer humid continental climate (Dfb in the Köppen climate classification).

Climate data for Prigorodnaya Slobodka
Month	Jan	Feb	Mar	Apr	May	Jun	Jul	Aug	Sep	Oct	Nov	Dec	Year
Mean daily maximum °C (°F)	−3.9 (25.0)	−2.8 (27.0)	3.1 (37.6)	13.2 (55.8)	19.5 (67.1)	22.7 (72.9)	25.3 (77.5)	24.6 (76.3)	18.3 (64.9)	10.7 (51.3)	3.6 (38.5)	−1 (30)	11.1 (52.0)
Daily mean °C (°F)	−5.9 (21.4)	−5.4 (22.3)	−0.5 (31.1)	8.4 (47.1)	14.8 (58.6)	18.4 (65.1)	20.9 (69.6)	20 (68)	14.1 (57.4)	7.4 (45.3)	1.4 (34.5)	−2.9 (26.8)	7.6 (45.6)
Mean daily minimum °C (°F)	−8.4 (16.9)	−8.5 (16.7)	−4.6 (23.7)	2.9 (37.2)	9.2 (48.6)	13.1 (55.6)	15.9 (60.6)	14.9 (58.8)	9.9 (49.8)	4.1 (39.4)	−0.9 (30.4)	−5.1 (22.8)	3.5 (38.4)
Average precipitation mm (inches)	50 (2.0)	44 (1.7)	48 (1.9)	50 (2.0)	63 (2.5)	71 (2.8)	77 (3.0)	54 (2.1)	57 (2.2)	57 (2.2)	48 (1.9)	49 (1.9)	668 (26.2)
Source: https://en.climate-data.org/asia/russian-federation/kursk-oblast/пригородная-слободка-654013/

== Transport ==
Prigorodnaya Slobodka is located 7.5 km from the road of regional importance 38K-017 (Kursk – Lgov – Rylsk – border with Ukraine) as part of the European route E38, on the road 38K-042 (38K-017 – Lgov), on the road of intermunicipal significance 38H-433 (Lgov – Gorodensk – Borisovka – Rechitsa), 3 km from the nearest railway station Sherekino (railway line Navlya – Lgov-Kiyevsky).

The rural locality is situated 68 km from Kursk Vostochny Airport, 145 km from Belgorod International Airport and 271 km from Voronezh Peter the Great Airport.
