= Oktyabrsky, Lgovsky District, Kursk Oblast =

Rural locality in Kursk Oblast, Russia

Oktyabrsky Октябрьский
- Khutor
- Interactive map of Oktyabrsky
- Location of Oktyabrsky Oktyabrsky (Kursk Oblast)
- Coordinates: 51°38′59″N 35°24′35″E
- Country: Russia
- Federal subject: Kursk Oblast
- Administrative district: Lgovsky District
- SelsovietSelsoviet: Gorodensky

Population (2010 Census)
  - Total: 12
  - Estimate (2010): 12 (0%)

Municipal status
  - Municipal district: Lgovsky Municipal District
  - Rural settlement: Gorodensky Selsoviet Rural Settlement
- Time zone: UTC+3 (MSK)
- Postal code: 307734
- Dialing code: +7 47140
- OKTMO ID: 38622420111
- Website: gorodensk.rkursk.ru

Oktyabrsky (Russian: Октябрьский) is a rural locality (a khutor) in Gorodensky Selsoviet Rural Settlement, Lgovsky District, Kursk Oblast, Russia. Population: 12 (2010 census); 31 (2002 census);

== Geography ==
The khutor is located in the Seym River basin, 51 km from the Russia–Ukraine border, 55 km south-west of Kursk, 10.5 km east of the district center – the town Lgov, 3 km from the selsoviet center – Gorodensk.

Climate

Oktyabrsky has a warm-summer humid continental climate (Dfb in the Köppen climate classification).

== Transport ==
Oktyabrsky is located 5.5 km from the road of regional importance 38K-017 (Kursk – Lgov – Rylsk – border with Ukraine) as part of the European route E38, on the road of intermunicipal significance 38H-433 (Lgov – Gorodensk – Borisovka – Rechitsa), 5.5 km from the nearest railway halt 412 km (railway line Lgov I — Kursk).

The rural locality is situated 61 km from Kursk Vostochny Airport, 138 km from Belgorod International Airport and 265 km from Voronezh Peter the Great Airport.
