= Milyutino, Kursk Oblast =

Rural locality in Kursk Oblast, Russia

Milyutino Милютино
- Village
- Interactive map of Milyutino
- Location of Milyutino Milyutino (Kursk Oblast)
- Coordinates: 51°29′55″N 35°23′41″E
- Country: Russia
- Federal subject: Kursk Oblast
- Administrative district: Lgovsky District
- SelsovietSelsoviet: Vyshnederevensky

Population (2010 Census)
  - Total: 48
  - Estimate (2010): 48 (0%)

Municipal status
  - Municipal district: Lgovsky Municipal District
  - Rural settlement: Vyshnederevensky Selsoviet Rural Settlement
- Time zone: UTC+3 (MSK)
- Postal code: 307702
- Dialing code: +7 47140
- OKTMO ID: 38622417131
- Website: vishderss.rkursk.ru

Milyutino (Russian: Милютино) is a rural locality (Russian: деревня, lit. 'village') in Vyshnederevensky Selsoviet Rural Settlement, Lgovsky District, Kursk Oblast, Russia. Population: 48 (2010 census); 65 (2002 census);

== Geography ==
The village is located on the Bobrik River (a left tributary of the Reut River in the Seym basin), 35 km from the Russia–Ukraine border, 61 km south-west of Kursk, 20 km south-east of the district center – the town Lgov, 10 km from the selsoviet center – Vyshniye Derevenki.

Climate

Milyutino has a warm-summer humid continental climate (Dfb in the Köppen climate classification).

Climate data for Milyutino
Month	Jan	Feb	Mar	Apr	May	Jun	Jul	Aug	Sep	Oct	Nov	Dec	Year
Mean daily maximum °C (°F)	−3.8 (25.2)	−2.8 (27.0)	3.2 (37.8)	13.2 (55.8)	19.4 (66.9)	22.7 (72.9)	25.2 (77.4)	24.6 (76.3)	18.2 (64.8)	10.7 (51.3)	3.6 (38.5)	−0.9 (30.4)	11.1 (52.0)
Daily mean °C (°F)	−5.9 (21.4)	−5.4 (22.3)	−0.5 (31.1)	8.3 (46.9)	14.7 (58.5)	18.4 (65.1)	20.9 (69.6)	20 (68)	14 (57)	7.4 (45.3)	1.4 (34.5)	−2.9 (26.8)	7.5 (45.5)
Mean daily minimum °C (°F)	−8.4 (16.9)	−8.5 (16.7)	−4.6 (23.7)	2.8 (37.0)	9.1 (48.4)	13 (55)	15.8 (60.4)	14.8 (58.6)	9.7 (49.5)	4 (39)	−0.9 (30.4)	−5.1 (22.8)	3.5 (38.2)
Average precipitation mm (inches)	51 (2.0)	44 (1.7)	48 (1.9)	50 (2.0)	63 (2.5)	70 (2.8)	74 (2.9)	54 (2.1)	57 (2.2)	57 (2.2)	47 (1.9)	49 (1.9)	664 (26.1)
Source: https://en.climate-data.org/asia/russian-federation/kursk-oblast/milyutino-654466/

== Transport ==
Milyutino is located 7 km from the road of regional importance 38K-024 (Lgov – Sudzha), on the roads of intermunicipal significance 38Н-443 (38K-024 – Vyshniye Derevenki – Durovo-Bobrik) and 38Н-444 (38N-443 – Stremoukhovo-Bobrik – border with Kurchatovsky District), 4 km from the nearest (closed) railway halt Derevenki (railway line Lgov I — Podkosylev).

The rural locality is situated 68 km from Kursk Vostochny Airport, 125 km from Belgorod International Airport and 267 km from Voronezh Peter the Great Airport.
