= Nikolayevka, Gorodensky selsoviet, Lgovsky District, Kursk Oblast =

Rural locality in Kursk Oblast, Russia

Nikolayevka Николаевка
- Village
- Interactive map of Nikolayevka
- Location of Nikolayevka Nikolayevka (Kursk Oblast)
- Coordinates: 51°38′29″N 35°26′10″E
- Country: Russia
- Federal subject: Kursk Oblast
- Administrative district: Lgovsky District
- SelsovietSelsoviet: Gorodensky

Population (2010 Census)
  - Total: 35
  - Estimate (2010): 35 (0%)

Municipal status
  - Municipal district: Lgovsky Municipal District
  - Rural settlement: Gorodensky Selsoviet Rural Settlement
- Time zone: UTC+3 (MSK)
- Postal code: 307736
- Dialing code: +7 47140
- OKTMO ID: 38622420126
- Website: gorodensk.rkursk.ru

Nikolayevka (Russian: Николаевка) is a rural locality (Russian: деревня, lit. 'village') in Gorodensky Selsoviet Rural Settlement, Lgovsky District, Kursk Oblast, Russia. Population: 35 (2010 census); 47 (2002 census);

== Geography ==
The village is located in the Seym River basin, 51 km from the Russia–Ukraine border, 53 km south-west of Kursk, 13 km south-east of the district center – the town Lgov, 6.5 km from the selsoviet center – Gorodensk.

Climate

Nikolayevka has a warm-summer humid continental climate (Dfb in the Köppen climate classification).

== Transport ==
Nikolayevka is located 4 km from the road of regional importance 38K-017 (Kursk – Lgov – Rylsk – border with Ukraine) as part of the European route E38, on the road of intermunicipal significance 38H-359 (38K-017 – Malyye Ugony – Pogorelovka), 4 km from the nearest railway halt 412 km (railway line Lgov I — Kursk).

The rural locality is situated 60 km from Kursk Vostochny Airport, 136 km from Belgorod International Airport and 263 km from Voronezh Peter the Great Airport.
