= Glushitsa, Kursk Oblast =

Rural locality in Kursk Oblast, Russia

Glushitsa Глушица
- Village
- Interactive map of Glushitsa
- Location of Glushitsa Glushitsa (Kursk Oblast)
- Coordinates: 51°37′13″N 35°26′07″E
- Country: Russia
- Federal subject: Kursk Oblast
- Administrative district: Lgovsky District
- SelsovietSelsoviet: Bolsheugonsky

Population (2010 Census)
  - Total: 34
  - Estimate (2010): 34 (0%)

Municipal status
  - Municipal district: Lgovsky Municipal District
  - Rural settlement: Bolsheugonsky Selsoviet Rural Settlement
- Time zone: UTC+3 (MSK)
- Postal code: 307715
- Dialing code: +7 47140
- OKTMO ID: 38622410121
- Website: b-ugoni.ru

Glushitsa (Russian: Глушица) is a rural locality (Russian: деревня, lit. 'village') in Bolsheugonsky Selsoviet Rural Settlement, Lgovsky District, Kursk Oblast, Russia. Population: 34 (2010 census); 46 (2002 census);

== Geography ==
The village is located on the Seym River, 49 km from the Russia–Ukraine border, 53 km south-west of Kursk, 12 km south-east of the district center – the town Lgov, 3.5 km from the selsoviet center – Bolshiye Ugony.

Climate

Glushitsa has a warm-summer humid continental climate (Dfb in the Köppen climate classification).

== Transport ==
Glushitsa is located 2 km from the road of regional importance 38K-017 (Kursk – Lgov – Rylsk – border with Ukraine) as part of the European route E38, on the road of intermunicipal significance 38H-359 (38K-017 – Malyye Ugony – Pogorelovka), 2 km from the nearest railway halt 412 km (railway line Lgov I — Kursk).

The rural locality is situated 60 km from Kursk Vostochny Airport, 133 km from Belgorod International Airport and 262 km from Voronezh Peter the Great Airport.
