= Bulgakovka, Lgovsky District, Kursk Oblast =

Rural locality in Kursk Oblast, Russia

Bulgakovka Булгаковка
- Village
- Interactive map of Bulgakovka
- Location of Bulgakovka Bulgakovka (Kursk Oblast)
- Coordinates: 51°37′21″N 35°14′02″E
- Country: Russia
- Federal subject: Kursk Oblast
- Administrative district: Lgovsky District
- SelsovietSelsoviet: Vyshnederevensky

Population (2010 Census)
  - Total: 81
  - Estimate (2010): 81 (0%)

Municipal status
  - Municipal district: Lgovsky Municipal District
  - Rural settlement: Vyshnederevensky Selsoviet Rural Settlement
- Time zone: UTC+3 (MSK)
- Postal code: 307751
- Dialing code: +7 47140
- OKTMO ID: 38622417201
- Website: vishderss.rkursk.ru

Bulgakovka (Russian: Булгаковка) is a rural locality (Russian: деревня, lit. 'village') in Vyshnederevensky Selsoviet Rural Settlement, Lgovsky District, Kursk Oblast, Russia. Population: 81 (2010 census); 99 (2002 census);

== Geography ==
The village is located on the Apoka River (a left tributary of the Seym), 44 km from the Russia–Ukraine border, 67 km south-west of Kursk, 4 km south-west of the district center – the town Lgov, 8 km from the selsoviet center – Vyshniye Derevenki.

Climate

Bulgakovka has a warm-summer humid continental climate (Dfb in the Köppen climate classification).

Climate data for Bulgakovka
| Month | Jan | Feb | Mar | Apr | May | Jun | Jul | Aug | Sep | Oct | Nov | Dec | Year |
|---|---|---|---|---|---|---|---|---|---|---|---|---|---|
| Mean daily maximum °C (°F) | −3.8 (25.2) | −2.7 (27.1) | 3.2 (37.8) | 13.2 (55.8) | 19.4 (66.9) | 22.7 (72.9) | 25.2 (77.4) | 24.5 (76.1) | 18.3 (64.9) | 10.7 (51.3) | 3.6 (38.5) | −0.9 (30.4) | 11.1 (52.0) |
| Daily mean °C (°F) | −5.8 (21.6) | −5.3 (22.5) | −0.4 (31.3) | 8.4 (47.1) | 14.8 (58.6) | 18.4 (65.1) | 20.9 (69.6) | 19.9 (67.8) | 14.1 (57.4) | 7.4 (45.3) | 1.4 (34.5) | −2.9 (26.8) | 7.6 (45.6) |
| Mean daily minimum °C (°F) | −8.3 (17.1) | −8.4 (16.9) | −4.5 (23.9) | 2.9 (37.2) | 9.1 (48.4) | 13 (55) | 15.8 (60.4) | 14.8 (58.6) | 9.8 (49.6) | 4 (39) | −0.9 (30.4) | −5.1 (22.8) | 3.5 (38.3) |
| Average precipitation mm (inches) | 51 (2.0) | 44 (1.7) | 48 (1.9) | 50 (2.0) | 63 (2.5) | 71 (2.8) | 76 (3.0) | 53 (2.1) | 57 (2.2) | 57 (2.2) | 47 (1.9) | 49 (1.9) | 666 (26.2) |
Source: https://en.climate-data.org/asia/russian-federation/kursk-oblast/bulgakovka-653968/

== Transport ==
Bulgakovka is located 1.5 km from the road of regional importance 38K-017 (Kursk – Lgov – Rylsk – border with Ukraine), 1.5 km from the road 38K-024 (Lgov – Sudzha), on the road of intermunicipal significance 38H-342 (38K-017 – Arsenyevka – Kochanovka – the railway halt 387 km), 3 km from the nearest railway station Lgov I (Lgov-Kiyevsky) (railway lines: 322 km – Lgov I, Nawlja – Lgov I, Lgov I – Podkosylev and Lgow I – Kursk).

The rural locality is situated 74 km from Kursk Vostochny Airport, 143 km from Belgorod International Airport and 277 km from Voronezh Peter the Great Airport.
