= Vesyolaya Polyana, Kursk Oblast =

Rural locality in Kursk Oblast, Russia

Vesyolaya Polyana Весёлая Поляна
- Khutor
- Interactive map of Vesyolaya Polyana
- Location of Vesyolaya Polyana Vesyolaya Polyana (Kursk Oblast)
- Coordinates: 51°36′00″N 35°14′15″E
- Country: Russia
- Federal subject: Kursk Oblast
- Administrative district: Lgovsky District
- SelsovietSelsoviet: Vyshnederevensky
- Elevation: 171 m (561 ft)

Population (2010 Census)
  - Total: 16
  - Estimate (2010): 16 (0%)

Municipal status
  - Municipal district: Lgovsky Municipal District
  - Rural settlement: Vyshnederevensky Selsoviet Rural Settlement
- Time zone: UTC+3 (MSK)
- Postal code: 307751
- Dialing code: +7 47140
- OKTMO ID: 38622417211
- Website: vishderss.rkursk.ru

Vesyolaya Polyana (Russian: Весёлая Поляна) is a rural locality (a khutor) in Vyshnederevensky Selsoviet Rural Settlement, Lgovsky District, Kursk Oblast, Russia. Population: 16 (2010 census); 22 (2002 census);

== Geography ==
The khutor is located in the Apoka River basin (a left tributary of the Seym), 42 km from the Russia–Ukraine border, 67.5 km south-west of Kursk, 6.5 km south of the district center – the town Lgov, 5.5 km from the selsoviet center – Vyshniye Derevenki.

Climate

Vesyolaya Polyana has a warm-summer humid continental climate (Dfb in the Köppen climate classification).

== Transport ==
Vesyolaya Polyana is located 3.5 km from the road of regional importance 38K-017 (Kursk – Lgov – Rylsk – border with Ukraine), 1.5 km from the road 38K-024 (Lgov – Sudzha), 1 km from the road of intermunicipal significance 38H-342 (38K-017 – Arsenyevka – Kochanovka – the railway halt 387 km), 6 km from the nearest railway halt 387 km (railway line 322 km – Lgov I).

The rural locality is situated 74.5 km from Kursk Vostochny Airport, 141 km from Belgorod International Airport and 277 km from Voronezh Peter the Great Airport.
