= Yekaterinovka, Lgovsky District, Kursk Oblast =

Rural locality in Kursk Oblast, Russia

Yekaterinovka Екатериновка
- Village
- Interactive map of Yekaterinovka
- Location of Yekaterinovka Yekaterinovka (Kursk Oblast)
- Coordinates: 51°34′17″N 35°10′27″E
- Country: Russia
- Federal subject: Kursk Oblast
- Administrative district: Lgovsky District
- SelsovietSelsoviet: Vyshnederevensky

Population (2010 Census)
  - Total: 14
  - Estimate (2010): 14 (0%)

Municipal status
  - Municipal district: Lgovsky Municipal District
  - Rural settlement: Vyshnederevensky Selsoviet Rural Settlement
- Time zone: UTC+3 (MSK)
- Postal code: 307744
- Dialing code: +7 47140
- OKTMO ID: 38622417226
- Website: vishderss.rkursk.ru

Yekaterinovka (Russian: Екатериновка) is a rural locality (Russian: деревня, lit. 'village') in Vyshnederevensky Selsoviet Rural Settlement, Lgovsky District, Kursk Oblast, Russia. Population: 14 (2010 census); 39 (2002 census);

== Geography ==
The village is located in the Apoka River basin (a left tributary of the Seym), 38 km from the Russia–Ukraine border, 73 km south-west of Kursk, 11 km south-west of the district center – the town Lgov, 9 km from the selsoviet center – Vyshniye Derevenki.

Climate

Yekaterinovka has a warm-summer humid continental climate (Dfb in the Köppen climate classification).

== Transport ==
Yekaterinovka is located 7.5 km from the road of regional importance 38K-017 (Kursk – Lgov – Rylsk – border with Ukraine), 6.5 km from the road 38K-024 (Lgov – Sudzha), 3.5 km from the road of intermunicipal significance 38Н-448 (38K-024 – Maleyevka – Lyubomirovka), 3.5 km from the nearest railway halt Kolontayevka (railway line 322 km – Lgov I).

The rural locality is situated 79.5 km from Kursk Vostochny Airport, 142 km from Belgorod International Airport and 282 km from Voronezh Peter the Great Airport.
