= Vasilyevka, Lgovsky District, Kursk Oblast =

Rural locality in Kursk Oblast, Russia

Vasilyevka Васильевка
- Village
- Interactive map of Vasilyevka
- Location of Vasilyevka Vasilyevka (Kursk Oblast)
- Coordinates: 51°35′46″N 35°15′09″E
- Country: Russia
- Federal subject: Kursk Oblast
- Administrative district: Lgovsky District
- SelsovietSelsoviet: Vyshnederevensky
- Elevation: 181 m (594 ft)

Population (2010 Census)
  - Total: 7
  - Estimate (2010): 7 (0%)

Municipal status
  - Municipal district: Lgovsky Municipal District
  - Rural settlement: Vyshnederevensky Selsoviet Rural Settlement
- Time zone: UTC+3 (MSK)
- Postal code: 307751
- Dialing code: +7 47140
- OKTMO ID: 38622417206
- Website: vishderss.rkursk.ru

Vasilyevka (Russian: Васильевка) is a rural locality (Russian: деревня, lit. 'village') in Vyshnederevensky Selsoviet Rural Settlement, Lgovsky District, Kursk Oblast, Russia. Population: 7 (2010 census); 12 (2002 census);

== Geography ==
The village is located on the Apoka River (a left tributary of the Seym), 41.5 km from the Russia–Ukraine border, 66 km south-west of Kursk, 6.5 km south of the district center – the town Lgov, 5 km from the selsoviet center – Vyshniye Derevenki.

Climate

Vasilyevka has a warm-summer humid continental climate (Dfb in the Köppen climate classification).

== Transport ==
Vasilyevka is located 3.5 km from the road of regional importance 38K-017 (Kursk – Lgov – Rylsk – border with Ukraine), 0.5 km from the road 38K-024 (Lgov – Sudzha), on the road of intermunicipal significance 38Н-448 (38K-024 – Maleyevka – Lyubomirovka), 4.5 km from the nearest (closed) railway halt Sugrov (railway line Lgov I — Podkosylev).

The rural locality is situated 73.5 km from Kursk Vostochny Airport, 140 km from Belgorod International Airport and 276 km from Voronezh Peter the Great Airport.
