= Artakovo =

Rural locality in Kursk Oblast, Russia

Artakovo Артаково
- Settlement
- Interactive map of Artakovo
- Location of Artakovo Artakovo (Kursk Oblast)
- Coordinates: 51°37′59″N 35°11′48″E
- Country: Russia
- Federal subject: Kursk Oblast
- Administrative district: Lgovsky District
- SelsovietSelsoviet: Selektsionny

Population (2010 Census)
  - Total: 21
  - Estimate (2010): 21 (0%)

Municipal status
  - Municipal district: Lgovsky Municipal District
  - Rural settlement: Selektsionny Selsoviet Rural Settlement
- Time zone: UTC+3 (MSK)
- Postal code: 307720
- Dialing code: +7 47140
- OKTMO ID: 38622477121
- Website: selekc.rkursk.ru

Artakovo (Russian: Артаково) is a rural locality (a settlement at the railway station) in Selektsionny Selsoviet Rural Settlement, Lgovsky District, Kursk Oblast, Russia. Population: 21 (2010 census); 31 (2002 census);

== Geography ==
The settlement is located 45 km from the Russia–Ukraine border, 70 km south-west of Kursk, 5 km south-west of the district center – the town Lgov, 2 km from the selsoviet center – Selektsionny.

Climate

Artakovo has a warm-summer humid continental climate (Dfb in the Köppen climate classification).

== Transport ==
Artakovo is located 0.5 km from the road of regional importance 38K-017 (Kursk – Lgov – Rylsk – border with Ukraine) as part of the European route E38, 2.5 km from the road of intermunicipal significance 38H-342 (38K-017 – Arsenyevka – Kochanovka – the railway halt 387 km), next to the railway station Artakowo (railway line 322 km – Lgov I).

The rural locality is situated 76.5 km from Kursk Vostochny Airport, 145 km from Belgorod International Airport and 279 km from Voronezh Peter the Great Airport.
