= Anastasyevka, Kursk Oblast =

Rural locality in Kursk Oblast, Russia

Anastasyevka Анастасьевка
- Village
- Interactive map of Anastasyevka
- Location of Anastasyevka Anastasyevka (Kursk Oblast)
- Coordinates: 51°27′40″N 35°15′12″E
- Country: Russia
- Federal subject: Kursk Oblast
- Administrative district: Lgovsky District
- SelsovietSelsoviet: Vyshnederevensky

Population (2010 Census)
  - Total: 6
  - Estimate (2010): 6 (0%)

Municipal status
  - Municipal district: Lgovsky Municipal District
  - Rural settlement: Vyshnederevensky Selsoviet Rural Settlement
- Time zone: UTC+3 (MSK)
- Postal code: 307730
- Dialing code: +7 47140
- OKTMO ID: 38622417166
- Website: vishderss.rkursk.ru

Anastasyevka (Russian: Анастасьевка) is a rural locality (Russian: деревня, lit. 'village') in Vyshnederevensky Selsoviet Rural Settlement, Lgovsky District, Kursk Oblast, Russia. Population: 6 (2010 census); 19 (2002 census);

== Geography ==
The village is located on the Malaya Loknya River (a left tributary of the Loknya in the Psel basin), 27.5 km from the Russia–Ukraine border, 71 km south-west of Kursk, 21 km south of the district center – the town Lgov, 11.5 km from the selsoviet center – Vyshniye Derevenki.

Climate

Anastasyevka has a warm-summer humid continental climate (Dfb in the Köppen climate classification).

== Transport ==
Anastasyevka is located 18 km from the road of regional importance 38K-017 (Kursk – Lgov – Rylsk – border with Ukraine), 1.5 km from the road 38K-024 (Lgov – Sudzha), 19 km from the road 38K-030 (Rylsk – Korenevo – Sudzha), 1.5 km from the road of intermunicipal significance 38Н-564 (38K-030 – Kauchuk – 38K-024), 3.5 km from the nearest (closed) railway halt Anastasyevka (railway line Lgov I — Podkosylev).

The rural locality is situated 78 km from Kursk Vostochny Airport, 129 km from Belgorod International Airport and 278 km from Voronezh Peter the Great Airport.
