= Bolshaya Orlovka, Kursk Oblast =

Rural locality in Kursk Oblast, Russia

Bolshaya Orlovka Большая Орловка
- Village
- Interactive map of Bolshaya Orlovka
- Location of Bolshaya Orlovka Bolshaya Orlovka (Kursk Oblast)
- Coordinates: 51°34′40″N 35°17′07″E
- Country: Russia
- Federal subject: Kursk Oblast
- Administrative district: Lgovsky District
- SelsovietSelsoviet: Vyshnederevensky

Population (2010 Census)
  - Total: 163
  - Estimate (2010): 163 (0%)

Municipal status
  - Municipal district: Lgovsky Municipal District
  - Rural settlement: Vyshnederevensky Selsoviet Rural Settlement
- Time zone: UTC+3 (MSK)
- Postal code: 307701
- Dialing code: +7 47140
- OKTMO ID: 38622417141
- Website: vishderss.rkursk.ru

Bolshaya Orlovka (Russian: Большая Орловка) is a rural locality (Russian: деревня, lit. 'village') in Vyshnederevensky Selsoviet Rural Settlement, Lgovsky District, Kursk Oblast, Russia. Population: 163 (2010 census); 191 (2002 census);

== Geography ==
The village is located on the Byk River (a left tributary of the Seym), 40 km from the Russia–Ukraine border, 65 km south-west of Kursk, 9 km south-east of the district center – the town Lgov, 1.5 km from the selsoviet center – Vyshniye Derevenki.

Climate

Bolshaya Orlovka has a warm-summer humid continental climate (Dfb in the Köppen climate classification).

== Transport ==
Bolshaya Orlovka is located 5 km from the road of regional importance 38K-017 (Kursk – Lgov – Rylsk – border with Ukraine), 1 km from the road 38K-024 (Lgov – Sudzha), on the roads of intermunicipal significance 38Н-443 (38K-024 – Vyshniye Derevenki – Durovo-Bobrik) and 38Н-442 (38K-024 – Bolshaya Orlovka), 2 km from the nearest (closed) railway halt 11 km (railway line Lgov I — Podkosylev).

The rural locality is situated 72 km from Kursk Vostochny Airport, 136 km from Belgorod International Airport and 273 km from Voronezh Peter the Great Airport.
