= Tsukanovo-Bobrik =

Rural locality in Kursk Oblast, Russia

Tsukanovo-Bobrik Цуканово-Бобрик
- Selo
- Interactive map of Tsukanovo-Bobrik
- Location of Tsukanovo-Bobrik Tsukanovo-Bobrik (Kursk Oblast)
- Coordinates: 51°29′35″N 35°23′17″E
- Country: Russia
- Federal subject: Kursk Oblast
- Administrative district: Lgovsky District
- SelsovietSelsoviet: Vyshnederevensky

Population (2010 Census)
  - Total: 189
  - Estimate (2010): 189 (0%)

Municipal status
  - Municipal district: Lgovsky Municipal District
  - Rural settlement: Vyshnederevensky Selsoviet Rural Settlement
- Time zone: UTC+3 (MSK)
- Postal code: 307702
- Dialing code: +7 47140
- OKTMO ID: 38622417106
- Website: vishderss.rkursk.ru

Tsukanovo-Bobrik (Russian: Цуканово-Бобрик) is a rural locality (Russian: село, lit. 'village') in Vyshnederevensky Selsoviet Rural Settlement, Lgovsky District, Kursk Oblast, Russia. Population: 189 (2010 census); 224 (2002 census);

== Geography ==
The village is located on the Bobrik River (a left tributary of the Reut River in the Seym basin), 33 km from the Russia–Ukraine border, 62 km south-west of Kursk, 20 km south-east of the district center – the town Lgov, 9 km from the selsoviet center – Vyshniye Derevenki.

Climate

Tsukanovo-Bobrik has a warm-summer humid continental climate (Dfb in the Köppen climate classification).

Climate data for Tsukanovo-Bobrik
| Month | Jan | Feb | Mar | Apr | May | Jun | Jul | Aug | Sep | Oct | Nov | Dec | Year |
|---|---|---|---|---|---|---|---|---|---|---|---|---|---|
| Mean daily maximum °C (°F) | −3.8 (25.2) | −2.8 (27.0) | 3.2 (37.8) | 13.2 (55.8) | 19.4 (66.9) | 22.7 (72.9) | 25.2 (77.4) | 24.6 (76.3) | 18.2 (64.8) | 10.7 (51.3) | 3.6 (38.5) | −0.9 (30.4) | 11.1 (52.0) |
| Daily mean °C (°F) | −5.9 (21.4) | −5.4 (22.3) | −0.5 (31.1) | 8.3 (46.9) | 14.7 (58.5) | 18.4 (65.1) | 20.9 (69.6) | 20 (68) | 14 (57) | 7.4 (45.3) | 1.4 (34.5) | −2.9 (26.8) | 7.5 (45.5) |
| Mean daily minimum °C (°F) | −8.4 (16.9) | −8.5 (16.7) | −4.6 (23.7) | 2.8 (37.0) | 9.1 (48.4) | 13 (55) | 15.8 (60.4) | 14.8 (58.6) | 9.7 (49.5) | 4 (39) | −0.9 (30.4) | −5.1 (22.8) | 3.5 (38.2) |
| Average precipitation mm (inches) | 51 (2.0) | 44 (1.7) | 48 (1.9) | 50 (2.0) | 63 (2.5) | 71 (2.8) | 76 (3.0) | 53 (2.1) | 57 (2.2) | 57 (2.2) | 47 (1.9) | 49 (1.9) | 666 (26.2) |
Source: https://en.climate-data.org/asia/russian-federation/kursk-oblast/tsukanovo-bobrik-654467/

== Transport ==
Tsukanovo-Bobrik is located 5.5 km from the road of regional importance 38K-024 (Lgov – Sudzha), on the road of intermunicipal significance 38Н-443 (38K-024 – Vyshniye Derevenki – Durovo-Bobrik), 3.5 km from the nearest (closed) railway halt Derevenki (railway line Lgov I — Podkosylev).

The rural locality is situated 69 km from Kursk Vostochny Airport, 125 km from Belgorod International Airport and 269 km from Voronezh Peter the Great Airport.
