= Bezhentsev =

Rural locality in Kursk Oblast, Russia

Bezhentsev Беженцев
- Khutor
- Interactive map of Bezhentsev
- Location of Bezhentsev Bezhentsev (Kursk Oblast)
- Coordinates: 51°33′12″N 35°13′58″E
- Country: Russia
- Federal subject: Kursk Oblast
- Administrative district: Lgovsky District
- SelsovietSelsoviet: Vyshnederevensky

Population (2010 Census)
  - Total: 14
  - Estimate (2010): 14 (0%)

Municipal status
  - Municipal district: Lgovsky Municipal District
  - Rural settlement: Vyshnederevensky Selsoviet Rural Settlement
- Time zone: UTC+3 (MSK)
- Postal code: 307745
- Dialing code: +7 47140
- OKTMO ID: 38622417196
- Website: vishderss.rkursk.ru

Bezhentsev (Russian: Беженцев) is a rural locality (a khutor) in Vyshnederevensky Selsoviet Rural Settlement, Lgovsky District, Kursk Oblast, Russia. Population: 14 (2010 census); 24 (2002 census);

== Geography ==
The khutor is located on the Apoka River (a left tributary of the Seym), 37 km from the Russia–Ukraine border, 69 km south-west of Kursk, 12 km south-west of the district center – the town Lgov, 5 km from the selsoviet center – Vyshniye Derevenki.

Climate

Bezhentsev has a warm-summer humid continental climate (Dfb in the Köppen climate classification).

== Transport ==
Bezhentsev is located 8 km from the road of regional importance 38K-017 (Kursk – Lgov – Rylsk – border with Ukraine), 2 km from the road 38K-024 (Lgov – Sudzha), on the road of intermunicipal significance 38Н-447 (38K-024 – Levshinka), 8 km from the nearest railway halt Kolontayevka (railway line 322 km – Lgov I).

The rural locality is situated 76 km from Kursk Vostochny Airport, 137 km from Belgorod International Airport and 278 km from Voronezh Peter the Great Airport.
