= Derevenki, Kursk Oblast =

Rural locality in Kursk Oblast, Russia

Derevenki Деревеньки
- Settlement
- Interactive map of Derevenki
- Location of Derevenki Derevenki (Kursk Oblast)
- Coordinates: 51°31′20″N 35°21′06″E
- Country: Russia
- Federal subject: Kursk Oblast
- Administrative district: Lgovsky District
- SelsovietSelsoviet: Vyshnederevensky

Population (2010 Census)
  - Total: 61
  - Estimate (2010): 61 (0%)

Municipal status
  - Municipal district: Lgovsky Municipal District
  - Rural settlement: Vyshnederevensky Selsoviet Rural Settlement
- Time zone: UTC+3 (MSK)
- Postal code: 307700
- Dialing code: +7 47140
- OKTMO ID: 38622417121
- Website: vishderss.rkursk.ru

Derevenki (Russian: Деревеньки) is a rural locality (a settlement at the railway halt) in Vyshnederevensky Selsoviet Rural Settlement, Lgovsky District, Kursk Oblast, Russia. Population: 61 (2010 census); 97 (2002 census);

== Geography ==
The settlement is located 36 km from the Russia–Ukraine border, 63 km south-west of Kursk, 16 km south-east of the district center – the town Lgov, 6 km from the selsoviet center – Vyshniye Derevenki.

Climate

Derevenki has a warm-summer humid continental climate (Dfb in the Köppen climate classification).

== Transport ==
Derevenki is located 8.5 km from the road of regional importance 38K-017 (Kursk – Lgov – Rylsk – border with Ukraine), 5 km from the road 38K-024 (Lgov – Sudzha), on the road of intermunicipal significance 38Н-443 (38K-024 – Vyshniye Derevenki – Durovo-Bobrik), next to the (closed) railway halt Derevenki (railway line Lgov I — Podkosylev).

The rural locality is situated 70 km from Kursk Vostochny Airport, 129 km from Belgorod International Airport and 270 km from Voronezh Peter the Great Airport.
