= Shaposhnikovo, Lgovsky District, Kursk Oblast =

Rural locality in Kursk Oblast, Russia

Shaposhnikovo Шапошниково
- Village
- Interactive map of Shaposhnikovo
- Location of Shaposhnikovo Shaposhnikovo (Kursk Oblast)
- Coordinates: 51°25′48″N 35°14′59″E
- Country: Russia
- Federal subject: Kursk Oblast
- Administrative district: Lgovsky District
- SelsovietSelsoviet: Vyshnederevensky

Population (2010 Census)
  - Total: 4
  - Estimate (2010): 4 (0%)

Municipal status
  - Municipal district: Lgovsky Municipal District
  - Rural settlement: Vyshnederevensky Selsoviet Rural Settlement
- Time zone: UTC+3 (MSK)
- Postal code: 307730
- Dialing code: +7 47140
- OKTMO ID: 38622417181
- Website: vishderss.rkursk.ru

Shaposhnikovo (Russian: Шапошниково) is a rural locality (Russian: деревня, lit. 'village') in Vyshnederevensky Selsoviet Rural Settlement, Lgovsky District, Kursk Oblast, Russia. Population: 4 (2010 census); 6 (2002 census);

== Geography ==
The village is located on the Malaya Loknya River (a left tributary of the Loknya in the Psel basin), 24 km from the Russia–Ukraine border, 73 km south-west of Kursk, 25.5 km south of the district center – the town Lgov, 15.5 km from the selsoviet center – Vyshniye Derevenki.

Climate

Shaposhnikovo has a warm-summer humid continental climate (Dfb in the Köppen climate classification).

== Transport ==
Shaposhnikovo is located 22 km from the road of regional importance 38K-017 (Kursk – Lgov – Rylsk – border with Ukraine), 1.5 km from the road 38K-024 (Lgov – Sudzha), 16.5 km from the road 38K-030 (Rylsk – Korenevo – Sudzha), 4.5 km from the road of intermunicipal significance 38Н-564 (38K-030 – Kauchuk – 38K-024), 2 km from the nearest (closed) railway halt Anastasyevka (railway line Lgov I — Podkosylev).

The rural locality is situated 80 km from Kursk Vostochny Airport, 127 km from Belgorod International Airport and 279 km from Voronezh Peter the Great Airport.
