= Yablonovy =

Rural locality in Kursk Oblast, Russia

Yablonovy Яблоновый
- Settlement
- Location of Yablonovy
- Location of Yablonovy Yablonovy (Kursk Oblast)
- Coordinates: 51°31′25″N 35°20′47″E
- Country: Russia
- Federal subject: Kursk Oblast
- Administrative district: Lgovsky District
- Selsoviet: Vyshnederevensky

Population (2010 Census)
  - Total: 52

Municipal status
  - Municipal district: Lgovsky Municipal District
  - Rural settlement: Vyshnederevensky Selsoviet Rural Settlement
- Time zone: UTC+3 (MSK)
- Postal code(s): 307700
- Dialing code(s): +7 47140
- OKTMO ID: 38622417156
- Website: vishderss.rkursk.ru

Yablonovy (Russian: Яблоновый) is a rural locality (a settlement) in Vyshnederevensky Selsoviet Rural Settlement, Lgovsky District, Kursk Oblast, Russia. Population: 52 (2010 Census); 94 (2002 Census);

== Geography ==
The settlement is located 36 km from the Russia–Ukraine border, 63 km south-west of Kursk, 17 km south-east of the district center – the town Lgov, 6 km from the selsoviet center – Vyshniye Derevenki.

Climate

Yablonovy has a warm-summer humid continental climate (Dfb in the Köppen climate classification).

== Transport ==
Yablonovy is located 9 km from the road of regional importance 38K-017 (Kursk – Lgov – Rylsk – border with Ukraine), 5 km from the road 38K-024 (Lgov – Sudzha), on the road of intermunicipal significance 38Н-443 (38K-024 – Vyshniye Derevenki – Durovo-Bobrik), 0.5 km from the nearest (closed) railway halt Derevenki (railway line Lgov I — Podkosylev).

The rural locality is situated 63 km from Kursk Vostochny Airport, 129 km from Belgorod International Airport and 271 km from Voronezh Peter the Great Airport.
