= Dyakovka, Lgovsky District, Kursk Oblast =

Rural locality in Kursk Oblast, Russia

Dyakovka Дьяковка
- Village
- Interactive map of Dyakovka
- Location of Dyakovka Dyakovka (Kursk Oblast)
- Coordinates: 51°31′27″N 35°08′04″E
- Country: Russia
- Federal subject: Kursk Oblast
- Administrative district: Lgovsky District
- SelsovietSelsoviet: Vyshnederevensky

Population (2010 Census)
  - Total: 24
  - Estimate (2010): 24 (0%)

Municipal status
  - Municipal district: Lgovsky Municipal District
  - Rural settlement: Vyshnederevensky Selsoviet Rural Settlement
- Time zone: UTC+3 (MSK)
- Postal code: 307740
- Dialing code: +7 47140
- OKTMO ID: 38622417221
- Website: vishderss.rkursk.ru

Dyakovka (Russian: Дьяковка) is a rural locality (Russian: деревня, lit. 'village') in Vyshnederevensky Selsoviet Rural Settlement, Lgovsky District, Kursk Oblast, Russia. Population: 24 (2010 census); 85 (2002 census);

== Geography ==
The village is located on the Krepna River (a left tributary of the Seym), 32 km from the Russia–Ukraine border, 76 km south-west of Kursk, 17.5 km south-west of the district center – the town Lgov, 12.5 km from the selsoviet center – Vyshniye Derevenki.

Climate

Dyakovka has a warm-summer humid continental climate (Dfb in the Köppen climate classification).

== Transport ==
Dyakovka is located 12 km from the road of regional importance 38K-017 (Kursk – Lgov – Rylsk – border with Ukraine), 7.5 km from the road 38K-024 (Lgov – Sudzha), 6.5 km from the road of intermunicipal significance 38Н-447 (38K-024 – Levshinka), 1.5 km from the nearest railway halt 378 km (railway line 322 km – Lgov I).

The rural locality is situated 83 km from Kursk Vostochny Airport, 139 km from Belgorod International Airport and 285 km from Voronezh Peter the Great Airport.
