= Levshinka, Kursk Oblast =

Rural locality in Kursk Oblast, Russia

Levshinka Левшинка
- Village
- Interactive map of Levshinka
- Location of Levshinka Levshinka (Kursk Oblast)
- Coordinates: 51°26′55″N 35°15′05″E
- Country: Russia
- Federal subject: Kursk Oblast
- Administrative district: Lgovsky District
- SelsovietSelsoviet: Vyshnederevensky

Population (2010 Census)
  - Total: 104
  - Estimate (2010): 104 (0%)

Municipal status
  - Municipal district: Lgovsky Municipal District
  - Rural settlement: Vyshnederevensky Selsoviet Rural Settlement
- Time zone: UTC+3 (MSK)
- Postal code: 307730
- Dialing code: +7 47140
- OKTMO ID: 38622417171
- Website: vishderss.rkursk.ru

Levshinka (Russian: Левшинка) is a rural locality (Russian: деревня, lit. 'village') in Vyshnederevensky Selsoviet Rural Settlement, Lgovsky District, Kursk Oblast, Russia. Population: 104 (2010 census); 157 (2002 census);

== Geography ==
The village is located on the Malaya Loknya River (a left tributary of the Loknya in the Psel basin), 26 km from the Russia–Ukraine border, 72 km south-west of Kursk, 23 km south of the district center – the town Lgov, 13 km from the selsoviet center – Vyshniye Derevenki.

Climate

Levshinka has a warm-summer humid continental climate (Dfb in the Köppen climate classification).

== History ==
The settlement of Levshinka was taken over in August 2024, the BBC reported, by the Armed Forces of Ukraine.

== Transport ==
Levshinka is located 20 km from the road of regional importance 38K-017 (Kursk – Lgov – Rylsk – border with Ukraine), 1.5 km from the road 38K-024 (Lgov – Sudzha), 2 km from the nearest (closed) railway halt Anastasyevka (railway line Lgov I — Podkosylev).

The rural locality is situated 79 km from Kursk Vostochny Airport, 128 km from Belgorod International Airport and 279 km from Voronezh Peter the Great Airport.
