= Krasnaya Nov, Lgovsky District, Kursk Oblast =

Rural locality in Kursk Oblast, Russia

Krasnaya Nov Красная Новь
- Village
- Interactive map of Krasnaya Nov
- Location of Krasnaya Nov Krasnaya Nov (Kursk Oblast)
- Coordinates: 51°36′09″N 35°16′38″E
- Country: Russia
- Federal subject: Kursk Oblast
- Administrative district: Lgovsky District
- SelsovietSelsoviet: Vyshnederevensky

Population (2010 Census)
  - Total: 43
  - Estimate (2010): 43 (0%)

Municipal status
  - Municipal district: Lgovsky Municipal District
  - Rural settlement: Vyshnederevensky Selsoviet Rural Settlement
- Time zone: UTC+3 (MSK)
- Postal code: 307701
- Dialing code: +7 47140
- OKTMO ID: 38622417146
- Website: vishderss.rkursk.ru

Krasnaya Nov (Russian: Красная Новь) is a rural locality (Russian: деревня, lit. 'village') in Vyshnederevensky Selsoviet Rural Settlement, Lgovsky District, Kursk Oblast, Russia. Population: 43 (2010 census); 45 (2002 census);

== Geography ==
The village is located on the Byk River (a left tributary of the Seym), 42.5 km from the Russia–Ukraine border, 65 km south-west of Kursk, 6.5 km south-east of the district center – the town Lgov, 4.5 km from the selsoviet center – Vyshniye Derevenki.

Climate

Krasnaya Nov has a warm-summer humid continental climate (Dfb in the Köppen climate classification).

Climate data for Krasnaya Nov
Month	Jan	Feb	Mar	Apr	May	Jun	Jul	Aug	Sep	Oct	Nov	Dec	Year
Mean daily maximum °C (°F)	−3.8 (25.2)	−2.8 (27.0)	3.1 (37.6)	13.2 (55.8)	19.4 (66.9)	22.7 (72.9)	25.2 (77.4)	24.6 (76.3)	18.3 (64.9)	10.7 (51.3)	3.6 (38.5)	−0.9 (30.4)	11.1 (52.0)
Daily mean °C (°F)	−5.9 (21.4)	−5.4 (22.3)	−0.5 (31.1)	8.4 (47.1)	14.8 (58.6)	18.4 (65.1)	20.9 (69.6)	20 (68)	14.1 (57.4)	7.4 (45.3)	1.4 (34.5)	−2.9 (26.8)	7.6 (45.6)
Mean daily minimum °C (°F)	−8.4 (16.9)	−8.5 (16.7)	−4.7 (23.5)	2.9 (37.2)	9.1 (48.4)	13 (55)	15.8 (60.4)	14.8 (58.6)	9.8 (49.6)	4 (39)	−0.9 (30.4)	−5.1 (22.8)	3.5 (38.2)
Average precipitation mm (inches)	51 (2.0)	44 (1.7)	48 (1.9)	50 (2.0)	63 (2.5)	71 (2.8)	76 (3.0)	53 (2.1)	57 (2.2)	57 (2.2)	47 (1.9)	49 (1.9)	666 (26.2)
Source: https://en.climate-data.org/asia/russian-federation/kursk-oblast/krasnaya-nov-654111/

== Transport ==
Krasnaya Nov is located 2.5 km from the road of regional importance 38K-017 (Kursk – Lgov – Rylsk – border with Ukraine), 1.5 km from the road 38K-024 (Lgov – Sudzha), 2.5 km from the nearest (closed) railway halt Sugrov (railway line Lgov I — Podkosylev).

The rural locality is situated 72 km from Kursk Vostochny Airport, 139 km from Belgorod International Airport and 274 km from Voronezh Peter the Great Airport.
