= Volzhin (khutor) =

Rural locality in Kursk Oblast, Russia

Volzhin Волжин
- Khutor
- Interactive map of Volzhin
- Location of Volzhin Volzhin (Kursk Oblast)
- Coordinates: 51°13′12″N 35°11′45″E
- Country: Russia
- Federal subject: Kursk Oblast
- Administrative district: Lgovsky District
- SelsovietSelsoviet: Vyshnederevensky

Population (2010 Census)
  - Total: 0
  - Estimate (2010): 0 )

Municipal status
  - Municipal district: Lgovsky Municipal District
  - Rural settlement: Vyshnederevensky Selsoviet Rural Settlement
- Time zone: UTC+3 (MSK)
- Postal code: 307745
- Dialing code: +7 47140
- OKTMO ID: 38622417216
- Website: vishderss.rkursk.ru

Volzhin (Russian: Волжин) is a rural locality (a khutor) in Vyshnederevensky Selsoviet Rural Settlement, Lgovsky District, Kursk Oblast, Russia. Population: 0 (2010 census); 22 (2002 census);

== Geography ==
The khutor is located on the Apoka River (a left tributary of the Seym), 33 km from the Russia–Ukraine border, 73 km south-west of Kursk, 15 km south-west of the district center – the town Lgov, 8.5 km from the selsoviet center – Vyshniye Derevenki.

Climate

Volzhin has a warm-summer humid continental climate (Dfb in the Köppen climate classification).

== Transport ==
Volzhin is located 12 km from the road of regional importance 38K-017 (Kursk – Lgov – Rylsk – border with Ukraine), 3.5 km from the road 38K-024 (Lgov – Sudzha), 3 km from the road of intermunicipal significance 38Н-447 (38K-024 – Levshinka), 5.5 km from the nearest railway halt 378 km (railway line 322 km – Lgov I).

The rural locality is situated 80 km from Kursk Vostochny Airport, 136 km from Belgorod International Airport and 281 km from Voronezh Peter the Great Airport.
