= Kromskiye Byki =

Rural locality in Kursk Oblast, Russia

Kromskiye Byki Кромские Быки
- Selo
- Interactive map of Kromskiye Byki
- Location of Kromskiye Byki Kromskiye Byki (Kursk Oblast)
- Coordinates: 51°29′19″N 35°16′37″E
- Country: Russia
- Federal subject: Kursk Oblast
- Administrative district: Lgovsky District
- SelsovietSelsoviet: Vyshnederevensky

Population (2010 Census)
  - Total: 307
  - Estimate (2010): 307 (0%)

Municipal status
  - Municipal district: Lgovsky Municipal District
  - Rural settlement: Vyshnederevensky Selsoviet Rural Settlement
- Time zone: UTC+3 (MSK)
- Postal code: 307710
- Dialing code: +7 47140
- OKTMO ID: 38622417161
- Website: vishderss.rkursk.ru

Kromskiye Byki (Russian: Кромские Быки) is a rural locality (Russian: село, lit. 'village') in Vyshnederevensky Selsoviet Rural Settlement, Lgovsky District, Kursk Oblast, Russia. Population: 307 (2010 census); 351 (2002 census);

== Geography ==
The village is located in the Byk River basin (a left tributary of the Seym), 30.5 km from the Russia–Ukraine border, 69 km south-west of Kursk, 19 km south-east of the district center – the town Lgov, 8 km from the selsoviet center – Vyshniye Derevenki.

Climate

Kromskiye Byki has a warm-summer humid continental climate (Dfb in the Köppen climate classification).

Climate data for Kromskiye Byki
Month	Jan	Feb	Mar	Apr	May	Jun	Jul	Aug	Sep	Oct	Nov	Dec	Year
Mean daily maximum °C (°F)	−3.8 (25.2)	−2.7 (27.1)	3.2 (37.8)	13.1 (55.6)	19.3 (66.7)	22.6 (72.7)	25.1 (77.2)	24.5 (76.1)	18.2 (64.8)	10.7 (51.3)	3.6 (38.5)	−0.9 (30.4)	11.1 (52.0)
Daily mean °C (°F)	−5.9 (21.4)	−5.3 (22.5)	−0.5 (31.1)	8.3 (46.9)	14.7 (58.5)	18.3 (64.9)	20.8 (69.4)	19.9 (67.8)	14 (57)	7.3 (45.1)	1.4 (34.5)	−2.9 (26.8)	7.5 (45.5)
Mean daily minimum °C (°F)	−8.3 (17.1)	−8.5 (16.7)	−4.7 (23.5)	2.8 (37.0)	9 (48)	13 (55)	15.7 (60.3)	14.8 (58.6)	9.7 (49.5)	4 (39)	−0.9 (30.4)	−5.1 (22.8)	3.5 (38.2)
Average precipitation mm (inches)	51 (2.0)	44 (1.7)	48 (1.9)	50 (2.0)	63 (2.5)	71 (2.8)	76 (3.0)	53 (2.1)	57 (2.2)	57 (2.2)	47 (1.9)	49 (1.9)	666 (26.2)
Source: https://en.climate-data.org/asia/russian-federation/kursk-oblast/кромские-быки-508268/

== Transport ==
Kromskiye Byki is located on the road of regional importance 38K-024 (Lgov – Sudzha), on the road of intermunicipal significance 38Н-564 (38K-030 – Kauchuk – 38K-024), 2.5 km from the nearest (closed) railway halt 25 km (railway line Lgov I — Podkosylev).

The rural locality is situated 75.5 km from Kursk Vostochny Airport, 130 km from Belgorod International Airport and 275 km from Voronezh Peter the Great Airport.
