= Karasevka, Lgovsky District, Kursk Oblast =

Rural locality in Kursk Oblast, Russia

Karasevka Карасевка
- Village
- Interactive map of Karasevka
- Location of Karasevka Karasevka (Kursk Oblast)
- Coordinates: 51°36′52″N 35°16′29″E
- Country: Russia
- Federal subject: Kursk Oblast
- Administrative district: Lgovsky District
- SelsovietSelsoviet: Bolsheugonsky

Population (2010 Census)
  - Total: 126
  - Estimate (2010): 126 (0%)

Municipal status
  - Municipal district: Lgovsky Municipal District
  - Rural settlement: Bolsheugonsky Selsoviet Rural Settlement
- Time zone: UTC+3 (MSK)
- Postal code: 307751
- Dialing code: +7 47140
- OKTMO ID: 38622410111
- Website: b-ugoni.ru

Karasevka (Russian: Карасевка) is a rural locality (Russian: деревня, lit. 'village') in Bolsheugonsky Selsoviet Rural Settlement, Lgovsky District, Kursk Oblast, Russia. Population: 126 (2010 census); 134 (2002 census);

== Geography ==
The village is located on the Byk River (a left tributary of the Seym), 44 km from the Russia–Ukraine border, 65 km south-west of Kursk, 1 km south of the district center – the town Lgov, 10 km from the selsoviet center – Bolshiye Ugony.

Climate

Karasevka has a warm-summer humid continental climate (Dfb in the Köppen climate classification).

Climate data for Karasevka
Month	Jan	Feb	Mar	Apr	May	Jun	Jul	Aug	Sep	Oct	Nov	Dec	Year
Mean daily maximum °C (°F)	−3.8 (25.2)	−2.8 (27.0)	3.1 (37.6)	13.2 (55.8)	19.4 (66.9)	22.7 (72.9)	25.2 (77.4)	24.6 (76.3)	18.3 (64.9)	10.7 (51.3)	3.6 (38.5)	−0.9 (30.4)	11.1 (52.0)
Daily mean °C (°F)	−5.9 (21.4)	−5.4 (22.3)	−0.5 (31.1)	8.4 (47.1)	14.8 (58.6)	18.4 (65.1)	20.9 (69.6)	20 (68)	14.1 (57.4)	7.4 (45.3)	1.4 (34.5)	−2.9 (26.8)	7.6 (45.6)
Mean daily minimum °C (°F)	−8.4 (16.9)	−8.5 (16.7)	−4.7 (23.5)	2.9 (37.2)	9.1 (48.4)	13 (55)	15.8 (60.4)	14.8 (58.6)	9.8 (49.6)	4 (39)	−0.9 (30.4)	−5.1 (22.8)	3.5 (38.2)
Average precipitation mm (inches)	51 (2.0)	44 (1.7)	48 (1.9)	50 (2.0)	63 (2.5)	71 (2.8)	76 (3.0)	53 (2.1)	57 (2.2)	57 (2.2)	47 (1.9)	49 (1.9)	666 (26.2)
Source: https://en.climate-data.org/asia/russian-federation/kursk-oblast/карасевка-654000/

== Transport ==
Karasevka is located 1 km from the road of regional importance 38K-017 (Kursk – Lgov – Rylsk – border with Ukraine) as part of the European route E38, 1 km from the road 38K-024 (Lgov – Sudzha), 2 km from the nearest railway station Lgov I (Lgov-Kiyevsky) (railway lines: Lgov I — Podkosylev, 322 km – Lgov I, Lgov I – Kursk and Navlya – Lgov I).

The rural locality is situated 71.5 km from Kursk Vostochny Airport, 140 km from Belgorod International Airport and 274 km from Voronezh Peter the Great Airport.
