= Volzhin =

Volzhin may refer to:

- Volzhin (khutor), a rural locality in Kursk Oblast, Russia
- Alexander Nikolaevich Volzhin (1860–1933), Russian statesman and first governor of Kholm Governorate
- Alexander Volzhin (chess player) (born 1971), Russian chess grandmaster
