= Cheremoshki, Lgovsky District, Kursk Oblast =

Rural locality in Kursk Oblast, Russia

Cheremoshki Черемошки
- Selo
- Interactive map of Cheremoshki
- Location of Cheremoshki Cheremoshki (Kursk Oblast)
- Coordinates: 51°30′56″N 35°16′23″E
- Country: Russia
- Federal subject: Kursk Oblast
- Administrative district: Lgovsky District
- SelsovietSelsoviet: Vyshnederevensky

Population (2010 Census)
  - Total: 301
  - Estimate (2010): 301 (0%)

Municipal status
  - Municipal district: Lgovsky Municipal District
  - Rural settlement: Vyshnederevensky Selsoviet Rural Settlement
- Time zone: UTC+3 (MSK)
- Postal code: 307704
- Dialing code: +7 47140
- OKTMO ID: 38622417151
- Website: vishderss.rkursk.ru

Cheremoshki (Russian: Черемошки) is a rural locality (Russian: село, lit. 'village') in Vyshnederevensky Selsoviet Rural Settlement, Lgovsky District, Kursk Oblast, Russia. Population: 301 (2010 census); 339 (2002 census);

== Geography ==
The village is located on the Byk River (a left tributary of the Seym), 33 km from the Russia–Ukraine border, 68 km south-west of Kursk, 15 km south-east of the district center – the town Lgov, 5 km from the selsoviet center – Vyshniye Derevenki.

Climate

Cheremoshki has a warm-summer humid continental climate (Dfb in the Köppen climate classification).

Climate data for Cheremoshki
Month	Jan	Feb	Mar	Apr	May	Jun	Jul	Aug	Sep	Oct	Nov	Dec	Year
Mean daily maximum °C (°F)	−3.8 (25.2)	−2.7 (27.1)	3.2 (37.8)	13.1 (55.6)	19.3 (66.7)	22.6 (72.7)	25.1 (77.2)	24.5 (76.1)	18.2 (64.8)	10.7 (51.3)	3.6 (38.5)	−0.9 (30.4)	11.1 (52.0)
Daily mean °C (°F)	−5.9 (21.4)	−5.3 (22.5)	−0.5 (31.1)	8.3 (46.9)	14.7 (58.5)	18.3 (64.9)	20.8 (69.4)	19.9 (67.8)	14 (57)	7.3 (45.1)	1.4 (34.5)	−2.9 (26.8)	7.5 (45.5)
Mean daily minimum °C (°F)	−8.3 (17.1)	−8.5 (16.7)	−4.7 (23.5)	2.8 (37.0)	9 (48)	13 (55)	15.7 (60.3)	14.8 (58.6)	9.7 (49.5)	4 (39)	−0.9 (30.4)	−5.1 (22.8)	3.5 (38.2)
Average precipitation mm (inches)	51 (2.0)	44 (1.7)	48 (1.9)	50 (2.0)	63 (2.5)	71 (2.8)	76 (3.0)	53 (2.1)	57 (2.2)	57 (2.2)	47 (1.9)	49 (1.9)	666 (26.2)

== Transport ==
Cheremoshki is located on the road of regional importance 38K-024 (Lgov – Sudzha), on the road of intermunicipal significance 38Н-455 (38K-024 – Cheremoshki – Vyshniye Derevenki), 5 km from the nearest (closed) railway halt Derevenki (railway line Lgov I — Podkosylev).

The rural locality is situated 75 km from Kursk Vostochny Airport, 132 km from Belgorod International Airport and 276 km from Voronezh Peter the Great Airport.
