= Zinaida Troitskaya =

Female locomotive driver in the USSR

- Зинаида Петровна Троицкая
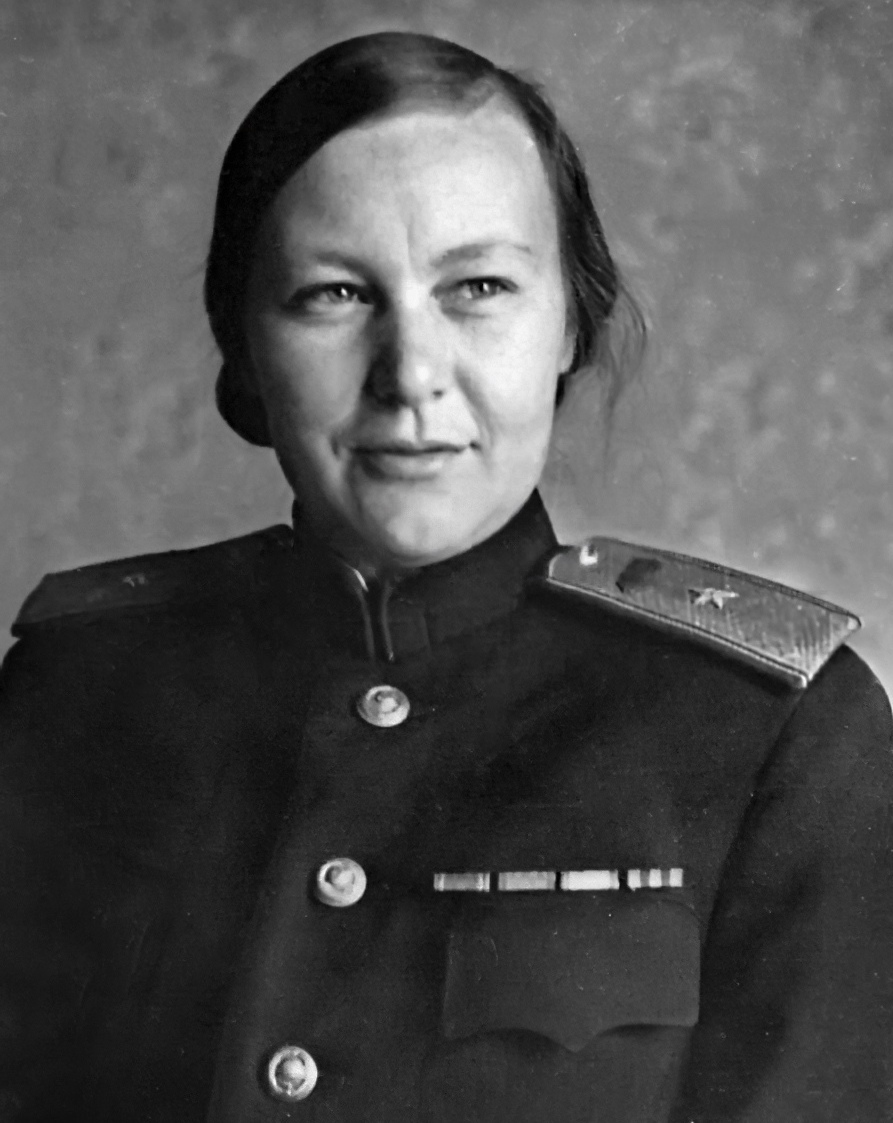
- Born: 1913; Moscow, Russian Empire
- Died: 1981; Moscow, USSR
- Citizenship: Soviet Union
- Awards: Order of Lenin (2)

Zinaida Petrovna Troitskaya (Russian: Зинаида Петровна Троицкая; 1913 — 1981) was the first female locomotive driver in the USSR. She went on to become the deputy head of the Moscow Metro.

== Early life ==
Troitskaya was born in 1913 to a Russian family in Moscow. Her father was a railway worker and she always had respect for the profession, but at the time it was considered a job for males only. She completed high school when she was fifteen, but because she could not enter college until she was seventeen, her father suggested that she instead attend the railway apprentice factory school of the Kazan railway.

== Rail career ==
While working at the railway she admitted to courses for assistant locomotive drivers in 1930 and passed the tests, and in 1931 she because the first female assistant locomotive driver. Subsequently, in 1935 she became the first female head locomotive driver. The rest of her crew on her first drive as head locomotive driver were women, with of Anna Koshkina as the assistant driver and Mariya Fedosova as fireman. In April 1936 she was awarded the Order of Lenin for her work. That year she married a fellow rail worker and later they had a daughter named Alla.

In 1937 she was appointed deputy head of the Moscow-Sortirovochnaya depot, and later that year she became the head of the Moscow Circuit Railway, making her the first woman to head a regional railway. She was promoted to the title of director-general.

Over time she gained fame, not only for being the first female locomotive driver, but also for encouraging other women to follow in her footsteps In 1938 she organized the first women's locomotive brigade. Many other Soviet women including Yelena Chukhnyuk and Basharat Mirbabayeva followed in her footsteps. Her accomplishments were frequently mention in the Gudok newspaper, and posters containing her picture were used to recruit other women rail workers to become locomotive drivers.

In 1941 she refused evacuation away from the frontlines of the war despite being pregnant, and worked around the clock to provide rail services to support the war effort. During the war she was tasked with providing deliveries of coal to Moscow. In 1944 she became the deputy head of the Moscow Metro, a position she held until retiring in 1974.

She died in Moscow in 1981.

== See also ==
- Anna Shchetinina
- Praskovya Angelina

== Literature ==
- Troitskaya, Zinaida (1939). "Всі шляхи!". Smena (in Ukrainian) (11): 27.
- "Речь начальника Московской-окружной железной дороги Зинаиды Троицкой". Izvestiya (in Russian). 9 September 1941. p. 3.
- Troitskaya, Zinaida (1948). "Women Who Work". Soviet Information Bulletin. 8 (5): 138.
- "Первая женщина — начальник железной дороги". Vechernyaya Moskva (in Russian). 4 November 1938. p. 1.
- "Заботливо выращивать новые кадры". Komsomolskaya Pravda (in Russian). 9 April 1939. p. 1.
