= Yelena Chukhnyuk =

- Елена Чухнюк
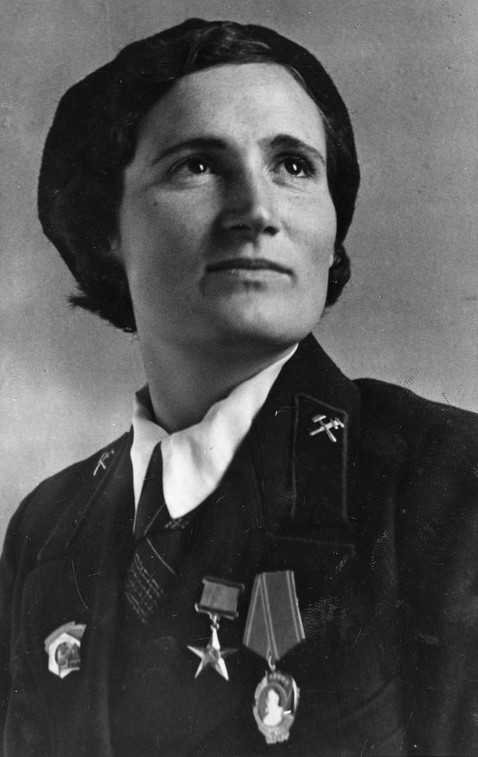
- Chukhnyuk, c. 1940s
- Born: March 12, 1917; Dyakovka, Bershad district, Russian Empire
- Died: May 10, 2014 (aged 97); Moscow, Russia
- Resting place: Troyekurovskoye Cemetery
- Citizenship: Soviet Union; Russia
- Occupations: Wartime locomotive driver, politician
- Years active: c. 1938—1981
- Known for: Bringing supplies to the Eastern Front, particularly to the battles of Stalingrad and Kursk
- Awards: Hero of Socialist Labor; Honorary Railwayman; Order of Lenin

Yelena Mirovna Chukhnyuk, also spelled Elena, was a Ukrainian-born Soviet locomotive driver and Hero of Socialist Labor. One of the first women to be involved in the Soviet rail industry, Chukhnyuk was widely known for completing complex transport missions to locations across the Eastern Front during the Second World War; for these, she became highly decorated.

Following the war, Chukhnyuk became a deputy of the Supreme Soviet, representing the Gomel region. She served during the 1946 to 1950 term, and was a member of the Soviet of the Union, the lower chamber of the legislature.

== Early life and career ==
Yelena Mironovna Chukhnyuk was born on March 12, 1917, to a peasant family in the small village of Dyakovka. Hailing from the Bershad district of present-day Ukraine, Chukhnyuk completed secondary school before moving to the Gomel region of the Byelorussian SSR in 1938.

Women were previously disallowed from becoming railroad workers (due to the numerous health risks), yet in 1938 the restriction was lifted. Chukhnyuk therefore began to study core fundamentals: driving, switch operating, and track fitting, among others. After completing the course she became an assistant locomotive driver, and very quickly after that, a full locomotive driver in her own right.

Her first assignments were to transport cargo —via heavy train— from the Gomel depot to the cities of Orsha, Mogilev, and Chernihiv. In 1941, Chukhnyuk became an Honorary Railwayman, a distinction reserved for exemplary workers.

== World War II ==
During Summer of 1942, the 25-year-old Chukhnyuk was in charge of the steam locomotive Em723-88, its two crews, and an allocated turntable. The team was assigned to the newly—formed Locomotive column no. 4 of the special reserve, based out of the Moscow-Kyivskaya station, and was under command of the People's Commissariat of Communication Routes.

Later that year, while leading an equipment train to Stalingrad, Chukhnyuk's convoy was attacked by a Nazi bombing run. She received a shrapnel wound to the leg, and managed to complete the route with the assistance of her team. Subsequently, Chukhnyuk's train supplied ammunition to forces in various theaters of the Great Patriotic War, including Stalingrad, Kursk, and the Dnieper. In the Winter of 1943–1944, Chukhnyuk's train delivered crucial coal shipments during extreme frosts. She would work for five days on end, rotating shifts with her team, to complete shipments from Vorkuta to Moscow.

== Postwar life ==
Following the war, Chukhnyuk graduated from the Russian University of Transport, and accepted a job in the government ministry of transport. She was also elected to be a Deputy of the Supreme Soviet (representing the Gomel region of the Byelorussian SSR), and served from 1946 to 1950. She retired from locomotive driving in 1981.

Yelena Chukhnyuk died on May 10, 2014, in Moscow. She is buried in the Troyekurovsky Cemetery.

== Awards and distinctions ==
- Honorary Railwayman (1941)
- Hero of Socialist Labor (1943)
- Order of Lenin (1943)
- Jubilee Medal "65 Years of Victory in the Great Patriotic War 1941—1945" (2009)
