= Bolshiye Ugony =

Rural locality in Kursk Oblast, Russia

Bolshiye Ugony Большие Угоны
- Selo
- Interactive map of Bolshiye Ugony
- Location of Bolshiye Ugony Bolshiye Ugony (Kursk Oblast)
- Coordinates: 51°35′31″N 35°24′46″E
- Country: Russia
- Federal subject: Kursk Oblast
- Administrative district: Lgovsky District
- SelsovietSelsoviet: Bolsheugonsky

Population (2010 Census)
  - Total: 722
  - Estimate (2010): 722 (0%)

Administrative status
  - Capital of: Bolsheugonsky Selsoviet

Municipal status
  - Municipal district: Lgovsky Municipal District
  - Rural settlement: Bolsheugonsky Selsoviet Rural Settlement
  - Capital of: Bolsheugonsky Selsoviet Rural Settlement
- Time zone: UTC+3 (MSK)
- Postal code: 307715
- Dialing code: +7 47140
- OKTMO ID: 38622410101
- Website: b-ugoni.ru

Bolshiye Ugony (Russian: Большие Угоны) is a rural locality (Russian: село, lit. 'village') and the administrative center of Bolsheugonsky Selsoviet Rural Settlement, Lgovsky District, Kursk Oblast, Russia. Population: 722 (2010 census); 895 (2002 census);

== Geography ==
The village is located on the Seym River, 46 km from the Russia–Ukraine border, 55 km south-west of Kursk, 12 km south-east of the district center – the town Lgov.

Climate

Bolshiye Ugony has a warm-summer humid continental climate (Dfb in the Köppen climate classification).

Climate data for Bolshiye Ugony
| Month | Jan | Feb | Mar | Apr | May | Jun | Jul | Aug | Sep | Oct | Nov | Dec | Year |
|---|---|---|---|---|---|---|---|---|---|---|---|---|---|
| Mean daily maximum °C (°F) | −3.9 (25.0) | −2.8 (27.0) | 3.1 (37.6) | 13.2 (55.8) | 19.5 (67.1) | 22.8 (73.0) | 25.3 (77.5) | 24.6 (76.3) | 18.3 (64.9) | 10.7 (51.3) | 3.6 (38.5) | −1 (30) | 11.1 (52.0) |
| Daily mean °C (°F) | −5.9 (21.4) | −5.4 (22.3) | −0.5 (31.1) | 8.4 (47.1) | 14.8 (58.6) | 18.4 (65.1) | 21 (70) | 20 (68) | 14.1 (57.4) | 7.4 (45.3) | 1.3 (34.3) | −2.9 (26.8) | 7.6 (45.6) |
| Mean daily minimum °C (°F) | −8.4 (16.9) | −8.5 (16.7) | −4.7 (23.5) | 2.9 (37.2) | 9.2 (48.6) | 13.1 (55.6) | 15.9 (60.6) | 14.9 (58.8) | 9.8 (49.6) | 4 (39) | −1 (30) | −5.1 (22.8) | 3.5 (38.3) |
| Average precipitation mm (inches) | 51 (2.0) | 44 (1.7) | 48 (1.9) | 50 (2.0) | 63 (2.5) | 70 (2.8) | 74 (2.9) | 54 (2.1) | 57 (2.2) | 57 (2.2) | 47 (1.9) | 49 (1.9) | 664 (26.1) |
Source: https://en.climate-data.org/asia/russian-federation/kursk-oblast/большие-угоны-498598/

== Transport ==
Bolshiye Ugony is located on the road of regional importance 38K-017 (Kursk – Lgov – Rylsk – border with Ukraine) as part of the European route E38, on the roads of intermunicipal significance 38H-359 (38K-017 – Malyye Ugony – Pogorelovka) and 38H-378 (38K-017 – Emmanuilovka – Stremoukhovo-Bobrik). There is a railway halt 408 km (railway line Lgov I — Kursk).

The rural locality is situated 62 km from Kursk Vostochny Airport, 132 km from Belgorod International Airport and 264 km from Voronezh Peter the Great Airport.
