= Levshinka, Kursk Oblast, selo =

Rural locality in Kursk Oblast, Russia

Levshinka Левшинка
- Selo
- Interactive map of Levshinka
- Location of Levshinka Levshinka (Kursk Oblast)
- Coordinates: 51°32′21″N 35°13′20″E
- Country: Russia
- Federal subject: Kursk Oblast
- Administrative district: Lgovsky District
- SelsovietSelsoviet: Vyshnederevensky

Population (2010 Census)
  - Total: 176
  - Estimate (2010): 176 (0%)

Municipal status
  - Municipal district: Lgovsky Municipal District
  - Rural settlement: Vyshnederevensky Selsoviet Rural Settlement
- Time zone: UTC+3 (MSK)
- Postal code: 307745
- Dialing code: +7 47140
- OKTMO ID: 38622417231
- Website: vishderss.rkursk.ru

Levshinka (Russian: Левшинка) is a rural locality (Russian: село, lit. 'village') in Vyshnederevensky Selsoviet Rural Settlement, Lgovsky District, Kursk Oblast, Russia. Population: 176 (2010 census); 249 (2002 census);

== Geography ==
The village is located on the Apoka River (a left tributary of the Seym), 35 km from the Russia–Ukraine border, 70 km south-west of Kursk, 13 km south-west of the district center – the town Lgov, 6 km from the selsoviet center – Vyshniye Derevenki.

Climate

Levshinka has a warm-summer humid continental climate (Dfb in the Köppen climate classification).

Climate data for Levshinka
Month	Jan	Feb	Mar	Apr	May	Jun	Jul	Aug	Sep	Oct	Nov	Dec	Year
Mean daily maximum °C (°F)	−3.8 (25.2)	−2.7 (27.1)	3.2 (37.8)	13.1 (55.6)	19.3 (66.7)	22.6 (72.7)	25.1 (77.2)	24.5 (76.1)	18.2 (64.8)	10.7 (51.3)	3.7 (38.7)	−0.9 (30.4)	11.1 (52.0)
Daily mean °C (°F)	−5.8 (21.6)	−5.3 (22.5)	−0.5 (31.1)	8.2 (46.8)	14.6 (58.3)	18.3 (64.9)	20.8 (69.4)	19.9 (67.8)	14 (57)	7.3 (45.1)	1.4 (34.5)	−2.9 (26.8)	7.5 (45.5)
Mean daily minimum °C (°F)	−8.3 (17.1)	−8.5 (16.7)	−4.7 (23.5)	2.7 (36.9)	9 (48)	12.9 (55.2)	15.7 (60.3)	14.7 (58.5)	9.7 (49.5)	4 (39)	−0.9 (30.4)	−5.1 (22.8)	3.4 (38.2)
Average precipitation mm (inches)	51 (2.0)	44 (1.7)	48 (1.9)	50 (2.0)	63 (2.5)	71 (2.8)	76 (3.0)	53 (2.1)	57 (2.2)	57 (2.2)	47 (1.9)	49 (1.9)	666 (26.2)
Source: https://en.climate-data.org/asia/russian-federation/kursk-oblast/левшинка-653918/

== Transport ==
Levshinka is located 10 km from the road of regional importance 38K-017 (Kursk – Lgov – Rylsk – border with Ukraine), 2 km from the road 38K-024 (Lgov – Sudzha), on the road of intermunicipal significance 38Н-447 (38K-024 – Levshinka), 7 km from the nearest railway halt Kolontayevka (railway line 322 km – Lgov I).

The rural locality is situated 78 km from Kursk Vostochny Airport, 137 km from Belgorod International Airport and 279 km from Voronezh Peter the Great Airport.
