= Stremoukhovo-Bobrik =

Rural locality in Kursk Oblast, Russia

Stremoukhovo-Bobrik Стремоухово-Бобрик
- Selo
- Interactive map of Stremoukhovo-Bobrik
- Location of Stremoukhovo-Bobrik Stremoukhovo-Bobrik (Kursk Oblast)
- Coordinates: 51°30′11″N 35°27′16″E
- Country: Russia
- Federal subject: Kursk Oblast
- Administrative district: Lgovsky District
- SelsovietSelsoviet: Vyshnederevensky

Population (2010 Census)
  - Total: 140
  - Estimate (2010): 140 (0%)

Municipal status
  - Municipal district: Lgovsky Municipal District
  - Rural settlement: Vyshnederevensky Selsoviet Rural Settlement
- Time zone: UTC+3 (MSK)
- Postal code: 307703
- Dialing code: +7 47140
- OKTMO ID: 38622417136
- Website: vishderss.rkursk.ru

Stremoukhovo-Bobrik (Russian: Стремоухово-Бобрик) is a rural locality (Russian: село, lit. 'village') in Vyshnederevensky Selsoviet Rural Settlement, Lgovsky District, Kursk Oblast, Russia. Population: 140 (2010 census); 266 (2002 census);

== Geography ==
The village is located on the Bobrik River (a left tributary of the Reut River in the Seym basin), 38 km from the Russia–Ukraine border, 56 km south-west of Kursk, 22 km south-east of the district center – the town Lgov, 12 km from the selsoviet center – Vyshniye Derevenki.

Climate

Stremoukhovo-Bobrik has a warm-summer humid continental climate (Dfb in the Köppen climate classification).

== Transport ==
Stremoukhovo-Bobrik is located 10.5 km from the road of regional importance 38K-017 (Kursk – Lgov – Rylsk – border with Ukraine), 11 km from the road 38K-024 (Lgov – Sudzha), 3 km from the road of intermunicipal significance 38Н-443 (38K-024 – Vyshniye Derevenki – Durovo-Bobrik), on the road 38Н-444 (38N-443 – Stremoukhovo-Bobrik – border with Kurchatovsky District), 7 km from the nearest (closed) railway halt Derevenki (railway line Lgov I — Podkosylev).

The rural locality is situated 64 km from Kursk Vostochny Airport, 122 km from Belgorod International Airport and 263 km from Voronezh Peter the Great Airport.
