= Honorary Railwayman =

Honorary Railwayman of Russia
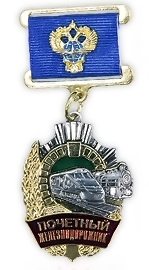
- Awarded for: Exceptional contributions to the development and safety of railway transportation in Russia
- Sponsored by: Ministry of Transport
- Country: Russia
- First award: 1934

Precedence
- Next (higher): Badge of Honour "Honoured Worker of Transport of Russia"
- Next (lower): Certificate of Honour of the Ministry of Transport of Russia

Honorary Railwayman (Russian: Почётный железнодорожник) is one of the state awards of Russia, established on May 13, 1933 during the Soviet period, by the Central Executive Committee of the Soviet Union to reward railway transport workers.

Railway workers and others are awarded for achieving the highest and most consistent results in railway labor; for preparation, development, and implementation efforts; for improving the functioning of railway transport; for selfless actions related to ensuring the safety of train movements; for the application of achievements in science, technology, and new technologies; and for the preservation of passengers' lives, cargo, freight, and other entrusted property.

== History ==
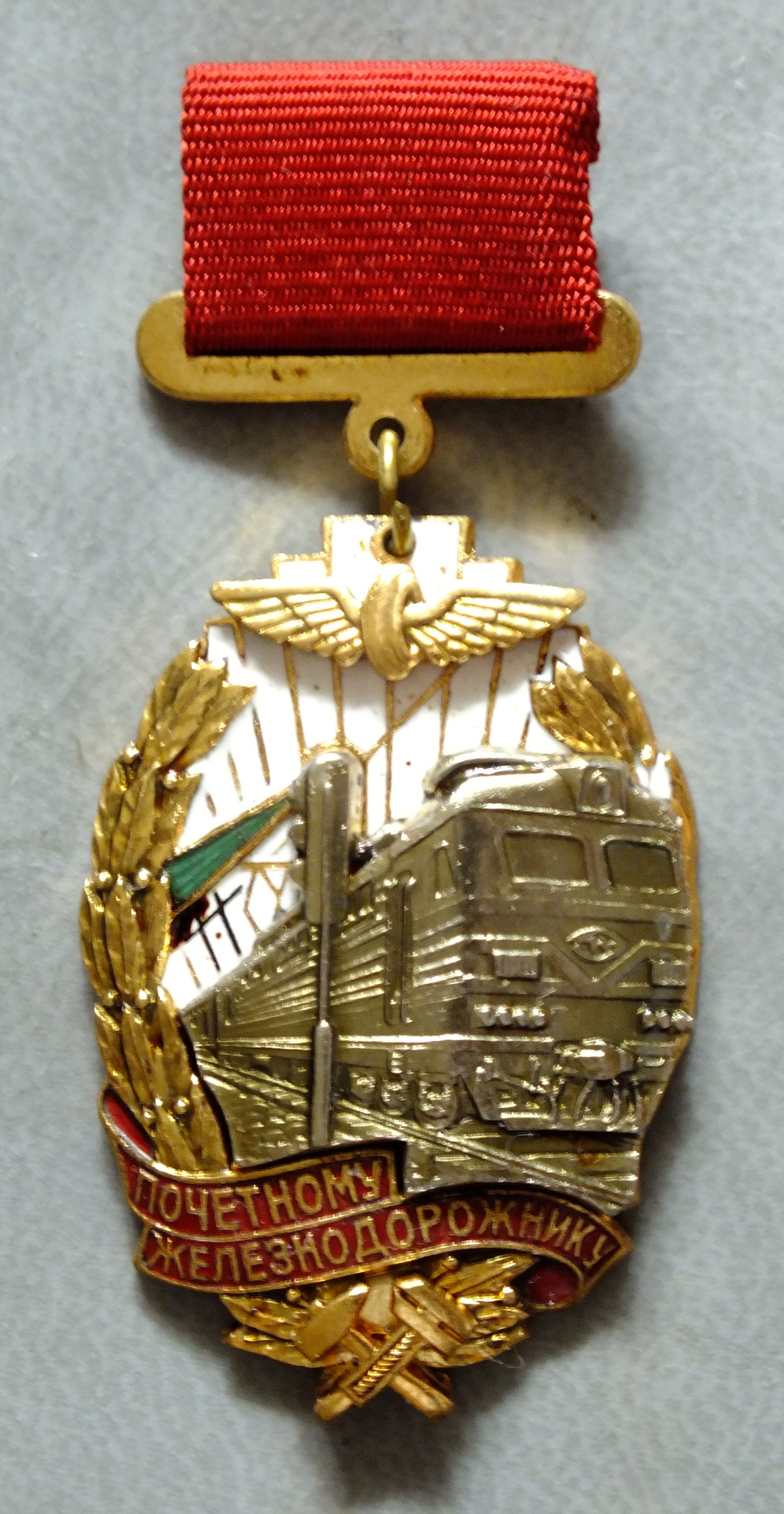
Soviet version of the badge

The award, originally established on May 17, 1934, was initially called the "Badge of Honorary Railwayman." Since 1964, it became known as the "Honorary Railwayman Badge".

In the 1980s and 1990s, railway workers were awarded the "Honorary Railwayman" badge, which depicted the VL85 electric locomotive.

By order of the Ministry of Railways dated April 22, 2002, the award was renamed to the "Honorary Railwayman" badge . In 2002, the design of the badge also changed (see image on the right): the badge's shape was modified, and it featured a steam locomotive and the high-speed "Sokol" electric train (as of 2015, only a prototype of the train existed).

Individuals awarded the "Honorary Railwayman" badge receive several privileges. For example, awarded railway workers are entitled to free travel in luxury (SV) train cars if they are still employed in the industry or have retired .

The badge with number 1 was awarded to the railway innovator Semyon Vasilyevich Kutafin for developing a new system for coupling and uncoupling railcars, organizing the work of conductors and station attendants, and other innovations implemented across all railways in the USSR .
