= Rechitsa, Kursk Oblast =

Rural locality in Kursk Oblast, Russia

Rechitsa Речица
- Selo
- Interactive map of Rechitsa
- Location of Rechitsa Rechitsa (Kursk Oblast)
- Coordinates: 51°41′43″N 35°25′59″E
- Country: Russia
- Federal subject: Kursk Oblast
- Administrative district: Lgovsky District
- SelsovietSelsoviet: Gorodensky

Population (2010 Census)
  - Total: 68
  - Estimate (2010): 68 (0%)

Municipal status
  - Municipal district: Lgovsky Municipal District
  - Rural settlement: Gorodensky Selsoviet Rural Settlement
- Time zone: UTC+3 (MSK)
- Postal code: 307735
- Dialing code: +7 47140
- OKTMO ID: 38622420136
- Website: gorodensk.rkursk.ru

Rechitsa (Russian: Речица) is a rural locality (Russian: село, lit. 'village') in Gorodensky Selsoviet Rural Settlement, Lgovsky District, Kursk Oblast, Russia. Population: 68 (2010 census); 157 (2002 census);

== Geography ==
The village is located on the Sukhaya Rechitsa River (a right tributary of the Seym), 56 km from the Russia–Ukraine border, 52 km west of Kursk, 13 km north-east of the district center – the town Lgov, 3.5 km from the selsoviet center – Gorodensk.

Climate

Rechitsa has a warm-summer humid continental climate (Dfb in the Köppen climate classification).

Climate data for Rechitsa
Month	Jan	Feb	Mar	Apr	May	Jun	Jul	Aug	Sep	Oct	Nov	Dec	Year
Mean daily maximum °C (°F)	−3.9 (25.0)	−2.9 (26.8)	3 (37)	13.1 (55.6)	19.4 (66.9)	22.7 (72.9)	25.2 (77.4)	24.5 (76.1)	18.2 (64.8)	10.6 (51.1)	3.5 (38.3)	−1 (30)	11.0 (51.8)
Daily mean °C (°F)	−5.9 (21.4)	−5.4 (22.3)	−0.5 (31.1)	8.4 (47.1)	14.8 (58.6)	18.4 (65.1)	20.9 (69.6)	20 (68)	14.1 (57.4)	7.4 (45.3)	1.3 (34.3)	−3 (27)	7.5 (45.6)
Mean daily minimum °C (°F)	−8.3 (17.1)	−8.4 (16.9)	−4.6 (23.7)	2.9 (37.2)	9.2 (48.6)	13.1 (55.6)	15.9 (60.6)	14.9 (58.8)	9.8 (49.6)	4.1 (39.4)	−1 (30)	−5.1 (22.8)	3.5 (38.4)
Average precipitation mm (inches)	51 (2.0)	45 (1.8)	48 (1.9)	51 (2.0)	63 (2.5)	71 (2.8)	76 (3.0)	55 (2.2)	58 (2.3)	58 (2.3)	48 (1.9)	49 (1.9)	673 (26.6)
Source: https://en.climate-data.org/asia/russian-federation/kursk-oblast/rechitsa-654114/

== Transport ==
Rechitsa is located 10 km from the road of regional importance 38K-017 (Kursk – Lgov – Rylsk – border with Ukraine) as part of the European route E38, on the road of intermunicipal significance 38H-433 (Lgov – Gorodensk – Borisovka – Rechitsa), 9.5 km from the nearest railway station Blokhino (railway line Lgov I — Kursk).

The rural locality is situated 59 km from Kursk Vostochny Airport, 140 km from Belgorod International Airport and 262 km from Voronezh Peter the Great Airport.
