= Arsenyevka, Lgovsky District, Kursk Oblast =

Rural locality in Kursk Oblast, Russia

Arsenyevka Арсеньевка
- Village
- Interactive map of Arsenyevka
- Location of Arsenyevka Arsenyevka (Kursk Oblast)
- Coordinates: 51°36′29″N 35°14′26″E
- Country: Russia
- Federal subject: Kursk Oblast
- Administrative district: Lgovsky District
- SelsovietSelsoviet: Vyshnederevensky

Population (2010 Census)
  - Total: 59
  - Estimate (2010): 59 (0%)

Municipal status
  - Municipal district: Lgovsky Municipal District
  - Rural settlement: Vyshnederevensky Selsoviet Rural Settlement
- Time zone: UTC+3 (MSK)
- Postal code: 307751
- Dialing code: +7 47140
- OKTMO ID: 38622417191
- Website: vishderss.rkursk.ru

Arsenyevka (Russian: Арсеньевка) is a rural locality (Russian: деревня, lit. 'village') in Vyshnederevensky Selsoviet Rural Settlement, Lgovsky District, Kursk Oblast, Russia. Population: 59 (2010 census); 102 (2002 census);

== Geography ==
The village is located on the Apoka River (a left tributary of the Seym), 43 km from the Russia–Ukraine border, 67 km south-west of Kursk, 5 km south of the district center – the town Lgov, 6.5 km from the selsoviet center – Vyshniye Derevenki.

Climate

Arsenyevka has a warm-summer humid continental climate (Dfb in the Köppen climate classification).

Climate data for Arsenyevka
Month	Jan	Feb	Mar	Apr	May	Jun	Jul	Aug	Sep	Oct	Nov	Dec	Year
Mean daily maximum °C (°F)	−3.8 (25.2)	−2.7 (27.1)	3.2 (37.8)	13.2 (55.8)	19.4 (66.9)	22.7 (72.9)	25.2 (77.4)	24.5 (76.1)	18.3 (64.9)	10.7 (51.3)	3.6 (38.5)	−0.9 (30.4)	11.1 (52.0)
Daily mean °C (°F)	−5.8 (21.6)	−5.3 (22.5)	−0.4 (31.3)	8.4 (47.1)	14.8 (58.6)	18.4 (65.1)	20.9 (69.6)	19.9 (67.8)	14.1 (57.4)	7.4 (45.3)	1.4 (34.5)	−2.9 (26.8)	7.6 (45.6)
Mean daily minimum °C (°F)	−8.3 (17.1)	−8.4 (16.9)	−4.5 (23.9)	2.9 (37.2)	9.1 (48.4)	13 (55)	15.8 (60.4)	14.8 (58.6)	9.8 (49.6)	4 (39)	−0.9 (30.4)	−5.1 (22.8)	3.5 (38.3)
Average precipitation mm (inches)	51 (2.0)	44 (1.7)	48 (1.9)	50 (2.0)	63 (2.5)	71 (2.8)	76 (3.0)	53 (2.1)	57 (2.2)	57 (2.2)	47 (1.9)	49 (1.9)	666 (26.2)
Source: https://en.climate-data.org/asia/russian-federation/kursk-oblast/арсеньевка-653967/

== Transport ==
Arsenyevka is located 2.5 km from the road of regional importance 38K-017 (Kursk – Lgov – Rylsk – border with Ukraine), 1 km from the road 38K-024 (Lgov – Sudzha), on the road of intermunicipal significance 38H-342 (38K-017 – Arsenyevka – Kochanovka – the railway halt 387 km), 3.5 km from the nearest railway station Lgov I (Lgov-Kiyevsky) (railway lines: 322 km – Lgov I, Nawlja – Lgov I, Lgov I – Podkosylev and Lgow I – Kursk).

The rural locality is situated 74 km from Kursk Vostochny Airport, 141 km from Belgorod International Airport and 277 km from Voronezh Peter the Great Airport.
