= Pogorelovka, Kursk Oblast =

Rural locality in Kursk Oblast, Russia

Pogorelovka Погореловка
- Village
- Interactive map of Pogorelovka
- Location of Pogorelovka Pogorelovka (Kursk Oblast)
- Coordinates: 51°38′46″N 35°27′55″E
- Country: Russia
- Federal subject: Kursk Oblast
- Administrative district: Lgovsky District
- SelsovietSelsoviet: Gorodensky

Population (2010 Census)
  - Total: 127
  - Estimate (2010): 127 (0%)

Municipal status
  - Municipal district: Lgovsky Municipal District
  - Rural settlement: Gorodensky Selsoviet Rural Settlement
- Time zone: UTC+3 (MSK)
- Postal code: 307736
- Dialing code: +7 47140
- OKTMO ID: 38622420131
- Website: gorodensk.rkursk.ru

Pogorelovka (Russian: Погореловка) is a rural locality (Russian: деревня, lit. 'village') in Gorodensky Selsoviet Rural Settlement, Lgovsky District, Kursk Oblast, Russia. Population: 127 (2010 census); 198 (2002 census);

== Geography ==
The village is located on the Seym River, 52 km from the Russia–Ukraine border, 51 km south-west of Kursk, 14 km east of the district center – the town Lgov, 7 km from the selsoviet center – Gorodensk.

Climate

Pogorelovka has a warm-summer humid continental climate (Dfb in the Köppen climate classification).

Climate data for Pogorelovka
Month	Jan	Feb	Mar	Apr	May	Jun	Jul	Aug	Sep	Oct	Nov	Dec	Year
Mean daily maximum °C (°F)	−3.9 (25.0)	−2.9 (26.8)	3.1 (37.6)	13.2 (55.8)	19.5 (67.1)	22.8 (73.0)	25.3 (77.5)	24.7 (76.5)	18.3 (64.9)	10.7 (51.3)	3.6 (38.5)	−1 (30)	11.1 (52.0)
Daily mean °C (°F)	−6 (21)	−5.4 (22.3)	−0.6 (30.9)	8.4 (47.1)	14.9 (58.8)	18.5 (65.3)	21 (70)	20.1 (68.2)	14.1 (57.4)	7.4 (45.3)	1.3 (34.3)	−3 (27)	7.6 (45.6)
Mean daily minimum °C (°F)	−8.4 (16.9)	−8.6 (16.5)	−4.7 (23.5)	2.9 (37.2)	9.2 (48.6)	13.1 (55.6)	15.9 (60.6)	15 (59)	9.8 (49.6)	4.1 (39.4)	−1 (30)	−5.2 (22.6)	3.5 (38.3)
Average precipitation mm (inches)	51 (2.0)	45 (1.8)	48 (1.9)	51 (2.0)	63 (2.5)	71 (2.8)	76 (3.0)	55 (2.2)	58 (2.3)	58 (2.3)	48 (1.9)	49 (1.9)	673 (26.6)
Source: https://en.climate-data.org/asia/russian-federation/kursk-oblast/pogorelovka-654113/

== Transport ==
Pogorelovka is located 4 km from the road of regional importance 38K-017 (Kursk – Lgov – Rylsk – border with Ukraine) as part of the European route E38, on the road of intermunicipal significance 38H-359 (38K-017 – Malyye Ugony – Pogorelovka), 3.5 km from the nearest railway station Blokhino (railway line Lgov I — Kursk).

The rural locality is situated 58 km from Kursk Vostochny Airport, 134 km from Belgorod International Airport and 260 km from Voronezh Peter the Great Airport.
