= Korenevo, Korenevsky District, Kursk Oblast =

Korenevo Коренево
- Urban-type settlement
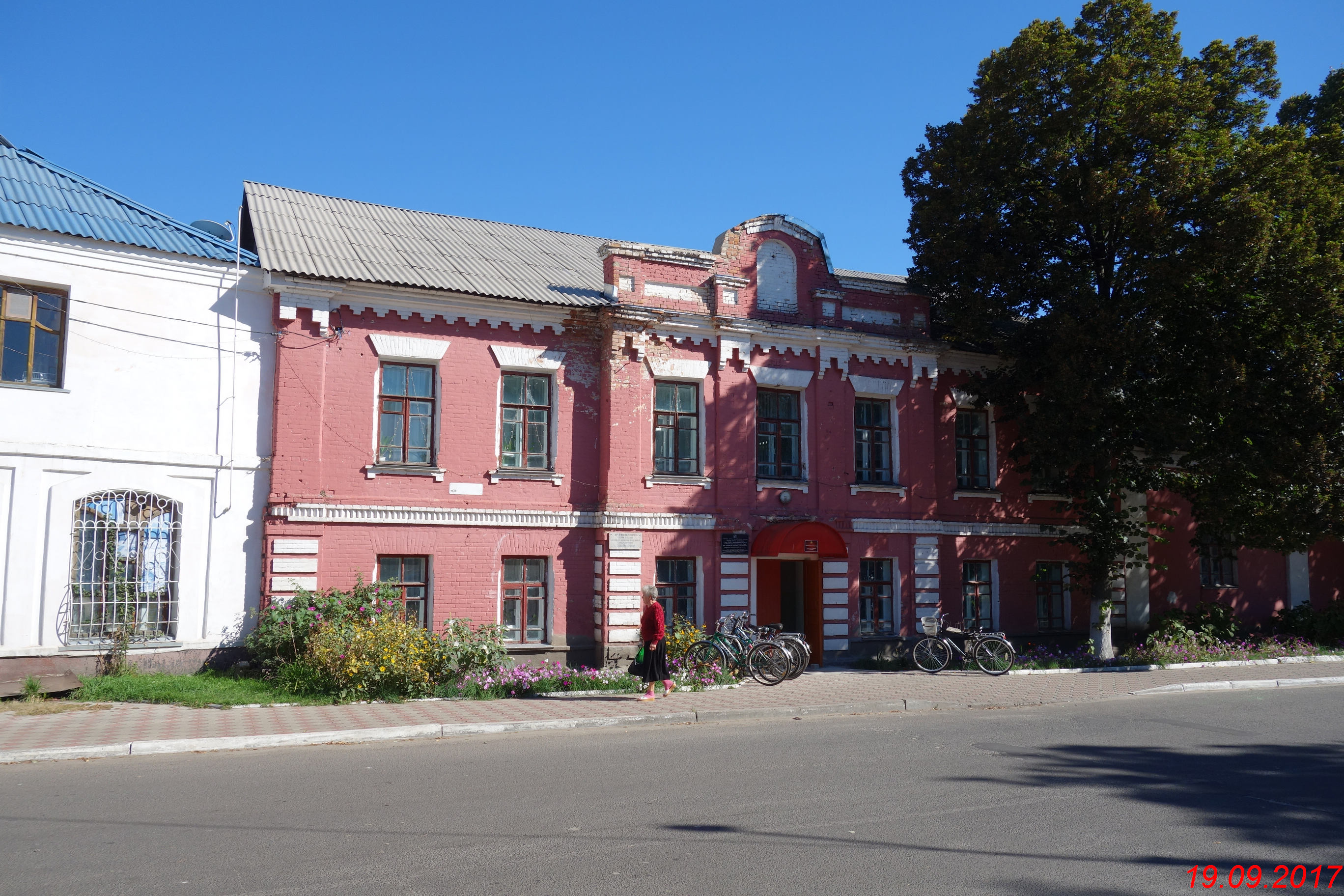
- Korenevsky District Children's Art House, place of signing of the Ukrainian-German-Russian ceasefire of 1918 during World War I
- Interactive map of Korenevo
- Location of Korenevo Korenevo (European Russia) Korenevo (Russia)
- Coordinates: 51.4142°N 34.8981°E
- Country: Russia
- Federal subject: Kursk Oblast
- Administrative district: Korenevsky District
- First mentioned: 1625

Population (2010 Census)
  - Total: 6,119
  - Estimate (1 January 2024): 5,298 (−13.4%)
- Time zone: UTC+3 (MSK)
- Postal code: 307410
- OKTMO ID: 38618151051

Korenevo (Russian: Коренево) is an urban locality (an urban-type settlement) in Korenevsky District of Kursk Oblast, Russia. Population: 5,555 (2021 census); 6,119 (2010 census); 6,630 (2002 census); 7,177 (1989 Soviet census).

== History ==
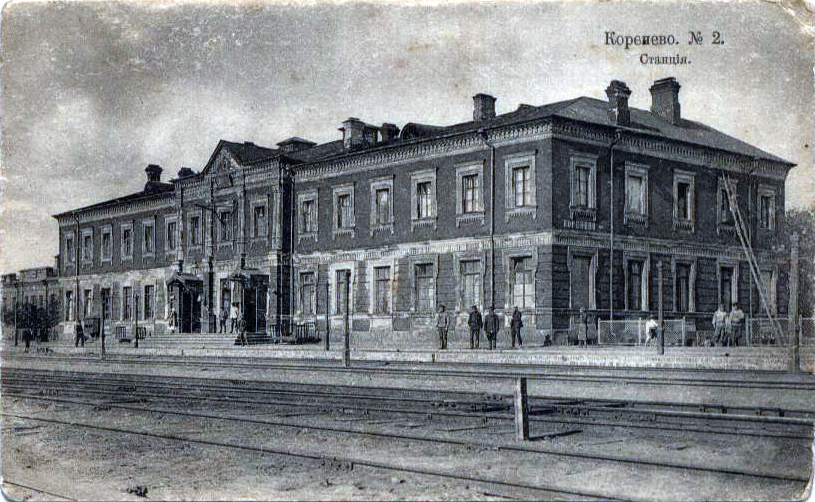
Railway station in 1912

Korenevo was first mentioned in 1625. In 1869, the local railway station was opened on the Kyiv-Kursk line.

During World War I, in April 1918, Korenevo was captured by allied Ukrainian and German forces and included within the Ukrainian State until November 1918. On 4 May 1918, a ceasefire between the Ukrainian State, Germany and Soviet Russia was signed in the settlement. In November 1919, it passed from White Russian control to the Soviets.

During World War II, Korenevo was occupied by Germany from 27 October 1941 to 8 March 1943.

During the Russo-Ukrainian War in August 2024, Korenevo has become the site of a battle in Ukraine's Kursk Offensive into Russia.
