= Kochanovka =

Rural locality in Kursk Oblast, Russia

Kochanovka Кочановка
- Village
- Interactive map of Kochanovka
- Location of Kochanovka Kochanovka (Kursk Oblast)
- Coordinates: 51°36′46″N 35°10′23″E
- Country: Russia
- Federal subject: Kursk Oblast
- Administrative district: Lgovsky District
- SelsovietSelsoviet: Selektsionny

Population (2010 Census)
  - Total: 79
  - Estimate (2010): 79 (0%)

Municipal status
  - Municipal district: Lgovsky Municipal District
  - Rural settlement: Selektsionny Selsoviet Rural Settlement
- Time zone: UTC+3 (MSK)
- Postal code: 307722
- Dialing code: +7 47140
- OKTMO ID: 38622477136
- Website: selekc.rkursk.ru

Kochanovka (Russian: Кочановка) is a rural locality (Russian: деревня, lit. 'village') in Selektsionny Selsoviet Rural Settlement, Lgovsky District, Kursk Oblast, Russia. Population: 79 (2010 census); 134 (2002 census);

== Geography ==
The village is located on the Bulgakovsky Brook (a tributary of the Apoka in the basin of the Seym), 43 km from the Russia–Ukraine border, 71 km south-west of Kursk, 7 km south-west of the district center – the town Lgov, 2.5 km from the selsoviet center – Selektsionny.

Climate

Kochanovka has a warm-summer humid continental climate (Dfb in the Köppen climate classification).

Climate data for Kochanovka
Month	Jan	Feb	Mar	Apr	May	Jun	Jul	Aug	Sep	Oct	Nov	Dec	Year
Mean daily maximum °C (°F)	−3.8 (25.2)	−2.7 (27.1)	3.2 (37.8)	13.2 (55.8)	19.4 (66.9)	22.7 (72.9)	25.2 (77.4)	24.5 (76.1)	18.3 (64.9)	10.7 (51.3)	3.6 (38.5)	−0.9 (30.4)	11.1 (52.0)
Daily mean °C (°F)	−5.8 (21.6)	−5.3 (22.5)	−0.4 (31.3)	8.4 (47.1)	14.8 (58.6)	18.4 (65.1)	20.9 (69.6)	19.9 (67.8)	14.1 (57.4)	7.4 (45.3)	1.4 (34.5)	−2.9 (26.8)	7.6 (45.6)
Mean daily minimum °C (°F)	−8.3 (17.1)	−8.4 (16.9)	−4.5 (23.9)	2.9 (37.2)	9.1 (48.4)	13 (55)	15.8 (60.4)	14.8 (58.6)	9.8 (49.6)	4 (39)	−0.9 (30.4)	−5.1 (22.8)	3.5 (38.3)
Average precipitation mm (inches)	51 (2.0)	44 (1.7)	48 (1.9)	50 (2.0)	63 (2.5)	71 (2.8)	76 (3.0)	53 (2.1)	57 (2.2)	57 (2.2)	47 (1.9)	49 (1.9)	666 (26.2)
Source: https://en.climate-data.org/asia/russian-federation/kursk-oblast/кочановка-653909/

== Transport ==
Kochanovka is located 3 km from the road of regional importance 38K-017 (Kursk – Lgov – Rylsk – border with Ukraine) as part of the European route E38, on the road of intermunicipal significance 38H-342 (38K-017 – Arsenyevka – Kochanovka – the railway halt 387 km), next to the railway halt 387 km (railway line 322 km – Lgov I).

The rural locality is situated 78 km from Kursk Vostochny Airport, 144 km from Belgorod International Airport and 281 km from Voronezh Peter the Great Airport.
