= Gorodensk =

Rural locality in Kursk Oblast, Russia

Gorodensk Городенск
- Selo
- Interactive map of Gorodensk
- Location of Gorodensk Gorodensk (Kursk Oblast)
- Coordinates: 51°40′45″N 35°22′15″E
- Country: Russia
- Federal subject: Kursk Oblast
- Administrative district: Lgovsky District
- SelsovietSelsoviet: Gorodensky

Population (2010 Census)
  - Total: 485
  - Estimate (2010): 485 (0%)

Administrative status
  - Capital of: Gorodensky Selsoviet

Municipal status
  - Municipal district: Lgovsky Municipal District
  - Rural settlement: Gorodensky Selsoviet Rural Settlement
  - Capital of: Gorodensky Selsoviet Rural Settlement
- Time zone: UTC+3 (MSK)
- Postal code: 307734
- Dialing code: +7 47140
- OKTMO ID: 38622420101
- Website: gorodensk.rkursk.ru

Gorodensk (Russian: Городенск) is a rural locality (Russian: село, lit. 'village') and the administrative center of Gorodensky Selsoviet Rural Settlement, Lgovsky District, Kursk Oblast, Russia. Population: 485 (2010 census); 591 (2002 census);

== Geography ==
The village is located on the Seym River, 52.5 km from the Russia–Ukraine border, 57 km south-west of Kursk, 8 km north-east of the district center – the town Lgov.

Climate

Gorodensk has a warm-summer humid continental climate (Dfb in the Köppen climate classification).

Climate data for Gorodensk
Month	Jan	Feb	Mar	Apr	May	Jun	Jul	Aug	Sep	Oct	Nov	Dec	Year
Mean daily maximum °C (°F)	−3.9 (25.0)	−2.9 (26.8)	3 (37)	13.1 (55.6)	19.4 (66.9)	22.7 (72.9)	25.2 (77.4)	24.5 (76.1)	18.2 (64.8)	10.6 (51.1)	3.5 (38.3)	−1 (30)	11.0 (51.8)
Daily mean °C (°F)	−5.9 (21.4)	−5.4 (22.3)	−0.5 (31.1)	8.4 (47.1)	14.8 (58.6)	18.4 (65.1)	20.9 (69.6)	20 (68)	14.1 (57.4)	7.4 (45.3)	1.3 (34.3)	−3 (27)	7.5 (45.6)
Mean daily minimum °C (°F)	−8.3 (17.1)	−8.4 (16.9)	−4.6 (23.7)	2.9 (37.2)	9.2 (48.6)	13.1 (55.6)	15.9 (60.6)	14.9 (58.8)	9.8 (49.6)	4.1 (39.4)	−1 (30)	−5.1 (22.8)	3.5 (38.4)
Average precipitation mm (inches)	50 (2.0)	44 (1.7)	48 (1.9)	50 (2.0)	63 (2.5)	71 (2.8)	77 (3.0)	54 (2.1)	57 (2.2)	57 (2.2)	48 (1.9)	49 (1.9)	668 (26.2)
Source: https://en.climate-data.org/asia/russian-federation/kursk-oblast/городенск-653987/

== Transport ==
Gorodensk is located 5.5 km from the road of regional importance 38K-017 (Kursk – Lgov – Rylsk – border with Ukraine) as part of the European route E38, on the road of intermunicipal significance 38H-433 (Lgov – Gorodensk – Borisovka – Rechitsa), 7 km from the nearest railway station Sherekino (railway line Navlya – Lgov-Kiyevsky).

The rural locality is situated 64 km from Kursk Vostochny Airport, 142 km from Belgorod International Airport and 267 km from Voronezh Peter the Great Airport.
