= Durovo-Bobrik =

Rural locality in Kursk Oblast, Russia

Durovo-Bobrik Дурово-Бобрик
- Selo
- Interactive map of Durovo-Bobrik
- Location of Durovo-Bobrik Durovo-Bobrik (Kursk Oblast)
- Coordinates: 51°28′34″N 35°20′29″E
- Country: Russia
- Federal subject: Kursk Oblast
- Administrative district: Lgovsky District
- SelsovietSelsoviet: Vyshnederevensky

Population (2010 Census)
  - Total: 76
  - Estimate (2010): 76 (0%)

Municipal status
  - Municipal district: Lgovsky Municipal District
  - Rural settlement: Vyshnederevensky Selsoviet Rural Settlement
- Time zone: UTC+3 (MSK)
- Postal code: 307702
- Dialing code: +7 47140
- OKTMO ID: 38622417126
- Website: vishderss.rkursk.ru

Durovo-Bobrik (Russian: Дурово-Бобрик) is a rural locality (Russian: село, lit. 'village') in Vyshnederevensky Selsoviet Rural Settlement, Lgovsky District, Kursk Oblast, Russia. Population: 76 (2010 census); 120 (2002 census);

== Geography ==
The village is located in the Bobrik River basin (a left tributary of the Reut River in the Seym basin), 31 km from the Russia–Ukraine border, 66 km south-west of Kursk, 21 km south-east of the district center – the town Lgov, 10 km from the selsoviet center – Vyshniye Derevenki.

Climate

Durovo-Bobrik has a warm-summer humid continental climate (Dfb in the Köppen climate classification).

Climate data for Durovo-Bobrik
Month	Jan	Feb	Mar	Apr	May	Jun	Jul	Aug	Sep	Oct	Nov	Dec	Year
Mean daily maximum °C (°F)	−3.8 (25.2)	−2.7 (27.1)	3.2 (37.8)	13.1 (55.6)	19.3 (66.7)	22.6 (72.7)	25.1 (77.2)	24.5 (76.1)	18.2 (64.8)	10.7 (51.3)	3.6 (38.5)	−0.9 (30.4)	11.1 (52.0)
Daily mean °C (°F)	−5.9 (21.4)	−5.3 (22.5)	−0.5 (31.1)	8.3 (46.9)	14.7 (58.5)	18.3 (64.9)	20.8 (69.4)	19.9 (67.8)	14 (57)	7.3 (45.1)	1.4 (34.5)	−2.9 (26.8)	7.5 (45.5)
Mean daily minimum °C (°F)	−8.3 (17.1)	−8.5 (16.7)	−4.7 (23.5)	2.8 (37.0)	9 (48)	13 (55)	15.7 (60.3)	14.8 (58.6)	9.7 (49.5)	4 (39)	−0.9 (30.4)	−5.1 (22.8)	3.5 (38.2)
Average precipitation mm (inches)	51 (2.0)	44 (1.7)	48 (1.9)	50 (2.0)	63 (2.5)	71 (2.8)	76 (3.0)	53 (2.1)	57 (2.2)	57 (2.2)	47 (1.9)	49 (1.9)	666 (26.2)
Source: https://en.climate-data.org/asia/russian-federation/kursk-oblast/durovo-bobrik-654465/

== Transport ==
Durovo-Bobrik is located 4 km from the road of regional importance 38K-024 (Lgov – Sudzha), on the road of intermunicipal significance 38Н-443 (38K-024 – Vyshniye Derevenki – Durovo-Bobrik), 2.5 km from the nearest (closed) railway halt 25 km (railway line Lgov I — Podkosylev).

The rural locality is situated 72 km from Kursk Vostochny Airport, 124 km from Belgorod International Airport and 271 km from Voronezh Peter the Great Airport.
