= Vyshniye Derevenki =

Rural locality in Kursk Oblast, Russia

Vyshniye Derevenki Вышние Деревеньки
- Selo
- Interactive map of Vyshniye Derevenki
- Location of Vyshniye Derevenki Vyshniye Derevenki (Kursk Oblast)
- Coordinates: 51°33′03″N 35°18′07″E
- Country: Russia
- Federal subject: Kursk Oblast
- Administrative district: Lgovsky District
- SelsovietSelsoviet: Vyshnederevensky

Population (2010 Census)
  - Total: 283
  - Estimate (2010): 283 (0%)

Administrative status
  - Capital of: Vyshnederevensky Selsoviet

Municipal status
  - Municipal district: Lgovsky Municipal District
  - Rural settlement: Vyshnederevensky Selsoviet Rural Settlement
  - Capital of: Vyshnederevensky Selsoviet Rural Settlement
- Time zone: UTC+3 (MSK)
- Postal code: 307701
- Dialing code: +7 47140
- OKTMO ID: 38622417101
- Website: vishderss.rkursk.ru

Vyshniye Derevenki (Russian: Вышние Деревеньки) is a rural locality (Russian: село, lit. 'village') and the administrative center of Vyshnederevensky Selsoviet Rural Settlement, Lgovsky District, Kursk Oblast, Russia. Population: 283 (2010 census); 376 (2002 census);

== Geography ==
The village is located on the Byk River (a left tributary of the Seym), 37.5 km from the Russia–Ukraine border, 65 km south-west of Kursk, 11 km south-east of the district center – the town Lgov.

Climate

Vyshniye Derevenki has a warm-summer humid continental climate (Dfb in the Köppen climate classification).

Climate data for Vyshniye Derevenki
Month	Jan	Feb	Mar	Apr	May	Jun	Jul	Aug	Sep	Oct	Nov	Dec	Year
Mean daily maximum °C (°F)	−3.8 (25.2)	−2.8 (27.0)	3.1 (37.6)	13.2 (55.8)	19.4 (66.9)	22.7 (72.9)	25.2 (77.4)	24.6 (76.3)	18.3 (64.9)	10.7 (51.3)	3.6 (38.5)	−0.9 (30.4)	11.1 (52.0)
Daily mean °C (°F)	−5.9 (21.4)	−5.4 (22.3)	−0.5 (31.1)	8.4 (47.1)	14.8 (58.6)	18.4 (65.1)	20.9 (69.6)	20 (68)	14.1 (57.4)	7.4 (45.3)	1.4 (34.5)	−2.9 (26.8)	7.6 (45.6)
Mean daily minimum °C (°F)	−8.4 (16.9)	−8.5 (16.7)	−4.7 (23.5)	2.9 (37.2)	9.1 (48.4)	13 (55)	15.8 (60.4)	14.8 (58.6)	9.8 (49.6)	4 (39)	−0.9 (30.4)	−5.1 (22.8)	3.5 (38.2)
Average precipitation mm (inches)	51 (2.0)	44 (1.7)	48 (1.9)	50 (2.0)	63 (2.5)	71 (2.8)	76 (3.0)	53 (2.1)	57 (2.2)	57 (2.2)	47 (1.9)	49 (1.9)	666 (26.2)
Source: https://en.climate-data.org/asia/russian-federation/kursk-oblast/вышние-деревеньки-653995/

== Transport ==
Vyshniye Derevenki is located 2.5 km from the road of regional importance 38K-024 (Lgov – Sudzha), on the roads of intermunicipal significance 38Н-443 (38K-024 – Vyshniye Derevenki – Durovo-Bobrik) and 38Н-455 (38K-024 – Cheremoshki – Vyshniye Derevenki), 1 km from the nearest (closed) railway halt 11 km (railway line Lgov I — Podkosylev).

The rural locality is situated 72 km from Kursk Vostochny Airport, 134 km from Belgorod International Airport and 273 km from Voronezh Peter the Great Airport.
