= Lgovsky District =

Lgovsky District Льговский район (Russian)
- District
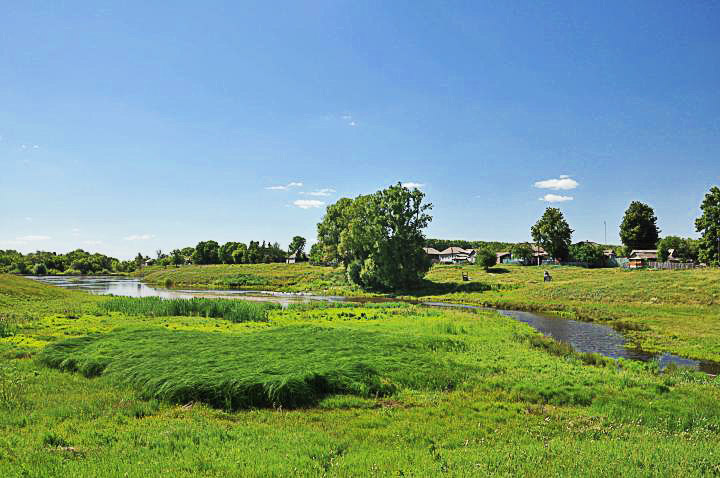
- Nadezhdovka, view of village houses

- Coat of arms
- Location of Lgovsky District in Kursk Oblast
- Coordinates: 51°40′N 35°16′E
- Country: Russia
- Federal subject: Kursk Oblast
- Administrative center: Lgov

Area
  - Total: 1,080 km^{2} (420 sq mi)

Population (2010 Census)
  - Total: 14,451
  - Density: 13.4/km^{2} (34.7/sq mi)
  - Urban: 0%
  - Rural: 100%

Administrative structure
  - Administrative divisions: 17 selsoviet
  - Inhabited localities: 91 rural localities

Municipal structure
  - Municipally incorporated as: Lgovsky Municipal District
  - Municipal divisions: 0 urban settlements, 8 rural settlements
- Time zone: UTC+3 (MSK)
- OKTMO ID: 38622000
- Website: http://rlgov.ru/

Lgovsky District (Russian: Льго́вский райо́н) is an administrative and municipal district (raion), one of the twenty-eight in Kursk Oblast, Russia. It is located in the central eastern part of the oblast. The area of the district is 1,080 square kilometers (420 sq mi). Its administrative center is the town of Lgov (which is not administratively a part of the district). Population: 11,942 (2021 census); 14,451 (2010 census); 19,313 (2002 Census); 23,866 (1989 Soviet census).

== Geography ==
Lgovsky District is located in the west central region of Kursk Oblast. The terrain is hilly plain; the district lies on the Orel-Kursk plateau of the Central Russian Upland. The main river in the district is the Seym River, a tributary of the Desna River to the southwest, of the Don River (Russia) basin. The district is 40 km west of the city of Kursk and 480 km southwest of Moscow. The area measures 40 km (north-south), and 40 km (west-east). The administrative center is the town of Lgov.

The district is bordered on the north by Konyshyovsky District, on the east by Kurchatovsky District, on the south by Bolshesoldatsky District, and on the west by Rylsky District.

== Administrative and municipal status ==
Within the framework of administrative divisions, Lgovsky District is one of the twenty-eight in the oblast. The town of Lgov serves as its administrative center, despite being incorporated separately as a town of oblast significance—an administrative unit with the status equal to that of the districts.

As a municipal division, the district is incorporated as Lgovsky Municipal District. The town of oblast significance of Lgov is incorporated separately from the district as Lgov Urban Okrug.
