= Viktorovka, Lgovsky District, Kursk Oblast =

Rural locality in Kursk Oblast, Russia

Viktorovka Викторовка
- Settlement
- Interactive map of Viktorovka
- Location of Viktorovka Viktorovka (Kursk Oblast)
- Coordinates: 51°38′09″N 35°11′15″E
- Country: Russia
- Federal subject: Kursk Oblast
- Administrative district: Lgovsky District
- SelsovietSelsoviet: Selektsionny

Population (2010 Census)
  - Total: 10
  - Estimate (2010): 10 (0%)

Municipal status
  - Municipal district: Lgovsky Municipal District
  - Rural settlement: Selektsionny Selsoviet Rural Settlement
- Time zone: UTC+3 (MSK)
- Postal code: 307720
- Dialing code: +7 47140
- OKTMO ID: 38622477126
- Website: selekc.rkursk.ru

Viktorovka (Russian: Викторовка) is a rural locality (a settlement) in Selektsionny Selsoviet Rural Settlement, Lgovsky District, Kursk Oblast, Russia. Population: 10 (2010 census); 26 (2002 census);

== Geography ==
The settlement is located 45.5 km from the Russia–Ukraine border, 70 km south-west of Kursk, 5 km south-west of the district center – the town Lgov, 1.5 km from the selsoviet center – Selektsionny.

Climate

Viktorovka has a warm-summer humid continental climate (Dfb in the Köppen climate classification).

== Transport ==
Viktorovka is located on the road of regional importance 38K-017 (Kursk – Lgov – Rylsk – border with Ukraine) as part of the European route E38, 1 km from the road of intermunicipal significance 38H-375 (38K-017 – Fitizh), 0.5 km from the nearest railway station Artakowo (railway line 322 km – Lgov I).

The rural locality is situated 77.5 km from Kursk Vostochny Airport, 146 km from Belgorod International Airport and 280 km from Voronezh Peter the Great Airport.
