= Novy Mir, Kursk Oblast =

Rural locality in Kursk Oblast, Russia

Novy Mir Новый Мир
- Selo
- Interactive map of Novy Mir
- Location of Novy Mir Novy Mir (Kursk Oblast)
- Coordinates: 51°38′04″N 35°07′30″E
- Country: Russia
- Federal subject: Kursk Oblast
- Administrative district: Lgovsky District
- SelsovietSelsoviet: Selektsionny

Population (2010 Census)
  - Total: 70
  - Estimate (2010): 70 (0%)

Municipal status
  - Municipal district: Lgovsky Municipal District
  - Rural settlement: Selektsionny Selsoviet Rural Settlement
- Time zone: UTC+3 (MSK)
- Postal code: 307720
- Dialing code: +7 47140
- OKTMO ID: 38622477111
- Website: selekc.rkursk.ru

Novy Mir (Russian: Новый Мир) is a rural locality (Russian: село, lit. 'village') in Selektsionny Selsoviet Rural Settlement, Lgovsky District, Kursk Oblast, Russia. Population: 70 (2010 census); 99 (2002 census);

== Geography ==
The village is located on the Rechitsa River (a left tributary of the Seym), 45 km from the Russia–Ukraine border, 74 km south-west of Kursk, 9 km south-west of the district center – the town Lgov, 2.5 km from the selsoviet center – Selektsionny.

Climate

Novy Mir has a warm-summer humid continental climate (Dfb in the Köppen climate classification).

== Transport ==
Novy Mir is located on the road of regional importance 38K-017 (Kursk – Lgov – Rylsk – border with Ukraine) as part of the European route E38, 2 km from the road of intermunicipal significance 38H-375 (38K-017 – Fitizh), 3.5 km from the nearest railway halt 387 km (railway line 322 km – Lgov I).

The rural locality is situated 81 km from Kursk Vostochny Airport, 149 km from Belgorod International Airport and 283 km from Voronezh Peter the Great Airport.
