= Sherekino, Selektsionny selsoviet, Lgovsky District, Kursk Oblast =

Rural locality in Kursk Oblast, Russia

Sherekino Шерекино
- Village
- Interactive map of Sherekino
- Location of Sherekino Sherekino (Kursk Oblast)
- Coordinates: 51°39′46″N 35°13′33″E
- Country: Russia
- Federal subject: Kursk Oblast
- Administrative district: Lgovsky District
- SelsovietSelsoviet: Selektsionny

Population (2010 Census)
  - Total: 660
  - Estimate (2010): 660 (0%)

Municipal status
  - Municipal district: Lgovsky Municipal District
  - Rural settlement: Selektsionny Selsoviet Rural Settlement
- Time zone: UTC+3 (MSK)
- Postal code: 307741
- Dialing code: +7 47140
- OKTMO ID: 38622477116
- Website: selekc.rkursk.ru

Sherekino (Russian: Шерекино) is a rural locality (Russian: деревня, lit. 'village') in Selektsionny Selsoviet Rural Settlement, Lgovsky District, Kursk Oblast, Russia. Population: 660 (2010 census); 824 (2002 census);

== Geography ==
The village is located on Lake Sherekinskoye in the Seym River basin, 48.5 km from the Russia–Ukraine border, 67 km south-west of Kursk, 1.5 km north-west of the district center – the town Lgov, 5 km from the selsoviet center – Selektsionny.

Climate

Sherekino has a warm-summer humid continental climate (Dfb in the Köppen climate classification).

Climate data for Sherekino
Month	Jan	Feb	Mar	Apr	May	Jun	Jul	Aug	Sep	Oct	Nov	Dec	Year
Mean daily maximum °C (°F)	−3.8 (25.2)	−2.8 (27.0)	3.2 (37.8)	13.2 (55.8)	19.5 (67.1)	22.8 (73.0)	25.3 (77.5)	24.6 (76.3)	18.3 (64.9)	10.7 (51.3)	3.6 (38.5)	−0.9 (30.4)	11.1 (52.1)
Daily mean °C (°F)	−5.9 (21.4)	−5.3 (22.5)	−0.5 (31.1)	8.4 (47.1)	14.9 (58.8)	18.5 (65.3)	21 (70)	20 (68)	14.1 (57.4)	7.4 (45.3)	1.4 (34.5)	−2.9 (26.8)	7.6 (45.7)
Mean daily minimum °C (°F)	−8.3 (17.1)	−8.4 (16.9)	−4.6 (23.7)	3 (37)	9.2 (48.6)	13.2 (55.8)	15.9 (60.6)	14.9 (58.8)	9.9 (49.8)	4.1 (39.4)	−0.9 (30.4)	−5.1 (22.8)	3.6 (38.4)
Average precipitation mm (inches)	50 (2.0)	44 (1.7)	48 (1.9)	50 (2.0)	63 (2.5)	71 (2.8)	77 (3.0)	54 (2.1)	57 (2.2)	57 (2.2)	48 (1.9)	49 (1.9)	668 (26.2)
Source: https://en.climate-data.org/asia/russian-federation/kursk-oblast/шерекино-549448/

== Transport ==
Sherekino is located 3 km from the road of regional importance 38K-017 (Kursk – Lgov – Rylsk – border with Ukraine) as part of the European route E38, 1.5 km from the road 38K-042 (38K-017 – Lgov), 0.3 km from the nearest railway halt 584 km (Lgov II) (railway line Navlya – Lgov-Kiyevsky).

The rural locality is situated 79 km from Kursk Vostochny Airport, 146 km from Belgorod International Airport and 276 km from Voronezh Peter the Great Airport.
