= Fitizh =

Rural locality in Kursk Oblast, Russia

Fitizh Фитиж
- Selo
- Interactive map of Fitizh
- Location of Fitizh Fitizh (Kursk Oblast)
- Coordinates: 51°40′47″N 35°08′45″E
- Country: Russia
- Federal subject: Kursk Oblast
- Administrative district: Lgovsky District
- SelsovietSelsoviet: Selektsionny

Population (2010 Census)
  - Total: 457
  - Estimate (2010): 457 (0%)

Municipal status
  - Municipal district: Lgovsky Municipal District
  - Rural settlement: Selektsionny Selsoviet Rural Settlement
- Time zone: UTC+3 (MSK)
- Postal code: 307723
- Dialing code: +7 47140
- OKTMO ID: 38622477106
- Website: selekc.rkursk.ru

Fitizh (Russian: Фитиж) is a rural locality (Russian: село, lit. 'village') in Selektsionny Selsoviet Rural Settlement, Lgovsky District, Kursk Oblast, Russia. Population: 457 (2010 census); 686 (2002 census);

== Geography ==
The village is located on the Rechitsa River (a left tributary of the Seym) and on Lake Fitizh, 49.5 km (30.8 mi) from the Russia–Ukraine border, 72 km (45 mi) west of Kursk, 8 km (5.0 mi) north-west of the district center – the town Lgov, 5 km (3.1 mi) from the selsoviet center – Selektsionny.

Climate

Fitizh has a warm-summer humid continental climate (Dfb in the Köppen climate classification).

Climate data for Fitizh
Month	Jan	Feb	Mar	Apr	May	Jun	Jul	Aug	Sep	Oct	Nov	Dec	Year
Mean daily maximum °C (°F)	−3.7 (25.3)	−2.7 (27.1)	3.3 (37.9)	13.3 (55.9)	19.6 (67.3)	22.8 (73.0)	25.3 (77.5)	24.6 (76.3)	18.3 (64.9)	10.8 (51.4)	3.7 (38.7)	−0.9 (30.4)	11.2 (52.1)
Daily mean °C (°F)	−5.8 (21.6)	−5.2 (22.6)	−0.3 (31.5)	8.5 (47.3)	14.9 (58.8)	18.5 (65.3)	21 (70)	20.1 (68.2)	14.2 (57.6)	7.5 (45.5)	1.5 (34.7)	−2.8 (27.0)	7.7 (45.8)
Mean daily minimum °C (°F)	−8.2 (17.2)	−8.3 (17.1)	−4.3 (24.3)	3.1 (37.6)	9.3 (48.7)	13.2 (55.8)	16 (61)	15 (59)	10 (50)	4.2 (39.6)	−0.8 (30.6)	−5 (23)	3.7 (38.7)
Average precipitation mm (inches)	50 (2.0)	44 (1.7)	48 (1.9)	50 (2.0)	63 (2.5)	71 (2.8)	77 (3.0)	54 (2.1)	57 (2.2)	57 (2.2)	48 (1.9)	49 (1.9)	668 (26.2)
Source: https://en.climate-data.org/asia/russian-federation/kursk-oblast/фитиж-498673/

== Transport ==
Fitizh is located 4.5 km from the road of regional importance 38K-017 (Kursk – Lgov – Rylsk – border with Ukraine) as part of the European route E38, on the road of intermunicipal significance 38H-375 (38K-017 – Fitizh), 6 km from the nearest railway station Artakowo (railway line 322 km – Lgov I).

The rural locality is situated 79 km from Kursk Vostochny Airport, 151 km from Belgorod International Airport and 282 km from Voronezh Peter the Great Airport.
