= Selektsionny, Kursk Oblast =

Rural locality in Kursk Oblast, Russia

Selektsionny Селекционный
- Settlement
- Interactive map of Selektsionny
- Location of Selektsionny Selektsionny (Kursk Oblast)
- Coordinates: 51°38′05″N 35°09′57″E
- Country: Russia
- Federal subject: Kursk Oblast
- Administrative district: Lgovsky District
- SelsovietSelsoviet: Selektsionny

Population (2010 Census)
  - Total: 961
  - Estimate (2010): 961 (0%)

Administrative status
  - Capital of: Selektsionny Selsoviet

Municipal status
  - Municipal district: Lgovsky Municipal District
  - Rural settlement: Selektsionny Selsoviet Rural Settlement
  - Capital of: Selektsionny Selsoviet Rural Settlement
- Time zone: UTC+3 (MSK)
- Postal code: 307720
- Dialing code: +7 47140
- OKTMO ID: 38622477101
- Website: selekc.rkursk.ru

Selektsionny (Russian: Селекционный) is a rural locality (a settlement) and the administrative center of Selektsionny Selsoviet Rural Settlement, Lgovsky District, Kursk Oblast, Russia. Population: 961 (2010 census); 1,173 (2002 census);

== Geography ==
The settlement is located 45 km from the Russia–Ukraine border, 72 km south-west of Kursk, 6.5 km south-west of the district center – the town Lgov.

Climate

Selektsionny has a warm-summer humid continental climate (Dfb in the Köppen climate classification).

Climate data for Selektsionny (Selektsionniye)
Month	Jan	Feb	Mar	Apr	May	Jun	Jul	Aug	Sep	Oct	Nov	Dec	Year
Mean daily maximum °C (°F)	−3.8 (25.2)	−2.7 (27.1)	3.2 (37.8)	13.2 (55.8)	19.4 (66.9)	22.7 (72.9)	25.2 (77.4)	24.5 (76.1)	18.3 (64.9)	10.7 (51.3)	3.6 (38.5)	−0.9 (30.4)	11.1 (52.0)
Daily mean °C (°F)	−5.8 (21.6)	−5.3 (22.5)	−0.4 (31.3)	8.4 (47.1)	14.8 (58.6)	18.4 (65.1)	20.9 (69.6)	19.9 (67.8)	14.1 (57.4)	7.4 (45.3)	1.4 (34.5)	−2.9 (26.8)	7.6 (45.6)
Mean daily minimum °C (°F)	−8.3 (17.1)	−8.4 (16.9)	−4.5 (23.9)	2.9 (37.2)	9.1 (48.4)	13 (55)	15.8 (60.4)	14.8 (58.6)	9.8 (49.6)	4 (39)	−0.9 (30.4)	−5.1 (22.8)	3.5 (38.3)
Average precipitation mm (inches)	50 (2.0)	44 (1.7)	48 (1.9)	50 (2.0)	63 (2.5)	71 (2.8)	77 (3.0)	54 (2.1)	57 (2.2)	57 (2.2)	48 (1.9)	49 (1.9)	668 (26.2)
Source: https://en.climate-data.org/asia/russian-federation/kursk-oblast/selektsionniye-317700/

== Transport ==
Selektsionny is located on the road of regional importance 38K-017 (Kursk – Lgov – Rylsk – border with Ukraine), on the road of intermunicipal significance 38H-375 (38K-017 – Fitizh), 2.5 km from the nearest railway halt 387 km (railway line 322 km – Lgov I).

The rural locality is situated 78.5 km from Kursk Vostochny Airport, 147 km from Belgorod International Airport and 282 km from Voronezh Peter the Great Airport.
