= Impact of the COVID-19 pandemic =

The effects of the COVID-19 pandemic, a global pandemic of coronavirus disease 2019 (COVID-19) caused by severe acute respiratory syndrome coronavirus 2 (SARS CoV‑2), have been broad, affecting general society, the global economy, culture, ecology, politics, and other areas. These aspects are discussed across many articles:

== Economic impact ==
- 2020 Russia–Saudi Arabia oil price war
- 2020 stock market crash
- Charitable activities related to the COVID-19 pandemic
  - Moldovan–Romanian collaboration during the COVID-19 pandemic
- COVID-19 recession
- Financial market impact of the COVID-19 pandemic
  - Impact of the COVID-19 pandemic on mink farming

=== By country ===
- Economic impact of the COVID-19 pandemic in Canada
- Economic impact of the COVID-19 pandemic in India
  - Indian migrant workers during the COVID-19 pandemic
- Economic impact of the COVID-19 pandemic in the Republic of Ireland
  - COVID-19 Pandemic Unemployment Payment
  - July Jobs Stimulus
  - Economic Recovery Plan 2021
- Economic impact of the COVID-19 pandemic in Malaysia
- Economic impact of the COVID-19 pandemic in New Zealand
- Economic impact of the COVID-19 pandemic in Russia
- Economic impact of the COVID-19 pandemic in the United Kingdom
- Economic impact of the COVID-19 pandemic in the United States

=== By industry ===
- Impact of the COVID-19 pandemic on aviation
  - Impact of the COVID-19 pandemic on airlines
    - World's longest domestic flight
- Impact of the COVID-19 pandemic on the cannabis industry
- Impact of the COVID-19 pandemic on consumer products
- Impact of the COVID-19 pandemic on the food industry
  - Impact of the COVID-19 pandemic on the meat industry in Canada
  - Impact of the COVID-19 pandemic on the meat industry in the United States
  - Impact of the COVID-19 pandemic on the restaurant industry
  - Impact of the COVID-19 pandemic on the restaurant industry in the United States
- Impact of the COVID-19 pandemic on journalism
- Impact of the COVID-19 pandemic on retail
- Impact of the COVID-19 pandemic on tourism
- Travel restrictions related to the COVID-19 pandemic

== Impact on culture and entertainment ==
- Impact of the COVID-19 pandemic on cinema
  - List of films impacted by the COVID-19 pandemic
- Impact of the COVID-19 pandemic on education
  - 2020 UK GCSE and A-Level grading controversy
  - Homeschooling during the COVID-19 pandemic
  - Impact of the COVID-19 pandemic on education in Ghana
  - Impact of the COVID-19 pandemic on education in the Republic of Ireland
  - Impact of the COVID-19 pandemic on education in the United Kingdom
  - Impact of the COVID-19 pandemic on education in the United States
- Impact of the COVID-19 pandemic on sports
  - By type
    - Impact of the COVID-19 pandemic on association football
    - Impact of the COVID-19 pandemic on baseball
    - Impact of the COVID-19 pandemic on basketball
    - Impact of the COVID-19 pandemic on combat sports
    - Impact of the COVID-19 pandemic on cricket
    - Impact of the COVID-19 pandemic on disc golf
    - Impact of the COVID-19 pandemic on Gaelic games
    - Impact of the COVID-19 pandemic on gridiron football
    - Impact of the COVID-19 pandemic on ice hockey
    - Impact of the COVID-19 pandemic on motorsport
    - Impact of the COVID-19 pandemic on rugby league
  - By country
    - Impact of the COVID-19 pandemic on sports in the Republic of Ireland
    - Impact of the COVID-19 pandemic on Philippine sports
  - Suspension of the 2019–20 NBA season
- Impact of the COVID-19 pandemic on television
  - Impact of the COVID-19 pandemic on television in the United States
  - List of American television series impacted by the COVID-19 pandemic
- Impact of the COVID-19 pandemic on the arts and cultural heritage
  - COVID-19 pandemic in popular culture
- Impact of the COVID-19 pandemic on the fashion industry
- Impact of the COVID-19 pandemic on the music industry
- Impact of the COVID-19 pandemic on the performing arts
- Impact of the COVID-19 pandemic on the video game industry
- Impact of the COVID-19 pandemic on The Walt Disney Company

== Impact on information ==
- Media coverage of the COVID-19 pandemic
- Misinformation related to the COVID-19 pandemic
  - COVID-19 misinformation by governments
  - COVID-19 misinformation by China
  - COVID-19 misinformation by the United States
  - COVID-19 misinformation in Canada
  - COVID-19 misinformation in the Philippines
  - List of unproven methods against COVID-19
  - Plandemic
- Wikipedia's response to the COVID-19 pandemic

== Impact on society and rights ==
- Gendered impact of the COVID-19 pandemic
- Human rights issues related to the COVID-19 pandemic
  - COVID-19 pandemic on human rights in Argentina
- Impact of the COVID-19 pandemic on children
  - Impact of the COVID-19 pandemic on foster care in the United States
- Impact of the COVID-19 pandemic on healthcare workers
- Legal issues
  - Impact of the COVID-19 pandemic on abortion in the United States
  - Impact of the COVID-19 pandemic on crime
  - Impact of the COVID-19 pandemic on domestic violence
  - Impact of the COVID-19 pandemic on prisons
- Impact of the COVID-19 pandemic on long-term care facilities
- Impact of the COVID-19 pandemic on the LGBT community
- Impact of the COVID-19 pandemic on public transport
- Impact of the COVID-19 pandemic on religion
  - Impact of the COVID-19 pandemic on funerals
  - Impact of the COVID-19 pandemic on Hajj
  - Impact of the COVID-19 pandemic on the Catholic Church
- Xenophobia and racism related to the COVID-19 pandemic
- Mental health during the COVID-19 pandemic
- Social impact of the COVID-19 pandemic
  - Coronavirus party
  - Impact of the COVID-19 pandemic on social media
  - Social impact of the COVID-19 pandemic in Malaysia
  - Social impact of the COVID-19 pandemic in New Zealand
  - Social impact of the COVID-19 pandemic in Russia
  - Social impact of the COVID-19 pandemic in the Republic of Ireland
  - Social impact of the COVID-19 pandemic in the United Kingdom
  - Social impact of the COVID-19 pandemic in the United States
    - Impact of the COVID-19 pandemic on African-American communities
    - Impact of the COVID-19 pandemic on Native American tribes and tribal communities
  - Social stigma associated with COVID-19
- Strikes during the COVID-19 pandemic
- Workplace hazard controls for COVID-19

== Political impact ==
- By country:
  - Impact of the COVID-19 pandemic on politics in Malaysia
  - Impact of the COVID-19 pandemic on politics in the Republic of Ireland
  - Impact of the COVID-19 pandemic on politics in Russia
- European Union response to the COVID-19 pandemic
- Impact of the COVID-19 pandemic on international relations
  - Federal aid during the COVID-19 pandemic in Canada
  - International aid related to the COVID-19 pandemic
  - International reactions to the COVID-19 pandemic in Italy
  - Global ceasefire
- List of COVID-19 pandemic legislation
- National responses to the COVID-19 pandemic
  - British government response to the COVID-19 pandemic
  - German government response to the COVID-19 pandemic
  - Ghanaian government response to the COVID-19 pandemic
  - Indian government response to the COVID-19 pandemic
    - Indian state government responses to the COVID-19 pandemic
  - Irish government response to the COVID-19 pandemic
  - New Zealand government response to the COVID-19 pandemic
  - Nigerian government response to the COVID-19 pandemic
  - Philippine government response to the COVID-19 pandemic
  - Russian government responses to the COVID-19 pandemic
  - Swedish government response to the COVID-19 pandemic
  - United States responses to the COVID-19 pandemic
    - U.S. federal government response to the COVID-19 pandemic
      - Trump administration communication during the COVID-19 pandemic
    - U.S. state and local government responses to the COVID-19 pandemic
      - California government response to the COVID-19 pandemic
      - Eastern States Multi-state Council
      - Midwest Governors Regional Pact
      - New York state government response to the COVID-19 pandemic
      - Texas government response to the COVID-19 pandemic
      - Western States Pact
  - Vietnamese government response to the COVID-19 pandemic
- Protests over responses to the COVID-19 pandemic
  - Protests over COVID-19 policies in Italy
  - Protests over COVID-19 policies in Germany
  - COVID-19 anti-lockdown protests in New Zealand
  - 2020–2021 Serbian protests
  - COVID-19 anti-lockdown protests in the United Kingdom
  - COVID-19 anti-lockdown protests in the United States
    - 2020 United States anti-lockdown protests
    - Open the States
- United Nations' response to the COVID-19 pandemic
- World Health Organization's response to the COVID-19 pandemic

== Others ==
- Anthropause
- COVID-19 lockdowns
- Evacuations related to the COVID-19 pandemic
  - Evacuations by India related to the COVID-19 pandemic
  - Evacuations by the Philippines related to the COVID-19 pandemic
- Food security during the COVID-19 pandemic
- Impact of the COVID-19 pandemic on animals
- Impact of the COVID-19 pandemic on hospitals
  - Impact of the COVID-19 pandemic on ICU capacity
- Impact of the COVID-19 pandemic on language
- Impact of the COVID-19 pandemic on other health issues
- Impact of the COVID-19 pandemic on overseas Filipinos
- Impact of the COVID-19 pandemic on people with disabilities
- Impact of the COVID-19 pandemic on science and technology
- Impact of the COVID-19 pandemic on the environment
- Impact of the COVID-19 pandemic on migration
- Impact of the COVID-19 pandemic on the military
  - Withdrawal of U.S. troops from Iraq
- Pandemic fatigue
- Shortages related to the COVID-19 pandemic
- COVID-19 pandemic deaths
  - List of deaths due to COVID-19
  - COVID-19 pandemic death rates by country
