= Index of articles related to COVID-19 =

Alphabetical listing of COVID-19 related topics

This is an index of COVID-19 topics. It is an alphabetical index of articles relating to COVID-19 and the virus that causes it, SARS-CoV-2.

== A ==
- Impact of the COVID-19 pandemic on abortion in the United States
- COVID-19 Advisory Board
- Impact of the COVID-19 pandemic on the African diaspora
- COVID-19 alert levels in New Zealand
- Alzheimer's disease and COVID-19
- Impact of the COVID-19 pandemic on American sports broadcasting
- COVID-19 pandemic and animals
- COVID-19 apps
- Impact of the COVID-19 pandemic on the arts and cultural heritage
- Assessment on COVID-19 Origins
- Impact of the COVID-19 pandemic on association football

== B ==
- Pandemic baking
- COVID-19 pandemic baby bust
- Impact of the COVID-19 pandemic on baseball
- Impact of the COVID-19 pandemic on basketball
- Covid-19 Bereaved Families for Justice
- Bio-secure bubble

== C ==
- Impact of the COVID-19 pandemic on the cannabis industry
- Impact of the COVID-19 pandemic on the Catholic Church
- Charitable activities related to the COVID-19 pandemic
- Impact of the COVID-19 pandemic on children
- Impact of the COVID-19 pandemic on cinema
- Clap for Our Carers
- Cluster 5
- Impact of the COVID-19 pandemic on combat sports
- Impact of the COVID-19 pandemic on commercial air transport
- 2020s commodities boom
- Impact of the COVID-19 pandemic on consumer products
- Corona-chan
- COVAX
- Covaxgate
- Covaxin
- COVAX-19
- COVID-19 CPI
- Impact of the COVID-19 pandemic on cricket
- Impact of the COVID-19 pandemic on crime
- COVID-19 pandemic on cruise ships
- Cytokine storm

== D ==
- 2020 Danish mink cull
- List of deaths due to COVID-19
- Impact of the COVID-19 pandemic on people with disabilities
- Impact of the COVID-19 pandemic on disc golf
- Impact of the COVID-19 pandemic on domestic violence
- COVID-19 drug development
- COVID-19 drug repurposing research

== E ==
- Economic impact of the COVID-19 pandemic
  - Economic impact of the COVID-19 pandemic in Canada
  - Economic impact of the COVID-19 pandemic in India
  - Economic impact of the COVID-19 pandemic in the Republic of Ireland
  - Economic impact of the COVID-19 pandemic in Malaysia
  - Economic impact of the COVID-19 pandemic in New Zealand
  - Economic impact of the COVID-19 pandemic in Russia
  - Economic impact of the COVID-19 pandemic in the United Kingdom
  - Economic impact of the COVID-19 pandemic in the United States
- Impact of the COVID-19 pandemic on education
  - Impact of the COVID-19 pandemic on education in Ghana
  - Impact of the COVID-19 pandemic on education in the Republic of Ireland
  - Impact of the COVID-19 pandemic on education in the United Kingdom
  - Impact of the COVID-19 pandemic on education in the United States
- Endemic COVID-19
- Impact of the COVID-19 pandemic on the environment
- COVID-19 eviction moratoriums in the United States

== F ==
- Face masks during the COVID-19 pandemic
  - Face masks during the COVID-19 pandemic in the United States
- Impact of the COVID-19 pandemic on the fashion industry
- Pandemic fatigue
- Impact of the COVID-19 pandemic on female education
- Financial market impact of the COVID-19 pandemic
- Impact of the COVID-19 pandemic on the food industry
- Food security during the COVID-19 pandemic
- Impact of the COVID-19 pandemic on foster care in the United States
- Impact of the COVID-19 pandemic on funerals

== G ==
- Impact of the COVID-19 pandemic on Gaelic games
- Gendered impact of the COVID-19 pandemic
- COVID-19 Genomics UK Consortium
- 2021–2023 global supply chain crisis
- Impact of the COVID-19 pandemic on gridiron football
- Great Resignation

== H ==
- Impact of the COVID-19 pandemic on Hajj
- Impact of the COVID-19 pandemic on healthcare workers
- COVID-19 and homelessness
- COVID-19 hospital
  - COVID-19 hospitals in the United Kingdom
- Human rights issues related to the COVID-19 pandemic
- Impact of the COVID-19 pandemic on human rights in Argentina

== I ==
- Impact of the COVID-19 pandemic on ice hockey
- Impact of the COVID-19 pandemic on ICU capacity
- Imagine (Gal Gadot video)
- COVID-19 Immunity Task Force
- Impact of the COVID-19 pandemic on Indian migrant workers
- 2021–2023 inflation surge
- Impact of the COVID-19 pandemic on international relations
- Ivermectin during the COVID-19 pandemic

== J ==
- Janssen COVID-19 vaccine
- Impact of the COVID-19 pandemic on journalism

== K ==
- None

== L ==
- COVID-19 lab leak theory
- Impact of the COVID-19 pandemic on the LGBTQ community
- COVID-19 lockdowns
  - COVID-19 lockdowns by country
- Long COVID
- Long Covid Kids
- Impact of the COVID-19 pandemic on long-term care facilities
- Love is not tourism

== M ==
- Impact of the COVID-19 pandemic on the meat industry in Canada
- Impact of the COVID-19 pandemic on the meat industry in the United States
- Media coverage of the COVID-19 pandemic
- Mental health during the COVID-19 pandemic
- Impact of the COVID-19 pandemic on migration
- Impact of the COVID-19 pandemic on the military
- COVID-19 misinformation
  - COVID-19 misinformation in Canada
  - COVID-19 misinformation by governments
    - COVID-19 misinformation by China
    - COVID-19 misinformation by the United States
  - COVID-19 misinformation in the Philippines
- Impact of the COVID-19 pandemic on motorsport

== N ==
- COVID-19 naming
- Impact of the COVID-19 pandemic on Native American tribes and tribal communities
- COVID-19 pandemic on naval ships
- Suspension of the 2019–20 NBA season
- Impact of COVID-19 on neurological, psychological and other mental health outcomes

== O ==
- Ontario COVID-19 Science Advisory Table
- COVID-19 Origin Act of 2023
- Origin of SARS-CoV-2
- Impact of the COVID-19 pandemic on other health issues
- Oxford–AstraZeneca COVID-19 vaccine

== P ==
- COVID-19 pandemic
  - COVID-19 pandemic by country and territory
- COVID-19 pandemic cases
- COVID-19 pandemic deaths
- COVID-19 pandemic death rates by country
- Impact of the COVID-19 pandemic on the performing arts
- Pfizer–BioNTech COVID-19 vaccine
- Plandemic
- Political impact of the COVID-19 pandemic
  - Impact of the COVID-19 pandemic on politics in the Republic of Ireland
  - Impact of the COVID-19 pandemic on politics in Malaysia
  - Impact of the COVID-19 pandemic on politics in Russia
- COVID-19 pandemic in popular culture
- Population decline
- COVID-19 in pregnancy
- Impact of the COVID-19 pandemic on prisons
- Protests against responses to the COVID-19 pandemic
  - COVID-19 protests in the Republic of Ireland
- The proximal origin of SARS-CoV-2
- Public health mitigation of COVID-19
- Impact of the COVID-19 pandemic on public transport

== Q ==
- None

== R ==
- COVID-19 rapid antigen test
- COVID-19 recession
- Impact of the COVID-19 pandemic on religion
- COVID-19 Response Acceleration Task Force
- COVID-19 Response (Vaccinations) Legislation Act 2021
- Impact of the COVID-19 pandemic on the restaurant industry
  - Impact of the COVID-19 pandemic on the restaurant industry in the United States
- Impact of the COVID-19 pandemic on retail
- Retail apocalypse
  - List of retailers affected by the retail apocalypse
- Impact of the COVID-19 pandemic on rugby league

== S ==
- SARS-CoV-2
  - Variants of SARS-CoV-2
- SARS-related coronavirus
- COVID-19 scams
- Impact of the COVID-19 pandemic on science and technology
- Scientific Advisory Group for the Origins of Novel Pathogens
- Shortages related to the COVID-19 pandemic
  - 2020–2023 global chip shortage
- Social distancing measures related to the COVID-19 pandemic
- Social impact of the COVID-19 pandemic
  - Social impact of the COVID-19 pandemic in the Republic of Ireland
  - Social impact of the COVID-19 pandemic in Malaysia
  - Social impact of the COVID-19 pandemic in New Zealand
  - Social impact of the COVID-19 pandemic in Russia
  - Social impact of the COVID-19 pandemic in the United Kingdom
  - Social impact of the COVID-19 pandemic in the United States
- Impact of the COVID-19 pandemic on social media
- Social stigma associated with COVID-19
- Impact of the COVID-19 pandemic on suicide rates
- Impact of the COVID-19 pandemic on sports
  - Impact of the COVID-19 pandemic on sports in the Republic of Ireland
  - Impact of the COVID-19 pandemic on Philippine sports
- Strikes during the COVID-19 pandemic
- Symptoms of COVID-19

== T ==
- Impact of the COVID-19 pandemic on the telehealth industry
- Impact of the COVID-19 pandemic on television
  - Impact of the COVID-19 pandemic on television in the United States
- COVID-19 testing
  - COVID-19 testing in the Republic of Ireland
  - COVID-19 testing in the United States
- Thank You NHS
- Timeline of the COVID-19 pandemic
- Impact of the COVID-19 pandemic on tourism
- Treatment and management of COVID-19

== U ==
- COVID-19 Pandemic Unemployment Payment
- Undercounting of COVID-19 pandemic deaths by country
- UK COVID-19 Inquiry
- 2020 United Kingdom school exam grading controversy
- United Nations response to the COVID-19 pandemic
- COVID-19 pandemic in U.S. immigration detention
- List of unproven methods against COVID-19

== V ==
- COVID-19 vaccine
- List of COVID-19 vaccine authorizations
- COVID-19 vaccine card
- COVID-19 vaccine clinical research
- Deployment of COVID-19 vaccines
- History of COVID-19 vaccine development
- COVID-19 vaccine misinformation and hesitancy
- Vaccine passports during the COVID-19 pandemic

== W ==
- Impact of the COVID-19 pandemic on the Walt Disney Company
- White House COVID-19 outbreak
- White House COVID-19 Response Team
- SARS-CoV-2 in white-tailed deer
- Wikipedia and the COVID-19 pandemic
- Workplace hazard controls for COVID-19
- World Health Organization response to the COVID-19 pandemic
  - World Health Organization response to the COVID-19 pandemic in Africa

== X ==
- Xenophobia and racism related to the COVID-19 pandemic

== Y ==
- None

== Z ==
- Zero-COVID
- Zoom fatigue
- Zoonotic origins of COVID-19

== # ==
- 17A
