= Impact of the COVID-19 pandemic on other health issues =

Health consequences of outbreak beyond the COVID-19 disease itself

The COVID-19 pandemic has had many impacts on global health beyond those caused by the COVID-19 disease itself. It has led to a reduction in hospital visits for other reasons. There have been 38 per cent fewer hospital visits for heart attack symptoms in the United States and 40 per cent fewer in Spain. The head of cardiology at the University of Arizona said, "My worry is some of these people are dying at home because they're too scared to go to the hospital." There is also concern that people with strokes and appendicitis are not seeking timely treatment. Shortages of medical supplies have impacted people with various conditions.

In several countries there has been a marked reduction of spread of sexually transmitted infections, including HIV/AIDS, attributable to COVID-19 quarantines, social distancing measures, and recommendations to not engage in casual sex. Similarly, in some places, rates of transmission of influenza and other respiratory viruses significantly decreased during the pandemic. In addition, the B/Yamagata lineage of influenza B might have become extinct in 2020/2021 due to COVID-19 pandemic measures, and there have been no naturally occurring cases confirmed since March 2020. In 2023, the World Health Organization concluded that protection against the Yamagata lineage was no longer necessary in the seasonal flu vaccine, reducing the number of lineages targeted by the vaccine from four to three.

The pandemic has also negatively impacted mental health globally, including increased loneliness resulting from social distancing and depression and domestic violence from lockdowns. As of June 2020, 40% of U.S. adults were experiencing adverse mental health symptoms, with 11% having seriously considered to attempt suicide. The research data suggest that the pandemic has negative effects on both weight loss and food health monitoring but the effects were short lived results.

Paying attention and taking measures to prevent mental health problems and post-traumatic stress syndrome, particularly in women, is already a need.

== Mental health ==
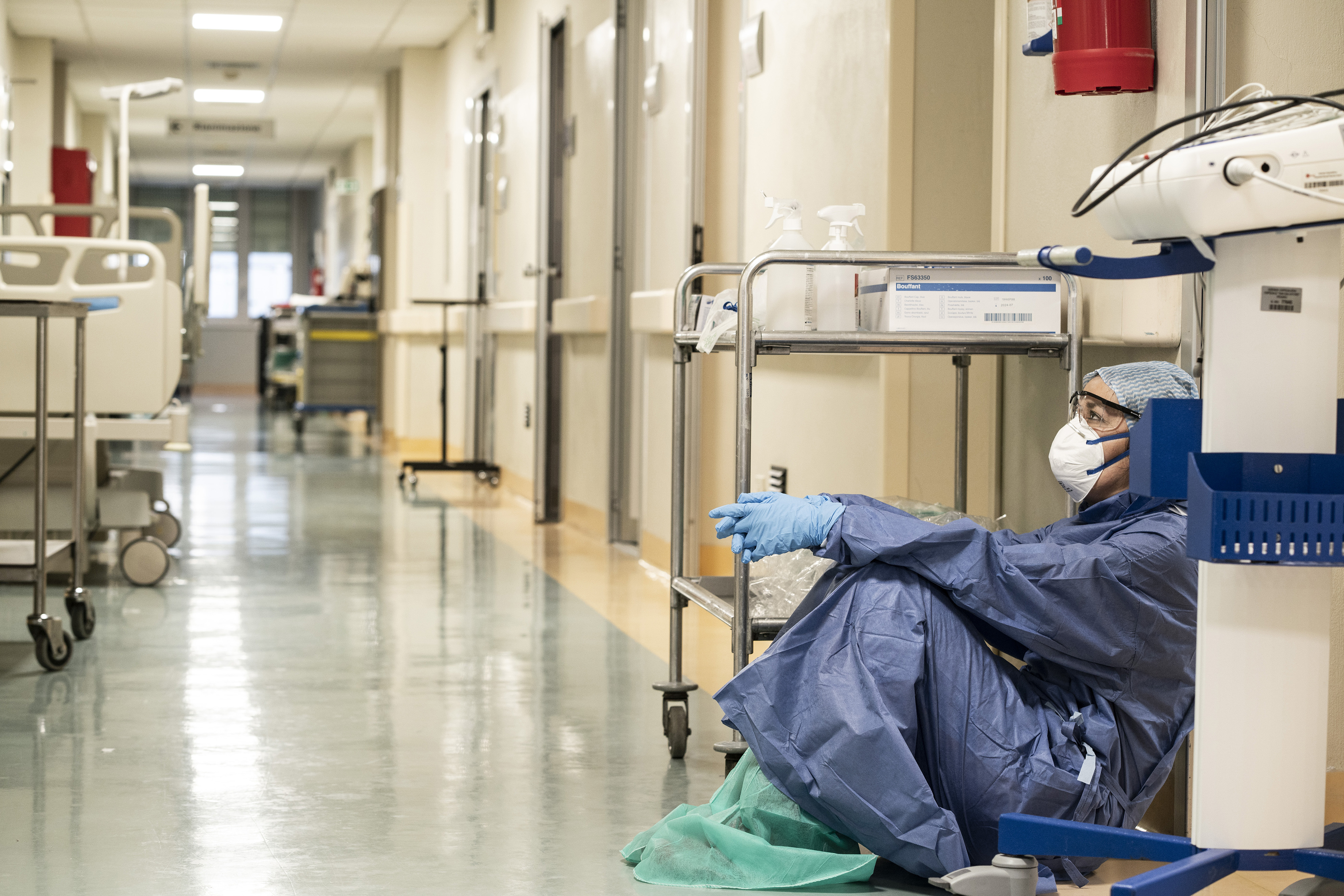
An exhausted anesthesiologist physician in Pesaro, Italy, March 2020

The COVID-19 pandemic has affected people's mental health all over the world. The pandemic has led to widespread feelings of anxiety, depression, and post-traumatic stress disorder symptoms. According to the UN health agency WHO, in the first year of the COVID-19 pandemic, prevalence of common mental health conditions, such as depression and anxiety, went up by more than 25 percent.

The pandemic has damaged social relationships, trust in institutions and in other people, has caused changes in work and income, and has imposed a substantial burden of anxiety and worry on the population. Women and young people face the greatest risk of depression and anxiety.

According to The Centers for Disease Control and Prevention study of Mental Health, Substance Use, and Suicidal Ideation During the COVID-19 Pandemic, "63 percent of young people reported experiencing substantial symptoms of anxiety and depression."

COVID-19 triggered issues caused by substance use disorders (SUDs). The pandemic disproportionately affects people with SUDs. The health consequences of SUDs (for example, cardiovascular diseases, respiratory diseases, type 2 diabetes, immunosuppression and central nervous system depression, and psychiatric disorders), and the associated environmental challenges (such as housing instability, unemployment, and criminal justice involvement), are associated with an increased risk for contracting COVID-19.

Confinement rules, along with unemployment and austerity measures implemented during and after the pandemic period, can significantly affect the illicit drug market and alter patterns of drug use among consumers.

Mitigation measures (i.e. physical distancing, quarantine, and isolation) can worsen loneliness, mental health symptoms, withdrawal symptoms, and psychological trauma.

== Childhood vaccinations ==
UNICEF estimates that 117 million children across 37 countries may not receive their immunizations in time to prevent a measles outbreak. Pediatricians in the United States are worried about childhood vaccination rates. In April, the CDC reported that 400,000 fewer doses of measles vaccine were ordered in 2020 compared to the same time last year.

== Mosquito-borne diseases ==
Although it is highly unlikely that COVID-19 can be transmitted by mosquitoes, the pandemic nevertheless has a large impact on the control of mosquito-borne diseases such as malaria or dengue fever. Reasons are disruptions in medical supply chains, patients avoiding hospitals, and halted mosquito control campaigns such as removal of breeding sites or distribution of insecticide treated bed nets.

== Maternal mortality ==
The United States, in particular, saw a 40 percent increase in maternal mortality in 2021, before returning to rates similar to prepandemic levels in 2022. Pregnancy-related conditions such as increased abdominal pressure and propensity for blood clots interacted negatively with SARS-CoV-2 infection, while viral damage to the placenta led to increased risk of dangerous conditions such as pre-eclampsia. Racial disparities were particularly acute, with Black women dying at 2.6 times the rate of white women and Native American and Alaska Native women dying at double the rate of white women in pregnancies from 2020 to 2021.

== Health insurance ==
Millions of Americans lost their health insurance as a result of losing their jobs. The Independent reported that Families USA "found that the spike in uninsured Americans – adding to an estimated 84 million people who are already uninsured or underinsured – is 39 per cent higher than any previous annual increase, including the most recent surge at the height of the recession between 2008 and 2009 when nearly 4 million non-elderly Americans lost insurance."

== Other respiratory diseases ==
In late 2022, during the first Northern Hemisphere autumn and winter seasons following the widespread relaxation of global public health measures, North America and Europe experienced a surge in respiratory viruses and coinfections in both adults and children. This formed the beginnings of the 2022–2023 pediatric care crisis and what some experts have termed a "tripledemic" of seasonal influenza, Respiratory Syncytial Virus (RSV), and SARS-CoV-2 throughout North America. In the United Kingdom, pediatric infections also began to spike beyond pre-pandemic levels, albeit with different illnesses, such as Group A streptococcal infection and scarlet fever. As of mid-December 2022, 19 children in the UK had died due to Strep A and the wave of infections had begun to spread into North America and Mainland Europe.

Populations had been exposed to these diseases lower-than-usual rates while masks were worn and social distancing was practiced, thus exhibiting weakened immune responses. Medical professionals have also posited that, since most children have had one or more SARS-CoV-2 infections by late 2022, COVID-19 may have affected children's immune systems in yet-to-be-determined ways. Research demonstrates patients infected with influenza as well as COVID are over twice as likely to die as patients with only COVID. The general public has been urged to get influenza vaccination as well as COVID vaccination.

== Recommendations ==
UNFPA recommends that governments maintain sexual and reproductive health and rights (SRHR) information and services, protect health workers and limit spread of COVID-19. This includes a comprehensive approach to SRHR information and services encompassing antenatal care (ANC), care during childbirth, postnatal care (PNC), contraception, safe abortion care, prevention, testing and treatment of HIV, where relevant, as well as sexually transmitted infections (STI), detection and treatment of GBV, and sexual health services and information.

== See also ==
- Mental health during the COVID-19 pandemic
- Impact of the COVID-19 pandemic on healthcare workers
- Impact of the COVID-19 pandemic on hospitals
- Impact of the COVID-19 pandemic on abortion in the United States
- Impact of the COVID-19 pandemic on long-term care facilities
