= COVID-19 pandemic baby bust =

Decrease in birth rates during the COVID-19 pandemic

The global economic recession caused by the outbreak of the COVID-19 pandemic first identified in December 2019 resulted in a significant decrease in birth rate, or "baby bust", in many countries.

All-time low birth rates were seen in Italy, Japan, South Korea, England, and Wales. France experienced its lowest birth rate since World War II. China's birth rate dropped by 15% in 2020. The United States saw a fall of 4% between 2019 and 2020 according to a report by the Centers for Disease Control and Prevention (CDC), its lowest since 1979.

== Causes ==
High-mortality events in general have been shown to result in a reduction in conception, as seen in birth rates nine months later. Lyman Stone in March 2020 suggested that the COVID-19 pandemic would cause a severe reduction in birth rate due to the disease's low case fatality rate, citing occasions on which high death rates motivate an increase in birth rate to replenish populations. A Brookings Institution report published in June 2020 projected a loss of 300,000 to 500,000 births in the United States, citing correlations between employment and birth rate as seen in the 2007–2008 Great Recession and general public health concerns as seen in the birth rate during the 1918 Spanish flu. Some initially suggested that lockdowns would beget a baby boom, likely based on myths of birth rate spikes seen nine months after events such as power outages and blizzards during which people are confined indoors.

== Statistics ==
The U.S. birth rate declined by 4% for both white and black women, 3% for Hispanic women, 6% for Native American women, and 8% for Asian American women. The birth rate of teenagers was affected most severely of any age group, falling by 8%, with a fall of 6% of women between 20 and 24 and a fall of 4.8% of women in their late 20s.
