= Nigerian government response to the COVID-19 pandemic =

The federal government of Nigeria has initially responded to the COVID-19 pandemic in the country with preventive measures to curb the spread of the coronavirus disease 2019 in the country.

== Timeline ==
=== 2020 ===
==== March ====
Early March, the minister of health in Nigeria, Osagie Ehanire, announced that 60 persons who had contact with the index Italian patient were under isolation, 40 persons in Ogun State and 20 in Lagos State.

On 1 March, four Chinese citizens were quarantined in Plateau State, they all tested negative the following day.

On 3 March, the governor of Lagos State, Babajide Sanwo-Olu disclosed that two foreign Nationals from an unnamed Asian country has tested negative to the virus.

On 6 March, the Anambra State government announced that five Chinese citizens tested negative for the virus. The Nigeria Centre for Disease Control reported that a total of 219 primary and secondary contacts of the index case had been identified and were being actively monitored.

On 9 March, the President Muhammadu Buhari established a Presidential Task Force for the control of the virus in the country.

On 10 March, Turkish Airlines cancelled all their flights to Nigeria due to the virus outbreak.

On 15 March, a woman in Enugu State displayed the symptoms of coronavirus, she tested negative the following day.

On 17 March, Nigeria postponed the 20th national sports festival that was supposed to hold in Benin City, Edo State from 22 March to 1 April.

On 18 March, the management of the National Youth Service Corps suspended the 2020 Batch A stream one 21 days orientation exercise indefinitely. The orientation exercise commenced on 10 March and was expected to end on 30 March, before it was suspended after just 8 days. Later the same day, Nigeria placed a travel ban on 13 countries with high cases of the virus, the countries are; United States, United Kingdom, South Korea, Switzerland, Germany, France, Italy, China, Spain, Netherlands, Norway, Japan and Iran. In Katsina State, a Nigerian citizen that returned from Malaysia displayed the symptoms of the virus, he tested negative the following day. Kano State government confirmed that three persons tested negative for the virus in the state. Lagos State government banned religious gatherings of over 50 worshippers for 30 days, Ogun State also banned any gathering of more than 50 people for 30 days. The New Afrika Shrine suspended all their programmes indefinitely. Kwara State and Lagos State announced the indefinite closure of their public and private schools, while Zamfara State, Sokoto State, Katsina State, Niger State, Kano State, Jigawa State, Kebbi State and Kaduna State also closed down their schools for 30 days from 23 March. The Nigeria Football Federation suspended all football activities for four weeks.

On 19 March, Anambra State government announced the closure of their schools and suspension of public gatherings indefinitely, tertiary institutions to close from 20 March, while primary and secondary schools to close from 27 March. Ogun State government extended an earlier ban to schools and religious centres in the state indefinitely. Federal government announced the closure of tertiary institutions, secondary and primary schools. Enugu State government also ordered the closure of all primary and secondary schools in the state from 27 March.

On 20 March, Nigeria extended their travel ban to two more countries, Sweden and Austria. Ekiti State government banned social, political, religious and family gatherings of more than 20 persons. The state also ordered the closure of all their schools from 23 March. Nigeria announced the closure of their international airports, Enugu, Port Harcourt and Kano airports from 21 March. Rivers State government also announced the closure of all their schools and directed the restriction of all religious activities. Osun State government banned any public gatherings of more than 50 persons in the state with immediate effect, including schools, churches and mosques. Delta State government announced the closure of all their schools from 26 March.

On 21 March, Nasarawa State government confirmed that five persons tested negative for the virus in the state. Kebbi State government announced the indefinite closure of all their primary and secondary schools. The Nigerian Railway Corporation also announced the suspension of all passenger services from 23 March. Lagos State government reduced the number of people allowed in any religious or social gathering from 50 to 20. Nigeria announced the closure of the remaining two international airports, Abuja and Lagos, from 23 March. Osun State reviewed their previous ban on public gatherings of more than 50 persons and changed it to a complete ban, enforcing it on all public gatherings in the state under any banner or organisation. Oyo State government ordered the closure of schools in the state. Bayelsa State government also ordered the closure of all schools in the state from 26 March and restriction of all public gatherings above 50 persons. Imo State government also announced the indefinite closure of all schools in their state with immediate effect.

On 22 March, Edo State government announced the closure of all their schools from 23 March.

On 23 March, Ebonyi State government banned all public gatherings in the state, including weddings, seminars, conferences, burials and any other large gatherings. Niger State government announced a shut down in the state, restricting movement from 8am to 8pm everyday, from 25 March. Kano State government suspended all gatherings in the state indefinitely. Rivers State government announced a partial lockdown in their state, closing cinemas, nights clubs, public parks, weddings, burials and religious worship centres from 24 March. Edo State announced an indefinite ban of any gathering of more than 50 people. The Chief Justice of Nigeria, Tanko Muhammad ordered all courts in Nigeria to shut down from 24 March. Nigeria ordered the closure of all land borders for four weeks and the suspension of Federal Executive Council, (FEC) meetings indefinitely. Anambra State government banned all public gatherings in the state with more than 30 persons, including weddings, festivals, funerals and clubs. The Independent National Electoral Commission announced suspension of all their activities for 14 days. Ondo State government banned all political, religious and social gatherings in the state for 14 days. Oyo State government also banned all social gatherings in the state with more than 30 persons, including religious services, parties, burials and weddings.

On 24 March, Yobe State government announced the closure of all their schools from 26 March. Joint Admissions and Matriculation Board suspended all their activities for two weeks. The Nigerian Senate adjourned plenary to 7 April, while the Nigerian House of Representatives adjourned indefinitely. Edo State government reduced the number of people allowed in any public gathering from 50 to 20, closing markets in the state and allowing only sellers of food items, medicines and other vital commodities to operate. Kaduna State government confirmed that three suspected persons tested negative for the virus in the state. Nasarawa State government ordered the indefinite closure of all their schools with immediate effect. Osun state government banned weekly markets indefinitely in the state. Lagos State government ordered the closure of stores and markets in the state from 26 March, allowing only sellers of food items, medicines, water and other essential commodities to operate. The National Examination Council announced an indefinite postponement of the 2020 common entrance examination into 104 Unity schools in Nigeria, which was supposed to hold on 28 March. Enugu State government banned all social and political gatherings in the state. Actors Guild of Nigeria banned movie sets across Nigeria. Delta State government banned all social gatherings of up to 20 persons, including burials, crusades and ordered the closure of clubs and cinemas with immediate effect. Ondo State government ordered the immediate closure of all markets, shops and malls in the state for seven days. The government also banned clubs, beer parlours and joints, except places where food, water and medicals are sold. Federal Capital Territory Administration ordered the immediate closure of shops in the markets and neighbourhood centres, except those selling food items, medicines and other essential commodities in the FCT. They also ordered the immediate closure of churches and mosques.

On 25 March, Rivers State government announced an indefinite closure of their sea, air and land borders into and out of the state with effect from 26 March. Kogi State government also announced an indefinite closure of their sea and land borders, suspending the activities of commercial motorcycle in the state with effect from 26 March. They also reduced the number of persons in any public gathering to 5. Ekiti State government banned the operations of markets in the state with the exception of those selling essential commodities like food items, water, medicine and medical equipments. Kwara State government ordered the ban of commercial transportation, closure of all mosques and churches and markets with exception of markets selling drugs, food items and other essential commodities. Kano State also announced an indefinite closure of their air and land borders into and out of the state with effect from 27 March. Bauchi State government also announced the closure of markets in the state from 26 March with the exception of those selling essential commodities like food items and medicine. Abia State government banned burial and wedding ceremonies of more than 30 guests. The state also banned religious activities of more than 50 persons for 30 days. Imo State government ordered the indefinite closure of major markets in the state with effect from 28 March. The government also closed its land borders, allowing entry upon screening. Delta State government announced the closure of their borders into and out of their state for two weeks in the first instance. The government announced the closure of Asaba airport with effect from 27 March; land borders with effect from 29 March; malls, supermarkets, markets and shops with effect from 1 April, ordering food sellers to conduct their businesses within the precinct of their homes. The government also directed all residents to stay at home with effect from 1 April. The government announced that the restrictions do not apply to providers of essential services like; security healthcare, directing pharmacies to remain open, water services, fire services, power services, essential departments of media houses and telecommunications companies. Governor Yahaya Bello of Kogi state stated in a video on his Facebook page which later went viral that "90% of the noise about covid-19 is for Political, Economic, and Financial Material gain". He furthered that the other 10% is for ordinary flu like the common colds Nigerians generally suffer.

On 26 March, Ebonyi State government announced the closure of their state borders from 28 March, allowing only vehicles carrying food items, construction materials, medical supplies and patients going for treatment. Federal government ordered the immediate closure of international airports and land borders in the country for a period of four weeks. Rivers State government announced an indefinite closure of all markets in the state from 28 March. Jigawa State government ordered the indefinite closure of their state borders from 27 March. Akwa Ibom State government ordered the closure of their state borders, except for the transportation of food items. The state government also directed their workers to stay at home for a week starting from 30 March. The government also announced that their state-owned airline, Ibom Air, would suspend all its flight operations from 29 March. Kaduna State government placed a dusk-to-dawn curfew on the state, ordering residents to stay in their homes with immediate effect, except workers in essential services like; health workers, the fire service and security personnel. The government also ordered the closure of all businesses, offices and places of worship, banning wedding events and all social gatherings. Sokoto State government announced the closure of their state borders for two weeks from 27 March, with the exception of vehicles transporting food and essential medical commodities. Federal Capital Territory Administration restricted business and commercial activities in the territory to 15 hours daily, starting from 9pm and ending 6am.

On 27 March, Oyo State government placed a dusk-to-dawn curfew on the state, banning inter-state travel from and into the state, except vehicles carrying food items, medical, pharmaceutical and petroleum products from 29 March, while also reducing the number of people allowed in a social gathering from 30 to 10. The state also announced that all markets will be closed except those selling perishable food items from 29 March. Osun State government announced the closure of their state borders from 28 March. The state government all announced the closure of their major markets as well as shopping malls, with the exception of pharmaceutical, foods and medical needs outlets. Katsina State government announced the closure of their state borders from 28 March, allowing only fuel takers and vehicles conveying food items and other essential commodities, but with subject to screening and testing at the point of entry. Enugu State government announced an indefinite closure of their state borders and inter-state transportation in the state from 31 March, allowing only those on medical emergency services. Nasarawa State government banned all social and religious gatherings of more than 50 persons, including weddings, churches services and mosque prayers with immediate effect. The state government also announced the restriction of all movement into the state. Niger State government banned the intra and inter-state movement of people and vehicles, exempting only vehicles carrying food items, fuel, medical supplies and other essential services. Zamfara State government announced the closure of their state borders with effect from 28 March. Bayelsa State government announced an immediate closure of their sea and land borders into and out of the state.

On 28 March, Anambra State government announced the closure of their 63 major markets from 31 March, for a period of two weeks, allowing only food items and medicine markets. Abia State government announced a four weeks closure of their state borders and markets from 1 April, directing residents to stay at home and allowing only food sellers to operate. Imo State government announced an indefinite ban on all weddings, burial ceremonies and religious activities with immediate effect. The state government also directed all civil and public servants to stop work immediately, except those on approved essential services. Ogun State government announced the closure of their state borders for two weeks in the first instance from 29 March, allowing only vehicles conveying personnel involved in essential services such as security agencies, health workers, food, medical items and petroleum products. Cross River State government banned all religious gatherings of more than five persons in the state. Kebbi State government announced the restriction of all entries into and out of the state with immediate effect. Taraba State government announced the closure of their state borders with effect from 29 March, restricting movement in and out of their state.

On 29 March, Ekiti State government placed a dusk-to-dawn curfew on the state, closing the state borders and banning inter-state travel from and into the state for 14 days, except vehicles carrying food items, medical, petroleum products and other essential goods from 30 March, while also ordering residents to stay at home, except those on essential services. The government also ordered the closure of all businesses, offices and places of worship. Anambra State government announced the closure of River Niger Bridge with immediate effect, allowing only vehicles transporting food items and medicines. Federal government announced the locking down of Lagos State, Ogun State and the FCT, for a period of two weeks from 11pm on 30 March, ordering the citizens of the affected areas to stay in their homes, banning travel to or from other states and announcing the shutdown of businesses and offices, exempting hospitals, food processing, petroleum distribution, banks, power generation and private security companies. The government also exempted workers in telecommunication companies, broadcasters, print and electronic media staff who could not become remote workers. The federal government also suspended the movements of all passenger aircraft all over the country, including commercial and private jets. Osun State government announced the total lockdown of their state from 31 March, banning movement of individuals and inter-state movements, allowing only those on essential duties to operate, such as health personnel, fire service, security personnel, environmental officials, power and water supply agencies, media and telecommunication officers. The state also permitted pharmaceutical and medical outfits to open.

On 30 March, Adamawa State government announced the closure of their state borders for 14 days with effect from 31 March, ordering a total lockdown in the state. The state government also announced that the ban affects tricycle, taxis and bus operators throughout the state. The state government also banned social activities and ordered the closure of all markets, except food markets, medicine markets and filling stations, directing banks to provided skeletal services. The lockdown of Ogun State that was supposed to start from 30 March, was shifted to commence from 3 April, after the state government made a request to the federal government to allow them provide food for their residents.

On 31 March, Bauchi State government announced the closure of their state borders for 14 days with effect from 2 April, ordering a total lockdown in the state and exempting essential services. Kwara State government announced an indefinite closure of their state borders with immediate effect, exempting only vehicles carrying agricultural produce, medical equipments and officials on essential duties. Delta State government reviewed the earlier closure of their state borders and restriction of movement for their residents and announced the exemption of those involved in the transportation of essential supplies such as; food, water, petroleum products, pharmaceutical products and other essential services, noting that banks were to remain open only for skeletal services. Bayelsa State government also reviewed the earlier closure of their state borders with the exemption of vehicles transporting food, drugs and the vehicles conveying personnel on essential duty. There is concern that with closure of public places in Lagos, many persons might have much difficulty making a living and providing food for themselves and children. There is also concern that if persons return to family farms in the countryside they may unknowingly transmit coronavirus to older relatives.

==== April ====
On 1 April, Taraba State government announced the banning of all public gatherings of more than 20 persons in the state. The state government also ordered the closure of all markets with immediate effect, except those providing essential services such as; pharmacies, food stores and petrol service stations. Ondo State government announced the closure of their state borders with effect from 2 April, prohibiting inter-state travels into the state.

On 2 April, Bauchi State government reversed the total lockdown in the state. Akwa Ibom State government announced an indefinite lockdown of their state, directing residents to stay at home, closing all business premises, markets, shops, motor parks and offices, allowing only grocery shops, pharmacies and those on essential services to operate.

On 5 April, Niger State government relaxed their restriction order with immediate effect, restricting movement from 2 pm to 10pm and allowing movement from 8am to 2pm every day.

On 9 April, Kwara State government announced the total lockdown of their state for 14 days from 10 April, exempting vehicles carrying goods and services. The state government allowed markets selling foods and medications to open on Mondays, Wednesdays and Fridays, between 10 am and 2 pm.

On 11 April, Anambra State government announced an immediate lockdown of their state for 14 days, directing residents to stay at home and allowing only those on essential services to move around. Niger State government announced the lockdown of their state from 13 April, exempting those on essential services.

On 13 April, federal government extended the lockdown of Lagos State, Ogun State and the FCT, for another two weeks from 11pm on 13 April. Ekiti State extended their state lockdown for another 14 days.

On 14 April, Delta and Osun States extended their state lockdown for another 14 days. Kano State announced the total lockdown of their state for seven days from 16 April, ordering residents to stay at home, closing all markets, places of worship and public gatherings in state.

On 17 April, at least 18 people in Nigeria have been killed by security forces during the enforcement of measures to curb the spread of the virus.

On 20 April, Nigeria extended the closure of airports to another 2 weeks. Borno State government announced a 14 days lockdown of their state from 22 April, restricting movement of individuals, banning public gatherings and allowing providers of essential services.

On 21 April, Taraba State government announced a total lockdown of their state from 22 April, restricting movement of individuals and vehicles and allowing workers on essential duties, such as health workers, pharmaceutical shops, fuel stations and media houses.

On 23 April, Kwara State government extended their lockdown for another two weeks.

On 25 April, Anambra State government lifted their lockdown.

On 26 April, Kaduna State government extended their state lockdown for 30 days.

On 27 April, federal government announced the locking down of Kano State, for a period of two weeks with immediate effect. The government also extended the locking down of Lagos State, Ogun State and the FCT, for a period of one week, announcing an indefinite nationwide curfew from 8 pm to 6 am starting on 4 May, while also placing an indefinite ban on non-essential inter-state passenger travel, allowing partial and controlled interstate movement of goods and services, announcing the mandatory use of face masks or coverings in public places and extending the ban on social and religious gatherings. Anambra State government announced the reopening of their 63 major markets from 4 May.

On 28 April, Delta State government announced the relaxing of their lockdown from 30 April.

==== May ====
On 8 May, Abia State government announced the relaxing of their lockdown from 11 May.

On 18 May, the federal government extended the locking down of Kano State for another two weeks, while also extending the nationwide curfew for another two weeks.

==== June ====
On 1 June, the federal government relaxed the lockdown imposed on Kano State and the ban placed on religious gatherings and banking operations for a period of four weeks, while also announcing the re-opening of domestic airline operations from 21 June. The federal government shortened the curfew from 10 pm to 4 am.

On 29 June, the federal government lifted the ban placed on inter-state travels and announced the re-opening of schools for only graduating students, effective from 1 July.

=== 2021 ===
==== January ====
In January 2021, it was reported that despite several victims’ narrations, many Nigerians still believe the virus is a scam, while a few others who believed lived with the insinuation that the cases recorded in the first wave of the pandemic was inflated to get funds and grants for states to enrich some officials through contracts award. Social distancing, important in the early days of the virus, has also been jettisoned as more people congregate in public places without adhering to the health requirements.

== See also ==
- National responses to the COVID-19 pandemic in Africa
