= Impact of the COVID-19 pandemic on funerals =

The impact of the COVID-19 pandemic on funerals, as with the impact of COVID-19 on ICUs, is a burgeoning stressor on the funeral industry necessitating changes in its own logistics, and more particularly within its ambit on ritual in general. The CDC has provided broad guidelines.
