= Glossary of the COVID-19 pandemic =

The glossary of the COVID-19 pandemic is a list of definitions of terms relating to the COVID-19 pandemic. The pandemic has created and popularized many terms relating to disease and videoconferencing.

== A ==
Anthropause

The global reduction of modern human activity, especially travel.
Artificial immunity
Immunity resulting from a vaccine or other immune-generating substance.
Asymptomatic transmission

The spread of a contagious illness by those without symptoms, or before the appearance of symptoms.

== B ==
Booster dose

An extra administration of a vaccine following an earlier dose.

== C ==
Chinese virus
A term for COVID-19 used by former United States president Donald Trump to emphasize that the pandemic started in China.
Comirnaty

The commercial name for the FDA approved COVID-19 vaccine from Pfizer, released August 21, 2021. It also has several other names or designators used on the actual vials.
Community transmission

The spread of a contagious disease to an individual with no known contact with other infected populations.
Contact tracing

The process of identification of persons who may have come into contact with an infected person.
Covidiot

A person who ignores safety guidelines, potentially spreading COVID-19.
COVID-19 lockdowns

Governmental safety interventions meant to minimize the spread of COVID-19.
Cytokine Storm

A term used to describe an excessive immune response resulting in multiple organ failure.

== D ==
Doomscrolling

Endlessly scrolling through bad news especially social media, to the detriment of the reader's mental health.

== E ==
Essential worker

An employee who provides essential services to the public.

== F ==
Flattening the curve

A public health strategy to slow down the spread of a virus involving voluntary and involuntary restrictions on social interactions. Also called "plank the curve".
Flurona

A portmanteau of "flu" and "corona" referring to a double infection of coronavirus and influenza strains.
Fomite

An object or surface that may contain an infectious virus or bacteria that can be a means of transmission.

== H ==
Herd immunity

A term to describe when a high percentage of a defined population is immune to a disease because of vaccination or prior exposure to a disease.
Heterologous vaccination

Combining different brands or types of vaccines, instead of getting multiple doses of the same vaccine. This may be done for practical reasons such as a vaccine shortage or in the hope of a better response.
Host cell

A cell in the body that becomes invaded by a virus and then acts as a host to produce more virus particles.
Hygiene theater

The practice of taking hygiene measures intended to give the illusion of improved health safety while actually doing little to reduce any risk.

== I ==
Immunity

The capability of multicellular organisms to resist harmful microorganisms.
Incubation period

The time it takes for an individual who is infected with a disease to start showing symptoms.

== L ==
Long-hauler

A term used to describe individuals who contracted COVID-19 and exhibit symptoms for an extended period of time compared to the majority of the recovered population.

== M ==
Maskne

A portmanteau of "mask" and "acne" referring to acne and other rashes of the face that occur in association with mask wearing.

== N ==
Nasopharyngeal swab
A swab with a soft tip used for collecting nostril respiratory mucosa samples from the back of the nose.
Natural immunity
Immunity derived from a prior infection.

== O ==
Oropharyngeal swab
A swab with a soft tip used for collecting nostril respiratory mucosa samples from the back of the throat.

== P ==
PCR test

An acronym for a "polymerase chain reaction test" that determines if a sample contains genetic material from a virus.

== Q ==
Quarantini

Virtual happy hour.

== R ==
R0

Pronounced "R-naught" or "R-zero"; a measurement used to describe the intensity of an outbreak.

== S ==
Serology test

Also called an "antibody test" is used to determine if an individual had been infected with a virus in the past by testing for antibodies in the bloodstream.
Seroprevalence

The number of people in which antibodies to a disease have been detected in a specific population.
Social distancing

Also called "physical distancing" is the practice of keeping a certain distance from other people, in order to stop a disease from spreading.
Superspreader

Or "superspreading event" is a person or event that infects a large number of people with a contagious disease.

== T ==
Twindemic

A portmanteau of "twin" and "pandemic" referring to simultaneous cases of the flu and COVID-19.

== V ==
Viral load

Also called "viral dose" refers to the amount of a virus an individual has been exposed to including biological and environmental specimens.

== Z ==
Zero-COVID

A suppression strategy that involves using public health measures such as contact tracing, mass testing, and border quarantine and lockdowns.
Zoonotic

A term used to describe a disease originating in animals that has mutated to infect humans.
Zoom

A brand of videoconferencing software popularized during the pandemic.
Zoom fatigue

Fatigue associated with the overuse of virtual platforms of communication such as videoconferencing.
Zoombombing

Unwanted members joining a Zoom call.
Zoomland
The proverbial place video teleconferences, particularly using the software Zoom, take place. It was used when video teleconferencing software Zoom became an increasingly common way to communicate.
