= Impact of the COVID-19 pandemic on foster care in the United States =

Under normal circumstances, the United States child welfare systems is considered by experts to be underfunded and strains social workers with high case loads. However, during the 2020 COVID-19 pandemic, the U.S. experienced an unprecedented lockdown and national unemployment reached a record high. This presents an issue because it is recorded that during times of economic stress, child abuse skyrockets.

A prime example of this occurred in the Dallas–Fort Worth area, which already witnessed a major uptick in abuse rates. Six children, all under the age of 4, were physically abused, as reported by Cook Children's Medical Center in Fort Worth. Doctors believe all of these cases were driven by coronavirus- related stress. In the age of COVID-19, where families were locked inside their homes, human contact was limited, and courts closed, the United States witnessed an aggressive upsurge in child abuse rates as a result of several systemic flaws.

== Identification ==
Identifying and reporting child maltreatment is the first step in all child welfare system work. It is how the child's mistreatment comes to the attention of authorities and, from there, action is taken. One of the biggest mechanisms the system has traditionally relied on has been mandatory reporters, such as teachers, law enforcement, and health care professionals. A child's regular contact with their community has been relied on for individuals to be able to identify and report abuse. Upon the national quarantine, fewer cases began to be reported. An illustration of this may be seen in the U.S. Midwest. Prior to 2020, Illinois abuse hotline typically received about 950 calls a day, approximately 6,650 a week. After Governor Pritzker closed schools, that number dropped by 45% within the week.

The problems stemming from closures is not limited to America. In England, Anne Longfield, the Children's Commissioner for England, estimated that over 2.3 million minors in England are currently at high-risk for abuse and unable to access social services as a result of the COVID-19 outbreak.

== Lack of youth resources ==
Outside of the child welfare system, another crucial element that contributes to offsetting child neglect is that schools continue to be some of the only places many youth receive mental-health help, physical activity, nourishment and clean water. More than six million students across 11,000 American schools are the primary provider of critical services and, until now, relied on schools for those resources. Kindship Care is another resource child welfare agencies are trying to utilize more during the pandemic. Better outcomes have been observed in children that are quickly placed with members of their extended family.

== Impact on the investigation process ==
The next step in child welfare work is investigating and intervening. The current foster care system in the U.S. operates on worker mobility, human contact and the frequent movement of children. However, with that movement grinding to a halt after the lockdown, caseworkers are limited in their ability to monitor and investigate potential cases of abuse.

The U.S. Children's Bureau evaluated alternatives to caseworker inspections, while many state and local governments began limiting or canceling abuse allegation investigations. One of the most extreme measures was Maine's Office of Child and Family Services suspending all caseworker home visits; many agencies and social workers were worried about contracting or transmitting the virus and as a result they conducted investigations from the front doors of homes or over video chats.

== Effects on housing and visitation ==
Another element of this is the housing of children already in foster care. Major cities around the world witnessed a serious contraction in available foster housing because many foster parents and facilities run by older or immune compromised individuals have not been operating during the pandemic. In-person visitations between family members during a separation is recognized as important for both the parent(s) and the child; however, similar to home inspections, separated families transitioned to virtual visitations.

== Family courts ==
One of the final steps in a child welfare case is that of courts establishing a long-term solvency plan. This could include a variety of solutions from reunification to the revocation of custody, all dependent on the individual case. However, because of the long-term impacts of this final step, during COVID-19, experts have worried about the legal backlog and pileup. Children currently in foster care (and any children taken under lockdown) because of alleged abuse or neglect require a trial, but many trials and meeting dates have been delayed indefinitely. A prime example of this is in Los Angeles County, one of the largest counties in the United States, where all non-essential work was suspended, including family courts.
