= Social impact of the COVID-19 pandemic in Russia =

This article is about the social impact of the COVID-19 pandemic in Russia.

== Event cancellations ==
On 5 March, First Deputy Prime Minister Andrey Belousov announced the cancellation of the St. Petersburg International Economic Forum which was due to be held from 3 to 6 June 2020.

On 11 March, Russian Defence Minister Sergey Shoygu cancelled the Moscow International Security Conference which had been scheduled for 22 to 23 April.

On 17 March, TASS reported that all football, hockey and basketball games were suspended until 10 April. This was later extended to 31 May. On the same day, UEFA confirmed postponing Euro 2020 until summer 2021, one of the venues of which is Krestovsky Stadium in Saint Petersburg.

Despite the fact that a conscription started on 1 April, conscripts won't be sent to duty stations until 20 May.

On 16 April, President Putin postponed the 2020 Victory Day Parade. On 26 May, President Putin announced that the 2020 Victory Day Parade would be held on 24 June, coinciding with the Moscow Victory Parade of 1945.

On 20 July, organisers for the "Immortal Regiment" march postponed the event to 9 May 2021.

== Religious services and organisations ==
On 17 March, the leadership of the Russian Orthodox Church published Instructions to rectors of parishes and monasteries’ town churches, abbots and abbesses of the monasteries of the Russian Orthodox Church over the threat of spreading coronavirus infection (in English), which said it had been approved by the ROC's Holy Synod and instructed the ROC's clergy to use disposable cups, gloves, and facial tissue during sacraments and celebrations, disinfect church plates and premises regularly, and refrain from offering the hand for kissing. A nearly identical Russian-language Instructions were addressed to the clergy of the Moscow diocese and said it had been approved by the Patriarch of Moscow and all Rus'. When in St. Petersburg attendance of places of worship was restricted for the public on 26 March, the Moscow Patriarchate's lawyer deemed it unlawful.

On 29 March, the ROC's Patriarch Kirill delivered a sermon in the Cathedral of Christ the Saviour that urged people to refrain from visiting church, citing the life of St. Mary of Egypt. On 3 April, Kirill issued an encyclical for the clergy and faithful of the "dioceses in the territory of the Russian Federation" urging the clergy to conduct church services without laypeople's presence. As the city of Moscow decided to tighten lockdown measures starting from 13 April, and following a request from chief sanitary doctor of Moscow, the Patriarch's Vicar instructed that church services in the city diocese be held without public (laypeople). A similar decision was taken in St. Petersburg. As of 16 April 2020, according to RBK, 42 out of 85 federal subjects including Moscow, Moscow Oblast and Saint Petersburg, issued instructions to close places of worship for general public, which would extend into the Easter period, which in the Orthodox Church was to begin on 19 April. Equivocation and occasionally contradictory instructions issued by the Moscow Patriarchate's top officials undermined the authority of the Church's leadership while restrictive measures caused opposition on the part of conservative circles of the ROC's congregation. On Easter Sunday, the degree of admission restrictions, if any, to religious ceremonies varied significantly from region to region (federal subject), the ROC's branches outside the RF territory given free rein to find appropriate arrangement with local authorities. While Patriarch Kirill presided over the Easter night service in Moscow's cathedral church with no laypeople in attendance, the ROC's most venerated St Trinity monastery in the Moscow region, which is under the Patriarch's direct spiritual authority, defied his directions by conducting Easter services as normal. This and similar incidents in other major monasteries led to massive spread of the COVID-19 infection in a number of the ROC's monasteries and seminaries in Russia as well as in Belarus and Ukraine.

Various Muslim communities closed their mosques. In Moscow, the Cathedral Mosque, the Old Mosque, and the Memorial Mosque on Poklonnaya Hill closed on 18 March. On 23 March, mosques in Crimea and Sevastopol were shut down. On the next day, all the mosques in Krasnodar Krai and Adygea were closed as well. Same measures were planned in Dagestan.

On 18 March, Rabbi Berel Lazar closed the Bolshaya Bronnaya Synagogue, Maryina Roshcha Synagogue, and Zhukovka Jewish Centre. Eleven members of the community were hospitalised, with four COVID-19 cases confirmed, the first one being a rabbi who felt sick after Purim celebration on 9 March. On 24 March, Rabbi Berel Lazar and the Federation of Jewish Communities recommended that all synagogues to close down and the community centres and Jewish schools switch to distance education.

== Attribution ==
text was copied from 2020_coronavirus_pandemic_in_Russia on February 1, 2021. Please see the history of that page for full attribution.
