= Impact of the COVID-19 pandemic on consumer products =

The COVID-19 pandemic resulted in an immediate decrease in the number of product offerings by consumer goods manufacturers, and change in business decision making by many producers that the Wall Street Journal said was likely to be long-term.

== Background ==
Consumer goods producers had for decades been increasing the variety of options in order to offer something that would appeal to the largest percentage of consumers. According to the Wall Street Journal, "Executives told investors that, by putting a token salad on every fast-food chain menu or stocking a detergent for extra-sensitive skin, they could cater to the whims of more people in a family or group of friends or co-workers." Creating multiple versions of a product in order to serve as many customer niches as possible and satisfy demand from retailers for custom packaging was a common business strategy.

Since the 1980s, Lay's had gone from producing 4 varieties of chips to 60 and Campbell's from producing around 100 varieties of soup to nearly 400. According to the Food Industry Association, the average food retailer carried around 9,000 items in 1975 and more than 30,000 by the late 2010s.

== Causes ==
Decreases in the number of offerings, often in response to panic buying and to supply and manufacturing limitations due to the shutdowns, happened within months. By decreasing the number of product lines, manufacturers, producers, and other providers could streamline production and distribution.

== Pandemic-era cuts ==
IGA stores in the US reported going from offering an average of 40 toilet paper choices to only 4. Georgia-Pacific stopped producing 164-sheet rolls of Quilted Northern toilet paper and switched production to 328-sheet rolls.

Outback Steakhouse reduced its menu offerings by 40%. Darden Restaurants, which owns Olive Garden, LongHorn Steakhouse, Bahama Breeze, Seasons 52, Yard House and Cheddar's, reduced its menu offerings, citing the reduced expense and prep work as one of the few upsides of the pandemic in the restaurant industry. McDonald's removed about 100 items from menus, including bagels and salads, and reported that average wait time in drive-throughs had decreased by 25 seconds because of the streamlining and that customer surveys indicated food quality had increased and incorrect orders had decreased. Red Robin reported faster service and less waste after it cut menu items.

Coca-Cola cut its number of offerings by half, from 400 pre-COVID to 200 by 2024, including discontinuing its 60-year-old brand Tab.

Grocers reported cost savings due to fewer items to keep in stock and reduced food waste. Industry analysts said the reduction in variety was most likely to hurt small producers who had relied on retailers' desire to fulfill niche consumer needs.

== Long-term effects ==
According to the Wall Street Journal in 2024, many of the reduced offerings became permanent; it reported that "retailers and suppliers across industries—from groceries to health, beauty and furniture—have said that it didn’t pay to offer products for everyone, and consumers didn’t care that much when they stopped." According to the Harvard Business Review in 2020, producers should "reconsider the pros and cons of producing numerous product variations".

Kimberly Clarke, which reduced the variety of offerings by 70% during the pandemic, had only restarted production on about half of those by 2024.

Industry analysts said the permanent reduction in variety was most likely to hurt small producers who had relied on retailers' desire to fulfill niche consumer needs.
