= Economic impact of the COVID-19 pandemic in Russia =

The COVID-19 pandemic in Russia had an economic impact.

== Timeline ==
=== February–March 2020 ===
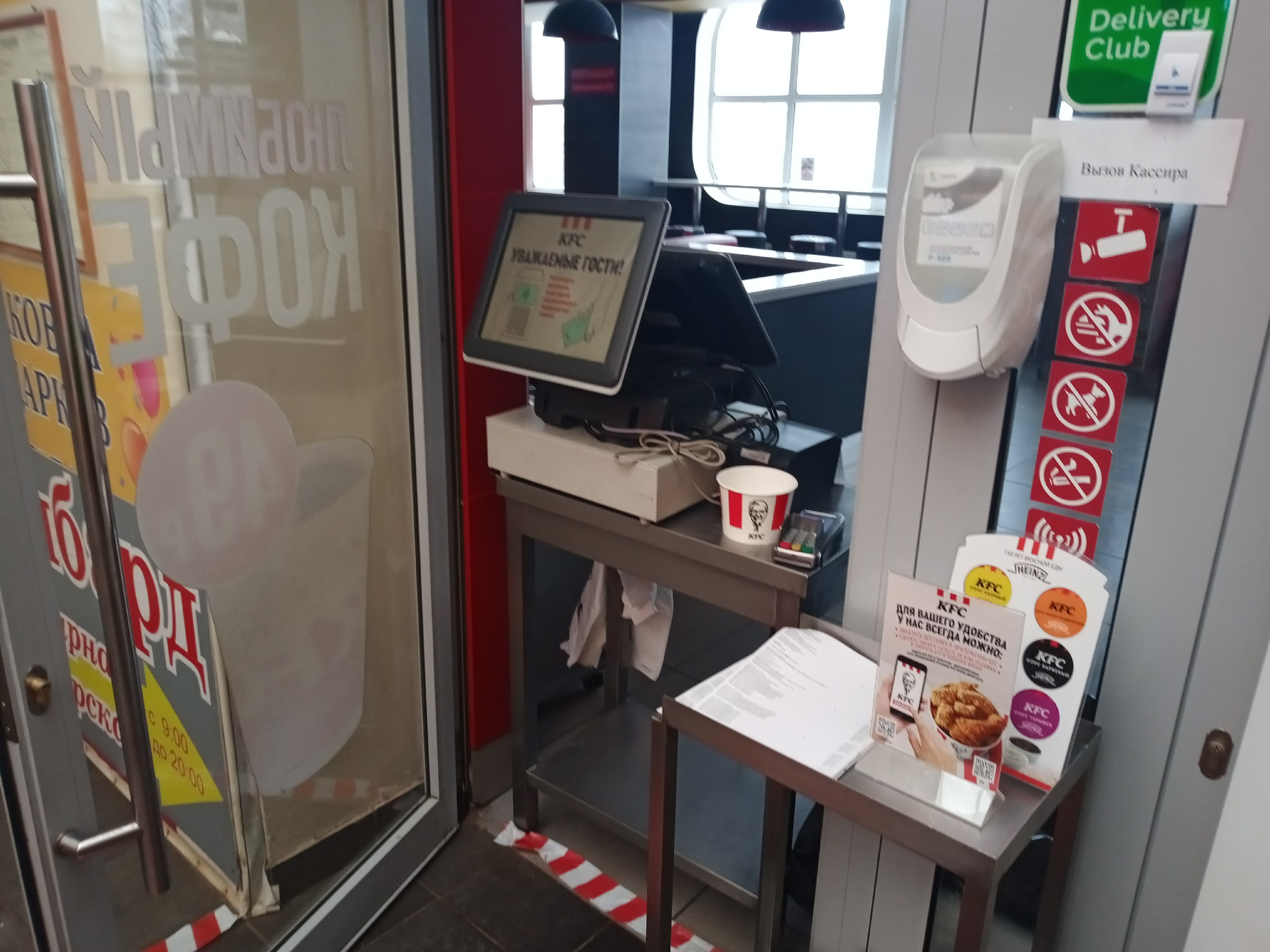
KFC restaurant in Pushkino, Moscow Oblast switched to a take-away regime.

On 20 February, Minister of Finance Anton Siluanov said Russia is losing around 1 billion rubles each day because of decreased trade with China.

On 5 March, the head of the Russian Association of Tour Operators said Russia's tourism sector had already taken a 27 billion ruble hit from the impact of the coronavirus.

As a result of the pandemic, factory output and transportation demand fell, bringing overall demand for oil down as well, and causing oil prices to fall. This triggered an OPEC summit in Vienna on 5 March. At the summit, OPEC agreed to cut oil production by an additional 1.5 million barrels per day through the second quarter of the year. OPEC called on Russia and other non-OPEC members of OPEC+ to abide by the OPEC decision. On 6 March, Russia rejected the demand, marking the end of the partnership, with oil prices falling 10% after the announcement. On 8 March, Saudi Arabia initiated an oil price war with Russia, triggering a major fall in the price of oil around 30%. The price war is one of the major causes of the currently ongoing global stock market crash. As the result of the oil price falling, the Russian ruble suffered a fall hitting a four-year low against the U.S. dollar.

On 17 March, First Deputy Minister of Transport and Federal Air Transport Agency head Alexander Neradko said cancellation of international flights during the pandemic threatens to bankrupt multiple Russian airlines. Russian airlines lost an estimated 1.7 billion rubles due to the cancellation of flights to China in February. According to Neradko, airlines could lose another 100 billion rubles in revenues by the end of the year.

On 23 March, Russia's federal list of "systemically important" companies was expanded to three times, featuring about 600 businesses. According to Vedomosti, the updated list includes new airlines (Rossiya, S7, Utair), airports (Moscow Domodedovo, Saint Petersburg Pulkovo), grocery chains (Vkusvill, Auchan), fast food chains (McDonald's, Burger King), and retail shops (Sportmaster, IKEA).

On 24 March, Mayor of Moscow Sergey Sobyanin issued orders to support businesses which include postponing payments on organisations’ property and land taxes, deferring rental payments, reducing payments fixed in trading contracts and extending the deadlines for paying trade fees. On 25 March, President of Russia Vladimir Putin announced following measures for microenterprises, small- and medium-sized businesses: deferring tax payments (except Russia's value-added tax) for the next six months, cutting the size of social security contributions in half, deferring social security contributions, deferring loan repayments for the next six months, a six-month moratorium on fines, debt collection, and creditors’ applications for bankruptcy of debtor enterprises. Additionally, a new tax on income from large deposits will be introduced in 2021, and the tax on offshores will be increased. On 27 March, the Association of Banks of Russia reported an increase of deposits closure.

On 25 March, associations of companies of online shopping, retail, culinary, and nine other industries sent a letter to Prime Minister Mishustin, in which they warned of a possible collapse of their businesses and asked for numerous additional measures of support. On 26 March, a petition signed by publishing houses and bookshops pleading for support was published.

On 30 March, owners of hotels and restaurants asked the government for 1-year tax deferral and other fiscal measures.

=== April–May 2020 ===
On 1 April, nearly 1.4 trillion rubles had been earmarked for fighting the virus and the pandemic's economic impact.

Aeroflot′s low-cost carrier Pobeda Airlines announced it would stop flights on 1 April until 31 May.

Sberbank and VTB Bank with backing from the Central Bank will start offering six-month, interest-free loans to businesses to help them pay employee salaries.

The Eurasian Economic Union will ban export of the onions, garlics, turnips, rye, rice, buckwheat, proso millets, groats, whole-wheat flour, granules of cereal grain, pealed buckwheat grain, buckwheat ready meals, soybeans, sunflower seeds from 10 April to 30 June.

On 14 April 2020, the International Monetary Fund projected Russia's real GDP growth rate to be −5.5% for 2020 in what it called "The Great Lockdown". International ratings agency Moody's said in late April that it expected Russia's GDP to decline by 5.5% in 2020, with it growing by 2.2% in 2021.

On 16 April, Minister of Economic Development Maxim Reshetnikov said that Russia is set to spend over 2 trillion rubles to counter the pandemic's effects.

On 24 April, the Central Bank of Russia cut its key interest rate by 50 basis points to 5.5%.

On 18 May, the Federal Air Transport Agency said that it allocated 7.89 billion rubles to Aeroflot as a partial compensation for losses due to the pandemic. It said it would consider applications from 6 more companies. Overall, the government had allocated 23.4 billion rubles to compensate for losses to airlines.

=== June–July 2020 ===
On 2 June, Prime Minister Mishustin said that the government would launch a 5 trillion ruble ($73 billion) recovery plan in the next month to counteract against the pandemic's economic effects. The program would last until the end of 2021 with the target of bringing the unemployment rate back to under 5% and economic growth of 2.5% a year. It was reported that the plan would include greater daily spending from the federal budget and lost tax revenues, and that the recovery package could overall be worth 7.3 trillion rubles ($106 billion) once long-term infrastructure projects, which isn't counted against the regular annual budget, are included. Mishustin said that the program was divided into 3 stages consisting of "stabilisation" (until end of 2020), "recovery" (until mid 2021) and "growth" from Q4 of 2021. It also outlines structural changes to labour regulations, including a new hourly minimum wage to support part-time work, encourage employment and decrease the size of the shadow economy. It is also planned to increase real wage growth by 2.5% and reduce the poverty rate of 12.3% in 2019.

On 23 June, President Putin, in a televised address, announced additional economic and social support measures as a result of the pandemic's impact. He announced the end of Russia's flat income tax rate of 13% that he introduced in 2001 by increasing the tax rate for the top earners who earn over 5 million rubles to 15%, starting from 1 January 2021. He said that the extra revenue of around 60 billion rubles would go towards helping children with severe or rare diseases. He also announced other measures including increased benefits to families where both parents have lost their job and a one-off payment to families in July of 10,000 rubles for each child they have aged under 16. 100 billion rubles would also handed out in loans for businesses to pay employees. He also said that IT companies would benefit from an ultra-low tax regime and profits tax for them would be cut from 20% to 3%.

On 17 July, Reuters reported that the economy shrank by 9.6% year-on-year in the 2nd quarter, the most in 20 years, according to the economy minister. Real disposable incomes fell by 8% in year-on-year terms in April to June according to Rosstat. It also said that Russia's industrial output fell by 9.4% in June compared to a year ago.

On 22 July, the economy minister, Maxim Reshetnikov, was quoted as saying that Russia's GDP declined by 4.2% in the first half of 2020. He said that this ministry was maintaining its 2020 forecast of a decrease of 4.8%, but that it would be revised in August.

=== August–October 2020 ===
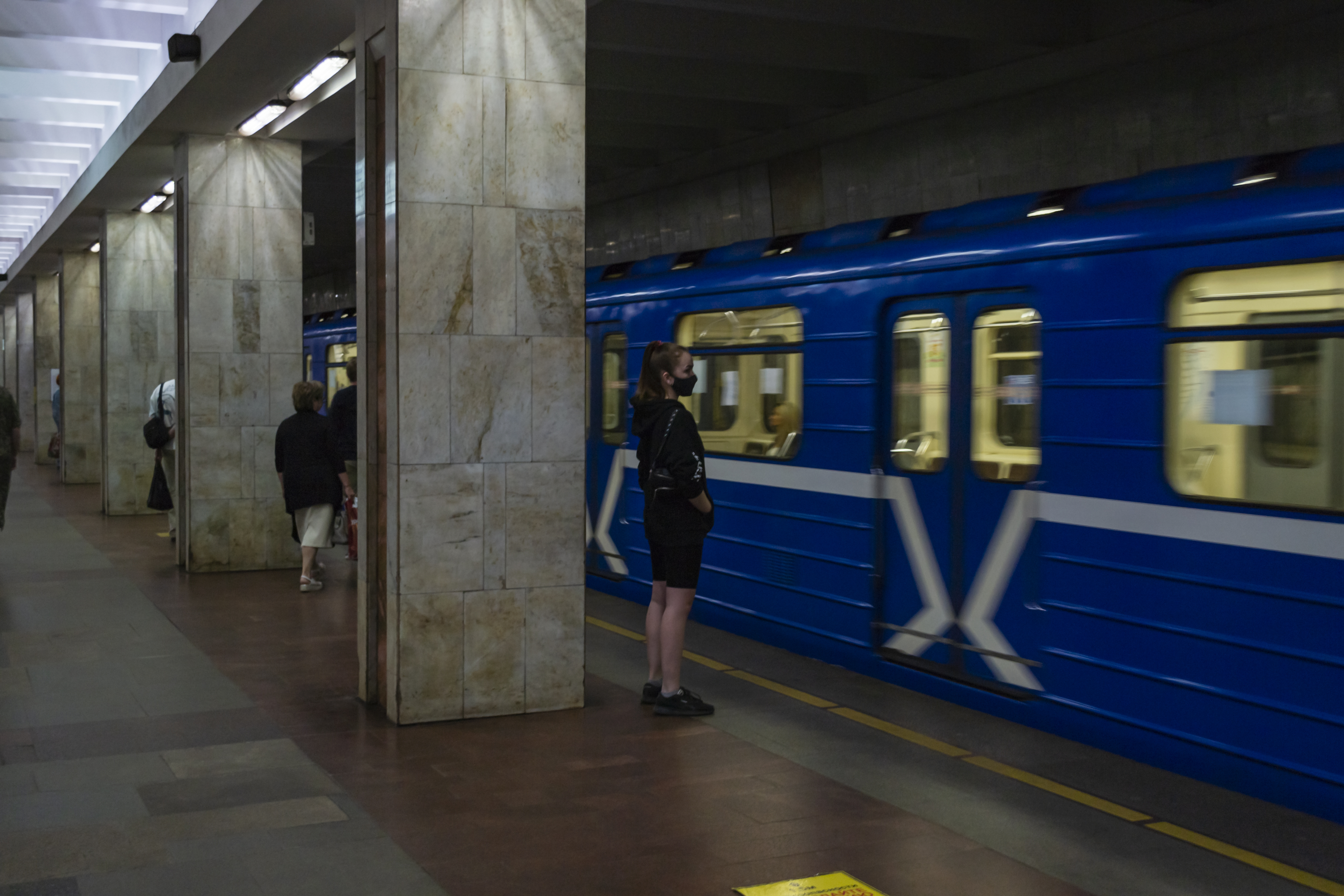
Mask mode in the Nizhny Novgorod metro. Proletarskaya metro station.

On 4 August, the head of the Federal Tourism Agency, Zarina Doguzova, said that total losses for the tourism industry amounted to about 1.5 trillion rubles, with losses from the closure of the borders amounting to around 500 billion rubles.

On 20 August, the economy minister said that GDP fell 4.7% in July, compared to having fallen 6.4% in the previous month.

On 11 August, Reuters reported that the economy contracted by 8.5% in the second quarter, after growing by 1.2% in Q1, however this was less than expected. Rosstat said that only the agriculture sector grew in Q2, while commodity, retail, transport and services sectors were hardest hit. According to the central bank, the economy is likely to shrink by 4.5-5.5% for the whole of 2020 before starting to grow again in 2021.
