= Impact of the COVID-19 pandemic on migration =

The COVID-19 pandemic has impacted migrants throughout the globe. Low-skilled migrants, refugees, and internally-displaced migrants are at a higher risk of contracting the virus. The pandemic has also aggravated the dangers of already-dangerous migration routes. Since the outbreak of COVID-19, international organizations have recorded a spike in human rights abuses suffered by migrants, especially in Africa, Latin America, and Asia. The restrictions on travel, imposed as a measure to contain the virus, have resulted in a rise in "stranded migrants," individuals who want to return to their home countries but cannot.

== Impacts on migrant health ==
=== Low-wage labor migrants ===
Low-skilled labor migrants have contracted the pandemic in disproportionately high rates than citizens. According to the International Organization for Migration, a United Nations-affiliated agency, poverty is a major cause in the spread of COVID-19 among migrant populations in relation to citizens. Low-income migrant workers tend to live in crowded housing, perform strenuous work, and eat poorly, all of which put them at higher risk of contracting COVID-19. The share of immigrant workers living in poverty is high in several OECD countries (32 percent in Spain, 25 percent in the United States, and 30 percent in Italy in 2017). Pandemic-triggered unemployment has affected citizens and migrants alike, but since migrants do not benefit from government relief packages, they become more impoverished and therefore more likely to contract the virus. Furthermore, low-wage migrants have limited familiarity with available health resources, whether because of language barriers or because they have limited exposure to official medical directives. Low-income migrants also lack access to the same levels of health insurance as citizens. Moreover, migrants are overrepresented in sectors defined as essential, both because they tend to work in infrastructure sectors (in 2020, 69% of all migrants in the United States worked in essential infrastructure jobs), and because they tend to work in jobs where remote work is impossible. In Saudi Arabia and Singapore, migrants made up 75 percent and 94 percent, respectively of all new confirmed cases in May–June 2020.

=== Refugees and internally-displaced migrants ===
Refugees are among the most vulnerable to COVID-19, especially those residing in camps and temporary shelters. They are at heightened risk of contracting diseases because of their poverty, overcrowded living conditions limited access to medical services, and exclusion from benefits given to citizens. Refugees and asylum seekers make up about 10 percent of all international migrants, and according to the International Organization for Migration, the 20 countries with the highest number of COVID-19 infections are home to 9.2 million refugees, almost half of all refugees worldwide. Internally-displaced migrants - individuals displaced within their own country - are similarly vulnerable. At the end of 2019, there were 50.8 million people internally displaced, 45.7 million of them due to conflict and 5.1 million in the context of disasters. These internally-displaced persons are particularly vulnerable to pandemics, especially those among them over the age of 60, who number 3.7 million.

Migration to Europe in 2021

Even after the outbreak of COVID-19, migrants continue to cross the Central Mediterranean, described by the International Organization for Migration as the most dangerous maritime migration route worldwide. An estimated 4,056 people attempted this crossing in August 2020 (up from 3,477 in the same month in 2019), although Italy's port closures and suspension of search and rescue operations, in response to COVID-19, have made the crossing deadlier than before. Some 283 individuals are known to have died on this route between March and August 2020, and the lack of rescue boats suggests that more shipwrecks have gone unnoticed.

== Impact on human rights of migrants ==
The Mixed Migration Centre (MMC), a non-profit focusing on migrants' human rights, found that migrants report a rise in abuse and human rights violations since the start of the pandemic. Between July and August 2020, the MMC surveyed 3,569 respondents in Africa, Latin America, and Asia, and found that since the COVID-19 pandemic began, migrants have faced increased risks of arbitrary arrest and detention, deportation, theft, bribery and extortion, domestic violence, sexual exploitation, and labor exploitation. Notably high shares of respondents in East Africa (65%) and Latin America (55%) perceived a rise in arbitrary arrests and detention. Although the proportion of respondents reporting such a rise was lower in Asia as a whole (33%), the majority of respondents in Malaysia (82%) perceived an increased risk of being rounded up and imprisoned. Migrants are also often at the very forefront of vaccine trials, volunteering. They also undertake critical jobs at the same time, such as health care roles that can be understaffed. Migrants are fundamental to the pandemic response, yet they are more targeted and discriminated against. Therefore, it is the International Organization for Migration's opinion as of 2020 that combatting xenophobia is key for bettering the life of migrants. Migrants stimulate the economy, and are necessary to its recovery post COVID-19. As of 2020 worldwide it is estimated that 2.7 million migrants were stranded. It is also estimated that as of 2020 the pandemic stalled migration by 27 percent. Migrants in many cases have become stranded, unable to work, unable to access healthcare, or unable to update their legal status. 19 to 30 million people worldwide have also been pushed to extreme poverty as of 2020, threatening to double food scarcity.

== Migrants at sea ==
Migrants at sea have faced more health risks due to COVID-19 measures. Large numbers of sea workers, including fishermen and cruise ship employees were stranded at sea for months due to port closures and travel bans. Mental health concerns became forefront with multiple suicides reported among sea workers. The United Nations even called on countries to consider sea workers essential workers, in order to allow them to rotate out of their sea voyages. For migrants stranded at sea, access to healthcare, the proper hygiene products, and shelter have been important concerns. These conditions are of course combined with already dangerous situations.

== Migrants living in camps ==
Migrants living in camps have faced a much higher risk of transmitting and getting COVID-19. Life in these camps has featured overcrowding, inadequate sanitation, poor nutrition, and very poor health care. Rises in COVID-19 cases were reported in migrant and refugee camps in 2020 in Bangladesh, Ethiopia, and on Greek islands. They were also reported in Germany, Malaysia, and camps in Gulf Cooperation Council states, as well as in Singapore. Deaths from COVID-19 at camps were reported in 2020 in the United States and in Bangladesh. People living in these camps essentially live in overcrowded slums, where distancing is impossible, with limited access to even water or other basic provisions.

== Migrants living in shelters ==
Central American migrants crossing Mexico, aiming for the United States, face mental health risks associated with violence and the uncertainty of their legal status, which hinders their ability to integrate into the host society.

During the COVID-19 pandemic, the U.S. government cited public health concerns to justify denying entry and expediting the return of migrants to Mexico, even when they were not Mexican nationals. This policy, criticized by public health experts, forced migrants to wait in Mexico, where job opportunities and support resources were limited due to the pandemic. These circumstances jeopardized their livelihoods and increased their risk of contracting COVID-19.

The pandemic and lockdown measures affected migrants' mental health, causing anguish and fear about health risks and economic consequences. Increased uncertainty about asylum applications, feelings of entrapment, and the challenges of living in crowded shelters, exacerbated feelings of anxiety and hopelessness. Shelter confinement was particularly hard for those who had previously experienced detention or kidnapping, worsening existing mental health issues like depression, anxiety, and post-traumatic stress disorder. Substance use also increased, particularly among those outside shelters, while lockdown restrictions made it difficult for shelter residents to manage their substance use.

Mental health care for migrants, mainly provided by volunteers, CSOs, and international agencies, was disrupted during the pandemic. Shelters received fewer donations, and physical distancing limited visits from mental health professionals, reducing individual and group therapy sessions. The absence of daily casual contact with shelter staff, which had been a source of emotional support, further impacted migrants' mental health. Although remote mental health services were available, they were underused due to migrants' reluctance to recognize mental health problems and the lack of private spaces for consultations in shelters.

== Restrictions on travel and migration ==
Governments around the globe have issued migration restrictions, including absolute bans on incoming travel. The International Organization for Migration recorded that as of June 2020, a total of 216 countries established over 45,300 travel restrictions to contain the spread of COVID-19. Of 763 surveyed airports around the globe, 69 percent were partially or fully closed. Over 80 percent of land border crossings were partially or fully closed. The imposition of closures and bans have left a substantial number of migrants stranded, meaning desiring but unable to return home. These stranded migrants include seasonal workers, international students, temporary visa holders, and migrants who travelled for medical treatment. In India complete lockdown, led to the exodus of around 43.3 million interstate migrants on foot from cities and provinces These migrants are often ineligible for government assistance due to their migratory status, resulting in hundreds of families falling into extreme poverty. People at sea ("seafarers") face additional mobility issues due to COVID-19 travel restrictions. Large numbers of maritime personnel, including fishermen and employees on cruise ships and cargo vessels, have been stranded at sea for months.

== See also ==
- Xenophobia and racism related to the COVID-19 pandemic
