= Impact of the COVID-19 pandemic on human rights in Argentina =

The 2020 COVID-19 pandemic in Argentina affected the human rights situation in the country.

On 19 March, a nationwide lockdown was established in Argentina until 31 March. The government later extended the lockdown through April, and May. On 9 May, the nationwide lockdown was lifted, excepting the Greater Buenos Aires urban area (where 31.9% of the country's population lives), with this area being locked down until 24 May, later extended to 7 June, and then 28 June, after a big jump in the number of new cases in this area. On 26 June, Fernández announced that the previously-eased restrictions on movement in this area would be tightened again until 17 July due to a large spike in cases on the previous days. Finally, on 17 July, the lockdown was due to be gradually loosened in several stages to lead to the return to normality, although restrictions were extended several times until at least 20 September.

Claims were made on police brutality, domestic violence, human trafficking, and the right to freedom of movement.

== Police brutality ==
During the COVID-19 pandemic, several police brutality cases took place in Argentina. The country has several levels of security forces: Federal (such as National Gendarmerie), Provincial (Buenos Aires Provincial Police, for example) and local (Local Police of Ezeiza, for example)

According to NGO CORREPI, 92 people died in hands of police forces during the pandemic. Of those, 34 deaths were a result of trigger-happy policemen (gatillo fácil), 45 were deaths during police custody, 3 were forced disappearances, and one death was result of a clash between police forces. This report also states that in 50 of those cases, provincial security forces were involved, other 27 cases had provincial prison guards involved, in 7 federal security forces were involved, and in other 7, the Buenos Aires City Police. Sabrina Frederic, national Minister of Security, denied an increase on police brutality, claiming that her office had received 39 complaints during this period. Horacio Pietragalla, national Secretariat for Human Resources, stated that his office received 531 complaints on police response during the pandemic.

Sabrina Corio, resident of Bariloche, was arrested on 7 August by the Río Negro Provincial Police for taking her dog out for a walk in a day in which, according to the sanitary lockdown measures, she was forbidden to do so. She was kept in custody, in solitary confinement, for seven hours. She claimed she was beaten while getting up a police patrol, that no basic hygiene measures were provided, and that police was unable to tell her where she was being taken. Also, water was refused to her. Sabrina declared having been kidnapped by the police. After being liberated, following social media pressure, she reported threatens were made in her house. The police, which used five agents and a SUV to take the woman into custody, claimed she resisted arrest. Gustavo Gennusso, then-mayor of Bariloche, demanded an explanation to the province's Ministry of Security, claiming no person should be mistreated. A legal process was started on Sabrina on violations of the 205 article of the Argentine Penal Code: violating measures taken to prevent the spread of an epidemic.

Other cases attracted special nationwide public attention in the country:

=== Luis Espinoza case ===
On 15 May, Luis Espinoza was murdered and then disappeared by the Provincial Police of Tucumán, in the north of Argentina, following an operation of lockdown control during an illegal horse race in the town of Melcho, where Luis was passing by. After struggling with the police, the man was shot by the back. His body was then moved to the local police precinct, wrapped in plastic and bed sheets, and taken afterwards to the neighbor province of Catamarca, where it was dropped into a ravine.

The UN, through the OHCHR, started an investigation on the case.

=== Florencia Magalí Morales case ===
Florencia Magalí Morales was found hanged in a police cell on 5 April in Santa Rosa de Conlara, San Luis Province. That same day, she had left in her bicycle to buy groceries, when provincial police stopped her for allegedly driving in the wrong way of the street and violating the lockdown, as her DNI ending number didn't allow her to leave home on that day. Police claimed the death a suicide, something denied by her family. Two witnesses, other prisoners in that same precinct, stated that Florencia screamed for help for hours, but they were transferred after hearing that, leaving the woman alone in the place.

An autopsy claimed the death could have been caused either by the shoelace found in the scene or by a precision knock in the cervical vertebrae area. No witness saw the body hanging. In August, a new autopsy was performed, requested by Florencia's family. Protests followed the death in the city, and the National Ministry of Security made claims to the San Luis Province government. The UN included the death in a femicide list.

=== Valentino Blas Correa case ===
Valentino Blas Correa, a 17-year-old boy from the Córdoba Province, was killed by the police on 6 August after skipping a police checkpoint in Córdoba, fearing his car would be taken for violating the lockdown.

=== Facundo Astudillo case ===
Facundo Astudillo Castro disappeared on 30 April, after being stopped and fined for lockdown violation by the Buenos Aires Provincial Police. His last known picture shows him in front of police patrol SUV number RO 23360. There is an ongoing investigation on the matter, with no arrested suspects.

It was cataloged by the victim family as a Forced disappearance in hands of the Buenos Aires Provincial Police. This theory was also followed by human rights activist Estela de Carlotto.

The cased fueled claims by the UN Committee on Enforced Disappearances (OHCHR) as well as the Inter-American Commission on Human Rights. Several public statements were made by Argentine President, Alberto Fernández, and Buenos Aires Governor, Axel Kicillof.

His body remains were found on 15 August 2020, in an advanced state of decomposition, in an area between the cities of General Daniel Cerri and Villarino Viejo.

== Domestic violence ==
During the 120 first days of lockdown, the Domestic Violence Bureau (dependent on the Supreme Court) received 1280 reports of intrafamily violence. The number of women killed reached a 10-year high during the COVID-19 lockdown.

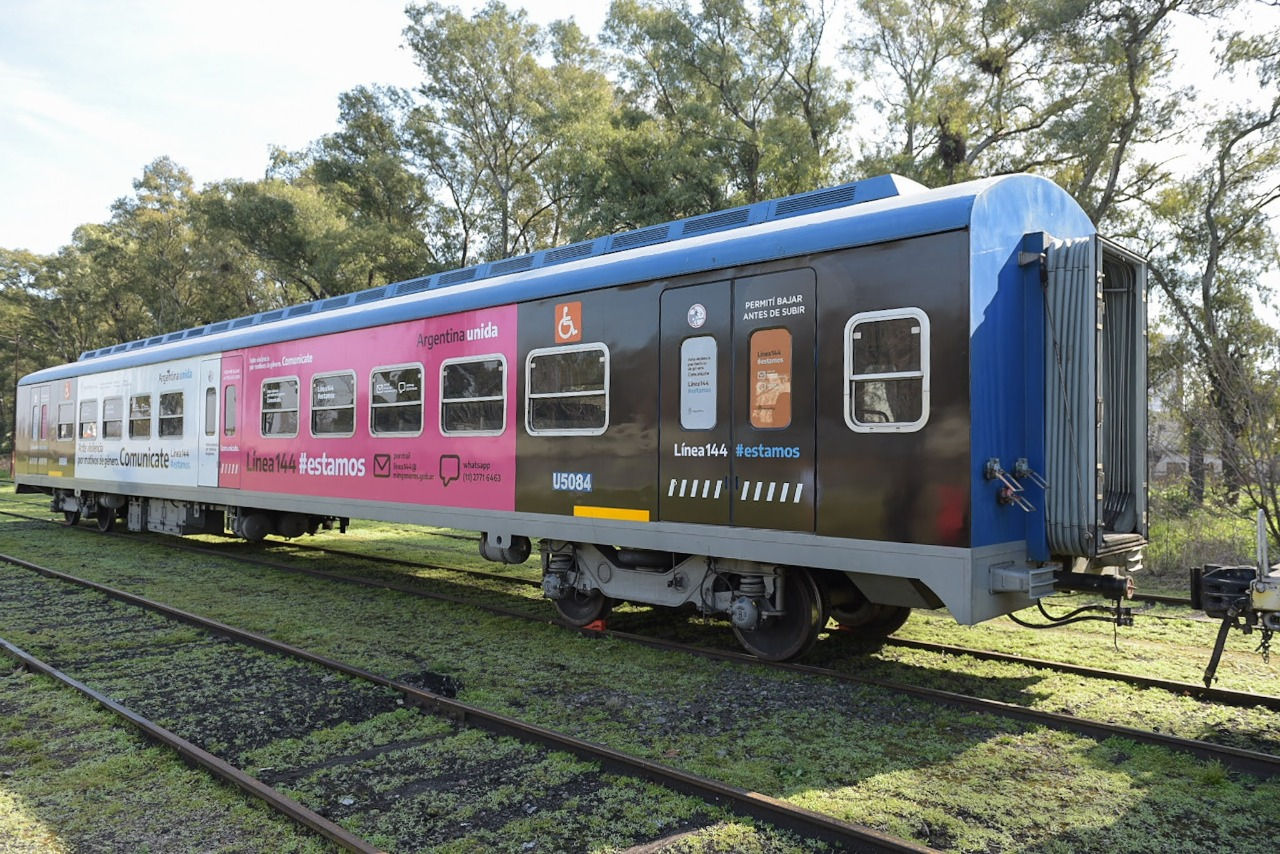
San Martín Line car advertising the 144 emergency telephone number against gender violence

As the lockdown meant for many women to be forced to spend the day with their aggressors, an email and three WhatsApp contact numbers were created. There were also Facebook, Twitter and Telegram accounts active for reporting violence cases, as well as the 144 emergency telephone number. Reporting the cases by text messages brings the victim the benefit of being able to delete the message after sending it, avoiding it to be seen by the aggressor. Also, the National General Defensory launched the #NoEstásSola campaign (#YouAreNotAlone) to prevent and fight domestic violence, informing that the lockdown allowed victims to reach a police precinct.

Domestic violence was called "the other pandemic" in Argentina by the UN. Following this statements, the Spotlight Initiative, and EU/UN partnership to fight domestic violence, launched in the country two advertising campaigns designed for a lockdown context.

Several hotels gave free rooms to be used as refugees by women suffering domestic violence and not having to spend the lockdown with their aggressors.

On 19 March 2020, the National Appeals Civil Court determined a 60-day extension on all injunctions regarding personal protection, among them: panic buttons and restraining orders. On 13 May, the measures were extended once again for 60 days.

According to Estela Díaz, Minister of Women, Gender Policies and Diversity for the Buenos Aires Province, domestic violence claims decreased as the lockdown made them more dangerous, since the victim had to came back to live all day with the aggressor after filing a complaint.

On a national level, the 144 emergency phone number for gender violence received 34,494 calls during the lockdown (between 20 March and 30 June), a 28% higher number than on the same period of the previous year. In the capital city, Buenos Aires, a 48% year-on-year increase in gender violence calls was registered on the 144 line.

In the Buenos Aires Province, a 35% year-on-year increase in gender violence calls was registered, with 5,903 calls to the 144 line between March and July. The Minister of Women, Gender Policies and Diversity for the Buenos Aires Province pointed that femicides were the only crime not going down during the lockdown, and that in 80% of those cases the assailant is the victim's couple or ex-couple.

In Salta Province, the Observatory on Violence against Women pointed out that during the lockdown (as of July 2020) a 10% year-on-year increase in gender violence had been registered.

== Freedom of movement ==
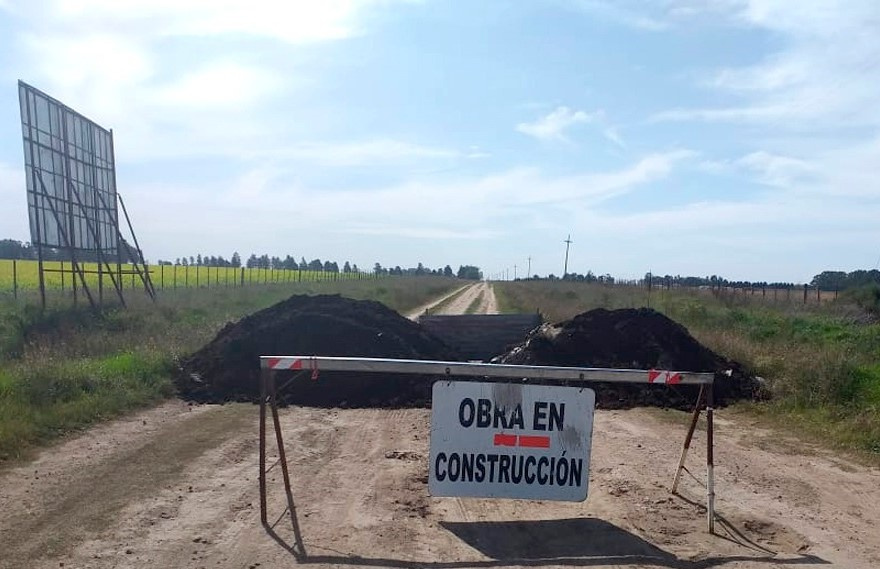
Barricade in Coronel Suarez, Buenos Aires

As part of the pandemic response, the government of Argentina established heavy restrictions on travelling and movement. This included checkpoints in the province's borders and the entrances to several cities (some including dirt barricades). President Fernández stated: "The freedom of the people is not in dispute, but the first condition of being free is to be alive". Lockdown offenders were prosecuted under the 205 article of the Argentine Penal Code: violating measures taken to prevent the spread of an epidemic, which could lead to 2 years prison sentences.

This was one of several claims which fueled the 17A protests. Truck drivers also criticized the roadblocks and lockdown control measures in roads, stating they had to wait for up to 20 hours in police checkpoints. Truck doors were also sealed while transiting some provinces, in which cases the drivers were unable to even make a bathroom stop for hours. This was considered inhumane by truck drivers. On September, a trucker had a heart attack while en route, and was refused medical care in two provinces, having to wait over 16 hours to be admitted in a hospital. Another truck driver was jailed for 14 days for getting down to check on his cargo.

On August, a woman died of cancer without being able to be visited by his father, who had received the required permits to travel. He was denied entrance to the Córdoba province for not complying with showing a negative PCR test for COVID-19, despite having two quick tests performed, which were qualified as "dubious" by provincial police. He was escorted by police back to his home province Neuquén. An 71 years-old man died in September after the ambulance he was being transported in was refused entrance to La Pampa province.

Olympic rower Ariel Suárez trained in the Luján River in Tigre, challenging the lockdown measures. He was fined by the Naval Prefecture, and Ministry of Health Gines Gonzales García stated that although rowing was not permitted, it could be if a request was made, as he saw no risk in the sport.

Commercial flights were restricted from April to, at least, September, following one of the longest lockdowns worldwide. By September 2020, Argentina was the biggest aviation market in its region still not allowing commercial flights. IATA repeatedly criticized government policies on aviation, and its regional VP for Americas, Peter Cerdá, stated: "We worry about Argentina becoming the next Venezuela, moving from being a key aviation market in the region to having a very limited connectivity". Following this travel ban, one of the most strict in the world, airline LATAM Argentina closed on 17 June.

== Government response ==
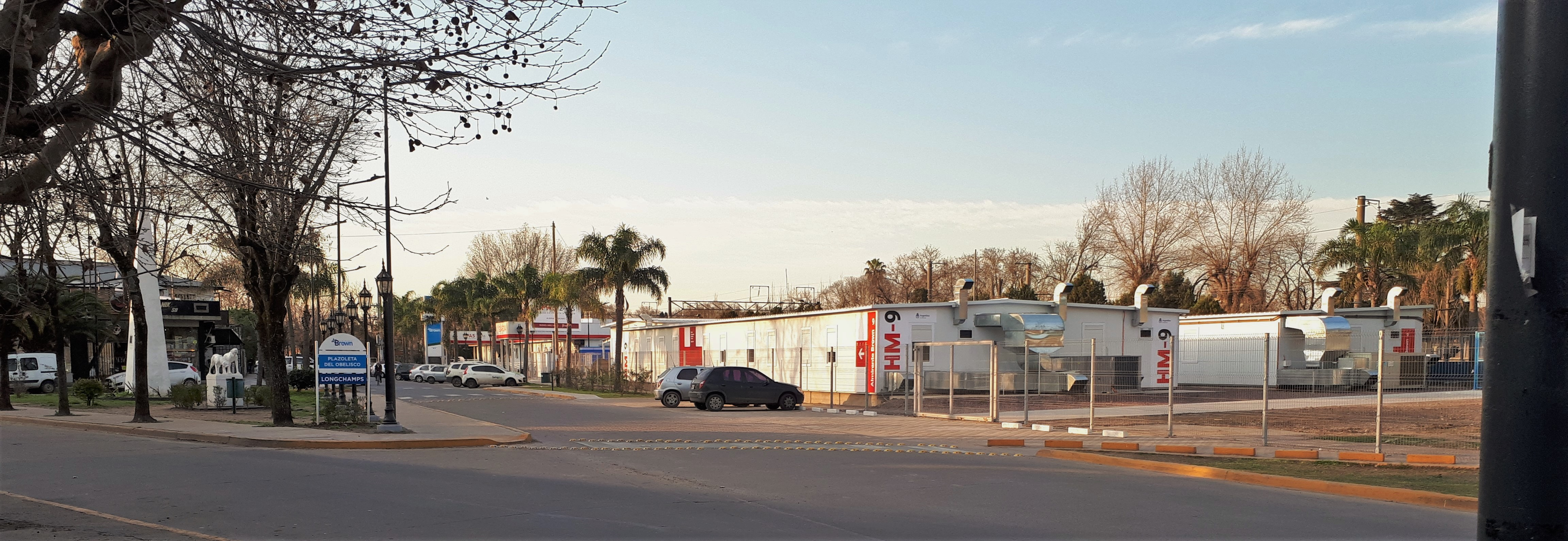
Modular Hospital in the Southern Greater Buenos Aires Area

=== Right to health and life ===
The Fernandez administration took several measures to soften the effect of the pandemic, increasing hospital beds, purchasing ventilators and medicines.

The country's health system had been in bad shape for years after several budget cuts. In March 2020, the government declared a Healthcare Emergency in the country.

Eleven 1,000 m^{2} (11,000 sq ft) modular hospitals were built in the Greater Areas of Buenos Aires, Córdoba, Resistencia and Rosario.

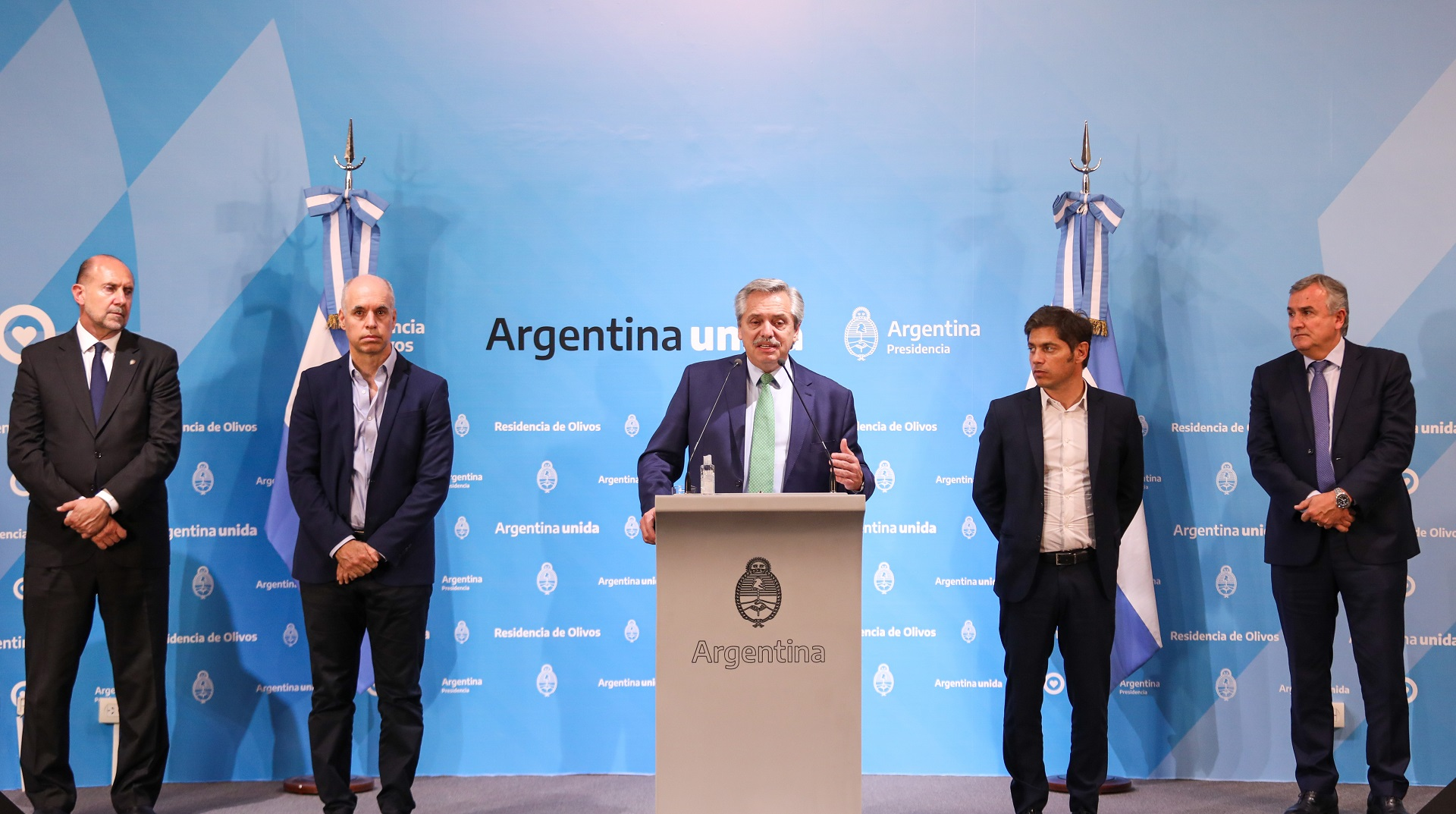
Alberto Fernández, as he declared a nationwide lockdown on 20 March 2020

=== Refusal to declare the State of Emergency ===
When ruling the lockdown, President Alberto Fernandez had to choose for whether declaring or not the State of Emergency (Estado de Sitio), a constitutional emergency state designed for "internal commotion or external attack" cases. He refused to declare so, backed by province Governors Alicia Kirchner, Gustavo Melella and Mariano Arcioni, while other Governors as Gerardo Morales, Gerardo Zamora, Omar Perotti, Juan Luis Manzur, Ricardo Quintela and Sergio Uñac, favored declaring it.

Both parties finally agreed on not declaring the emergency state, but the discussion on whether it was the right call or not went on for weeks.
