= Impact of the COVID-19 pandemic on hospitals =

Consequences of COVID-19 pandemic for hospitals

The COVID-19 pandemic has impacted hospitals around the world. During the height of the pandemic, many hospitals scaled back or postponed non-emergency care. This had medical consequences for the people served by the hospitals, and financial consequences for the hospitals. Health and social systems across the globe struggled to cope. The situation was especially challenging in humanitarian, fragile and low-income country contexts, where health and social systems are already weak. Health facilities in many places closed or limited services. The pandemic also resulted in the imposition of COVID-19 vaccine mandates in places such as California and New York for all public workers, including hospital staff.

== General implications ==
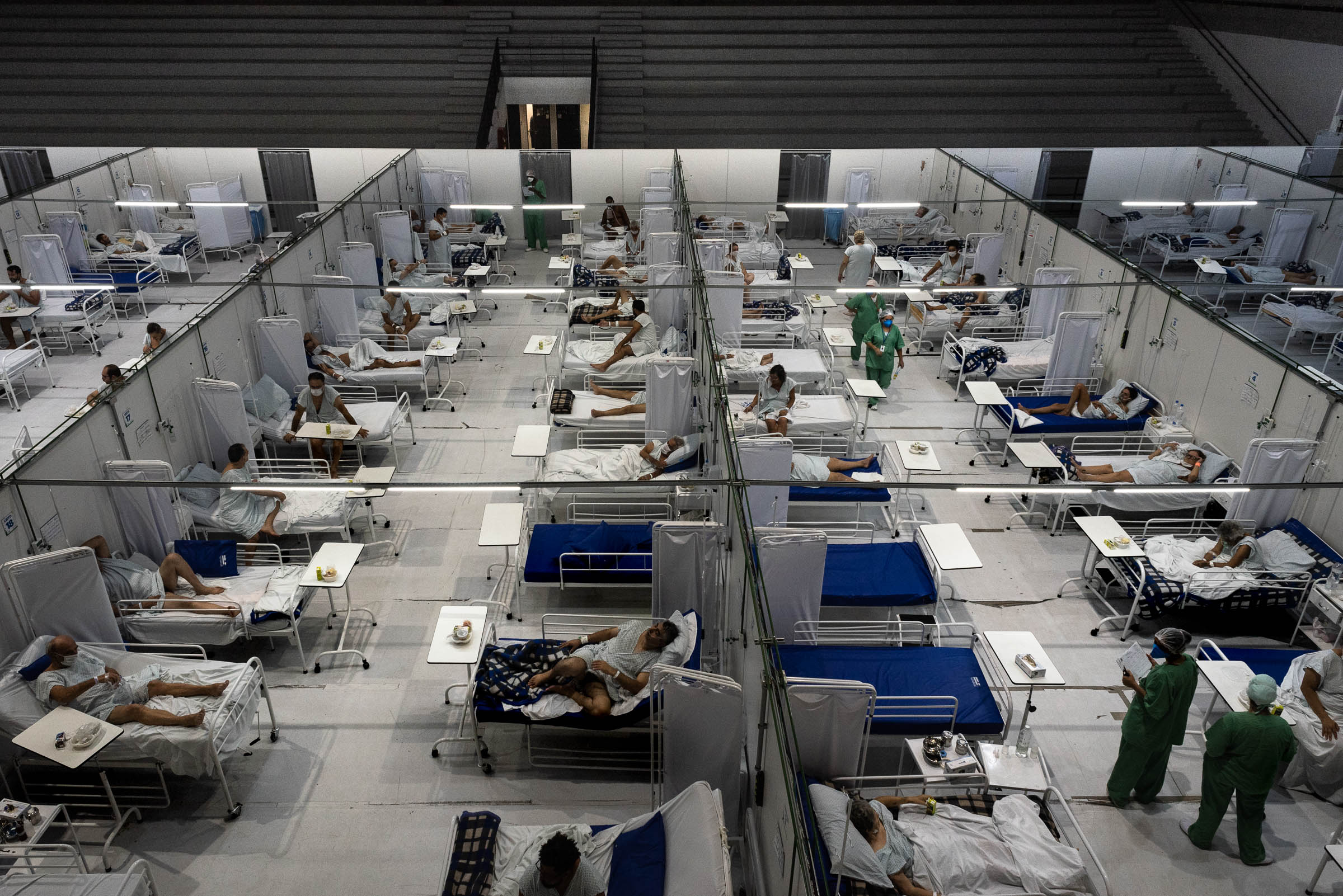
A field hospital at peak of the COVID-19 pandemic in Brazil

COVID-19 caused nurses and other healthcare workers to work more days and have even longer shifts. The media reported the longer working hours led to increased exhaustion among nurses. Many aspects of the pandemic also caused a shortage of workers, resulting in increased patient load for working nurses.

After the vaccines were introduced, many speculated if healthcare professionals were allowed to deny and turn away unvaccinated patients. However, this is considered incorrect and highly unprofessional, ensuring it does not happen when entering a hospital. Others speculated whether patient treatment order could be determined by vaccination status, such that the vaccinated receive treatment before the unvaccinated. This was also deemed unprofessional and unethical, so treatment order remained determined by severity and priority as usual.

Researchers demonstrated that, due to cancelled or postponed surgical procedures, 28.4 million procedures were postponed during the peak 12 weeks of the pandemic. 2.3 million cancer surgeries were expected to be postponed. Estimates could show that 72.3% of all surgical procedures would be cancelled and that benign disease and orthopaedics would be the most affected procedures. On the other hand, a study published by the same group could show that postoperative pulmonary complications and mortality were significantly elevated in operated patients with SARS-CoV-2-infection, although the increased risk diminishes 7 weeks after SARS-CoV-2 diagnosis. To minimize the risk for SARS-CoV-2-related complications after hospital procedures, later in the pandemic COVID-19-free clinical pathways and prioritisation of elective surgery patients for vaccination were proposed as strategies to safely restart surgery.

In a global student survey (Aristovnik et al., 2020), the respondents were by far the most satisfied with the role of hospitals with two-thirds of all respondents being satisfied (or very satisfied) with their response, especially in Sri Lanka with even 94.6% in the times of the first wave of the COVID-19 pandemic. It is obvious that since globally healthcare providers were working harder than ever to keep citizens safe this may act as a starting point for providers to rebuild the nation's (including students') satisfaction and trust in healthcare. COVID-19 caused nurses and other healthcare workers to have even longer shifts and work more days. In the media, they state that nurses have gained more exhaustion due to working long work hours. Nowadays, there is a higher shortage of workers, which then causes a nurse to have more patients.

== Visitation right ==
One of the biggest alterations hospitals made across the country during the pandemic involved visitation rights of the patient. Studies have shown that family support can lead to a faster recovery time and shorter stay. Patients normally feel less anxious in a hospital setting while their family members are present. India Owens realized there is a "reduction in medical errors" when the family is present and able to assist the patient's needs.

In a normal setting, the nurse's job is to assist the patient's needs with medical diagnoses or supporting the family with difficult medical news. Nurses normally play the role of support, but they also have to keep their distance by not getting to close to the patient. Unfortunately, COVID-19 caused patient bedside and family visitation to completely change. Nurses continued to be "a proxy for family and a clinical practitioner" for the patient. Overtime, the weight of taking care of patients' emotions and life can affect a nurses emotional health too, which ultimately effects what the hospital can provide to its patients.

== Responses To Restrictions on Visitation Rights ==
Since the restrictions due to COVID-19 are limiting the family members allowed to come into the hospitals, health care workers have found ways to still support the patients using the source of technology. Web-based video conferencing using FaceTime and Skype, along with camera systems have shown benefits in the hospital settings. Another interaction that is missed due to the new restrictions caused by the pandemic are peer to peer support groups. Support groups are used to allow people to understand that they are not the only ones going through something and be able to talk to someone with the same conditions. To find ways around these restrictions there has been the addition of online support groups that can meet at any time and individuals can also post anonymously if they so choose.

== Locations ==
=== Asia ===
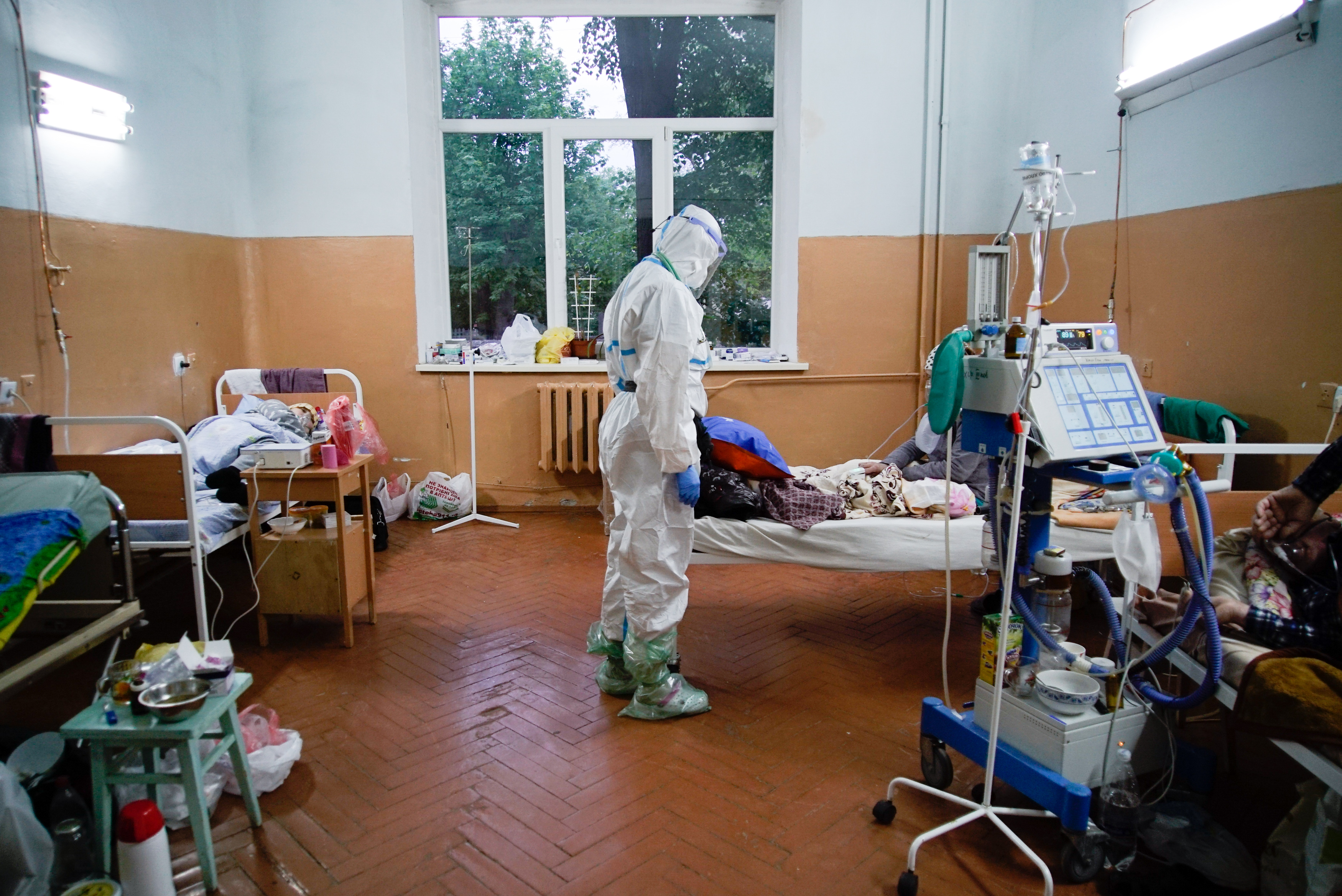
COVID-19 patient in a hospital in Chernivtsi, Ukraine

China has rapidly constructed new hospitals to accommodate a large number of beds. However, to touch on more positive effects that COVID-19 had on patient care, a study within the Journal of Health Care Organizations was done in China. This study focused on discovering the effects that the pandemic had on doctor-patient relationships, and its findings were very inclusive. Interviewing both citizens and doctors, it found that citizens felt that service attitude and communication with medical staff had been improved. It was also found that the trust in doctors had gone up by 86.8%, and the majority of citizens, 66.0%, preferred hospitals for their care needs. Patients were even more likely to recommend health care to family and friends due to the experiences they went through at the hospitals. These statistics show that through the pandemic, patients were extremely pleased with the care they were receiving, a much better alternative than being refused treatment, as previously thought possible.

According to doctors in Tokyo, Japan, the state of emergency is not enough for stopping the spread of the coronavirus.

Indonesia faced the alarming situation with relatively small number of healthcare workers, with only 4 doctors and 21 nurses per 10,000 citizens. Some hospitals were not properly testing patients for the infection. Also, the required personal protective equipment (PPE) of sufficient quality was not available. With hospital beds running out in Delhi and other cities of India, people were being forced to find ways to treat sick patients at home. And the higher demand of concentrators, essential drugs and oxygen bottles have boosted the prices making it inaccessible to people and flawed drugs with cheap prices were circulating in the market. Laboratories were overcrowded and taking several days to get the test result.

Delta variant of coronavirus was reaching to its disturbing levels in Pakistan's biggest city Karachi, on Eid al Adha Muslim holiday, even some privately owned hospitals were rejecting the admission of new patients. In Russia, where 83% of the hospital beds were designated for the patients with COVID-19, were also occupied.

Numerous hospitals in Japan had experienced a deficiency of specialist. This persistent problem was further exposed by the pandemic in 2020. Doctors and nurses who were complaining about extra duty hours had reached to their limits as COVID-19 patients occupied all the available beds. In addition to the shortage of general doctors in Japan, the spread of COVID-19 has revealed a shortage of infectious disease specialists. Contrary, it has more hospital beds per capita than any other country in the world: twice as many as France and nearly five times more than in the United States. A COVID-19 infection in a hospital means a 14-day quarantine for medical staff, during which they cannot accept new in-house patients or emergency visits. And after it suffered a hospital infection in April, it had to be closed to new patients. Eight Thai hospitals were temporarily closed after patients covered up the fact of infection with COVID-19 and transmission of the virus to hospital staff. Many of the medical staff had to isolate themselves.

In the Philippines, the state-run San Lazaro Hospital in Manila City produced an average of 10,000 kilograms of infectious medical waste each month, which includes personal protective equipment (PPE), bandages, blood and urine bags, syringes, test tubes, sputum cups and histopathological waste used according to the Ministry of Health, in accordance with the guidelines of the World Health Organization (WHO). Almost 40% of nurses in private hospitals have resigned since the pandemic began, according to the Private Hospital Association of the Philippines. In the past few weeks, healthcare workers have been protesting unpaid benefits, including a special coronavirus risk allowance.

Nurses are facing job dissatisfaction which increases their likelihood to quit and find a new career. Malaysia showed dramatic burnout rates where the "turnover rate increased by more than 50% between 2005 and 2010".

=== North America ===
In the United States, hospitals financially rely on "surgeries, scans and other well-reimbursed services to privately insured patients". Non-emergency care was discontinued during the pandemic, causing severe financial problems. For example, the Mayo Clinic's revenue had a net gain of $1 billion in 2019, but had to cancel surgeries in 2020 and therefore expects to lose nearly $1 billion during 2020.

The federal government passed the CARES Act, which is giving $30 billion to hospitals nationwide. 261 hospital systems laid off or furloughed over 100,000 employees by May 21.

Hospitals and other healthcare organizations in North America were unprepared for the COVID-19 pandemic. Many hospitals face a lack of reliable testing kits, ventilators, and PPE. Each of these pieces of equipment is crucial for preventing, diagnosing, and treating COVID-19.

North American hospitals and other medical institutions were not ready for the COVID-19 pandemic. Many hospitals face a shortage of reliable test kits, ventilators, and PPEs and each of these is essential for the prevention, diagnosis, and treatment of COVID-19. Between 2019 and 2020, the U.S. healthcare system was unable to define key elements of sharing information between interhospital, interstate, and federal partners, assessing the impact of the event in real-time to load-balancing the staff, patients and resources. In some cases, there were issues with both, the availability and distribution of resources. As COVID-19 has placed extraordinary demands on the hospital's oxygen system to provide care in an intensive care environment and used non-traditional staff and contracted to meet Demand. Most California acute care hospitals began started to put off admissions and non-urgent treatments when the COVID-19 pandemic hit.

One of the main drivers of the COVID-19 pandemic was Intensive Care Unit (ICU) capacity as resources such as hospital staff and personal protective equipment (PPE) were continuously used up. Although disaster planning for such a contingency had already taken place (and indeed had been updated), the sheer scale of the impact first became apparent in the United States on the state level in late November 2020.

Among the concerns was the tremendous strain on staff and the inability to transfer patients to other hospitals which were likewise swamped, a particular problem in rural states which had commensurate health care infrastructure. Governor Newsom of California issued a strict stay-at-home order to take effect 48 hours whenever any of that California's five regions reached 15% remaining capacity as projections were that hospitals would be swamped by Christmas.

Of the more than 500 people hospitalized and registered in March 2020 in the US, 18% were between 45 and 54 years old and 20% were between 20 and 44 years old. Of those admitted to intensive care, 36% were between 45 and 64 years old and 12% were between 20 and 44 years old. From October 2023 to April 2024, there were 40,761 COVID-19-related hospitalizations in the U.S., of which 38,900 (95.4%) were adults 18 years of age and older. Among hospitalized adults, the 18–49, 50–64, 65–74, and 75+ age groups accounted for 13.5%, 16.7%, 21.3%, and 48.6% of cases, respectively.

Canadian hospitals prioritized more urgent and life-saving treatments. They retrain and transfer human resources to support the most needed areas. Compared with 2019, the number of surgeries performed in the first 16 months of the pandemic has decreased by nearly 560,000. People were virtually classified according to emergency admissions. Virtual assistance has become an important tool for primary care doctors and medical specialists and could be one of the permanent changes resulting from the pandemic. Compared with 2019, the average number of visits per day during the pandemic has decreased by 9,300. Distribution of additional Health Equipment Loan Program (HELP) through the Department of Health to aid home recovery of Canadians from surgery or illness. And the demand for wheelchairs, hospital beds, walkers and IV poles to support people's recovery at home has increased.

Mexico City was at the height of its outbreak, officials say it is facing a rush of cases with an understaffed and underserved hospital system. The authorities started a crash program to scale up. More than 40,000 individuals were hired. Private hospitals agreed to accept thousands of patients for routine operations to relieve the public system along with the military and social security hospitals. Beds were also added in tent hospitals, convention centers and racetracks. Doctors in Cuba have used social media to denounce the lack of drugs, oxygen, and other materials needed to fight a terrible outbreak of COVID19.

Costa Rica has about 30 hospitals and clinics and more than a thousand basic comprehensive care groups at the community level. The country had to set up a specialized center for people living with COVID-19 in just a few weeks, equipped with all the supplies and equipment needed to care for the patients. Patients who tested positive for COVID-19 were ordered to quarantine in their homes for 14 days. Most hospitals in Jamaica exceed the bed capacity designated to manage COVID-19, also the general hospital beds were being used. The increased demand for oxygen also threatens to overpower the supply. The ministry also suspended elective surgeries and start discharging patients who could receive home care. One of the key achievements of the Dominican Republic's reaction was to interlink private, public and military networks, which helped avoid congestion in hospital beds and ICUs across much of the country. Amid the widespread, hospitals confronted serious challenges to get the supplies for their patients and essential protective equipment for their staff.

=== Africa ===
Doctors and nurses working in public hospitals went on strike over lack of PPE's, to use while treating patients.

"Some countries like Ghana, Senegal, Nigeria, and Ivory Coast have insurance for their health workers and have promised to provide them with allowances."

The COVID-19 Pandemic has put tremendous pressure on the health system worldwide, which has resulted in many health organizations around the world canceling or suspending elective procedures in their cardiac catheterization laboratories. This delay in voting has undoubtedly led to the delay of patient care. especially those with extreme aortic stenosis, which could put them at higher risk for cardiovascular complications such as heart failure or sudden death.

Hospitals in many areas in Nigeria were under pressure as they care for a growing number of infected people in need of intensive care while facing a shortage of ventilators and personal protective equipment (PPEs). In sub-Saharan Africa are some countries such as Nigeria and Ethiopia had clear inequalities in the delivery of health services, inequality and inequalities in access to basic health care and pre-COVID19 trained health workers. As a result, the lack of healthcare professionals, the lack of guidance on how to continue non-COVID-19 services, and the discouragement of healthcare workers due to a lack of medical equipment and materials have created difficult circumstances in many healthcare facilities.

Fundamental hospitals in Tanzania are crowded with patients showing symptoms of the coronavirus, the intensive care unit is overwhelmed, and funerals have become a daily event. Beds, oxygen and ventilators was in short supply, and the intensive care units were fully occupied. The limited capacity of hospitals across Tanzania may cause life-threatening emergency medical delays. 77% of health facilities in Ghana did not have proper face masks, while half did not have surgical gloves. In some facilities, healthcare workers without adequate personal protective equipment (PPE) or adequate knowledge of IPC regulations were providing care, which resulted in the transmission of COVID-19.

Kenyatta National Hospital, the largest teaching and referral hospital in Kenya, has set up a treatment and isolation unit for the management of positive COVID-19 cases. Almost 1,500 health workers in various health institutions received training in the management of COVID-19 patients. Many countries, including Kenya, adopted other globally trending strategies, such as curfew, lockdowns and increased social distance are being adopted to answer the ideal response to a pandemic. They were warned not to treat patients if their respective hospitals do not provide them with personal protective equipment (PPE). The government ensured that Kenyan health care workers had sufficient masks and PPE, but most hospitals were unable to provide in sufficient quantity. In 2020, some Kenyan nurses refused to treat patients in protest of gear shortages. Nurses in Kakamega County, western Kenya, fled when patients with coronavirus-like symptoms came to the hospital.

Patients in Zimbabwe hospitals and clinics were treated by understudy medical attendants, junior specialists, and other staff who were still in training. This had affected the quality of care and unintentionally increased the morbidity and mortality rates. The hospitals were fully occupied. And Zimbabwe experienced its worst economic crisis in decades, with triple-digit hyperinflation. Effecting the health sectors with shortage of medicines and personal protective equipment. Moreover, doctors and nurses in the country have been on strike-intermittently for more than two years because of insufficient wages and poor working conditions.

=== Europe ===
Albanian hospitals and nurses have faced new problems arising from COVID-19.

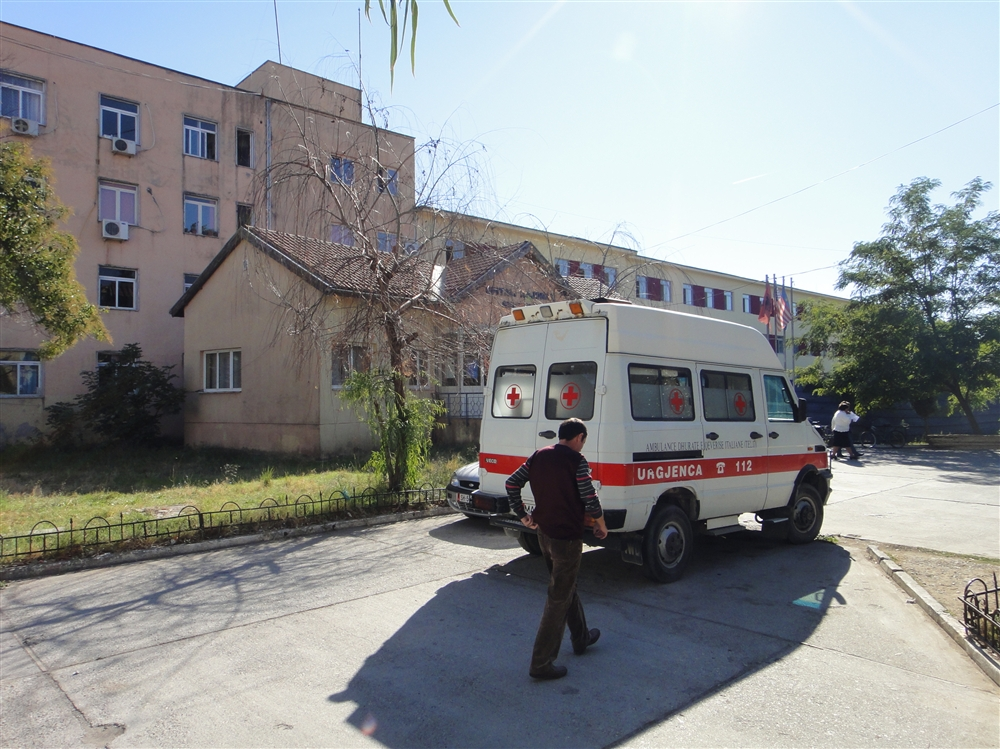
Albanian hospitals are seeking improvements with there virtual healthcare.

The lack of Personal Protective Equipment (PPE), staff shortages, fear for personal safety, and work in isolated environments led nurses' mental health to diminish.

In Albania, the PPE shortages within hospitals leave nurses feeling unsafe and fearful when working. This was supported in Kamberi's study with 63.3% of nurses agreed with the statement, "I am worried about inadequate personal protective equipment for healthcare personnel (PPE)".

Nursing staffing shortages have been a huge problem recently as "less than 50% reported 'sufficient' to 'very sufficient' staffing levels". Nurses who were assigned too many patients for a shift left them overwhelmed and unable to provide proper individual care.

The pandemic has caused a higher stress working environment and its effects on the nurse's health have emerged.

== On female staff ==
Globally, women make up 70 percent of workers in the health and social sector. Women are playing a disproportionate role in responding to the disease, including as front line healthcare workers (as well as carers at home and community leaders and mobilisers). In some countries, COVID-19 infections among female health workers are twice that of their male counterparts.

== See also ==
- Media coverage of the COVID-19 pandemic
- Misinformation related to the COVID-19 pandemic
