= Julia Marcus =

Julia Marcus may refer to:

- Julia Marcus (dancer) (1905–2002), Swiss dancer and choreographer
- Julia L. Marcus, American public health researcher and epidemiologist
