= Impact of the COVID-19 pandemic on social media =

Social media became an important platform for interaction during the COVID-19 pandemic, coinciding with the onset of social distancing. According to a study conducted by Facebook's analytics department, messaging rates rose by over 50% during this period. Individuals confined to their homes utilized social media not only to maintain social connections but also as a source of entertainment to alleviate boredom. Concerns arose regarding the overreliance on social media for primary social interactions, particularly given the constraints imposed by the pandemic.

People worldwide turned to social networking services to disseminate information, find humor through internet memes, and cope with the challenges of social distancing. The shift to virtual interactions exacerbated mental health issues to many, prompting the rapid rise of online counselling that leveraged social media platforms to connect mental health workers with those in need.

The COVID-19 pandemic highlighted the phenomenon of misinformation on social media, often referred to as an "infodemic." Platforms like Twitter and YouTube provided direct access to content, making users susceptible to rumors and unreliable information that could significantly impact individual behaviors and undermine collective efforts against the virus. Furthermore, social media became crucial for politicians, political movements, and health organizations at various levels to disseminate critical information swiftly and effectively reach the public.

== Increase in usage ==
TikTok gained significant popularity during COVID-19

=== Messaging and video call services ===
Multiple social media websites reported a sharp increase in usage after social distancing measures were put into place. Since many people could not connect with their friends and family in person, social media became the main form of communication to maintain these connections. For example, the amount of Facebook users went up to about 1.9 billion worldwide by the end of 2020, marking an 8.7% increase over 2019. Meanwhile, WhatsApp has reported a 40% percent increase in usage overall. Moreover, there was a noticeable increase in the use of Zoom since the start of the pandemic. Global downloads for TikTok went up 5% in March 2020 compared to February. A new service called Quarantine Chat, which connected users randomly, reported having over 15,000 users a month after its launch on 1 March 2020. Zoom also followed a similar procedure to connect users.

Facebook, Twitter, and YouTube have all increased reliance on spam filters because staff members who moderate content were unable to work.

=== Online counseling services ===
Particularly in countries where the virus had a greater impact, online mental health services received a surge in demand, as COVID-19 social distancing obstructed patients from meeting with therapists or psychologists in person. In China, medical staff used social media programs like WeChat, Weibo, and TikTok to roll out online mental health education programs. In Canada, the provincial government of Alberta launched a $53 million COVID-19 mental health response plan, which included increasing accessibility to phone and online support with existing helplines. Additionally, the Canadian province of Ontario's government provided emergency funding of up to $12 million to expand online and virtual mental health support.

=== Effect of COVID-19 on mental health ===
There is an extensive psychology research proving that connectivity with others develops a sense of belonging and psychosocial well-being, which enhances mental health and reduces the risk of anxiety and depression. The overload of information and the constant use of social media have been shown to positively correlate with an increase in depression and anxiety, yet also with improvement in communication skills. The impact of following social distancing measures can cause feelings of loneliness and isolation in people, increasing anxiety and stress. Many adults are also reporting specific negative impacts on their mental health and well-being, such as difficulty sleeping (60%) or eating (80%), increases in alcohol consumption or substance abuse (50%), and worsening of chronic conditions (35%), due to worry and stress over education and employment conditions. While being part of a global pandemic can be stressful and cause anxiety, there are ways you can support yourself and your family.

=== Effect of COVID-19 on face-to-face communication ===
The increased use of face masks makes interpretation during face-to-face contact much more challenging because masks hide a large portion of the face, posing difficulties in reading basic communication signals like intention and emotion. Wearing a face mask causes individuals to focus on oral cues, leading to potential mistrust, misinterpretation, linguistic misunderstandings, and difficulties in comprehension. Alongside the disconnection caused by face masks, social distancing, and self-isolation, there are risks of increased social rejection, growing impersonality, individualism, and a loss of community. Data suggests that the implementation of face masks, increased social distancing, and self-isolation present challenges in fostering positive interpersonal relationships and a sense of community.

The new COVID-19 pneumonia epidemic has significantly affected the way people communicate with each other. Preventive measures to limit the spread of the virus require changes in communication patterns regarding greetings and handshakes. This situation has prompted people to adopt greetings that do not require physical contact, such as "peaceful gestures" and "hands on the chest". Additionally, telecommunications has seen a notable emphasis on personal space and social distance as business meetings, conferences, and educational activities shift to virtual communication through platforms like Zoom, Cisco WebEx, Skype, and Microsoft Teams.

=== Effect of COVID-19 on online businesses ===
The COVID-19 pandemic forced many businesses to shut down or implement remote work, leading to significant layoffs. Families were confined to home in self-isolation and quarantine as effective measures to prevent the spread of COVID-19. Since the start of the pandemic, many businesses have experienced a drastic increase in online orders. Those facing declining sales had to adapt to new consumer spending habits.

=== Effects of COVID-19 on visual arts ===
Global shutdowns compelled artists, museums, and galleries to explore new ways to engage with the public. The Getty Museum initiated a social media challenge encouraging users to recreate artworks from their collection using household items and share the results online. Galleries like David Zwirner moved scheduled exhibits to virtual spaces. Artist Benjamin Cook's Social Distance Gallery used Instagram to host mini thesis exhibitions for students worldwide who had their graduation shows cancelled.

=== Increased engagement ===
A study of people's internet and social media engagement from July 2019 to 2020 indicated a 10.5% increase in active social media users. Instagram reported a 70% surge in viewership of live videos from February to March when lockdown measures began. Another study conducted in July, four months after the initial COVID-19 lockdowns, surveyed individuals on their primary reasons for using social media and other connectivity technologies. Eighty-three percent of respondents stated that social media helped them cope with COVID-19-related lockdowns. This response was the highest, surpassing other reasons such as education (76%), staying in touch with friends and family (74%), and work-related activities (67%). It underscores the crucial role of social media in people's lives during the pandemic.

Due to the pandemic, people reduced their social activities to safeguard others. Students transitioned to online learning, with many relying on social media as a new study tool. Researchers have identified both advantages and disadvantages of using social media for studying. UNESCO reported that school closures affecting 890 million students across 114 countries disrupted traditional education. Social media became indispensable for students during the pandemic, providing an effective means to collaborate and develop skills while at home. For instance, collaborating with peers on social media enables students to learn communication and teamwork skills as they work together to solve problems.

== Use as entertainment ==
During the pandemic, numerous Internet memes emerged related to the COVID-19 situation. One notably popular Facebook group among young people, predominantly Generation Z, was "Zoom Memes for Self Quaranteens." This group humorously played on the pun of increased Zoom usage and self-quarantine among teenagers, amassing over 500,000 members as of April 2020. Members shared and created memes about the pandemic, providing entertainment for many young people who had transitioned to online schooling and needed ways to pass the time and cope with the situation.

Various social media challenges also gained traction during this period, serving to connect individuals and provide entertainment. One such example was the See10Do10 challenge, where participants performed and recreated 10 push-ups. Other challenges included sharing baby photos, participating in dance challenges, and voting in candy and chocolate March Madness bracket polls. Additionally, the V-pop hit "Ghen" by artists Erik and Men was remixed by lyricists Khắc Hưng to create "Ghen Cô Vy," which supported Vietnam's National Institute of Occupational Safety and Health with a song encouraging handwashing. The song went viral after dancer Quang Đăng posted a dance to it on TikTok, sparking the #GhenCoVyChallenge. Teens also used TikTok to create videos sharing their experiences in quarantine, using humour to relate to their peers and keep themselves entertained. From January to March 2020, TikTok experienced a 48.3% increase in unique visitors. Makeup artists on YouTube adapted their content to showcase makeup looks that accommodate mask-wearing during the pandemic.

In April, The Actors Fund organized a charity livestream of The Phantom of the Opera performance from London's Royal Albert Hall, which raised funds over 48 hours. Similarly, Phoebe Waller-Bridges's stage performance of Fleabag was streamed for charity and entertainment purposes Authors, musicians, actors, actresses, and dancers collaborated on numerous concerts, live streams of past productions, readings, and performances that were either free or required an entrance fee or suggested charitable donation.

== Spreading information ==
Social media has been used by news outlets, organizations, and the general public to disseminate both accurate information and misinformation about the pandemic. The CDC, WHO, medical journals, and healthcare organizations have been actively updating and sharing information across various platforms, often partnering with Facebook, Google Scholar, TikTok, and Twitter. Additionally, frontline healthcare professionals, such as emergency medicine physicians in New York hospitals, have utilized their social media accounts to provide firsthand accounts of combating COVID-19. A social listening study conducted from January 1 to March 19 indicated a significant increase in COVID-19-related conversations, with a 1,000% rise among healthcare professionals and a 2,500% increase among consumers. Despite hypotheses that increased public discourse and research would enhance trust in science during the pandemic, early studies reported null findings.

Accurate and reliable information disseminated through social media platforms plays a crucial role in combatting infodemics, misinformation, and rumors related to COVID-19. An article in The Lancet stated that real-time surveillance via social media can also serve as a valuable tool for public health agencies and organizations in implementing effective interventions.

Medical professionals have formed groups on social media to share information and insights on treating COVID-19. For instance, the PMG COVID-19 Subgroup on Facebook had approximately 30,000 members globally by the end of March, while the Physician Moms Group, established five years prior to the pandemic, experienced such high demand that Facebook's join feature temporarily malfunctioned.

Healthcare workers have used social media to educate the public about the challenges of wearing personal protective equipment (PPE) for extended shifts. Many participated in trends showcasing their faces post-shift, revealing marks and injuries caused by prolonged mask use.

=== Government use of social media ===
Governments have utilized social media extensively during the pandemic. The Chinese government, for example, has employed social media to disseminate scientific information about COVID-19 in accessible language to aid public understanding. In contrast, Australian health authorities have focused less on platforms popular among younger demographics, such as Instagram and TikTok, when sharing COVID-19 information. Researchers argue that effective governmental use of social media can mitigate public panic and contribute to societal stability. Governments should take proactive measures to communicate effectively on social media using language that resonates with the public, thereby reducing the spread of misinformation and fostering social stability based on evidence-backed information.

=== Role of World Health Organization and other international organizations ===
The COVID-19 pandemic significantly amplified the World Health Organizations (WHO) utilization of social media. In response to the declaration of COVID-19 as a Public Health Emergency, the WHO Information Network for Epidemics was established. This platform, staffed by 20 individuals, is dedicated to providing evidence-based responses to counteract rumours circulating across various social media platforms. It ensures that searches related to "coronavirus" on social media and Google direct users to reliable information sources such as the WHO website or the Centers for Disease Control and Prevention.

In April 2020, the United Nations launched the United Nations Communications Response initiative aimed at curbing the spread of misinformation during the pandemic. This initiative sought to mitigate hate speech and prevent disinformation from exacerbating political divisions online. Additionally, on 11 May 2020, the United Nations issued a Guidance Note on Addressing and Countering COVID-19-related Hate Speech, further targeting misinformation challenges online.

=== Limitations in the use of social media to spread information ===
Social media platforms do not uniformly impact all demographics. Older age groups often do not utilize social media as extensively as younger populations, preferring traditional communication channels. Approximately 69% of individuals aged 50 to 64 engage with some form of social media, highlighting the necessity to devise alternative methods to reach the remaining 31% of this demographic.

Social media lack editorial oversight. Unlike peer-reviewed publications, there is no mandatory peer review process for content posted online, contributing to the proliferation of misinformation. Although social media platforms employ fact-checking teams, it remains impractical to manually verify every piece of content posted across these platforms.

== Misinformation ==
The COVID-19 pandemic has been characterized as the first major "social-media infodemic" by MIT Technology Review, highlighting social media's pivotal role as the primary source of information and communication during this period. National Geographic reported a surge in "fake animal news" circulated on social media platforms during the pandemic. Research indicates a significant shift in information consumption patterns, with many individuals increasingly relying on social media over traditional search engines and browsers, thereby influencing behaviors and potentially undermining government response efforts to the virus.

There is preliminary evidence suggesting that public trust in science and scientists may influence the perceived credibility of COVID-19 misinformation. However, caution is advised in interpreting these findings pending further study.

Social media platforms, including Twitter, have become crucial channels for news updates, although concerns persist regarding the proliferation of misinformation disseminated through automated “bot” accounts. The challenge of distinguishing reliable information sources from misinformation has contributed to varying levels of skepticism and distrust among users.

Misinformation varies widely across countries and can be disseminated intentionally or inadvertently, exacerbating the severity of the pandemic.

The algorithms behind some social platforms may have inadvertently facilitated the spread of misinformation. This was due to increased AI usage when many human moderators were unable to work effectively during shelter in place orders or faced contractual restrictions, which compromised their ability to effectively manage content and prevent the dissemination of COVID-19 misinformation.

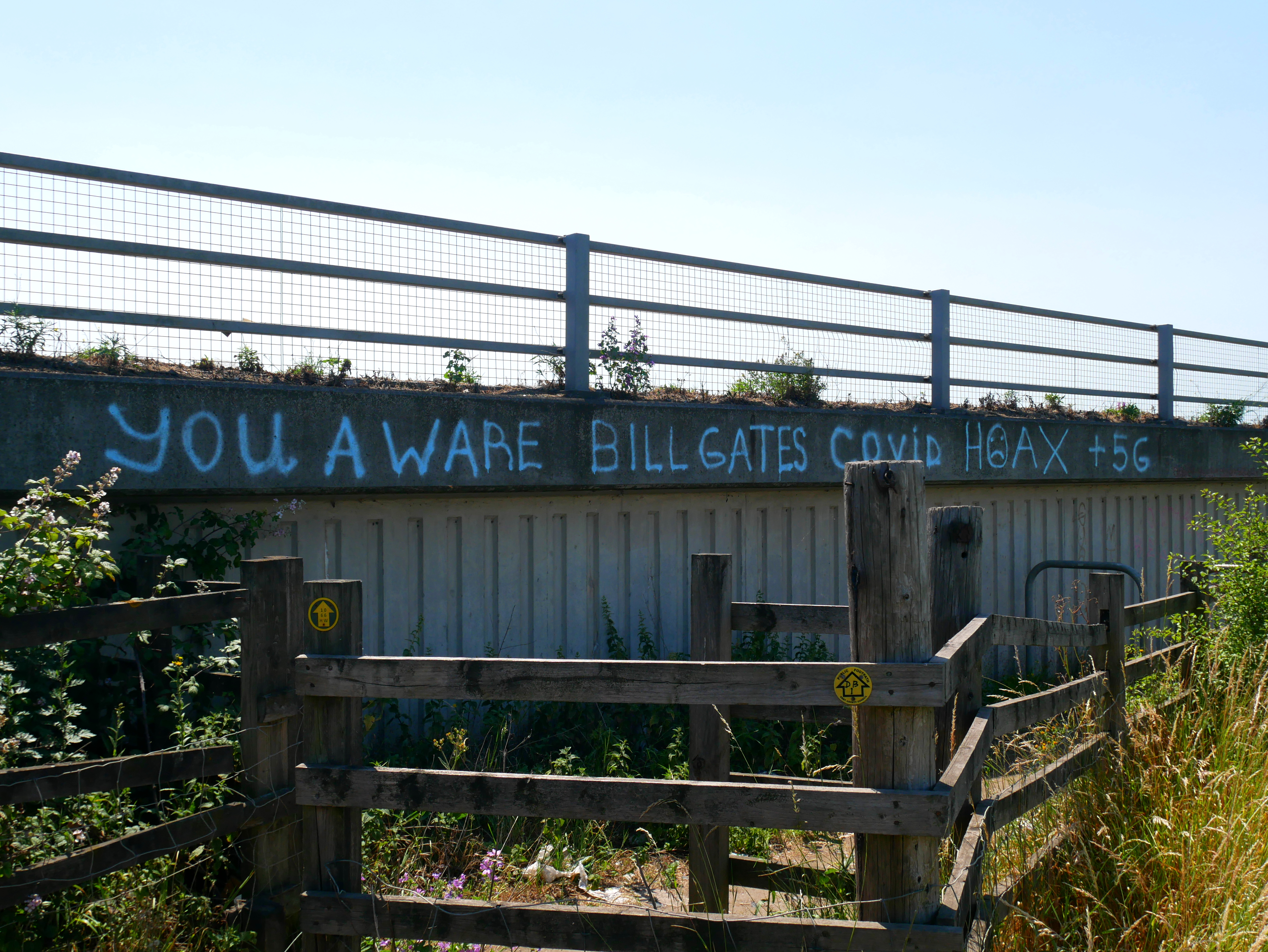
Graffiti featuring 5G misinformation on COVID-19.

Multiple news outlets, including Fox News, BBC and The Independent, reported instances where social media groups spread rumors opposing vaccines and 5G mobile phone networks. 5G and microwave opposition groups used Facebook to share articles claiming, "Hunan coronavirus is an engineered bio-weapon" These online rumors led to physical attacks by mobs in India, mass poisonings in Iran, and vandalism of phone masts and service technicians in the United Kingdom, the Netherlands and elsewhere.

Social media has become a primary source of misinformation during the pandemic. In China, misinformation spread through platforms like Messenger included false reports that fireworks could kill the virus in the air, and that vinegar and indigowoad root could cure infections. This misinformation resulted in panic-buying of supplies, depleting resources needed by professionals. Additionally, outdated claims, such as the reported benefits of Hydroxychloroquine, continued to circulate despite WHO ending trials due to safety concerns, potentially risking patient safety.

Misinformation and conspiracy theories related to COVID-19 have been flagged, removed, or restricted by Facebook and Instagram on their respective social media platforms. For instance, Facebook has taken measures to curb false claims about cures and prevention methods. However, the efficacy of Facebook's third-party fact-checkers in limiting the spread of false content by notifying and providing accurate information to users remains varied.

A study conducted in May 2021 identified that a small number of individuals were responsible for a significant portion (85%) of false information surrounding COVID-19 vaccines circulating on social media, prompting actions such as content blocking for some of these prolific disseminators, colloquially known as the "Disinformation Dozen."

Older adults are often exposed to misinformation on social media platforms. Research by the WHO indicates that over half (59.1%) of those surveyed are aware of and can recognize COVID-19-related fake news. Consequently, misinformation significantly impacts young people as well, with 60.1% reportedly disregarding false information encountered on social media. Addressing this challenge not only involves helping individuals identify misinformation but also mobilizing efforts to actively counter and mitigate its effects.

== Usage by celebrities ==
Throughout the pandemic, many celebrities utilized social media platforms to engage with their fan bases and address the challenging circumstances through various means, including posts, acts of kindness, or participation in trends. Some celebrities faced swift public criticism for their posts, such as Gwyneth Paltrow, who deleted an Instagram post showcasing designer fashion, and Jared Leto, who sparked controversy with a Twitter post emerging 12-day silent meditation isolation in the desert. Similarly, Ellen DeGeneres and Gal Gadot received backlash for their social media activities, with DeGeneres criticized for comments about quarantine life in her California mansion, and Gadot for organizing a celebrity rendition of John Lennon's "Imagine."

Several celebrities or their family members also used social media to announce their positive COVID-19 diagnoses, including Tom Hanks and Rita Wilson, Idris Elba, and Daniel Dae Kim used his platform to highlight donating plasma containing active antibodies to a Vitalant blood donation center, potentially aiding others affected by the virus. Notably, a controversial Instagram post by K-Pop Star Kim Jae-joong, claiming a COVID-19 hospitalization later revealed as an April Fools' Day Prank, aimed to raise awareness about the pandemic.

Moreover, celebrities leveraged social media to promote charitable action during the pandemic. For instance, Ansel Elgort used his Instagram platform creatively, drawing attention to a GoFundMe campaign by actor Jeffrey Wright aimed at feeding frontline workers, albeit initially raising eyebrows with a provocative post captioned "OnlyFans LINK IN BIO."

== Usage by world leaders ==
On 7 April 2020, former U.S. President Donald Trump utilized Twitter and the #AmericaWorksTogether hashtag to highlight companies aiding in mitigating the economic impacts of the virus by hiring employees and supplying health workers with necessary equipment.

Queen Elizabeth II and other members of the British royal family have also used social media to communicate with the public. Comments from the Queen were shared on the royal family's Instagram account, and in the lead-up to V-E Day, information based on the Queen's memories from a 1985 interview was posted on Instagram. Several royal family members participated in Zoom calls with nurses to commemorate International Nurses Day, which subsequently posted on their YouTube page. Prince William, Duke of Cambridgem and Catherine, Duchess of Cambridge allowed their Instagram account to be "taken over" for 24-hours by Shout85258, the UK's first 24/7 crisis text line they launched with Prince Harry, Duke of Sussex and Meghan, Duchess of Sussex in May 2019. The Dutch royal family used their Instagram account to share a video of King Willem-Alexander, Queen Máxima and their teenage daughters clapping for first responders, accompanied by a brief speech by the King.

== Censorship ==
In Turkey, more than 400 individuals were arrested for posting "provocative" messages about the pandemic on social media. Chinese social media networks, such as WeChat have reportedly censored terms related to the pandemic since 31 December 2019. Notably, Dr. Li Wenliang was censored by the Wuhan police for posting about the pandemic in a private group chat. Doctors in China were instructed by local authorities to delete social media posts appealing for donations of medical supplies.

NetBlocks, a civil society group advocating for digital rights, cybersecurity, and Internet governance, reported internet outages in Wuhan during the pandemic. They also noted that the Farsi version of Wikipedia was blocked for 24 hours in Iran. The VPN company Surfshark reported a roughly 50% drop-off in its network usage in Iran after the pandemic was declared on 13 March by the WHO.

In an August 2024 letter to the American House Judiciary committee, Meta chairman Mark Zuckerberg wrote "In 2021, senior officials from the Biden Administration, including the White House, repeatedly pressured our teams for months to censor certain COVID-19 content, including humor and satire" and continued that "[he feels] strongly that we should not compromise our content standards due to pressure from any Administration in either direction – and we’re ready to push back if something like this happens again".
