= Die drei Rulands =

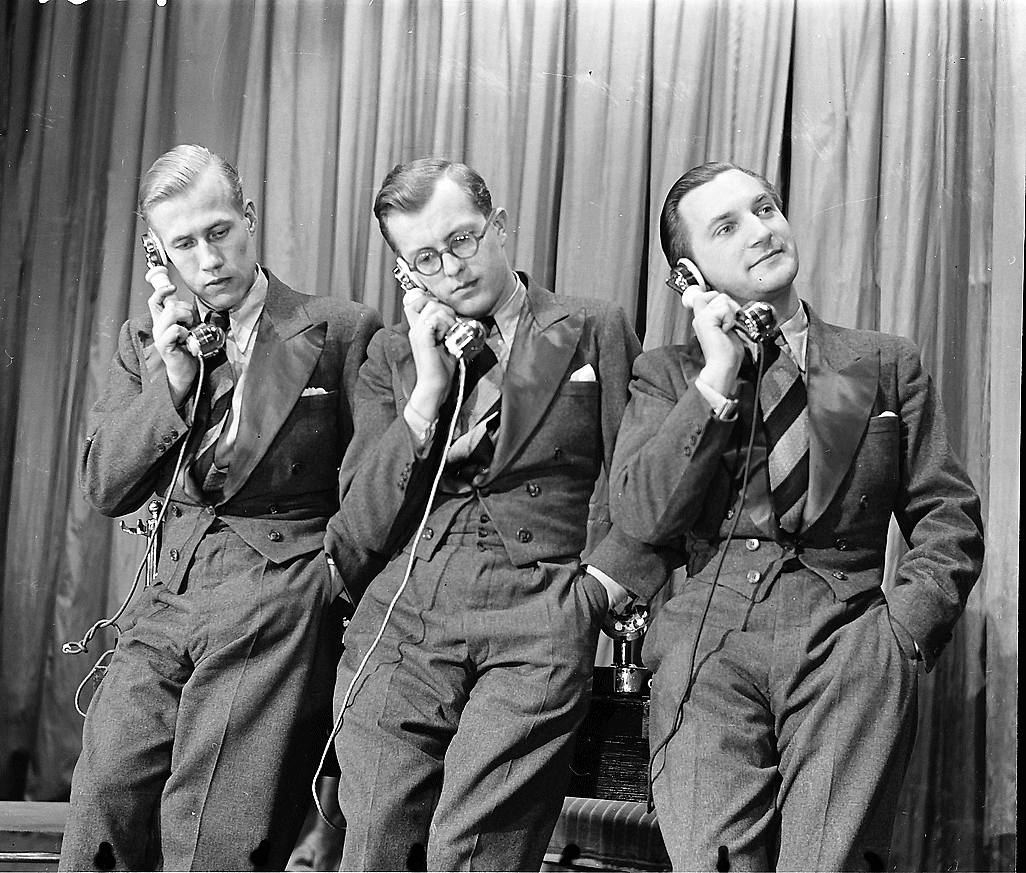
Die drei Rulands

Die drei Rulands (English: The Three Rulands) were a vocal group and comedians during the 1930s in Nazi Germany. In January 1939 they performed a number in a Berlin Cabaret mocking Adolf Hitler's and Albert Speer's architectural plans for the new Berlin. In the following month this led to Josef Goebbels banning them for life from performing in public.

== Biography ==
The three vocalists Wilhelm Meißner (tenor), Heinz Woezel (bariton) and Manfred Dlugi (bass) were discovered for the Berlin Kabarett Die Katakombe (English: The Catacomb) in 1933 and started performing there in fall of the same year under the name Die Katakoben-Jungs (English: The Guys of the Catacomb). They also published their first record with songs based on works of Joachim Ringelnatz that year. In 1934 Woezel separated from the trio and was replaced by Helmut Buth. In addition to their live performances they also started to provide vocals for the recordings of various orchestras.

In 1935 Die Katakombe was closed down by the Nazi government disapproving of its political jokes. With their homebase gone the trio changed its name to Die drei Rulands (English: The Three Rulands) alluding to the figure of Roland and the Roland statues. They performed now at the Wintergarten and the Kabarett der Komiker in Berlin. With the popular Comedian Harmonists being banned and dissolved the Rulands took over their position in the German entertainment landscape. They published new records, appeared in several movies including Sein bester Freund by Harry Piel and got their own rubric called the Rulands-Eck (English: Ruland's corner) in the monthly radio show Das interessiert auch dich! (English: This interest you as well).

With their popularity rising the Rulands became of interest for the Reich Ministry of Public Enlightenment and Propaganda and in 1938 shortly after the Kristallnacht (November pogroms against the Jewish population), the Rulands, who were neither NSDAP members nor were known for any antisemitic remarks in their past, sang Ham Se nicht den kleinen Cohn gesehn? on their radio broadcast of Rulands-Eck. The song downplayed the violence of the pogroms and pushed antisemitic stereotypes.

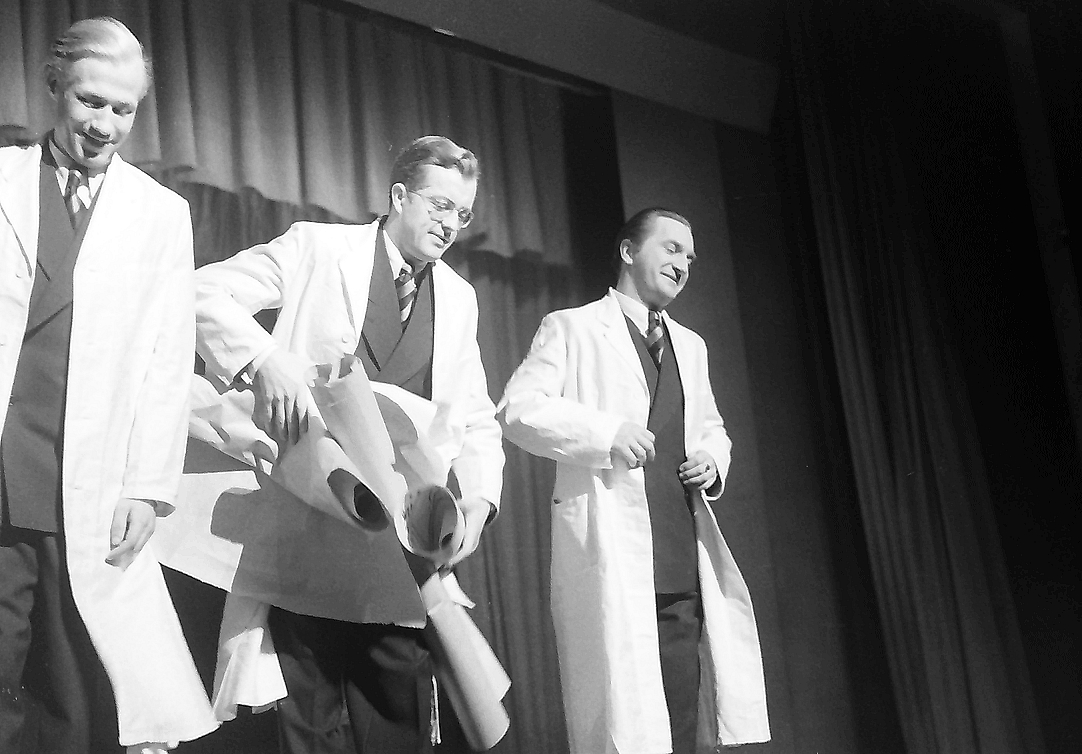
Die drei Rulands as Stadtbauarchitekten (1939)

In January 1939 at the peak of their careers the Rulands began performing a number entitled Die drei Stadtbauarchitekten (English: The Three City Architects) at the Kabarett der Komiker to enthusiastic audiences. In it they made fun of the Nazi plans to redesign Berlin. This drew the ire of the Reich minister for propaganda Josef Goebbels, who expelled them together with their fellow comedians Werner Finck and Peter Sachse from the Reich Chamber of Culture, which meant a lifelong ban from performing. In a press release Goebbels noted, that the Rulands had ridiculed the institutions of state and party and that they lacked any positive attitude towards the national socialism. Subsequently Meißner and Buth were drafted into the Wehrmacht and Dlugi into the Reich Labour Service.

All three survived World War II and shortly reunited to perform together again. However they could not reestablish their former popularity and pursued separate careers instead.

== Records ==
Aside from their originally publications in the 1930s a CD with some of their recording was issued in 2001:

- Die Drei Rulands: Lachen Ist Trumpf. da music / Deutsche Austrophon 2001, EAN 4012772013030
