= QuarantineChat =

Social networking service launched during COVID-19 pandemic

- The notification received after the user has registered on the QuarantineChat website and downloaded Dialup
- Developer: Danielle Baskin; Max Hawkins
- Type: Voiced-based social networking service
- Launched: 1 March 2020
- Operating systems: iOS; Android
- Status: Active
- Website: https://quarantinechat.com/

QuarantineChat is a multilingual voice-based social networking service launched on March 1, 2020, by multimedia artists Danielle Baskin and Max Hawkins. The service is part of Dialup, an application with the same premise. The service is made for people to stay connected with other people amid the COVID-19 pandemic at select times during the day. As of late April 2020, it has reported to have more than 15,000 users.

== History ==
Hawkins developed an early iteration of the service in 2012 named Call in the Night, that connects people in the same time zones between 2 a.m. and 5 a.m. for "conversations about dreams." Baskin and Hawkins met at a Halloween party, where Baskin gave Hawkins a tarot reading. According to Baskin, the reading said that they were interested in "phone stuff," which possibly prompted Hawkins to share his idea. In 2019, they launched the app Dialup.

A year later, as COVID-19 spread rapidly in China, Hawkins' girlfriend talked about boredom while staying at home, which prompted Hawkins and Baskin to create QuarantineChat. The service was then launched on March 1. She hopes that the service "brings magic and serendipity to a new reality where thousands of people are stuck inside alone for the next month." Baskin, via Business Insider Australia, said that the purpose of the service is to "unify people using humour."

Usage was then noticed in Iran, Hong Kong, Portugal, and London, with the most users based on time zones are in the Pacific and Iran Standard Time. As of March 11, there were 70 users detected, with the number increasing to 15,000 on May 27.

== Technique ==
Users register their phone numbers via the QuarantineChat website. They then download the Dialup app via the App Store or Play Store, depending on their mobile device's operating system (OS). Once users open the app and redeem the invitation given, an alert will pop up, explaining how the service works. Users can also select conversation themes, so that the system can connect users of the same interest. Prior to a random call arriving, the app will notify the user via a pre-recorded message. Often it will give a conversation prompt. Once a call arrives, users tap the button and will be able to call a random stranger. If the user's phone is not on, the system will divert the call to another user.

== Responses ==
The service has gotten generally positive reviews. Technology website Gadgets360 states that "it simulates the magic of having a surprise conversation with a complete stranger, who is stuck at home as well due to this viral epidemic." The New York Times states, "Each conversation provided me with the illusion of floating, even briefly, into the slipstream of someone else's life. The conversations were, for the most part, effortless, inconsequential. I didn't know when they were going to come, and I didn't know where they were going to go. When I hung up, I felt transported." Mashable's Anna Iovine stated, "There may be days I don't pick up the phone [...], but having the option of meeting someone new in a time where I can't meet anyone is a luxury." A CBS News reporter showed skepticism over whether it would be popular, saying "On Instagram, we're friends with people that we don't even know. So I don't think it'd be that big of a difference."

Via the online publication Built In, Hawkins said that "more users have reported that the lack of video (as in videotelephony) frees them of image-consciousness."

== See also ==
- Impact of the COVID-19 pandemic on social media
- Mental health during the COVID-19 pandemic
- Long-distance relationships
