= Rehabilitation after COVID-19 =

Rehabilitation after COVID-19 is needed in individuals experiencing longer-term disabling illness at any stage of COVID-19 infection. The rehabilitation of individuals with COVID-19 includes screening for the need for rehabilitation, participation of a multi-disciplinary team to evaluate and manage the individual's disabilities, use of four evidence based classes for rehabilitation (exercise, practice, psychosocial support and education), as well as individualised interventions for other problems.

== Scope ==
The range of problems suffered by individuals after COVID-19 have, as of January 2021, not yet been well described in scientific literature. Individuals with COVID-19 have developed several complications, such as respiratory failure, renal failure, myocarditis, encephalitis, impaired immunologic response and blood clotting disorders. However, COVID-19 can affect any organ system, and can therefore have any symptoms and signs. Individuals with COVID-19 can also have psychological conditions such as anxiety or depression. People who required mechanical ventilation while they had COVID-19 may have injury to the airways, weakened muscles, delirium and post-traumatic stress disorder. Those with COVID-19 can have reduced ability to perform activities of daily living.

== Approach ==
There is limited data regarding rehabilitation after COVID-19 due to the recent nature of the disease. The general pulmonary rehabilitation method based on 4S principle (simple, safe, satisfy, save) has been proposed in China for pulmonary rehabilitation, particularly in individuals who were admitted to ICU. A recent study concluded that a six-week respiratory rehabilitation program improves respiratory function and quality of life as well as decreases anxiety in older individuals with COVID-19. Early active mobilization has been recommended by one study for improving muscle strength and mobility after discharge from hospital in individuals with COVID-19.

For individuals experiencing post-COVID fatigue, an approach based upon recommendations for myalgic encephalomyelitis/chronic fatigue syndrome (ME/CFS) is recommended. There is some early support for this approach. For example, a 7-week virtual rehabilitation course developed by Bradford District Care NHS Foundation Trust supported people to improve their sleep, manage energy levels (e.g. by striking a balance between rest and activity using pacing), optimise their breathing and manage stress. A study evaluating the service found that patients completing the course significantly improved their quality of life. However, although quality of life was improved, it did not return to pre-COVID levels for the majority of patients. These findings suggest that post-COVID syndrome is likely to be a long-term condition that requires ongoing rehabilitation.

== Challenges ==
In the context of the pandemic, face-to-face interactions are likely to be minimised. Therefore, tele-rehabilitation systems could be used to address the difficulties associated with the ongoing pandemic. The limitations of virtual care are technical malfunctions, lack of availability of equipment and limited scope for physical examination. The pandemic situation has reduced the ability to meet the typical needs in rehabilitation such as social interaction and human contact among caregivers and family members, thereby limiting the available options for multidisciplinary rehabilitation.

== See also ==
- COVID-19 fatigue
