= Pandemic fatigue =

Psychological phenomenon

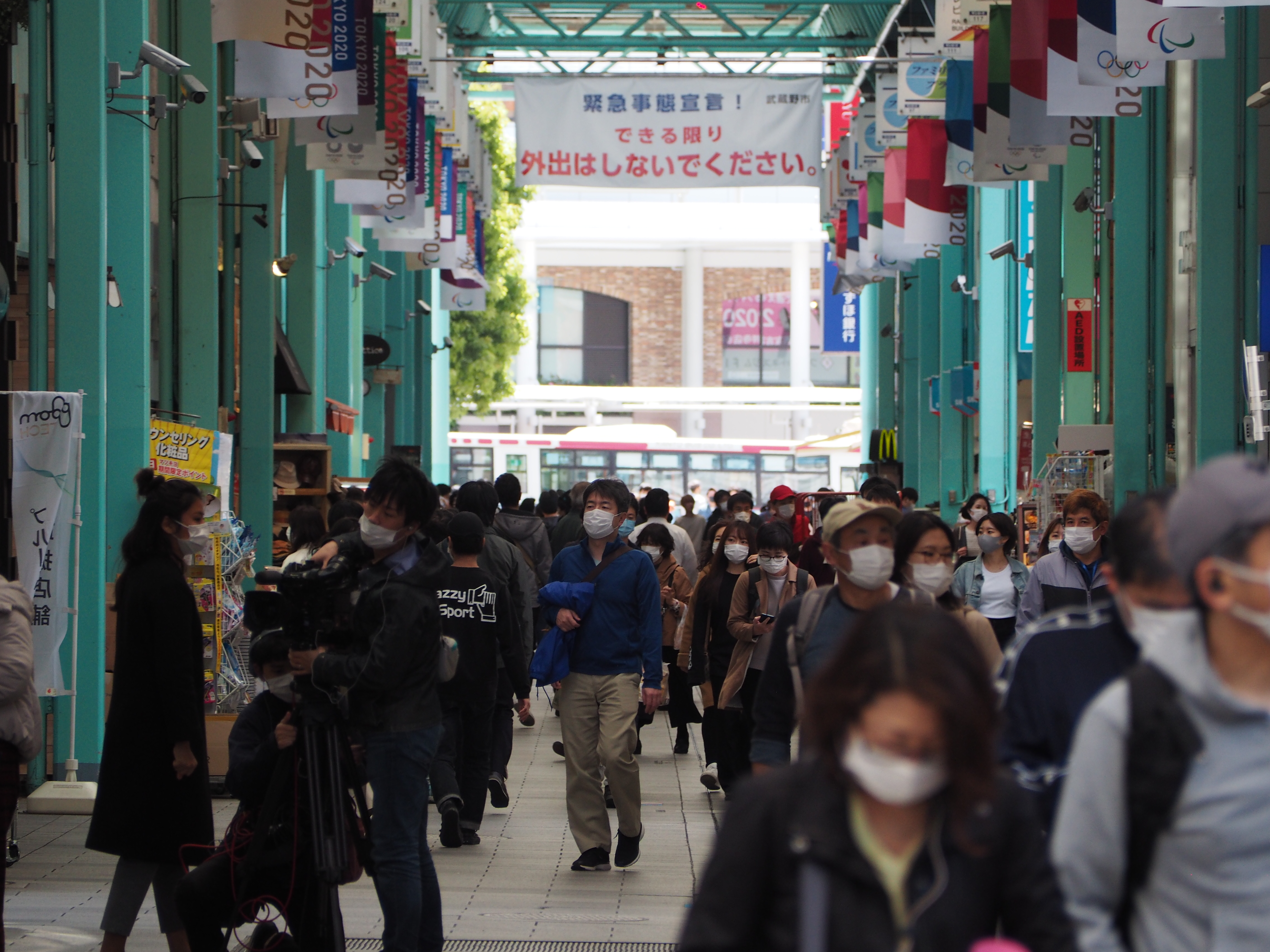
Crowds that go against the advice of health officials can be seen during pandemic fatigue. Here, shoppers visit a shopping district in Tokyo despite a stay-at-home advisory during the official lockdown period of the COVID-19 pandemic.

Pandemic fatigue is understood as a natural and expected reaction to sustained and unresolved adversity in people's everyday life. Those affected show symptoms of feeling burnt out and tired, while also expressing feelings of demotivation to engage in protection behaviors and seek COVID-19 related information as complacency, alienation and hopelessness.

== Social norms ==
Social norms can have an effect on pandemic fatigue.

During the official lockdown periods of the COVID 19 pandemic people became a lot more stressed because they couldn't leave their homes. Not being able to physically see their family and friends, made people become lonely and depressed. Numerous couples that were living together broke up and married couples separated and filed for divorce. "During the pandemic interest in divorces skyrocketed 34% in the U.S." "Newly married couples were the most likely to file for divorce." Towards the end of the 2021 people slowly started to go out and enjoy themselves again. While interacting people weren't hugging right away or shaking people's hands. Everyone had to practice social distancing, social distancing was new for everyone and definitely an adjustment.

== Political distrust ==
Political distrust can have an effect on pandemic fatigue as well. "Crisis fatigue" is the idea the public has become immune to warnings from politicians and distrustful of their claims. The public has been exposed to several crises in the past two decades, including SARS in 2003, bird flu in 2005, swine flu in 2009, MERS in 2012, Ebola in 2014 and COVID-19 in 2020–2022. Because of this, some people find it hard to trust political officials and their suggestions on how to treat and manage COVID-19. This makes people tired and hence, leads to increased number of cases.

== Response ==
Epidemiologist Julia Marcus wrote that indefinite abstention from all social contact was not a sustainable way to contain a pandemic. Drawing from lessons in HIV prevention, she advised a principle of harm reduction rather than an "all-or-nothing approach" in controlling the COVID-19 pandemic.

=== Lockdowns ===
With many countries having a rise in new cases from Variants of SARS-CoV-2, more waves of lockdowns have been put in effect. Countries like the UK have been put back into COVID-19 lockdowns and due to this, many citizens there have been in this state of fatigue and exhaustion. Studies show that people are finding it harder to stay positive, with 60% of citizens in the UK saying they are finding it harder to stay positive daily compared to before the pandemic – an 8-point increase.

=== Coping methods ===
One of the major ways with coping with pandemic fatigue is limiting the amount of time you spend on your device. Most common during the COVID 19 pandemic was Doomscrolling, or purposely tuning in to negative stories on TV or on social media, fuels increased dread, uncertainty, anxiety, and fatigue." Another method he found to be very useful in his studies was being active. "If you make movement a priority, you will find a way to make it happen. Prioritizing time to exercise and meditate by putting it in your schedule and protecting that time is going to make a huge difference in your mental health". Other forms of coping include meditation and finding time for yourself to reflect.

== COVID-19 pandemic ==
COVID-19 fatigue is the state of being worn out about the precautionary measures and the threat of COVID-19. Anxiety from the threat of losing economic security and catching the disease both play a part in the feeling of fatigue in people. COVID-19 fatigue has caused people to not follow precautionary guidelines, increasing their risk of catching the virus. Many people are tired of the lockdowns, and not having a normal routine. Higher levels of alcohol and drug use also contribute to the feeling of tiredness.

As lockdowns were lifted in many parts of the world, some people started to ignore stay-at-home orders. People went to bars and restaurants, ultimately causing the disease to spread faster.

In a 29 November 2022 Proceedings of the National Academy of Sciences (PNAS) article, researchers correlated pandemic fatigue with indicators of discontent experienced by individuals including, "opposition to COVID-19 restrictions", "protesting over restrictions", "belief in COVID-19 conspiracies", "concern about democratic rights", "government distrust", and "support for strong leaders".

== Zoom fatigue ==
Zoom fatigue is described as tiredness, anxiety, or worry resulting from overusing virtual videoconferencing platforms. Zoom calls may limit the amount of nonverbal cues the brain picks up during face-to-face interactions. The absence of these cues causes the brain to subconsciously exert more energy, leading to feelings of irritability and exhaustion after video calls. Another issue with Zoom is the close proximity of faces on the screen, which can trigger a sense of danger. Although the body recognizes being in a safe place, the mind remains on high alert. Virtual Reality allows for "avatars" to interact with each other and gives the user the sensation that they are actually there, while still maintaining safe distances during lockdowns.

== See also ==
- Compassion fade
- Mental health during the COVID-19 pandemic
- AIDS fatigue (and "condom fatigue")
