= Impact of the COVID-19 pandemic on time perception =

The impact of the COVID-19 pandemic on time perception, or the 2020 effect, refers to the widespread phenomenon of distorted time perception experienced during the COVID-19 pandemic, particularly the sensation that time was moving unusually slowly or that days blurred together. This effect has been documented in psychological, sociological, and neuroscientific research as a response to the collective trauma, stress, and disruption of daily routines caused by the pandemic.

During the early months of the COVID-19 pandemic, people around the world reported that time felt "stretched", with days and weeks blending together, along with difficulty in recalling a sequence of recent events. This phenomenon, sometimes called "temporal disintegration" in psychiatric literature, is characterized by impaired sequential thinking and a sense that the present is disconnected from the continuity of time and future. People whose routines were the most disrupted were the most affected by distorted time perception.

Multiple factors such as social isolation and monotony, emotional distress, and routine disruption, contributed to the 2020 effect.

A national study found that over 65% of respondents in the United States reported difficulty of telling a difference between weekdays and weekends, uncertainty and anxiety about the future, and either time speeding up or slowing down for some during the first six months of the pandemic. Sociologists using Gallup data documented multifaceted time disorientation, with Americans reporting both slowness and quickness of time, as well as days blending together. These distortions were closely linked to pandemic-related stressors, such as economic hardship, working from home, homeschooling, and household conflict.

Experiencing the 2020 effect was associated with lower levels of mental well-being and increased feelings of loneliness. Temporal disintegration, or the breakdown of regular time perception, is considered a risk factor for mental health challenges, particularly in the context of collective trauma.

== See also ==
- Historical trauma
- Mental health during the COVID-19 pandemic
