= Danielle Baskin =

American artist

- Known for: Conceptual art
- Website: daniellebaskin.com

Danielle Baskin is an American conceptual artist based in San Francisco.

Baskin has created multiple businesses, often as the offshoots of performance art. These include Branded Fruit, which sells fruit with printed corporate logos.

== Dialup ==
Dialup is an app that connects strangers for phone calls on pre-determined topics. It powers her related project QuarantineChat.

== Blue Check Homes ==
On Friday January 29th 2021, Baskin launched a fake service (bluecheckhomes.com) for public figures to adorn their homes with physical blue check crests, as a satire on then Twitter’s blue checks. Hundreds attempted to sign-up for the service which mimicked Twitter’s verification process.

== Spirit Halloween at vacant Google office ==
Baskin made and posted a replica of a Spirit Halloween Store banner on a vacant Google office in San Francisco on Monday September 20th 2021. She recruited a group of friends to dress-up as Spirit store staff at the installation.

== SF 7-Eleven Onigiri Installation ==
On Thursday March 21st 2024, Baskin installed home made onigiri snacks packaged in wrapping with then San Francisco mayor London Breed’s face on them inside a 7-Eleven store in San Francisco. Baskin announced the onigiri on social media which was widely viewed and resulted in customers asking store employees for them.
