= Men who have sex with men =

Behavioral category

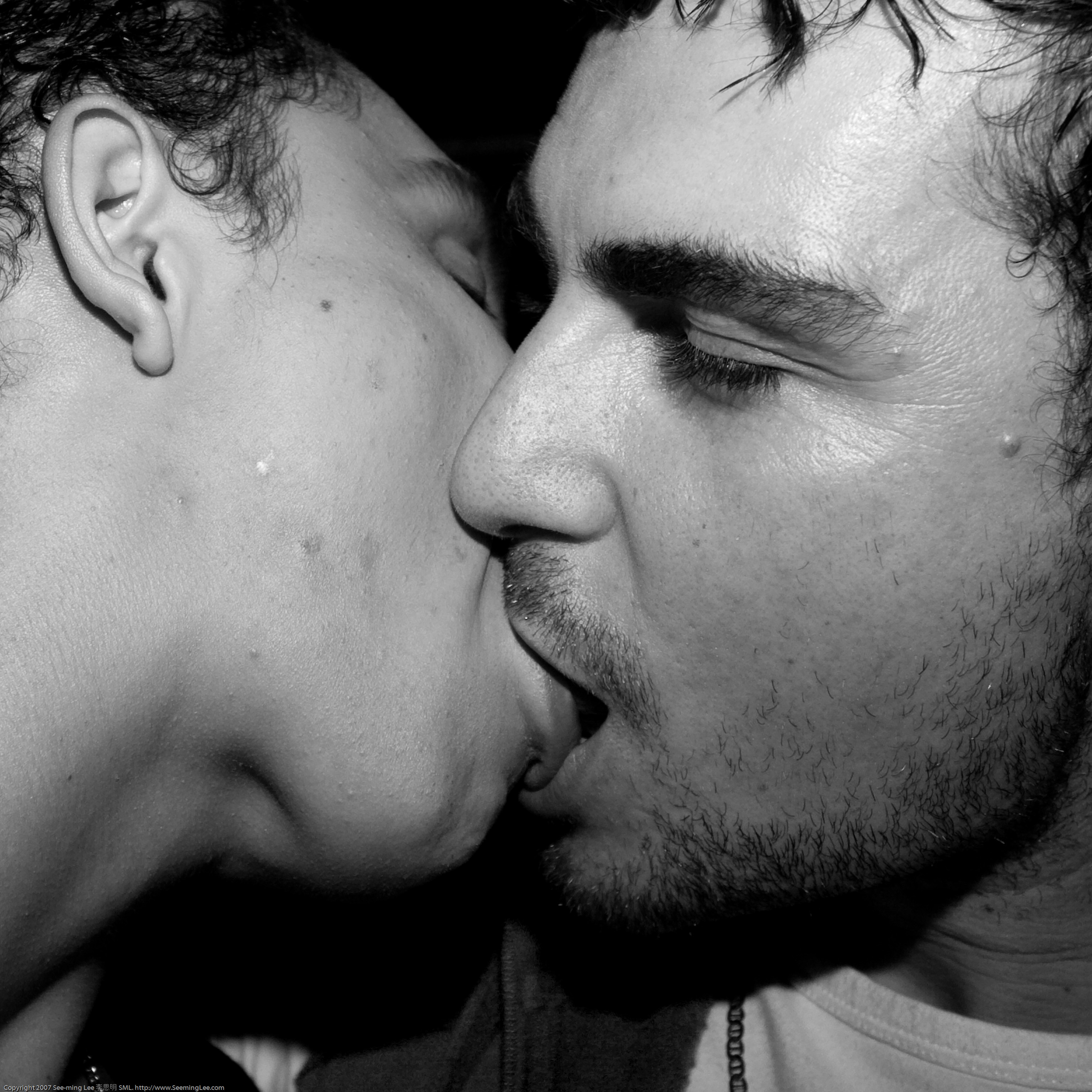
Men kissing intimately

Men who have sex with men (MSM) are men who engage in sexual activity with other men, regardless of their sexual orientation or sexual identity. The term was created by epidemiologists in the 1990s, to better study and communicate the spread of sexually transmitted infections such as HIV/AIDS between all sexually active males, not strictly those identifying as gay, bisexual, pansexual or various other sexualities, but also for example male prostitutes. The term is often used in medical literature and social research to describe such men as a group. It does not describe any specific kind of sexual activity, and which activities are covered by the term depends on context. The alternative term "males who have sex with males" is sometimes considered more accurate in cases where those described may not be legal adults.

== As a constructed category ==
The term men who have sex with men had been in use in public health discussions, especially in the context of HIV/AIDS, since 1990 or earlier, but the coining of the initialism by Glick et al. in 1994 "signaled the crystallization of a new concept." This behavioral concept comes from two distinct academic perspectives. First, it was pursued by epidemiologists seeking behavioral categories that would offer better analytical concepts for the study of disease-risk than identity-based categories (such as "gay", "bisexual", or "straight"), because a man who self-identifies as straight may nonetheless be sexually active with other men; similarly, a man who self-identifies as gay or bisexual is not necessarily sexually active with other men. Second, the concept's usage is tied to criticism of sexual identity terms prevalent in social construction literature, which typically rejected the use of identity-based concepts across cultural and historical contexts. The Huffington Post postulates that the term MSM was created by Cleo Manago, who is also credited for coining the term "same gender loving" (SGL).

MSM are not limited to small, self-identified, and visible sub-populations. MSM and gay refer to different things: behaviors and social identities. MSM refers to sexual activities between men, regardless of how they identify, whereas gay can include those activities but is more broadly seen as a cultural identity. Homosexuality refers to sexual/romantic attraction between members of the same sex and may or may not include romantic relationships. Gay is a social identity and is generally the preferred social term, whereas homosexual is used in formal contexts, though the terms are not entirely interchangeable. Men who are non-heterosexual or questioning may identify with all, none, a combination of these, or one of the newer terms indicating a similar sexual, romantic, and cultural identity like bi-curious.

In their assessment of the knowledge about the sexual networks and behaviors of MSM in Asia, Dowsett, Grierson and McNally concluded that the category of MSM does not correspond to a single social identity in any of the countries they studied. There were no similar traits in all of the MSM population studied, other than them being males and engaging in sex with other men.

In some countries, homosexual relationships may be illegal or taboo, making MSM difficult to reach.

The term's precise use and definition has varied with regard to transgender and intersex people, who do not fall neatly into binary sex categories.

== Sexual practices ==
Historically, anal sex has been popularly associated with male homosexuality and MSM. However, many MSM do not engage in anal sex, and may engage in oral sex, frotting or mutual masturbation instead. Among men who have anal sex with other men, the insertive partner may be referred to as the top, the one being penetrated may be referred to as the bottom, and those who engage in either role may be referred to as versatile—with those who do not prefer/practice anal sex being referred to as side.

=== Number of sexual partners ===
A 2007 study reported that two large population surveys found "the majority of gay men had similar numbers of unprotected sexual partners annually as straight men and women." According to the 2013 NATSAL (a representative population study in the UK), MSM typically had 17 lifetime sexual partners (median), which included all forms of sexual contact including oral and anal sex. An epidemiological article in The BMJ reported that national probability surveys like the NATSAL have been found to better reflect the population of MSM but are limited by their smaller samples of MSM. Convenience sample surveys recruit larger samples of MSM but tend to over-represent MSM identifying as gay and reporting more sexual risk behaviors.

== Health ==
=== Sexually transmitted infections ===
Among men who have anal sex with other men, anal sex without use of a condom is considered to be high-risk for STI transmission. A person who inserts their penis into an infected partner is at risk because sexually transmitted infections (STIs) can enter through the urethra or through small cuts, abrasions, or open sores on the penis. Also, condoms are more likely to break during anal sex than during vaginal sex. Thus, even with a condom, anal sex can be risky.

==== HIV/AIDS ====
Acquired immune deficiency syndrome (AIDS) is a disease of the human immune system caused by the human immunodeficiency virus (HIV). HIV can infect anybody, regardless of sex, ethnicity, or sexual orientation. Worldwide, an estimated 5–10% of HIV infections are the result of men having sex with men. However, in many developed countries, more HIV infections are transmitted by men having sex with men than by any other transmission route. In the United States, "men who have had sex with men since 1977 have an HIV prevalence (the total number of cases of a disease that are present in a population at a specific point in time) 60 times higher than the general population".

In 2007, the largest estimated proportion of HIV/AIDS diagnoses among adults and adolescents in the U.S. were men who have sex with men (MSM). While this category is only 2% of the U.S. population they accounted for 53% of the overall diagnoses and 71% among men. According to a 2010 federal study, one in five men who have sex with men are HIV positive and nearly half do not realize it.

According to a CDC study, HIV prevalence in the MSM population of the U.S. varies widely by ethnicity. "As many as 46% of black MSM have HIV" while "the HIV rate is estimated at 21% for white MSM and 17% for Hispanic MSM." In the United States from 2001 to 2005, the highest transmission risk behaviors were sex between men (40–49% of new cases) and high risk heterosexual sex (32–35% of new cases). HIV infection is increasing at a rate of 12% annually among 13–24-year-old American men who have sex with men. Experts attribute this to "AIDS fatigue" among younger people who have no memory of the worst phase of the epidemic in the 1980s and early 1990s, as well as "condom fatigue" among those who have grown tired of and disillusioned with the unrelenting safer sex message. The increase may also be because of new treatments. In developing countries, HIV infection rates have been characterized as skyrocketing among MSM. Studies have found that less than 5% of MSM in Africa, Asia, and Latin America have access to HIV-related health care.

===== HIV prevention with PrEP =====
Pre-exposure prophylaxis (PrEP) is the use of medication to prevent HIV transmission in people who have not yet been exposed to the virus. When used as directed, PrEP has been shown to be highly effective, reducing the risk of contracting HIV up to 99%. As of 2018, numerous countries have approved the use of PrEP for HIV/AIDS prevention, including the United States, South Korea, France, Norway, Australia, Israel, Canada, Kenya, South Africa, Peru, Thailand, the European Union and Taiwan. New Zealand was one of the first countries in the world to publicly fund PrEP for the prevention of HIV in March 2018.

==== Other sexually transmitted infections ====
Men who have sex with men are at a higher risk of acquiring hepatitis A and hepatitis B through unprotected sexual contact. The U.S. CDC and ACIP recommend hepatitis A and hepatitis B vaccination for men who have sex with men. About a third of the world's population, more than 2 billion people, have been infected with hepatitis B virus (HBV). Hepatitis B is a disease caused by HBV which infects the liver and causes an inflammation called hepatitis.

Syphilis (caused by infection with Treponema pallidum) is passed from person to person through direct contact with a syphilis sore; these occur mainly on the external genitals, or in the vagina, anus, or rectum. Sores also can occur on the lips and in the mouth. Transmission of the organism occurs during vaginal, anal, or oral sex. In 2006, 64% of the reported cases in the United States were among men who have sex with men. This is consistent with a rise in the incidence of syphilis among MSM in other developed nations, attributed by Australian and UK authors to increased rates of unprotected sex among MSM.

Genital human papillomavirus (HPV) is a common virus that most sexually active people in the U.S. will have at some time in their lives. It is passed on through genital contact and is also found on areas that condoms do not cover. Most men who get HPV of any type never develop any symptoms or health problems. Some types of HPV can cause genital warts, penile cancer, or anal cancer. MSM and men with compromised immune systems are more likely than other men to develop anal cancer. The incidence of anal cancer among HIV‐positive MSM is nine times higher than among HIV‐negative MSM, even in antiretroviral therapy. HIV-negative MSM has a higher incidence than the general population. Men with HIV are also more likely to get severe cases of genital warts that are hard to treat.

Though not commonly classified as an STI, giardiasis can be transmitted between gay men, and it can be responsible for severe weight loss and death for individuals who have compromised immune systems, especially HIV.

=== Mental health ===
According to the U.S. Centers for Disease Control, the majority of gay and bisexual men have and maintain good mental health, though research has shown that they are at greater risk for mental health problems. Stigma and homophobia can have negative consequences on health. Compared to other men, gay and bisexual men have a higher chance of having depression and anxiety disorders.

=== Mpox ===
In the United States, Mpox has been shown to disproportionately affect men who have sex with men.

== Prevalence ==
A 2024 meta-analysis in the United States of population surveys found that 3.3% of men reported having sex with another man during the past year, 4.7% in the previous 5 years, and 6.2% in their lifetime.

== MSM blood and tissue donor controversy ==
Many countries impose restrictions on donating blood for men who have or have had sex with men, as well as their female sexual partners. Similar restrictions in many countries also prohibit donation of tissues such as corneas by men who have sex with men, often with far longer deferral periods than for MSM blood donors. Most national standards require direct questioning regarding a donor's sexual history, but the length of deferral varies.

Blood donation policies for men who have sex with men Men who have sex with men may donate blood without a deferral Men who have sex with men may not donate blood within the deferral period Men who have sex with men may not donate blood; permanent deferral Unknown

Blood donation policies for female sex partners of men who have sex with men Female sex partners of men who have sex with men may donate blood without a deferral Female sex partners of men who have sex with men may not donate blood within the deferral period Female sex partners of men who have sex with men may not donate blood; permanent deferral Unknown

== See also ==
- Prison sexuality
- Same gender loving
- Not Gay
- Sexual diversity
- Terminology of homosexuality
- Women who have sex with women
