= Die Katakombe =

Political-literary cabaret in Berlin from 1925 to 1935

Die Katakombe (literally: The Catacombs) was a political-literary cabaret in Berlin from 1929 to 1935. It was founded by Werner Finck, Hans Deppe, R.A. Stemmle and others in the basement of the Association of Berlin Artists at Bellevuestraße 3. Among the artists who performed in the venue were Rudolf Platte, Theo Lingen, Ursula Herking, Isa Vermehren, Ernst Busch, Hanns Eisler, Erich Kästner, Ivo Veit, Julia Marcus (dancer) and Erik Ode.

Finck was the conférencier (master of ceremonies) for a program of sketches and parodies. Within a year differences over the cabaret's artistic direction led to the departure of such politically motivated artists as Busch and Eisler. The location of the cabaret also changed.

After the Nazi seizure of power on 30 January 1933, Secret Police were ever-present in the audience. Although the cabaret was by then entirely non-political, the venue continued to be suspect:

B.- Nr.41551/35 II 2 C 8057/ 35, 16 April 1935: The audience in the Katakombe continues in the vast majority made up of Jews, who pay tribute to the meanness and the vicious, destructive criticism of compères Werner Fink [sic] with fanatic applause. Fink is the typical former cultural Bolshevik, who apparently has not understood understand the new time or chooses not to understand it and attempts, like earlier Jewish writers, to throw into the dirt the ideas of Nazism and all that is sacred to the Nazis.

Die Katakombe was shut 10 May 1935 at the instigation of Joseph Goebbels. Finck was briefly detained in the Esterwegen concentration camp.

== Recordings ==
- Werner Finck: Aufgehobene Rechte. Kabarett aus der Katakombe; CD; ISBN 3-491-91114-1
