= Mental health during the COVID-19 pandemic =

Psychological aspect of viral outbreak

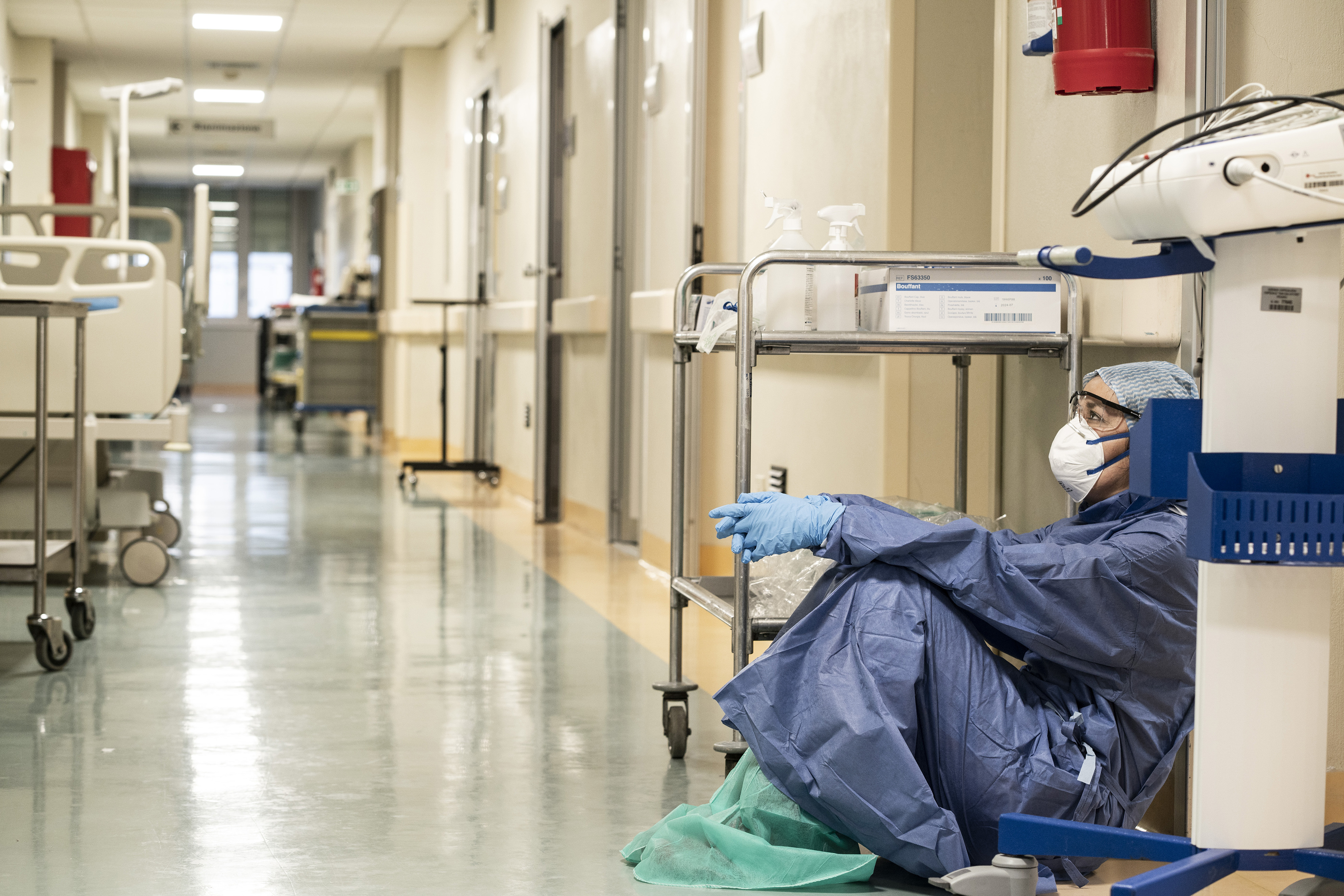
An exhausted anesthesiologist physician in Pesaro, Italy, March 2020

The COVID-19 pandemic has affected people's mental health all over the world. The pandemic has led to widespread feelings of anxiety, depression, and post-traumatic stress disorder symptoms. According to the UN health agency WHO, in the first year of the COVID-19 pandemic, prevalence of common mental health conditions, such as depression and anxiety, went up by more than 25 percent.

The pandemic has damaged social relationships, trust in institutions and in other people, has caused changes in work and income, and has imposed a substantial burden of anxiety and worry on the population. Women and young people face the greatest risk of depression and anxiety.

According to The Centers for Disease Control and Prevention study of Mental Health, Substance Use, and Suicidal Ideation During the COVID-19 Pandemic, "63 percent of young people reported experiencing substantial symptoms of anxiety and depression."

COVID-19 triggered issues caused by substance use disorders (SUDs). The pandemic disproportionately affects people with SUDs. The health consequences of SUDs (for example, cardiovascular diseases, respiratory diseases, type 2 diabetes, immunosuppression and central nervous system depression, and psychiatric disorders), and the associated environmental challenges (such as housing instability, unemployment, and criminal justice involvement), are associated with an increased risk for contracting COVID-19.

Confinement rules, along with unemployment and austerity measures implemented during and after the pandemic period, can significantly affect the illicit drug market and alter patterns of drug use among consumers.

Mitigation measures (i.e. physical distancing, quarantine, and isolation) can worsen loneliness, mental health symptoms, withdrawal symptoms, and psychological trauma.

== Chronology of events ==
December 2019: Wuhan, China, reports the first instances of pneumonia with an unclear cause. People get anxious and afraid as a result of their initial lack of knowledge about the infection.

On January 30, 2020, the COVID-19 pandemic is deemed a Public Health Emergency of International Concern by the World Health Organization (WHO). The public and healthcare professionals experience higher levels of anxiety as a result of increased worldwide knowledge. The WHO formally designates COVID-19 a pandemic on March 11, 2020. Reports of anxiety and sadness rise as a result of widespread panic and terror.

March 2020: Lockdowns and social distancing measures are implemented in several nations. Social isolation aggravates pre-existing mental health issues and adds to feelings of loneliness.

April 2020: Research indicates a sharp increase in mental health problems, including a considerable rise in feelings of anxiety and sadness on a global scale. As more individuals look for help, the need for mental health services rises.

According to the CDC, 40% of American people suffer from substance abuse or mental health problems as of May 2020.

June 2020: As the epidemic strikes, racial injustice demonstrations take place in several areas. For many people, the combined pressures of societal upheaval and COVID-19 intensify trauma and anxiety.

November 2020: According to preliminary statistics, PTSD, anxiety, and depression are more common among healthcare professionals. More support services are advocated for when the mental health costs of frontline workers are acknowledged.

Global vaccination efforts start in January 2021. Although vaccination campaigns offer optimism, some people experience vaccine reluctance and related stress as a result.

June 2021: Many people are experiencing "post-pandemic" stress, according to reports, and mental health problems continue even after lockdowns end. Long-term mental health care and rehabilitation techniques become the main focus.

2022 and Beyond: Research into the pandemic's long-term psychological impacts, such as "long COVID" and its affects on mental health, is still ongoing. Constant research emphasizes the necessity of long-term mental health care and prevention strategies.

== Predictors and potential causes of mental health symptoms ==
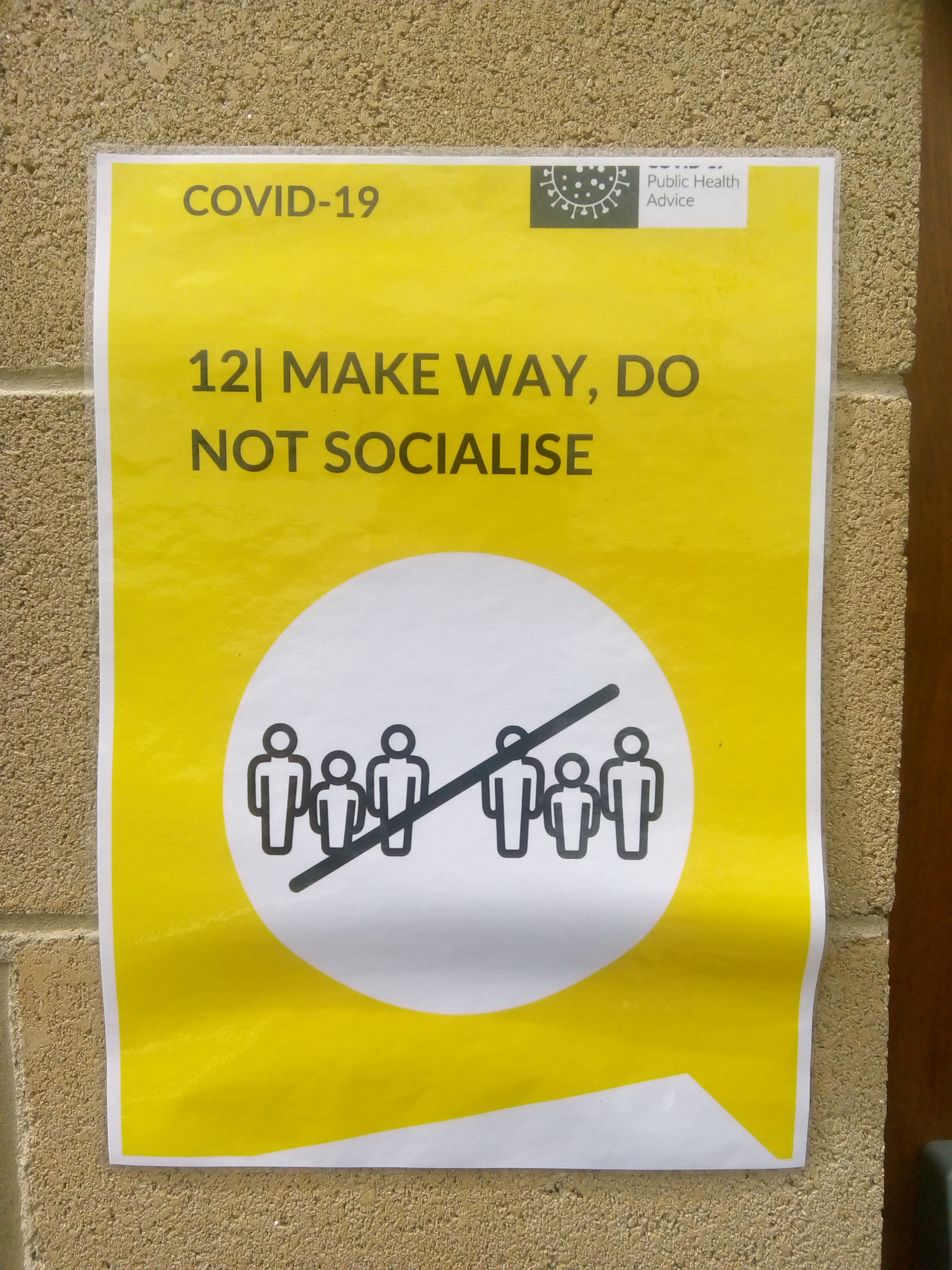
Sign in a gym in Ireland discouraging casual social contact due to the risk of infection. Loss of these kind of interactions has had an impact on many people during the pandemic.

The known causes of mental health issues during the pandemic included fear of infection, stigma associated with infection, isolation (imposed by individuals sheltering on their own or in compliance with lockdowns), and masks. Billions of people shifted to remote work, temporary unemployment, homeschooling or distance education, and lack of physical contact with family members, friends and colleagues.

Some socio-demographic characteristics were also identified as risk factors such as age, female sex, lower educational attainment, lower income, or pre-existing mental health conditions, pre-existing other chronic diseases (comorbidities) and living alone or with children.

=== Unknowns ===
As the pandemic began, the risks were uncertain. As sick people flooded into hospitals and official advice evolved, the lack of information increased stress and anxiety. Many uncertainties surrounded the beginning of the pandemic, including estimating infection risk, symptom overlap between COVID-19 and other health problems. COVID-19 also caused many mental health problems. Patients experienced unfavorable psychological effects such as post-traumatic stress symptoms, disorientation, and rage when exposed to COVID-19.

=== Lack of preparation ===
During the first wave of the epidemic, critical supplies were quickly exhausted. The most prominent items were personal protective equipment (PPE) for hospital workers and ventilators for treatment. At the onset of the pandemic in early 2020, a national survey found that many medical facilities were running out of PPE supplies, including one third of the surveyed medical facilities reporting being out of face masks and a quarter reporting a shortage or almost shortage of gowns. Another study reported that 63.3% of nurses agreed with the statement, "I am worried about inadequate personal protective equipment for healthcare personnel (PPE)".

=== Stigma ===
As the pandemic began, anyone who interacted with infected people had to address the possibility that they might have been infected themselves and might therefore present an unknown risk to their family and others. In some cases, they were initially stigmatized.

=== Isolation ===
Many care homes subjected their residents to enforced isolation. They were locked into their rooms around the clock, including at mealtimes when their meals were delivered to their doors. Visitors were not allowed, nor was any socialization among the residents.

=== Powerlessness ===
Nurses worked longer hours during the pandemic, which increased anxiety in many. Many patients rapidly progressed once in the hospital to the ICU and ultimately, death. The absence of approved therapeutics meant that palliative care (supplemental oxygen, ventilators and extracorporeal membrane oxygenation) were the only options. In some cases, this stimulated frustration and a sense of powerlessness.

=== Disruption ===
Those caring for COVID-19 patients were subject strict biosecurity measures, consigned to wearing gowns, uncomfortable masks and face shields at work. After returning home, many changed clothes before entering and isolated themselves, in an attempt to protect their families. Their jobs demanded constant awareness and vigilance, reduced their autonomy, reduced access to social support, reduced self-care, uncertainty about the effects of long-term exposure to COVID-19 patients, and fear of infecting others.

=== Cognitive symptoms and "brain fog" ===
Beyond mood disorders, the pandemic was associated with measurable impacts on cognitive function, commonly referred to as "brain fog." A major community-based study published in The New England Journal of Medicine in 2024 evaluating over 112,000 participants found that individuals who had recovered from COVID-19 showed persistent, small-to-moderate deficits in cognitive performance—particularly in memory, reasoning, and executive function—compared to uninfected controls. Cognitive deficits were most pronounced in individuals who had experienced severe initial illness, required hospitalization, or developed persistent Long COVID symptoms, though mild deficits were also observed following mild, resolved infections.

In some jurisdictions, schools were closed during the early months of the pandemic. Such closures increased anxiety, loneliness, stress, sadness, frustration, indiscipline, and hyperactivity among children.

== Prevention and management ==
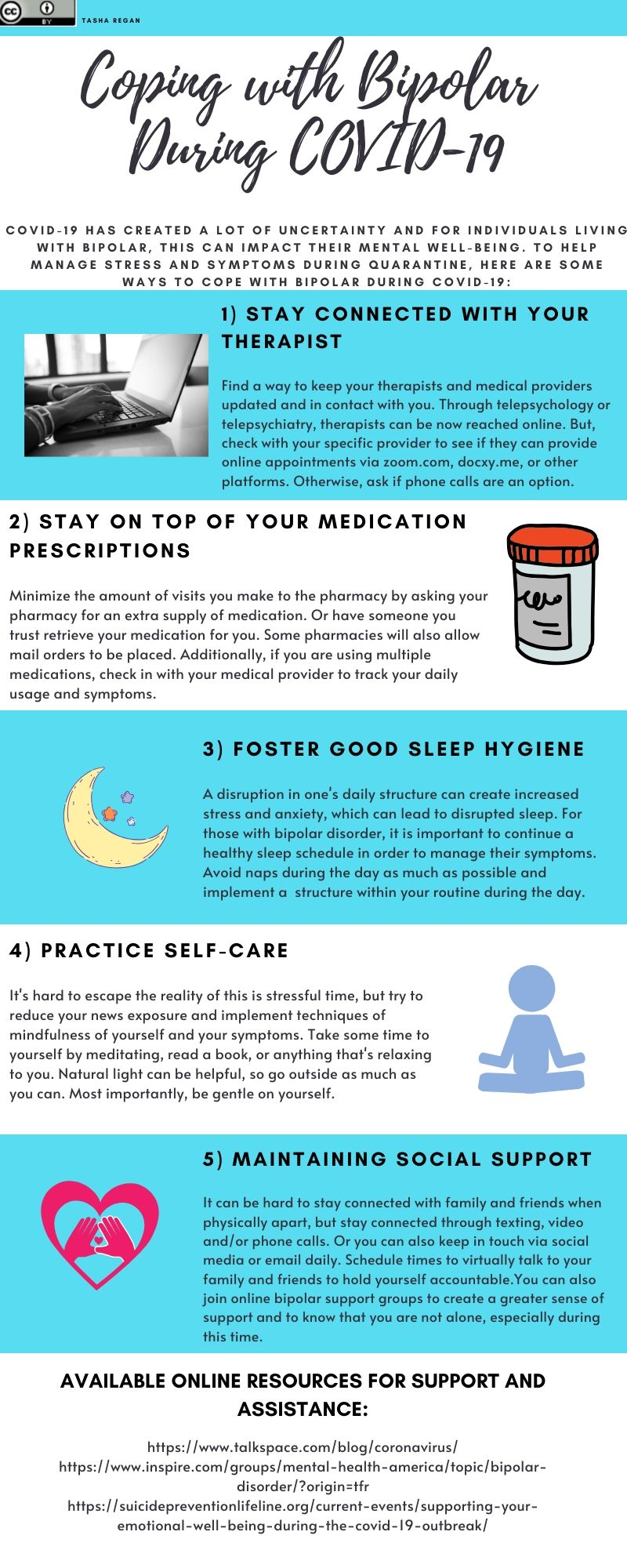
Coping with bipolar disorder and other mental health issues during COVID-19 infographic

The Guidelines on Mental Health and Psychosocial Support of the Inter-Agency Standing Committee of the United Nations recommends that mental health support during an emergency "do no harm, promote human rights and equality, use participatory approaches, build on existing resources and capacities, adopt multi-layered interventions and work with integrated support systems."

One author suggested implementing habits that act as "psychological PPE". These habits include healthy eating, healthy coping mechanisms, and practicing mindfulness and relaxation methods.

Another method that many companies followed for their employees was to provide the employees with specific mental health improvement programs in order to increase the morale of the employees and improve their mental health.

=== World Health Organization and Centers for Disease Control guidelines ===
WHO and CDC issued guidelines for minimizing mental health issues during the pandemic. The summarized guidelines are:

==== For general population ====
- Be empathetic to affected individuals.
- Use people-first language while describing infected individuals. (for example, instead of saying "a schizophrenic person, say "a person with schizophrenia").
- Minimize watching the news to reduce anxiety. Seek information only from trusted sources, preferably once or twice a day.
- Protect yourself and be supportive to others.
- Amplify positive stories of local infected people.
- Honor healthcare workers who are caring for those with COVID-19.
- Implement positive thinking.
- Engage in hobbies.
- Avoid negative coping strategies, such as avoidance of crowds and pandemic news coverage.

==== For healthcare workers ====
What are health care workers experiencing?

- Feeling pressure is normal in a crisis. Mental health is as important as physical health.
- Nurses face higher rates of fatigue, sleep problems, depressive disorders, PTSD, and anxiety.
- Personal Protective Equipment shortages leaving nurses feeling unsafe.
- Frontline health care works experience higher levels of stress
- Nurses expressed elevated stress. Hands-on patient care increased risk perception. Vaccinated nurses were less fatigued than others. Nurses working with infected patients faced more anxiety, depression, and distress. Non-frontline nurses exhibited less depression.

What actions can healthcare workers take?

- Adopt coping strategies, get sufficient rest, eat healthy food, be physically active, and avoid tobacco, alcohol, and drugs.
- Stay connected with loved ones, including digitally.
- Use understandable ways to share messages with people with disabilities.
- Know how to link people with available resources.
- Online counseling can reduce the risk of insomnia, anxiety, and depression/burnout.

==== For team leaders in health facilities ====
- Focus on long-term occupational capacity rather than short term results.
- Ensure good quality communication and accurate updates.
- Ensure that staff are aware of mental health resources.
- Orient staff on how to provide psychological first aid to the affected.
- Ensure that mental health emergencies are managed in healthcare facilities.
- Ensure availability of essential psychiatric medications at all levels of health care.
- Offset feelings of anxiety and depression using strong leadership and clear, honest, and open communication.
- Use widespread screening to identify workers in need of mental health support.
- Provide organizational support
- Facilitate peer support.
- Rotate work schedules to mitigate stress.
- Implement interventions tailored to local needs and provide positive, supportive environments.

==== For child caregivers ====
- Role model healthy behaviors, routines, and coping skills.
- Use a positive parenting approach based on communication and respect.
- Maintain family routines and provide age-appropriate activities to teach children responsibility.
- Explain COVID-19 and required interventions in age-appropriate ways.
- Monitor children's social media.
- Validate children's thoughts and feelings and help them find positive ways to express emotions.
- Avoid separating children from their parents/caregivers as much as possible. Ensure regular contact with parents and caregivers, for children in isolation.

==== For older adults, people with underlying health conditions, and their caregivers ====
- Older adults, those especially in isolation or suffering from pre-existing conditions, may become more anxious, angry, or withdrawn. Provide practical and emotional support through caregivers and healthcare professionals.
- Share facts on the crisis and give clear information about how to reduce infection risk.
- Maintain access to current medications.
- Find out in advance where and how to get practical help.
- Learn and perform daily home exercises.
- Keep regular schedules.
- Keep in touch with loved ones.
- Continue hobbies or regular tasks.
- Talk on the phone or online or do a fun online activity with others.
- Help your community, e.g., by providing food/meals to others.

==== For people in isolation ====
- Stay connected and maintain social networks.
- Pay attention to your needs and feelings. Engage in relaxing activities.
- Avoid listening to rumors.
- Begin new activities.
- Maintain routines.

CDC stated that citizens should "try to do enjoyable activities and return to normal life as much as possible" during a crisis. A peer-reviewed study published in 2021 suggests that playing video games may have a positive effect on players' mental health and well-being, providing opportunities for socialization and connection. However, across 22 studies (n = 19,752), time spent playing video games during the pandemic showed no overall association with mental-health outcomes (r = −0.03, 95% CI −0.08 to 0.02).

== Impacts on specific disorders ==
=== Individuals with mental health disorders ===
Due to a lack of pre-COVID comparative data and non-representative sampling, few researchers were able to clearly identify changes in mental health caused by the COVID-19 environment. However, a study in Belgium compared the registration of mental health problems in primary care during and before the pandemic. They found a relative increase in registered mental health problems during the pandemic, as well as relatively more care provided to patients with mental health problems.

Young people, people with pre-existing mental health disorders, and people who are financially disadvantaged have been found to face an increase in declining mental health. Some demographics appear to have been under researched (e.g., culturally and linguistically diverse populations and indigenous peoples), while some research methodologies have not been utilized (e.g. there was a lack of qualitative and mixed-methods studies).

COVID-19 also impacted the availability of therapy and mental health services to those who were already receiving treatment. A cross-sectional online survey found that 42% of children lost access to all therapy services during the pandemic, and 34% were able to receive at least on therapy service via telehealth. Over 40% of parents expressed regressions in their children's motor, behavior, social, and communication skills which they attributed to the changes in therapy services.

=== Obsessive–compulsive disorder ===
Obsessive-compulsive disorder (OCD) is a psychiatric disorder that is extremely common in developing and developed countries alike. The social and collective perception of OCD as an illness albeit, is subjective and varies cross-culturally. As such, data relating to the impact of the COVID-19 pandemic upon sufferers of OCD is skewed because of different cultural influences on behavior and 'relationships between beliefs'. Those living with OCD have been subject to socioeconomic, pandemic-related stressors, as COVID-19 has been covered across social media and the 24/7 news cycle since its outbreak. These media outlets emanate fear, and the probability of contamination in conjunction with regulatory quarantines and periods of isolation, trigger precautionary compulsions in OCD patients. Such behavior is driven by the 'psychological distress' of governmental control and social restrictions.

=== Post-traumatic stress disorder ===
Emotions of high stress and loneliness are contributing factors of post-traumatic stress disorder (PTSD) and the COVID-19 pandemic has provided individuals with conditions in which these symptoms foster. COVID-19 has affected social structures across cultures, and for people living with PTSD, global measures that regulate the body by means of school closures, border restrictions, social distancing, mask wearing and hand washing, expose the 'population to feelings of intense fear and helplessness'. A study on the psychological distress experienced by health care workers across 21 countries reveals a PTSD prevalence of 21.5%. The Middle East and Europe were both countries of interest in this study, indicating the cross-cultural impact that COVID-19 has had upon PTSD.

==== PTSD in Children ====
Studies from previous years and epidemics reported that children who were isolated were much more likely to develop PTSD. PTSD in children can have long-term consequences on brain development and affected kids are more likely to develop psychiatric disorders.

=== Autism spectrum disorder ===
Pandemic lockdowns impacted mental health outcomes for children with neurodevelopmental disorders, such as ASD, creating challenges including the lack of understanding about the pandemic and the ability to complete school work. Children on the autism spectrum were more likely to become agitated by the changing environment. An increase in stimming, self-injury, nervousness and impulsiveness were observed to have increased in children with autism during the pandemic.

=== Attention deficit/hyperactivity disorder ===
Adolescents and children with attention deficit hyperactivity disorder (ADHD) struggled with staying confined in only one space, creating difficulties for caregivers to find activities that were engaging/meaningful to them.

The impact of COVID-19 restrictions and isolation impacted on children's abilities to use successful coping mechanisms and management techniques for ADHD. Issues of diagnosis and treatment were also prevalent. Primarily, clinicians faced the problem of differentiating between situational and persistent ADHD symptoms in children and adolescents, who did not have the same environmental triggers (i.e. social spheres) which allowed their symptoms to be best evaluated. Those wanting to be evaluated for expression of ADHD symptoms were subject to extensive wait lists for clinical analysis as a result of staff shortages during the pandemic. Those that were offered a positive diagnosis were then further restricted by the limited non-medication based treatment options, such as behavioural and educational therapies. Those children and adolescents already living with diagnosed ADHD were also facing substantial challenges. Studies conducted during the pandemic showed that social isolation and homestay directives led to an increased reliance on screen-time to manage attention problems. A 75% increase in online gaming participation was observed. In some instances, gaming may represent an unhealthy coping mechanism for ADHD youth and has already been demonstrated to exacerbate poor management of symptoms. Furthermore, this excessive screen-time was prolonged by the use of Zoom for learning. Children with ADHD were required to simultaneously process auditory and visual cues during these online classes, leading to 'distracted connection' and mental overstimulation.

=== Anxiety and depression ===
An increase of mental health issues such as depression and anxiety during the COVID-19 pandemic is a commonly held perception worldwide. Studies indicate that globally, approximately one-third of adults experienced anxiety symptoms during the pandemic, with similar prevalence across high-, middle-, and low-income countries. Some studies have also examined mental health symptoms among patients infected with COVID-19. Mental health symptoms in hospitalized patients may be underdiagnosed because clinicians often prioritize physical illness during treatment. Depression and anxiety in infected patients have also been associated with poorer health outcomes, including longer hospital stays and increased likelihood of readmission.

While studies have documented changes in mental health during the pandemic, studies have also found that some people experienced more anxiety than other. A systematic review and meta-analysis comparing mental health symptoms before and during the pandemic found that changes in anxiety and depression symptoms are not uniform across populations, as some groups experienced more symptoms than others.

For example, a study in China found that people in historically rice-farming areas of southern China reported more anxiety during the pandemic than people in wheat-farming areas of northern China. This is despite the fact that rice-farming areas experienced fewer COVID-19 cases than wheat-farming areas. The higher levels of anxiety could be due to cultural differences between regions, such as the tighter social norms of cultures with a history of rice farming. Rice farming required more coordination than crops like wheat, and rice-farming cultures score higher on measures of collectivism, which research has linked to anxiety.

In the US, a study concluded that levels of perceived anxiety and depression had increased for pregnant African American women during the pandemic. They also concluded that pregnant African American women experienced higher levels of loneliness that increased their levels of perceived anxiety, stress, and depression. The higher levels of anxiety and depression may be related to a history of underlying social inequity and oppression, influencing rates of mortality and morbidity rate, job loss, and food and housing insecurities.

=== Behavioral Addictions ===
The COVID-19 pandemic affected patterns of behavioral addictions, including gambling, compulsive sexual behaviors, and pornography use. Social isolation from lockdowns increased stress from common coping activities that would take place in the form of socializing, which likely increased vulnerability to addictive behaviors. Studies reported increased online gambling activity, particularly among those with prior gambling issues. Pandemic restrictions affected access to treatment access to addictive disorders, as group therapy and support groups changed to online formats, affecting those with mental health issues. In these difficult times, many individuals resorted to the dopamine release of pornography use, as the emotions and stress of the circumstances and lack of socializing left people with more temptation.

== Impact on children ==
Children and families also had psychological effects due to the COVID-19 pandemic. A study looking at children between the ages of 5-11 and their caregivers in the UK found that more than 30% of caregivers reported changes in their children's behavioral and emotional states. 61.4% stated their children had an increase in frustration and some of the other symptoms reported were irritability, restlessness, anger, anxiety, sadness, worry and being more likely to argue with the rest of the family. During the pandemic there was a significant increase in the amount of time children spent on screens, and less on physical activity and sleeping. More than half of the caregiver's reported their psychological distress levels increased during the lockdown, which was significantly related to child symptoms. Fear was also very common amongst youth, particularly fear for infection or concern for family members and as mentioned above, this led to an increase of the levels of anxiety and depression.

While pandemic-related anxiety negatively affected family well-being, research also examined its motivating role in protective behaviors. A 2025 longitudinal surveillance study of 1,913 U.S. households with children found that higher levels of caregiver worry regarding COVID-19 predicted greater observance of social distancing measures and lower chances of confirmed household SARS-CoV-2 infection during the first year of the pandemic.

On October 19, 2021, the American Academy of Pediatrics, the American Academy of Child and Adolescent Psychiatry, and the Children's Hospital Association declared a "national emergency" for children's mental health.

One study reported that many children who were separated from caregivers during the pandemic experienced a crisis. Children who were isolated or quarantined during past pandemics were more likely to develop acute stress disorders, adjustment disorders and experience grief, with 30% of children meeting the clinical criteria for PTSD. A meta-analysis of 15 studies performed reported that 79.4% of children and teenagers suffered negative consequences: 42.3% were irritable, 41.7% had symptoms of depression, 34.5% struggled with anxiety, and 30.8% had problems with inattention. Many young people struggled with boredom, fear, and sleep problems.

A collection of 29 studies posted in August 2021 by Jamanetwork showed that the prevalence of symptoms of depression and anxiety had doubled during COVID-19. They had also found that older adolescents were affected more and it was the most prevalent in girls.

In an October 2020 global study, negative emotions experienced by students included boredom (45.2%), anxiety (39.8%), frustration (39.1%), anger (25.9%), hopelessness (18.8%), and shame (10.0%). The highest levels of anxiety were found in South America (65.7%) and Oceania (64.4%), followed by North America (55.8%) and Europe (48.7%). The least anxious were students from Africa (38.1%) and Asia (32.7%). A similar order of continents was found for frustration.

School closures caused anxiety for students with special needs as daily routines are disrupted and therapy and social skill groups halted. Others who incorporated school routines into their coping mechanisms experienced an increase in depression and difficulty in readjusting to normal routines. Closures limited mental health service availability, along with educators' ability to identify at-risk youth. While children with neurodevelopmental conditions were not universally worse off, there was high variability: some students experienced worse mental health outcomes due to the change in lifestyle, but also some students experienced better mental health outcomes, due to less stresses from being at home.

=== LGBTQ Youth ===
A National survey that focuses on LGBTQ youth mental health was conducted by The Trevor Project in 2021. This survey highlights some of the specific challenges faced by LGBTQ youth during the Coronavirus pandemic in 2020, like increased restraints on expressing their gender expression and sexuality. The data collected was from about 35,000 LGBTQ people aged 13–24 years old. 45% of youths surveyed were people of color and 38% were transgender or nonbinary. Overall, 70% of LGBTQ youth "stated that their mental health was "poor" most of the time or always during COVID-19", as well as 80% of youths aged 13–17, and 81% of youths aged 18–24, said that COVID-19 negatively impacted their mental health. COVID happened so quickly that it was a difficult adjustment for some LGBTQ youth to have to go back to living at their parent's houses full time, especially when some families of LGBTQ kids were not as accepting of them.

Only 1 in 3 LGBTQ youth found their homes to be supportive, and 81% of youths aged 13–17, and 81% of youths aged 18–24, reported that they experienced a more stressful living situation. Many college aged kids came out for the first time while they were at school, so when they had to go back home they had to decide whether or not to tell their parents, who could be potentially unsupportive or even abusive. Younger kids were isolated at home with no access to their friends, guidance counselors, or teachers who were their only potential support systems. 50% of youths aged 13–17, and 42% of youths aged 18–24, said COVID-19 impacted their ability to express their sexual orientation. 65% of youths aged 13–17, and 52% of youths aged 18–24, said that COVID-19 impacted their ability to express their gender identity.

72% of LGBTQ youth reported "symptoms of generalized anxiety disorder" and 62% of LGBTQ youth reported "symptoms of major depressive disorder". In regards to suicide, it was reported that 42% of LGBTQ youth "seriously considered attempting suicide in the past year". 48% of this being youths aged 13–17 and 34% were youths aged 18–24. The percentages of attempted suicides were 31% of Native/Indigenous youth, 21% of Black youth, 21% of multiracial youth, 18% of Latinx youth, 12% of Asian/Pacific Islander youth, and 12% of white youth. Overall, 20% of LGBTQ youths aged 13–17 and 9% of LGBTQ youths aged 18–24 attempted suicide.

Sexual and gender minority young adults were particularly vulnerable to challenges with their mental health during the COVID-19 pandemic. One study of 227 sexual and gender minority individuals had higher levels of COVID-related stress and increased symptoms of depression and anxiety. The researchers also found that when participants had more supportive relationships, they had reduced impacts of pandemic related stress on depressive symptoms.

=== Impact on Students ===
A infographic students can use to stay connected to better their mental health

=== K-12 ===
Schools have been able to play the role of a safety net in many cases where adults look out for the mental health status of their students. In schools teachers and adults are able to be on the look out and recognize physical/emotional distress, signs of physical abuse, and/or sudden significant or subtle changes in behavior. Should they recognize any apparent disruptions, teachers are able to intervene and provide their students with the necessary resources to help them.

However, during the COVID-19 pandemic, with students and teachers out, this system has not been in place. When schools shut down, teachers had to resort to online learning where they were no longer able to see how students were doing physically/mentally and weren't able to provide them with the help they needed. With the lack of resources to help students, it resulted in a drastic increase in depression and anxiety rates, increasing by over 20%. Since students were suffering mentally, it became challenging for them to have the motivation to do their school work.

As COVID-19 mitigation efforts began to ease up and students return to the classroom, teachers have noticed an increase in crying and disruptive behavior in this population of students and also increased occurrences in violence and bullying. Mental health professionals call for schools and education institutions everywhere to implement a number of health promotion programs in their schools that may teach students how to prevent succumbing to adverse mental health issues and how to cope with the reality and continuing effects of COVID-19 so that it does not get in the way of their education and future endeavors.

=== Higher education ===
Studies conducted in the first stages of the pandemic found the age group of the average higher education student (i.e. 18–24-year-olds) among the most affected in terms of mental health.

The Higher Education Policy Institute conducted a study that reported that 63% of students claimed that their mental health had worsened, and that 38% demonstrated satisfaction with the mental health service access. Physical harm such as overdose, suicide and substance abuse reached an all-time high. Academic stress, dissatisfaction with the quality of teaching and fear of infection were associated with higher depression scores.

Involvement in a steady relationship and living with others were associated with lower depressive scores. Research reported that psychological stress following strict confinement was moderated by levels of the pre-pandemic stress hormone cortisol and individual coping skills. Stay-at-home orders that worsened self-reports of stress also increased cognitive abilities including perspective taking and working memory. However, that greater emotion regulation (measured pre-pandemic) was associated with lower acute stress (measured by the Impact of Event Scale-Revised) in response to the early pandemic in the US during lockdown. Students who experienced a death of a close family member, a known stressor, were more likely to decide to stay home and attend college virtually.

Isolation from others and lack of contact with mental health services worsened symptoms. The specific level of impact on students reflected their demographic backgrounds: students from low-income households and students of color experienced greater mental health and academic impacts. Students who struggle with mental health also struggled academically. Students from high-income households and those in successful school districts were more likely to have to mental health (and other) resources.

A study in Belgian higher education students found the following factors to be associated with higher scores of depression during the COVID-19 pandemic: academic stress, dissatisfaction with the quality of teaching, fear of being infected, higher levels of frustration and boredom, inadequate supplies of resources, inadequate information from public health authorities, insufficient financial resources and perceived stigma. These factors were in line with a review that identified a comprehensive set of mental health stressors playing a role in people who were quarantined to limit the transmission of pathogens similar to COVID-19.

Individuals with a known history of psychiatric disorders were more vulnerable to experience heightened levels of distress during lockdown measures. Specifically, researchers saw an increase in the amount of eating disorders related vulnerabilities. Social isolation that accompanies lockdown and stay at home measures for many resulted in a decrease in physical movement and activity, an increased amount of food in the home, and an increased time spent with a screen. There was an increase of 10% of student's perception of their body and the description of their weight as a risk factor for acquiring an eating disorder and exhibiting symptoms during the months between January 2020 and April 2020. After lockdown ended, student's levels of physical activity remained below their pre-pandemic levels, even for those attending colleges that resumed in-person instruction.

Studies showed that although college students did not have significant increases in their BMI, the rates in which college students were concerned about gaining weight and subsequent increases in their BMI significantly increased.

An international survey conducted in Norway, USA, UK, and Australia at the end of 2020 found that university students in higher education had poorer mental health than non-students.

A research study conducted by the Centers for Disease Control and Prevention (CDC) looked into data gathered from a nationwide survey of high school students during the COVID-19 pandemic. The data collected revealed disturbingly high incidences of worsening mental health, with 37.1% of students saying they experienced poor mental health during the pandemic, and 31.1% reporting poor mental health during the first 30 days after the original survey. Also students reported that 12 months before the survey how they were feeling with 44.2% saying they experienced persistent feelings of sadness or hopelessness, while 19.9% had deeply considered attempting suicide, and 9.0% had attempted suicide. Based on the data, the pandemic increased stress, anxiety and depression amongst high school students mainly because of social isolation, online learning difficulties, and familial conflicts.

This study sheds light on the importance of being connected to school, family, and community groups especially during a time of prime development. Students who were able to maintain these aspects of life were found to have lower rates of poor mental health and suicidal thoughts/behaviors.

== Impact on women ==
Studies in China have shown that females have high risk factors of physiological impact including stress, anxiety, depression, and post-traumatic stress that intensify due to the pandemic.

Mothers, who are most commonly in charge of caregiving and childcare reported feeling agitated, scared, depressed, and anxious due to the lack of resources during the COVID-19 pandemic.

Many women lost their jobs or quit their jobs to avoid infecting family members. Through becoming unemployed, women faced an increase in caregiving roles at home. Women also dealt with grief of losing loved ones to the pandemic which took a toll on their mental health.

A 2020 Kaiser Family Foundation survey found that 57% of women reported mental health issues due to the stress the pandemic caused them.

Studies show that women are highly susceptible to physical violence and suffer from economic inequality during the pandemic.

Single women have less support and more roles to take on so the pandemic promoted more stress and less time to work on their mental health.

The unknown effects of SARS-CoV-2 on the developing fetus, limited treatment options, and reduced available resources leave many women facing the difficult decision of whether to try to conceive or delay pregnancy. For example, in one study, 37.3% of survey participants who wanted children before the COVID-19 pandemic no longer wanted children.

=== Pregnant women ===
During pregnancy, women often experience heightened symptoms of depression and anxiety. The COVID-19 pandemic caused an increase in stress and anxiety for nearly everyone worldwide, but more vulnerable groups such as pregnant women, were especially at risk of suffering the psychological effects. The pandemic resulted in heightened mental health issues for vulnerable groups, such as pregnant and postpartum women, because of the 'physiological and psychological changes' the body undergoes during the stages of pregnancy. Women who were already experiencing an increase in stress, depression, and anxiety due to the changes in hormones that occur during pregnancy, suffered an increase in symptoms associated with mental health issues as the pandemic progressed.

COVID-19 increases fear and worries of vulnerability due to the unclear understanding of how COVID-19 impacts pregnancy. A 2020 study in China of 4,124 pregnant women found that after they learned that COVID-19 could be spread from human to human their scores on the Edinburgh Postnatal Depression Scale were much higher. They showed increased anxiety levels, depression levels, and suicidal thoughts.

A 2020 study in Canada of 1,987 pregnant women showed results that 37% of the women showed depression symptoms, 46.3% showed high anxiety levels, and 67.6% showed an increase in pregnancy-correlated anxiety.

Pregnant women that tested positive for COVID-19 faced complications including preterm birth, premature rupture of membranes, fetal distress, stillbirth, and placental infections.

More than one third of Beck Anxiety Inventory (BAI) and Beck Depression Inventory (BDI) scores in pregnant women were above normal during the pandemic in a study conducted by Durankus.

The possible threats that COVID-19 put on the mother and child's life and how it could possibly impact proper prenatal care correlated to higher levels of stress, depression and anxiety. Anxiety in pregnant women increased as they thought about the possibility of being infected, changing birth plans, running out of food or essentials, and the uncertainty of how Covid would impact their labor process.

=== Latina immigrant women ===
A 2018-2020 study found that Latina immigrants declared facing discrimination and stigma from others who believed that they had the COVID-19 disease. This kind of treatment impacted or even worsened their mental health. Latina immigrants were given an increase in caregiving roles with little support from others during the pandemic which played a role in their poor mental health and wellbeing.

Studies have shown higher levels of depression and anxiety in Latina immigrants compared to before the pandemic. Latina immigrants already dealt with economic stress before the pandemic but COVID-19 escalated their stress through isolation, fear, lack of support, services and resources.

=== Spanish women ===
A 2020 study of Barcelona women compared their anxiety and depression levels during the initial days of lockdown and then 5 weeks after lockdown during the COVID-19 pandemic. Results showed that their anxiety levels went from 8.5% to 17.6% and their depression levels went from 7.7% to 22.5%.

Their results showed a correlation of higher risks of anxiety and depression with women who have unstable personalities and women who can't easily control negative emotions. The pandemic increased stress which impacted those vulnerable to handling stressful situations.

Women who dealt with economic issues, and unemployment during the pandemic showed poor mental health but women with the neuroticism trait were most vulnerable to mental health issues during pandemic.

=== Turkish women ===
A survey conducted in Turkey in 2020 concluded that younger women and women who are in school showed higher mental burnout. The shift from in-person learning to online learning negatively affected women's mental health.

Women had to balance school, work, and caregiving during the pandemic which caused them to burn out and experience increased stress. They also worried about testing positive and possibly spreading the disease since they were working and coming home during the pandemic.

Staying at home while being restricted from socializing created a negative impact on women's mental wellbeing; they become exhausted, lonely, stressed, and worried.

== Impact on Asian Americans ==
Hate crimes targeted towards Asians rose nearly 150% across major U.S. cities from 2019 to 2020. As the pandemic progressed, about 40% of Asian and Black Americans reported that people felt uncomfortable around them. The harassment against those of Asian descent ranges in its forms; these include both verbal and physical attacks, and even acts of vandalism. Some attest the increase in attack rates to the negative expressions used by President Donald Trump, an example of this being when he referred to the COVID-19 virus as "kung flu." Studies found that for Asian Americans, the racism they experienced due to COVID-19 was strongly linked to issues such as anxiety, depression, stress, and lower self-esteem. Asian American youth were especially vulnerable, experiencing things like being blamed for the virus, anti-Asian slurs, and increased harassment, bullying, and social exclusion.

Asian Americans disproportionately hold positions as high-risk essential workers, and many regions heavily affected by COVID-19 have an abundance of Asian-owned businesses. Suggestions for aiding in the support of Asian Americans throughout this time include ensuring Asian inclusion in businesses, preventing the use of Anti-Asian rhetoric, and encouraging a dialogue that accounts for the acknowledgement of Asian American treatment and support throughout this time.

== Impact on African Americans ==
African Americans have been diagnosed with COVID-19 and died at a disproportionately higher rate. Many factors contributed to this outcome. African Americans disproportionately represent service industry workers. These essential workers have a higher risk of exposure to COVID-19 due to the inability to shelter at home.

The contributing factors to this disparity are the limited public testing available, an increase in low-wage worker unemployment, lack of healthcare, medical racism/biases, and a higher rate of pre-existing conditions. Due to these disparities, the Black-White life expectancy gap is expected to increase by 40%, from 3.6 years to over five years.

Structural health inequalities have intensified the effect of COVID-19 on African Americans. African Americans are less likely to have adequate access to consistent healthcare, residential segregation and food insecurity lead to underlying health conditions, and underrepresentation in government and medicine leads to biased decision-making and policies that don't fully address the needs of Black communities. A meta analysis found that African Americans were found to have higher risk and severity of COVID-19, as well as the social determinants of health being strongly correlated with COVID-19 outcomes.

== Impact on essential workers ==
Key workers did not shift to remote work despite low availability of PPE and while risks from the virus were undetermined. These workers earn modest wages on average and are more likely to be racial/ethnic minorities.

=== Low income workers ===
Fewer than 5% of US workers without a high school diploma were remote workers during the COVID-19 pandemic. Only 7% of US service workers, the majority of whom were low-wage customer-facing workers, could use remote work. Service industry workers were the least likely to get compensated for time off. The pandemic's nationwide economic implications resulted in business closures and record unemployment rates. Low-wage and part-time workers were those most likely to be unemployed and people of color (especially women) had disproportionate job losses compared to the general population.

Frontline workers during the Pandemic were experiencing an increase in workload which made them more likely to suffer from stress, depression and PTSD.

=== Healthcare workers ===
Before COVID-19, healthcare workers already faced many stressors, including health risks, the possibility of infecting their household, and the stress of working with extremely sick patients. COVID-19's physical and emotional burden impacted healthcare workers increased rates of anxiety, depression, and burnout that impacted sleep, quality work/empathy towards patients, and suicide rates.

Cases of anxiety and depression within healthcare workers who interact with COVID-19 patients increased by 1.57% and 1.52% respectively.

One study reported that frontline nurses experience higher rates of anxiety, emotional exhaustion, depression, and post-traumatic stress disorder.

A cross-sectional study using an online survey in Southern California examined stress levels before and during the pandemic. The study used the 10-item Perceived Stress Scale (PSS) and the Connor-Davidson Resilience Scale to assess psychological stress and resilience in nurses. The experiment concluded that nurses reported feeling moderate and high levels of stress compared to before the pandemic.

A five-part questionnaire conducted among healthcare workers in Ghana to examine the correlation between COVID-19 and mental health. The questionnaire classified participant fears as "none", "mild", "moderate", and "extreme". Participants also answered and ranked questions about depression using the Depression Anxiety Stress Scale (DASS). Because the DASS-21 assessment is split up into three categories, (Depression, Anxiety and Stress), participants provided three numbers, one for each category. The fourth part assessed whether participants perceived that they were provided with a good psychological environment. The fifth part assessed coping success. Over 40% of health staff reported mild to extreme fear. Depression ranked highest with 16%. However, only 30% received their salary, and only 40% were insured in case of infection. 42% of respondents in Ghana proved that their hospitals do not provide sufficient protective equipment.

Hospitals in China such as The Second Xiangya Hospital (Psychology Research Center), and the Chinese Medical and Psychological Disease Clinical Medicine Research Center noticed signs of psychological distress and set up a plan to help struggling staff. They suggested coping strategies for stress, a hotline, and education. Healthcare workers stated that all they needed was uninterrupted rest as well as more supplies. Moreover, medical staff in China agreed to use psychologists' skills to help them deal with distressed patients. They suggested having mental health specialists ready when a patient becomes emotionally distressed.

Initially, healthcare workers experienced fear over possible exposure. This fear correlated to significant mental health declines amongst nurses.

Increased patient workloads contributed to mental health impacts. Patient counts in hospitals increased during seasonal waves, sometimes overloading hospitals. A majority of medical professionals experienced higher patient workloads. Limitations on family visitation increased staff demands.

Anxiety in healthcare workers rose. Anxiety directly correlates with worker performance. One study reported that 13% of COVID nurses and 16% of other COVID healthcare workers reported severe anxiety. Another study surveyed workers in March 2020 and again in May and reported that psychological distress and anxiety had increased. Other studies reported that the pandemic had led at least one in five healthcare professionals to report symptoms of anxiety. Specifically, anxiety was assessed in 12 studies, with a pooled prevalence of 23.2%.

One study reported that things changed drastically in a couple of months after the pandemic began. It found that the prevalence rates of post-COVID anxiety were about 32%. Participants with moderate to extremely severe anxiety made up 26% of the sample. Individuals who worked during the pandemic reported higher rates of anxiety. In another study, 42% of patient care respondents had significantly more anxiety than providers who did not care directly for patients.

Increased depression and burnout were observed in healthcare workers. In one study more than 28% of the sample reported high levels of emotional exhaustion. More than 50% of the sample reported low levels of depersonalization, except for COVID nurses and physicians, 37% of whom reported depersonalization. Another study reported that the prevalence rates of depression were as high as 22% and that extremely severe depression occurred in 13%.

In a cross-sectional survey, a high percentage of the nurses surveyed reported high stress levels and/or PTSD symptoms. Eight major themes were identified:

- working in an isolated environment
- PPE shortage and the discomfort of prolonged usage
- sleep problems
- intensity of workload
- cultural and language barriers
- lack of family support
- fear of being infected
- insufficient work experiences with COVID-19

Many of these concerns are related to the pandemic. Healthcare understaffing not only affects patient health but can rebound against healthcare workers. A study found that 70+% of doctors and nurses perceived moderate-to-severe stress. The study reported that direct dealing with COVID-19 patients significantly increases stress. Without intervention the nursing staff and patients would struggle.

=== Mental health professionals ===
The pandemic affected mental healthcare workers by greatly altering how services would be provided to patients. Many mental healthcare workers were forced to adapt to new service models, including widespread use of remote services such as telephone consultations and online meetings. The changes increased the load on these mental healthcare workers, as they were also struggling to meet the increased demand in their roles as mental health issues rose across the globe during the pandemic. The impacts on these workers included insomnia, psychological distress, anxiety, as well as other psychological issues, and caring for patients placed a large burden on them.

== Other mental health consequences ==
=== Relationships ===
The stress of the pandemic was cited as being a major cause in the increased numbers of break-ups and divorces which was observable from mid-2020 onwards as the upheaval of societal norms prompted people to reconsider their lives, relationships and jobs. Relationship experts noted that people often do not recognize the impact that stress can have on a relationship and a couple's ability to be good partners to each other. Some of the causes cited included the stresses brought about by living in cramped and shared spaces, arguments over the division of housework, and differing attitudes towards the seriousness of the virus with some partners choosing not to observe government guidelines over quarantine, mask mandates, or vaccinations. The influence of unemployment and/or wage decreases brought about as a result of the pandemic was also cited, noting that this can manifest as anxiety, anger and frustration as well as an increased likelihood of domestic abuse.

A survey by Relate, a UK relationship-support charity, in April 2020 found that nearly a quarter of people had felt that lockdown had been placing additional pressures on their relationship. In couples where one party chose to get vaccinated while the other did not, tensions arose over the anger felt towards the partner for depriving them of their chance to enjoy life again. As the pandemic took away "well-established routines that offered comfort, stability and rhythm", according to Ronen Stilman, a psychotherapist and spokesperson for the UK Council for Psychotherapy, it left many partners around the world with limited opportunities to "seek other forms of support or stimulation" beyond their relationship, which put them under severe strain. The pandemic was also noted as acting as a catalyst for break-ups that may have been impending already, especially when the previous separate routines of partners had served to mask problems in this regard. As of December 2020 it was noted the number of couples seeking relationship counseling had "surged" during lockdown. As 2020 drew to a close, divorce rates around the world had noticeably increased with many previously content couples having separated due to the cumulative stresses brought about by COVID-19. British law firm Stewarts logged a 122% increase in enquiries between July and October 2020, compared with the same period in 2019. In the US, 'Legal Templates', a legal contract-creation site, reported a 34% increase in sales of its basic divorce agreement, in the first half of 2020, compared to the same time period in 2019. It was reported that newlyweds married in the previous five months to that made up 20% of these sales. A noticeable increase in the number of applications for divorce during the coronavirus pandemic also occurred in Sweden. The UK charity Citizens Advice reported a spike in searches for online advice on ending a relationship. In January 2022 it was revealed the U.K.'s largest family law firm reported a 95% increase in divorce inquiries during the pandemic (detecting a majority of inquiries coming from women).

As vaccinations began to be extended to children, differences of opinion between parents also strained marriages and relationships.

=== Suicides ===
The pandemic triggered concern over increased suicides, caused by social isolation due to quarantine and social-distancing guidelines, fear, and unemployment and financial factors. A 2020 study reported that suicide rates were either the same or lower than before the pandemic began, especially in higher income countries, as often happens in crises.

The number of crisis hotlines calls increased, and some countries established new hotlines. For example, Ireland launched a new hotline aimed at older generations that received around 16,000 calls in its first month in March 2020. The Kids Helpline in the Australian state of Victoria reported a 184% increase in calls from suicidal teenagers between early December 2020 and late May 2021.

A March 2020 survey of over 700,000 people in the UK reported that 1 in 10 people had suicidal thoughts as a result of lockdown. Charities such as the Martin Gallier Project as of November 2020 had intervened in 1,024 suicides during the pandemic.

Suicide cases remained constant or decreased, although the best evidence is often delayed. According to a study conducted on twenty-one high and upper-middle-income countries in April–July 2020, the number of suicides remained static. These results were attributed to factors, including the composition of mental health support, financial assistance, family/community support, use of technology to connect, and time spent with family members. Despite this, isolation, fear, stigma, abuse, and economic fallout increased. Self-reported levels of depression, anxiety, and suicidal thoughts were elevated during lockdown, according to evidence from several countries, but did not appear to have increased suicides.

According to CDC surveys conducted in June 2020, 10.7 percent of adults aged 18 and up said they had seriously considered suicide in the previous 30 days. They ranged in age from 18 to 24 and were classified as members of minority racial/ethnic groups, unpaid caregivers, and essential workers.

Few studies have been conducted to examine suicides in low- and lower-middle-income countries. WHO stated, "in 2016, low- and middle-income countries accounted for 79 percent of global suicides." This is because of registration system limitations, and lack of real-time suicide data.

Middle income Myanmar and Tunisia were studied along with low-income Malawi. The study reported that, "In Malawi, there was reportedly a 57% increase in January–August 2020, compared with January–August 2019, and in Tunisia, there was a 5% increase in March–May 2020, compared with March–May, 2019. By contrast, in Myanmar, there was a 2% decrease in January–June 2020, compared with January–June 2019."

Damage to the economy is associated with higher suicide rates. The pandemic put many businesses on hold, led to reduced employment, and triggered a major stock market drop.

Stigma is a primary cause. Frontline workers, the elderly, the homeless, migrants, and daily wage workers were more vulnerable. Stigma led to reported suicides in infected individuals in Bangladesh and India.

=== Long COVID ===
Long COVID is the wide range of long term symptoms that appear in patients for weeks or months after the initial infection. It has been widely associated with a range of mental health effects, such as depression, PTSD, "brain fog", and anxiety. These symptoms can persist for months and impact daily quality of life in a severe manner.

== Impact in China ==
Studies reported that the outbreak had a significant impact on mental health, with an increase in health anxiety, acute stress reactions, adjustment disorders, depression, panic attacks, and insomnia. Relapses and increased hospitalization rates are occurring in cases of severe mental disorders, obsessive-compulsive disorder, and anxiety disorders. All of which increase suicide risks. National surveys in China (and Italy) revealed a high prevalence of depression and anxiety, both of which increase suicide risks.

One Shanghai district reported 14 cases of suicides among primary and secondary school students as of June 2020, more than annual averages. Domestic media reported additional suicides by young people even though topics like suicide are usually avoided in Chinese society.

A psychological intervention plan was developed by the Second Xiangya Hospital, the Institute of Mental Health, the Medical Psychology Research Center of the Second Xiangya Hospital, and the Chinese Medical and Psychological Disease Clinical Medicine Research Center. It focused on building an intervention medical team to provide online courses for medical staff, a hotline team, and interventions. Online education and counseling services were created for social media platforms such as WeChat, Weibo, and TikTok. Printed books about mental health and COVID-19 were republished online. Free electronic copies were available through the Chinese Association for Mental Health.

A study of Chinese participants showed that adolescents also had negative impacts to their wellbeing during the COVID-19 lockdown. This study explored how increases in depression, anxiety, and insomnia created difficulties of adolescents when it came to academic engagement during online learning.

== Impact in other countries ==
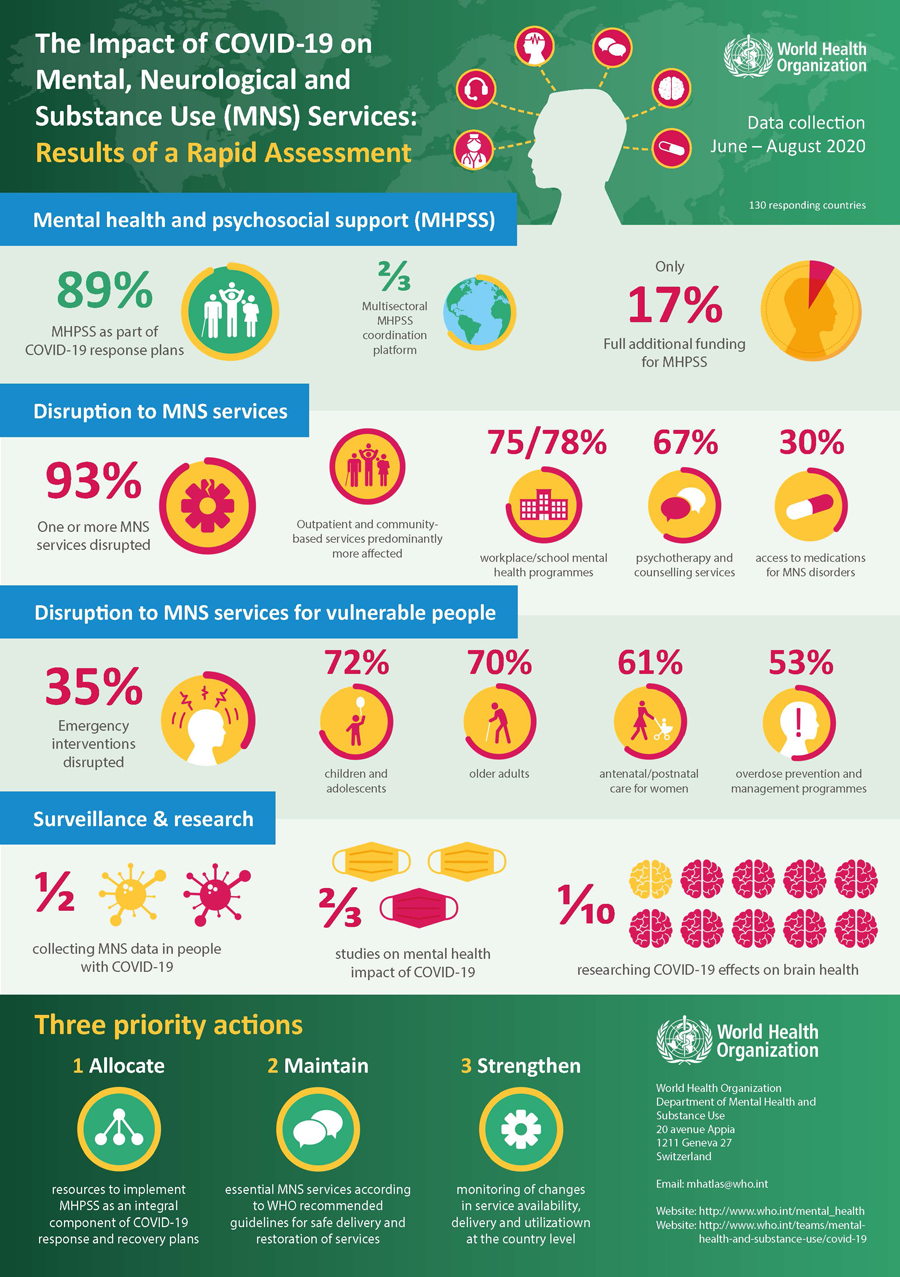
An infographic from the World Health Organization showing statistics related to the impact of COVID-19 on mental health

COVID-19 lockdowns were first used in China and later worldwide by national and state governments. Most workplaces, schools, and public places were closed. Lockdowns closed most mental health centers. Patients who already had mental health disorders may have worsened symptoms.

=== Fiji ===
In September 2021, mental health organizations and an advisor to the government urged the government to address suicide prevention, although suicides in 2020 were lower than in 2019, as they warned that Fiji was beginning to suffer from a "mental health epidemic."

=== Italy ===
Italy was the first country to enter a nationwide lockdown. According to a questionnaire, 21% of participants reported moderate to extremely high depression, while 19% reported moderate to extremely high anxiety. Moreover, about 41% reported poor sleep before the lockdown, increasing to 52% during the lockdown. A cross-sectional study of 1,826 Italian adults confirmed the lockdown's impact on sleep quality, which was especially prevalent among females, those less educated, and those who experienced financial problems.

=== India ===
Alcohol bans during the pandemic reportedly led to suicides in India.

=== Pakistan ===
Pakistan is a low-income country and generally has poor mental health and does not prioritize mental health, so the pandemic increased these effects on the population. Pakistan thrives on community living, and the pandemic cut relationships off and increased feelings of distress and negative emotions to the public. Lockdowns were enforced in major cities to control the spread, and emotional welfare deteriorated, causing increased depression, anxiety, PTSD, and stress.

=== Japan ===
In July 2020, Japan was in "mild lockdown", which was not enforced and was non-punitive. A study of 11,333 individuals across Japan were asked to evaluate the impact of a one-month lockdown, answering questions related to lifestyle, stress management, and stressors. It suggested that psychological distress indices significantly correlated with items relating to COVID-19.

One study reported that people had been influenced by anxiety- and trauma-related disorders and by adverse societal dynamics relating to work and PPE shortages.

Overall, suicide rates in Japan appeared to decrease 20% at the beginning, partly offset by a rise in August 2020.

Counseling helplines by telephone or text message are provided by many organizations.

On September 20, 2020, Sankei Shimbun reported that the month of July and August saw more suicides than in the previous year due to the pandemic's economic impact. Estimates for suicide deaths include a 7.7% increase or a 15.1% increase in August 2020, compared to August 2019. Sankei Shimbun further reported that rates increased more among women, with the month of August seeing a 40.1% increase in suicide compared to August 2019.

=== South Africa ===
South Africa implemented a strict lockdown on 26 March 2020 that lasted until 1 June. Of the 860 respondents to an online questionnaire in May 2020, 46% met the diagnostic criteria of anxiety disorder and 47% met the diagnostic criteria of depressive disorder. The participants who met these criteria reported substantial daily life repercussions, but fewer than 20% consulted a formal practitioner. Distress over lockdown and fear of infection were associated with anxiety and depressive symptoms. Pre-existing mental health conditions, younger age, female sex, and living in a non-rural area were associated with more anxiety and depressive symptoms.

=== Spain ===
Spain's outbreak started at the end of February. On March 14, 2020, the Spanish Government declared the state of alarm to limit viral transmission. However, by 9 April Spain reported the second highest rate of confirmed cases and deaths. 36% of participants reported moderate to severe psychological impact, 25% showed mild to severe levels of anxiety, 41% reported depressive symptoms, and 41% felt stressed. A longitudinal study collected data pre-pandemic and during confinement. It reported direct and indirect effects of pre-pandemic cortisol on the changes in self-reported, perceived self-efficacy during confinement. The indirect effects were mediated by increases in working memory span and cognitive empathy. Other longitudinal study reported that older adults did not evidence higher emotional distress than during the initial lockdown. Furthermore, depression remained stable and anxiety significantly decreased. Older adults may adapt to the adverse pandemic impact by using more adaptive resources that reduce their distress.

=== United Kingdom ===
A 2022 study assessed the levels of mental wellbeing and potential for clinical need in a sample of UK university students aged 18–25 during the COVID-19 pandemic. Study has found "higher levels of lockdown severity were prospectively associated with higher levels of depressive symptoms. Nearly all students had at least one mental wellbeing concern at either time point." The results suggest that lockdown has caused "a wellbeing crisis in young people."

=== United States ===
As of November 2020, the rate of deaths from suicide appeared to be unchanged in the US. In Clark County, Nevada, 18 high school students committed suicide over nine months of school closures. In March 2020, the federal crisis hotline, Disaster Distress Helpline, received a 338% increase in calls compared to February and an 891% increase in calls compared to March 2019. Suicide rates increased for African Americans.

The government loosened Health Insurance Portability and Accountability Act (HIPAA) regulations through a limited waiver. It allowed clinicians to evaluate and treat individuals though video chatting services that were not previously permitted, allowing patients to receive remote care. On October 5, 2020, then-president Donald Trump issued an executive order to address mental and behavioral health issues, establishing a Coronavirus Mental Health Working Group. In the executive order, he cited a CDC report that found that during June 24–30, 2020, 40.9% of more than 5,000 Americans reported at least one adverse mental or behavioral health condition, and 10.7% had seriously considered suicide during the month preceding the survey. On 9 November 2020, a study reported findings from an electronic health record network cohort study using data from nearly 70 million individuals, including 62,354 individuals. Nearly 20% of COVID-19 survivors were diagnosed with a psychiatric condition between 14 and 90 days after diagnosis, including 5.8% first-time psychiatric diagnoses. Among patients without previous psychiatric history, patients hospitalized for COVID-19 had increased incidence of a first psychiatric diagnosis compared to other health events analyzed. Together, these findings suggest that COVID-19 may increase psychiatric sequelae, and those with pre-existing psychiatric conditions may be at increased risk for COVID-19.

=== Vietnam ===
As of January 2021, Vietnam had largely returned to everyday life. The government employed effective communication, early development of test kits, contact tracing, and containment based upon epidemiological risk rather than symptoms. By appealing to universal Vietnamese values such as tam giao (Three Teachings), the Vietnamese government encouraged a culture that values public health. However, Vietnamese patients quarantining reported psychological strain associated with the stigma of sickness, financial constraints, and guilt from contracting the virus. Frontline healthcare workers at Bach Mai Hospital in Hanoi who quarantined for greater than three weeks reported comparatively poorer self-image and general attitude when compared to shorter term isolees.

== Mental health aftercare ==
Academics theorized that once the pandemic stabilizes or ends, supervisors should allow time for first responders, essential workers, and the general population to reflect and create a meaningful narrative rather than focusing on the trauma. The National Institute for Health and Care Excellence recommended active monitoring of staff for issues such as PTSD, moral injuries, and other associated mental illness.

== Telemental health ==
Delivering mental health services through telecommunications technology (mostly videoconferencing and phone calls), also known as telepsychiatry or telemental health, became common. Due to lockdowns or 'stay at home' orders at the start of the COVID-19 pandemic, mental health services in high-income countries were able to adapt existing service provision to telemental health care. Estimates suggest that between 48% and 100% of service users who were already receiving care at the start of the pandemic were able to continue their mental health care using remote methods. Some face-to-face appointments still took place if necessary.

The benefits of telemental health include accessibility, increased safety due to less in-person contact, and reducing the use of scarce personal protective equipment. The role of telemental health and telehealth in lowering fatality rates and preventing increased presence in high-risk areas such as hospitals was generally significant.

A recent study of COVID-19 and Open Notes reports promising evidence of patients' benefits when reading their clinical notes online from mental health care. When patients read their clinical notes from mental health care, they report an increased understanding of their mental health, feeling in control of their care, and enhancing trust in their clinician. Patients' are also reported to get feelings of greater validation, engagement, remembering their care plan, and acquiring a better awareness of potential side effects of their medications.

== Long-term consequences ==
According to the Inter-Agency Standing Committee (IASC) Guidelines on Mental Health and Psychosocial Support, the pandemic produced long-term consequences. Deterioration of social networks and economies, survivor stigma, anger and aggression, and mistrust of official information are long-term consequences.

While some consequences reflect realistic dangers, others stem from lack of knowledge. Many community members show altruism and cooperation in a crisis, and some experience satisfaction from helping others. While most adolescents experienced a decline in mental health during the pandemic, some reported improvements due to changes in their lifestyle and reduced social pressures that lead to behavioral changes. Some may have positive experiences, such as pride about coping. One study examined how individuals cope and find meaning across 30 countries. The study reported that people who were able to reframe their experiences in a positive way had lower levels of depression, anxiety, and stress. Gender, socioeconomic factors, physical health, and country of origin were not associated with outcome measures. Another study of nearly 10,000 participants from 78 countries found similar results, with 40% reporting well-being. Another study reported that positive stressor reframing allowed individuals to view the adversity as a growth opportunity, rather than a crisis to be avoided.

Once recovered from COVID-19, many will continue to experience long-term effects of the virus. Of these effects may include a lost or lessened sense of taste and smell, which is a result of the virus affecting cells in the nose. While this symptom is not fatal, an absence of these senses for a prolonged amount of time can cause lack of appetite, anxiety, and depression. Those admitted to the ICU while battling their direct infection of the COVID-19 virus experience mental health consequences as a result of this stay, including PTSD, anxiety, and depression. However, even those who had never been hospitalized could be at higher risk of depressive and anxiety symptoms for an extended period of time.

== See also ==
- COVID fatigue
- Impact of the COVID-19 pandemic on time perception
- TikTok tics
