= AIDS fatigue =

AIDS fatigue is a phenomenon wherein individuals or societies who had been concerned about the impact of HIV or AIDS become desensitized to having a strong emotional response to HIV issues after receiving continual messages about the danger over a long period of time.

== Causes ==
Anthony Fauci, former director of the United States' National Institute of Allergy and Infectious Diseases at the National Institutes of Health (NIH), said that one of the causes of AIDS fatigue are huge successes in treatment which subsequently have made some people perceive the disease as less concerning. Fauci noted that whereas in the 1980s in the United States "we had 30-40 percent of the hospital wards in inner-city hospitals occupied by people with advanced HIV disease, now because of the success of the therapies — which is great news — we don't have that."

== Consequences ==
Some of the consequences of AIDS fatigue include the following:

- the stigma of having HIV decreases
- individuals' fear of disclosing HIV status weakens
- media coverage becomes easier
- media interest and coverage frequency reduces
- less blame directed for infection
- sexuality and gender issues become easier to discuss
- less adherence to medicine regimens
- less care taken to engage in safer sex

== Examples ==
HIV infection is increasing at a rate of 12% annually among 13–24-year-old American men who have sex with men. Experts attribute this to "AIDS fatigue" among younger people who have no memory of the worst phase of the epidemic in the 1980s and early 1990s, as well as "condom fatigue" among those who have grown tired of and disillusioned with the unrelenting safer sex message. The increase may also be because of new treatments.

== See also ==
- Compassion fatigue
- Pandemic fatigue
