= Condom fatigue =

Reason for decreased condom usage

Condom fatigue is a term used by medical professionals and safer sex educators to refer to the phenomenon of decreased condom use. It is related to decreased effectiveness of safer sex messages because people who realize the necessity of condoms still perpetuate the phenomenon. It is typically expressed as a frustration with the idea of a future filled with less sexual pleasure due to the use of condoms.

The term has particularly been used to describe men who have sex with men, though the term applies to people of all genders and sexual orientations. Condom fatigue is linked to increased HIV infection, as consistent condom use can significantly lower one's risk of transmitting or catching HIV.

Condom fatigue is not a universal phenomenon. In Germany, condom use between new sexual partners has increased between 1994 and 2010 from 65% to 87%. That being said, it is seen in many different cultures in both the United States and other parts of the world.

== Among gay men ==
Historically, gay men are most often the sufferers of condom fatigue. For gay men, condom fatigue can be linked to length of relationship, as men who have been practicing safer sex for longer time periods are more likely to present fatigue. Condom fatigue can also be related to fears about sex, in part due to condom use's constant link with HIV/AIDS prevention. Because of this, some gay men favor biomedical treatments for HIV/AIDS over condoms. Condom fatigue is further related to the HIV/AIDS epidemic as not using a condom puts men who have sex with men at a higher risk of contracting the disease.

Although condom fatigue is often cited as a reason for inconsistent condom use, it is not necessarily expressed as a complete disavowal of condoms. Many gay men continue to use them despite their fatigue. Rather, condom fatigue acts in combination with other factors of inconsistent condom use, such as the perception of lower sexual satisfaction when using a condom or thinking one is not at risk of STIs.

== Among heterosexuals ==
Condom fatigue also affects people in heterosexual encounters. This has become more of an issue as the AIDS epidemic has spread from mainly affecting gay males to affecting women and heterosexual males at comparable or higher rates. In heterosexual relationships, the woman often relies on the man to provide condoms, making her condom use reliant on his willingness to use one and putting the brunt of the phenomenon on men. Despite this and other factors leading to women's lack of power in relationships, such as reliance on one's husband for basic necessities, women can also experience condom fatigue.

Condom fatigue is especially prevalent in long-term couples who may believe that since they know their partner well they no longer need to worry about AIDS. This fatigue can be exacerbated by the desire to feel closer to one's partner during sex.

== Examples ==
HIV infection is increasing at a rate of 12% annually among 13–24-year-old American men who have sex with men. Experts attribute this to "AIDS fatigue" among younger people who have no memory of the worst phase of the epidemic in the 1980s and early 1990s, as well as "condom fatigue" among those who have grown tired of and disillusioned with the unrelenting safer sex message. The increase may also be because of new treatments.
