= Julia L. Marcus =

American public health researcher and epidemiologist

Julia Lenore Marcus
- Education: University of California, Berkeley (PhD)
- Scientific career
- Workplaces: Harvard Medical School
- Thesis: Maximizing Effectiveness of HIV Preexposure Prophylaxis Among Men Who Have Sex with Men (2013)

Julia Lenore Marcus is an American public health researcher and infectious disease epidemiologist at Harvard Medical School. Her research focuses on improving the implementation of pre-exposure prophylaxis (PrEP) for HIV prevention in the United States. Marcus is also a popular science communicator, and has contributed to The Atlantic.

== Early life and education ==
Marcus attended Wesleyan University, where she earned a bachelor's degree in sociology and women's studies. Her undergraduate thesis considered the criminalisation of sexual deviance. She moved to the University of California, Berkeley for her graduate studies, where she worked toward a master's in public health. She was appointed as an epidemiologist for the sexually transmitted disease section at the San Francisco Department of Public Health. She eventually completed her doctoral degree in epidemiology at the University of California, Berkeley, where she studied the effectiveness of Pre-Exposure Prophylaxis (PrEP) in men who have sex with men in the United States. After earning her doctoral degree, Marcus moved to the research branch of Kaiser Permanente. There she studied the life expectancy of people living with HIV, finding a dramatic increase in survival over time but a persistent gap compared to people without HIV. Her research on hepatitis C treatment among Black patients at Kaiser Permanente led to the elimination of race-based treatment guidelines for hepatitis C infection by the Infectious Diseases Society of America and the American Association for the Study of Liver Diseases. She also studied the implementation of PrEP at Kaiser Permanente, including studies that are now cited by the Centers for Disease Control and Prevention as evidence of the effectiveness of PrEP.

== Research and career ==
In 2016, Marcus was appointed to the faculty in the Department of Population Medicine at Harvard Medical School and the Harvard Pilgrim Health Care Institute. Her research focuses on optimising the implementation of PrEP, including the use of electronic health records and predictive analytics to improve PrEP prescribing. In 2020, she received the Office of Disease Prevention's Early-Stage Investigator Lecture award from the National Institutes of Health. The award recognizes early-career prevention scientists who have not successfully competed for a substantial NIH-supported research project, but who have already made outstanding research contributions to their respective fields and are poised to become future leaders in prevention research.

During the COVID-19 pandemic, Marcus has written about public health communication related to coronavirus disease, including what lessons could be learned from the HIV epidemic. She took part in a CNN town hall on the pandemic, where she advocated for a harm reduction approach rather than "abstinence-only messaging." In the early years of the AIDS epidemic, HIV prevention campaigns often used moralistic and fear-based messaging, which tended to perpetuate stigma and drive people away from public health efforts. Likewise, Marcus believed that shaming or policing people who were engaging in behaviors that were high risk for coronavirus transmission, including not wearing face coverings or having large gatherings, would be counterproductive. She argued that public health messaging and policy related to coronavirus prevention, including face masks, should be compassionate rather than punitive and support people in overcoming their barriers to adopting preventive behaviors, similar to the approaches used by effective public health efforts to promote safer sex for HIV prevention.

== Selected publications ==
- Volk, Jonathan E.; Marcus, Julia L.; Phengrasamy, Tony; Blechinger, Derek; Nguyen, Dong Phuong; Follansbee, Stephen; Hare, C. Bradley (2015-11-15). "No New HIV Infections With Increasing Use of HIV Preexposure Prophylaxis in a Clinical Practice Setting". Clinical Infectious Diseases. 61 (10): 1601–1603. doi:10.1093/cid/civ778. ISSN 1058-4838. PMC 4809999. PMID 26334052.
- Marcus, Julia L.; Glidden, David V.; Mayer, Kenneth H.; Liu, Albert Y.; Buchbinder, Susan P.; Amico, K. Rivet; McMahan, Vanessa; Kallas, Esper Georges; Montoya-Herrera, Orlando; Pilotto, Jose; Grant, Robert M. (2013-12-18). "No Evidence of Sexual Risk Compensation in the iPrEx Trial of Daily Oral HIV Preexposure Prophylaxis". PLOS ONE. 8 (12) e81997. Bibcode:2013PLoSO...881997M. doi:10.1371/journal.pone.0081997. ISSN 1932-6203. PMC 3867330. PMID 24367497.
- Marcus, Julia L.; Chao, Chun R.; Leyden, Wendy A.; Xu, Lanfang; Quesenberry, Charles P.; Klein, Daniel B.; Towner, William J.; Horberg, Michael A.; Silverberg, Michael J. (2016-09-01). "Narrowing the Gap in Life Expectancy Between HIV-Infected and HIV-Uninfected Individuals With Access to Care". Journal of Acquired Immune Deficiency Syndromes. 73 (1): 39–46. doi:10.1097/QAI.0000000000001014. ISSN 1525-4135. PMC 5427712. PMID 27028501.

=== Selected popular science articles ===
- Marcus, Julia (2020-08-15). "The Fun Police Should Stand Down". The Atlantic.
- Marcus, Julia (2020-07-21). "Colleges Are Getting Ready to Blame Their Students". The Atlantic.
- Marcus, Julia (2020-06-23). "The Dudes Who Won't Wear Masks". The Atlantic.
- Marcus, Julia (2020-05-28). "Americans Aren't Getting the Advice They Need". The Atlantic.
- Marcus, Julia (2020-05-11). "Quarantine Fatigue Is Real". The Atlantic.
- "Will the new PrEP pill for HIV prevention fuel progress — or profits?". STAT. 2020-02-26.
