= TikTok tics =

Social-media-associated rise in functional tic-like behaviors

TikTok tics was a wave of functional tic-like behaviors that emerged among adolescents during the COVID-19 pandemic. The term refers to genuine symptoms rather than their deliberate imitation. The phenomenon was associated with the popularity of tic-related videos on TikTok and other platforms. It was reported internationally and predominantly affected teenage girls and young women.

Clinics in several countries had a sharp increase in their share on new tic-related patients. Symptoms resembled those of Tourette syndrome but often differed in their age on onset, rapid progression and complexity. They were identified as manifistations of functional neurological disorder rather than as new cases of Tourette syndrome. Researchers proposed that main factors of those disorders were social modelling of tic-like movements, exposure to tic-related vides and the psychological effects of the COVID-19 pandemic. Some research described the phenomenon as a form of mass psychogenic illness or mass social-media-induced illness.

The term "TikTok tics" was coined in 2021 and is used both in press and medical literature.

== Background ==
Tourette syndrome is a neurodevelopmental tic disorder usually beginning in childhood. Functional tic-like behaviors may involve similarly involuntary movements and sounds but many of the cases during the pandemic had a comparatively abrupt onset of complex symptoms at older age, in adolescence or young adulthood, without a prior history of childhood tics.

== Emergence and spread ==
Clinics in several countries reported increasing numbers of adolescents presenting with rapid-onset tic-like movements and vocalizations around the beginning of the COVID-19 pandemic. In 2021 eight specialist centers in Canada, the United States, the United Kingdom, Germany and Australia described similar presentations in patients. The patients were predominantly girls and young women aged 12-25.

In 2021, Mariam Hull and Mered Parnes described six teenage girls assessed at the pediatric movement disorders clinic of Texas Children's Hospital in Houston. The patients had experienced rapid onset of tic-like movements after watching videos by the same popular TikTok creator. The authors considered the presentation consistent with functional tics, while noting the need to distinguish them from Tourette syndrome.

In Germany, psychiatrist Kirsten R. Müller-Vahl and colleagues described patients who presented with Tourette-like symptoms resembling movements and vocalizations popularized by the YouTube channel Gewitter im Kopf – Leben mit Tourette. They proposed the term mass social-media-induced illness for the apparent spread of similar behavior through online videos. Some patients used German expressions associated with the channel and reproduced distinctive complex movements. The channel, presented by Jan Zimmermann and Tim Lehmann, was itself widely watched during this period.

In Spain, pediatric neurologist Ana Camacho and Darío Ortigoza of Hospital Sant Joan de Déu discussed unconscious imitation as a possible factor.

An investigation by the Minnesota Department of Health concerned an outbreak of tic-like symptoms at a high school in September–October 2021. Eight girls aged 15–17 met the investigators' case definition. The authors of the investigation, published in 2023, considered underlying anxiety and other mental-health factors more relevant to the cluster than recent SARS-CoV-2 infection; the investigation did not establish social-media exposure as the cause.

== Epidemiology ==
Proportion of new tic-related referrals primarily involving functional tic-like behaviors at five specialist clinics before and during the COVID-19 pandemic (January–June 2021). Source: Pringsheim et al. (2021). View source data.

The overall number of people affected by the pandemic-era rise in functional tic-like behaviors is unknown. At five clinics in Canada, Australia, the United Kingdom and the United States, the estimated proportion of new tic-related referrals primarily involving functional tic-like behaviors increased from 1–5% before the pandemic to 20–35% in January–June 2021. At the Children's Hospital at Westmead in Sydney, a separate analysis found that the proportion of new tic-clinic patients with functional tic-like behaviors increased from 2% in 2018 to 36% in 2021.

An international registry assembled data on 294 patients assessed for functional tic-like behaviors at ten tertiary referral centers in eight countries between late 2019 and June 2022. A separate British specialist-clinic study described 105 consecutive patients who developed functional tics between April 2020 and March 2023. These are clinical series, rather than counts of all cases worldwide, and some other published series include patients also represented in the international registry. Separately, a population-based analysis of English primary-care records found that the incidence of newly recorded tic symptoms among girls aged 12–18 increased from 2.5 per 10,000 person-years in 2015–2019 to 10.3 in 2020 and 13.1 in 2021. Those records covered tic symptoms generally, not specifically diagnosed functional tic-like behaviors.

== Social-media research ==
A 2021 study by Caroline Olvera and colleagues at Rush University Medical Center analyzed tic-like movements and vocalizations in videos from 28 popular TikTok content creators. The researchers selected creators using tic-related hashtags and compared the observed behaviors with the clinical features commonly reported in Tourette syndrome. They found a high frequency of complex movements and vocalizations and considered the videos' phenomenology more consistent with functional tic-like behaviors than with typical Tourette syndrome. Because the study relied on publicly posted videos, the authors could not obtain a clinical history or establish a diagnosis for individual creators.

In another study, published in 2022, Alonso Zea Vera and colleagues examined 100 of the most-viewed videos using TikTok's #tourettes hashtag. Pediatric movement-disorder specialists found that many videos contained complex vocalizations, movements and behavioral disturbances atypical of the usual presentation of Tourette syndrome, and cautioned that such videos might give viewers a misleading picture of the disorder. The analysis concerned video content rather than clinical diagnoses of the creators or viewers.

Researchers examining the outbreak have discussed both social contagion and the broader influence of pandemic-related stress, isolation, anxiety and depression. Social media was considered a possible means of spreading recognizable behaviors across geographical boundaries, unlike earlier clusters of mass psychogenic illness that usually involved close personal contact. Nevertheless, exposure alone does not demonstrate that social media caused an individual's symptoms, and not all patients reported watching tic-related content.

Some early reporting described TikTok tics as a new social-media-related disorder, a characterization distinct from clinicians' classification of the symptoms as functional tic-like behaviors.

== Media coverage and responses ==
News reporting and patient advocates debated the role of social-media exposure, the potential value of online support communities, and the risk of confusing involuntary functional symptoms with deliberate imitation. Coverage in Wired and The Guardian included both clinicians' concerns about possible social modeling and accounts of people who found support online.

== Clinical characteristics and diagnosis ==
The reported functional tic-like presentations have commonly included sudden onset in adolescence, complex motor movements involving the limbs or trunk, vocalizations, socially inappropriate words or gestures, and episodes sometimes described as tic attacks. Anxiety and depressive symptoms were also frequently reported. These characteristics contrast with the more gradual, typically childhood onset of Tourette syndrome, but none is by itself conclusive: clinical studies have found overlap between functional tic-like behaviors and neurodevelopmental tic disorders.

An international working group assembled by the European Society for the Study of Tourette Syndrome published proposed diagnostic criteria in 2023, based on age of onset, speed of symptom progression and combinations of clinical features. The authors noted that the criteria had not yet been prospectively tested for diagnostic sensitivity and specificity. Researchers have cautioned against treating symptom checklists as absolute distinctions. Some people with Tourette syndrome have complex tics or abrupt changes in symptoms, while some patients diagnosed with functional tic-like behaviors do not display the features initially considered typical of the pandemic-era cases. There are also patients with both conditions.

== Clinical response and outcomes ==
Clinical approaches described in reviews have emphasized careful diagnosis, an explanation of functional symptoms, psychoeducation and individualized treatment of associated psychological or neurological difficulties. Treatments used specifically for Tourette syndrome, including tic-suppressing medication, may be inappropriate when the presentation is functional rather than neurodevelopmental. Psychological interventions and management of anxiety or depression can form part of care; evidence for specific treatments continues to develop.

The Hospital Sant Joan de Déu guidance discussed reducing excessive attention to tic-like symptoms, limiting exposure to relevant social-media material where appropriate, and seeking mental-health assessment when symptoms persist or substantially interfere with daily life. Reviews and follow-up studies have reported improvement in many patients, although outcomes vary and long-term evidence remains limited.

A 2024 retrospective study of 56 young patients at Boston Children's Hospital found that up to 79% improved during follow-up, although some continued to have significant difficulties in overall functioning. In a German follow-up study published in 2026, 26 of 30 patients reported some improvement or complete remission after an average of 26 months. The researchers did not find a relationship between changes in daily social-media use and prognosis within that sample.

== See also ==
- 2011 Le Roy, New York illness outbreak
- Mass psychogenic illness
- Functional neurologic disorder
- Societal and cultural aspects of Tourette syndrome
- Morangos com Açúcar Virus
