= Julia Marcus (dancer) =

Swiss dancer

Julia Marcus (24 December 1905 – 17 July 2002) was a Swiss dancer and choreographer.

== Biography ==
Julia Marcus was born on 24 December 1905 in St. Gallen, Switzerland. Marcus began her dancing career as a cabaret dancer in Switzerland and Germany. She went on to study under Rudolph von Laban, Elisabeth Duncan, and Mary Wigman. In 1931 she joined the Berlin City Opera ballet company under the direction of Lizzie Maudrik. Marcus was known for dark, dramatic performances in eccentric and expressionist dance. Her original works include Mexican-Aztec Suite (1930) and grotesque parodies of contemporary figures including Al Jolson (1931), which was performed in blackface, Adolf Hitler (1931), Gerhart Hauptmann (1932), and Gandhi (1933). In her parody pieces she wore masks that she created while working with Erich Goldstaub in Berlin. In her 1932 piece In Der Friedensengel, Marcus wore an oversized mask resembling Aristide Briand along with a tuxedo shirt and jacket with a white ballet tutu. Her parody works were satires on diplomatic gesturing. In her 1933 piece Wälzer she danced wearing a gas mask.

Marcus was a Communist and in cabaret performances would dance parodies of people from all social classes including a sewing machine operator, a servant, and a symphony conductor. She set some of her dances to music by the Communist composer Hanns Eisler. She was also anti-military and incorporated her political ideologies into her performances. During the Third Reich, her performances opportunities were severely limited, so she began touring around Europe, entering the cabaret scenes in Warsaw, Amsterdam, and Zürich. In 1933 she settled in Paris and collaborated with Ludolf Schild, Lisa Duncan, and Mila Cirul. In 1937 she and Schild created the ballet Le Fièvre du Temps at the Théâtre Pigalle.

She died on 17 July 2002.
