= COVID-19 misinformation by the United States =

False information propagated by U.S. officials

U.S. Surgeon General
(@Surgeon_General)
tweeted:

Seriously people- STOP BUYING MASKS!
They are NOT effective in preventing general public from catching #Coronavirus, but if healthcare providers can't get them to care for sick patients, it puts them and our communities at risk!
bit.ly/37Ay6Cm

Feb 29, 2020

Misinformation related to the COVID-19 pandemic has been propagated by various public figures, including officials of the United States government. The Trump administration in particular made a large number of misleading statements about the pandemic. A Cornell University study found that then-president Donald Trump was "likely the largest driver" of the COVID-19 misinformation infodemic in English-language media. Trump downplayed the virus and promoted unapproved drugs. Other officials were accused of spreading misinformation, including then-U.S. Secretary of State Mike Pompeo, backing conspiracy theories regarding the origin of the virus, several U.S. senators, and then-New York City mayor Bill de Blasio, who downplayed the virus.

The United States Department of Defense conducted a clandestine social media operation to spread disinformation about Chinese COVID-19 vaccines in Southeast Asia, Central Asia, and the Middle East. This operation was initiated under the Trump administration in early 2020 and discontinued by the Biden administration in early 2021.

== Trump administration ==
In the early stages of the pandemic, Trump's pronouncements "evolved from casual dismissal to reluctant acknowledgement to bellicose mobilization". Though Trump "occasionally adopted health officials' more cautious tone", the optimism that dominated his early response "hadn't completely disappeared"; Trump had downplayed the threat of COVID-19 over 200 times by November 3.

Then-president Donald Trump and his then-top economic adviser Larry Kudlow have been accused of spreading misinformation about the coronavirus. On February 25, 2020, Trump said, "I think that whole situation will start working out. We're very close to a vaccine." At the time, SARS-CoV-2 had been spreading in the United States undetected for weeks, and development of a vaccine against the virus was predicted to require a minimum of one year. In an interview with Sean Hannity on March 4, Trump also claimed that the death rate published by the World Health Organization was false and that the correct fatality rate was less than 1 percent. He said, "Well, I think the 3.4 percent is really a false number — and this is just my hunch — but based on a lot of conversations with a lot of people that do this, because a lot of people will have this and it's very mild, they'll get better very rapidly. They don't even see a doctor. They don't even call a doctor. You never hear about those people", that the potential impact of the outbreak was exaggerated by Democrats plotting against him, and that it was safe for infected individuals to go to work. In a later tweet, Trump denied having made claims regarding infected individuals going to work, contrary to footage from the interview.

As U.S. cases reached 4,800,000 and U.S. deaths reached 157,690, Trump repeated his assertion that he believes coronavirus will "go away" despite his top public health expert warning that it could take most of 2021 or longer to get the pandemic under control. Trump "made numerous versions of this assertion over...more than six months".

The White House accused media of intentionally stoking fears of the virus to destabilize the administration. The Stat News reported that "President Trump and members of his administration have also said that U.S. containment of the virus is 'close to airtight' and that the virus is only as deadly as seasonal influenza. Their statements range from false to unproven, and in some cases, underestimate the challenges that public health officials must contend with in responding to the virus." Around the same time the "airtight" claim was made, SARS-CoV-2 was already past containment; the first case of community spread of the virus had been confirmed, and it was spreading faster than SARS-CoV-1, the virus responsible for the 2002–2004 SARS outbreak, with a case fatality rate at least seven times the rate for seasonal flu.

Trump repeatedly compared COVID-19 to influenza, despite the fact that COVID-19's mortality rate was estimated to be approximately ten times higher. On February 26, he stated, "This is a flu. This is like a flu." On March 9, Trump compared the 546 known US cases of COVID-19 at the time and the 22 known deaths at the time to the tens of thousands of U.S. deaths from flu each year. On March 24, Trump argued that: "We lose thousands and thousands of people a year to the flu ... But we've never closed down the country for the flu." On March 27, he stated: "You can call it a flu". On March 31, Trump changed his stance: "It's not the flu ... It's vicious ... I knew everything. I knew it could be horrible, and I knew it could be maybe good."

=== March 2020 ===
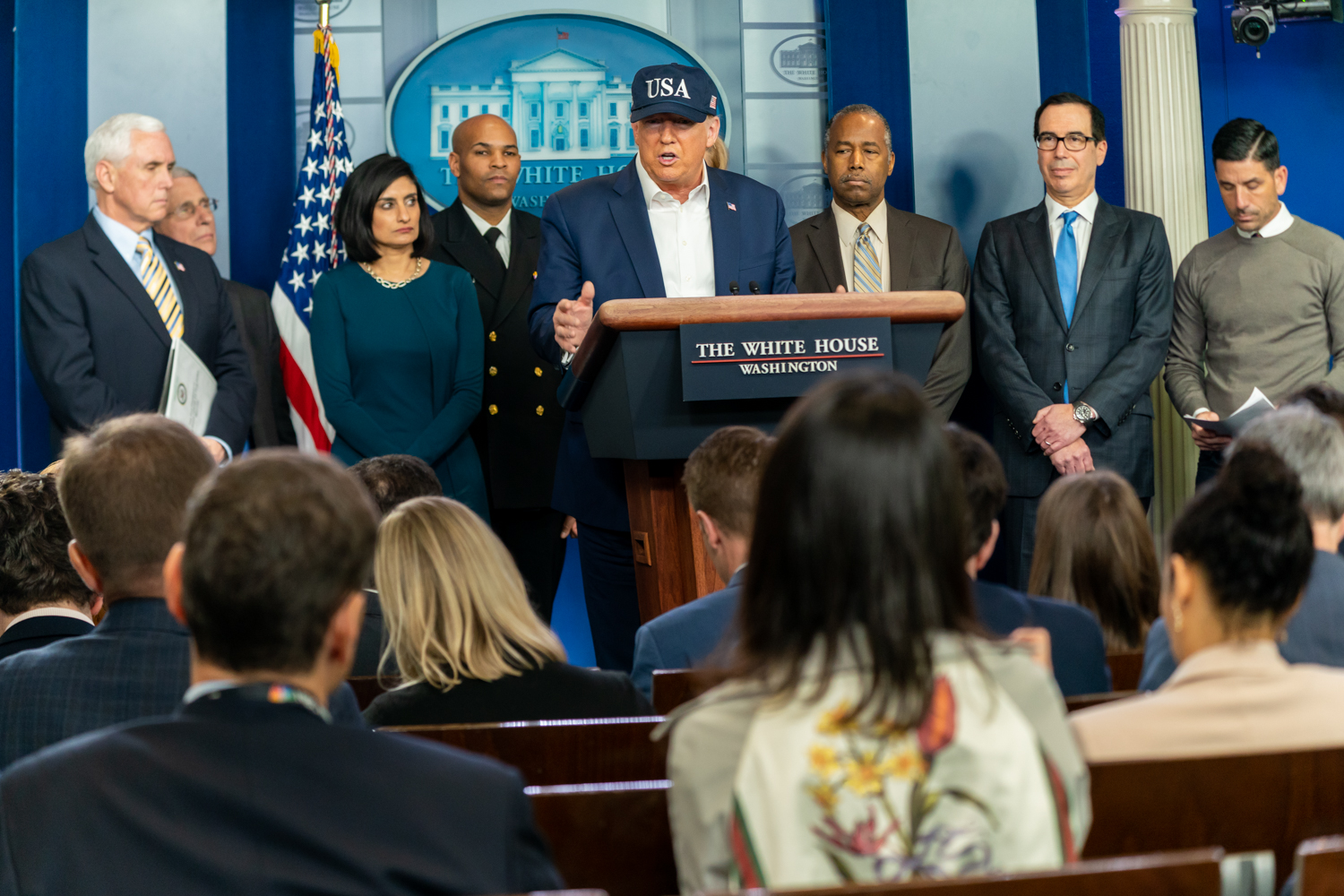
March 14 press briefing

On March 4, Trump blamed the Barack Obama administration for making "a decision" that delayed COVID-19 testing by the Trump administration. The policy in question had never been modified by the Obama administration, despite plans to do so. The policy's overall legal roots date to 2004, before the Obama administration. Under the umbrella of Emergency Use Authorizations, the old policy stated that laboratory-developed tests "should not be used for clinical diagnoses without FDA's approval, clearance, or authorization during an emergency declaration". However, this policy was historically treated as a recommendation and generally unenforced, with no clear legal authority of the FDA in this area. The Trump administration continued to require laboratories to apply to the FDA for approval, but allowed the laboratories to test while the FDA processed the applications.

On Downplaying the Virus

"The President never downplayed the virus."

— Kayleigh McEnany, September 9, 2020

"I wanted to always play it down. I still like playing it down because I don't want to create a panic."
—Trump, recorded privately on March 19, 2020

(Bob Woodward released recording in Sept.)

On March 6, Trump over-promised on the availability of COVID-19 testing in the United States, claiming that "anybody that wants a test can get a test." Firstly, there were criteria needed to qualify for a test; recommendations were needed from doctors or health officials to approve testing. Secondly, the lack of test supplies resulted in some being denied tests even though doctors wanted to test them.

On March 19, Trump falsely claimed the drug chloroquine was approved by the Food and Drug Administration as a treatment for COVID-19. This led the FDA to say it had not approved any drugs or therapies for COVID-19, and strongly advised people against taking it outside of a hospital or clinical trial, due to possibly fatal side effects. While Trump claimed that "we're going to be able to make that drug available almost immediately", the leader of the FDA said the drug would still need to be tested in a "large, pragmatic clinical trial" on subjects infected with COVID-19. While Trump promoted chloroquine as a potential "game changer", Fauci said positive results thus far were still based on anecdotal evidence and not "definitive" evidence from clinical trials. At a later press briefing, Trump prevented Fauci from answering a question about the medical evidence of the effectiveness of hydroxychloroquine. Trump also remarked that re-purposing existing drugs for COVID-19 is "safe" and "not killing people", however most drugs may cause side effects. Chloroquine and its derivative hydroxychloroquine are FDA-approved to treat certain parasitic infections (e.g. malaria) and auto-immune diseases such as lupus and arthritis. Potentially serious side effects from chloroquine or hydroxychloroquine include irregular heartbeats, tinnitus, blurred vision, muscle weakness or "mental changes". Overdoses of these drugs have been documented in scientific literature, including fatal overdoses. Demand for chloroquine in Lagos, Nigeria sharply increased after Trump's comments, with three people overdosing by March 23. An Arizona engineer in his 60s died after ingesting a fish tank cleaner containing chloroquine phosphate in a vitamin cocktail prepared by his wife. The wife stated she intended to medicate her husband against the coronavirus after hearing Trump tout the potential benefits of chloroquine during a public briefing.

On March 21, Trump addressed a shortage of ventilator supply in the United States, claiming that carmaker companies General Motors (GM) and Ford "are making them right now" when the companies were not producing ventilators at the time, and had yet to change their factories' production abilities.

On March 30, Trump claimed his administration "inherited a broken test" for COVID-19. "That wasn't from us. That's been there a long time," he said. The claim was illogical because no previous administration could have prepared a test for a disease which had yet to emerge. COVID-19 emerged during Trump's presidency, having first been reported on December 31, 2019. The test was designed in 2020 by the Centers for Disease Control under the Trump administration. Trump continued to make the false claim on April 19.

=== April 2020 ===
U.S. president Donald Trump suggested at a press briefing on April 23 that disinfectant injections or exposure to ultraviolet light might help treat COVID-19. There is no evidence that either could be a viable method.

From April 2 to 9, the White House was in a standoff with CNN, which frequently declined to air the daily coronavirus Task Force briefings, and which fact-checked Trump's remarks. The White House said that if CNN did not begin airing the part of the briefing that featured the Task Force members, including Mike Pence, then the White House would disallow national health experts (including Anthony Fauci and Deborah Birx) from appearing on CNN. Pence relented and allowed Robert R. Redfield to appear on CNN.

On April 13, Donald Trump played a video at a White House briefing that defended his handling of his pandemic; the video was described as propaganda.

During an April 15 White House news conference, Trump said the US government is trying to determine if the COVID-19 virus emanated from the Wuhan Institute of Virology. The vice director of the Wuhan Institute of Virology called the accusations a "conspiracy theory".

On April 23, after a Homeland Security official stated that certain disinfectants can kill the coronavirus on surfaces, Trump openly wondered if disinfectants could be used on humans "by injection", saying "it'd be interesting to check" if that was a potential treatment. Injecting disinfectants into the body is dangerous and potentially lethal. Trump also suggested another "interesting" method to be tested: "we hit the body with a tremendous—whether it's ultraviolet or just very powerful light ... supposing you brought the light inside of the body, which you can do either through the skin or in some other way." He asked coronavirus response coordinator Deborah Birx if heat or light can be used as a treatment, to which Birx stated she had not seen any treatments using heat or light. Trump attributed these ideas to him being "a person that has a good you-know-what".

The next day, the White House accused the media of taking Trump's words "out of context". In 2024, a New York Times fact-check determined Trump «did not instruct people to inject bleach, but suggested that doing so with a disinfectant was an "interesting" concept to test out». Trump said he had spoken in a "very sarcastic" manner and that he had addressed his comment "to reporters ... just to see what would happen", this despite the video showing he had addressed not reporters but rather Deborah Birx directly, and had also been looking at Bill Bryan, head of the DHS science and technology division. In his defense, Trump also tried revising his comment to say disinfectant "would kill [the virus] on the hands, and that would make things much better." Disinfectants are useful for destroying microorganisms on inert surfaces, not on living tissue, and applying disinfectants on skin has the potential to cause irritation or chemical burns. After the president's remarks, the United States Environmental Protection Agency, the makers of Lysol, the World Health Organization, and other government officials issued various advisories pointing out that it is already known to be harmful to use disinfectants or ultraviolet radiation on human bodies instead of inanimate surfaces, and Birx explained that these were not under investigation as possible treatments.

On COVID-19 testing

Think of this: If we didn't do testing—instead of testing over 40 million people, if we did half the testing, we would have half the cases. If we did another—you cut that in half, we would have, yet again, half of that.

— Rose Garden press conference
July 14, 2020

After Trump's comments, "hundreds of calls" were made to the Maryland health department emergency hotline "asking if it was right to ingest Clorox or alcohol cleaning products—whether that was going to help them fight the virus", stated the Republican governor of Maryland, Larry Hogan. He called for the White House to communicate "very clearly on the facts", because people "certainly pay attention when the president of the United States is standing there giving a press conference". Other increases in calls to poison control centers were reported in the city of New York, and the states of Michigan, Tennessee, and Illinois. The state of Illinois also reported incidents where people have used detergents for sinus rinses, and gargling with a mixture of bleach and mouthwash. Officials of the state of Kansas said on April 27 that a man drank disinfectant "because of the advice he'd received", but did not clarify the source of the advice. When Trump was asked by a reporter about "a spike in people using disinfectant after your comments last week", Trump interrupted the question, stating: "I can't imagine why." The reporter continued by asking: "Do you take any responsibility?" Trump replied: "No, I don't."

United States Secretary of State Mike Pompeo, in April 2020, refused to rule out the conspiracy theory that COVID-19 escaped from Wuhan Institute of Virology during experiments and China covered it.

=== Mid and late 2020 ===
On "totally harmless" cases

Now we have tested over 40 million people. But by so doing, we show cases, 99 percent of which are totally harmless.

— South Lawn "Salute to America" speech
July 4, 2020

In May 2020, The Guardian published an article revealing that the United States government was funding a website in Armenia called Medmedia.am that was spreading COVID-19 disinformation, including discouraging Armenians from participating in future vaccination programs.This funding was originally awarded as a grant to promote democracy, however was used to spread disinformation amongst the citizens of Armenia instead. The website included a disclaimer that its content is not necessarily representative of US views and ideals.

On effectiveness of masks

Just the other day (the CDC) came out with a statement that 85 percent of the people that wear masks catch it.

— NBC Town Hall, 15 October 2020
On COVID-19 death count

"Well, why aren't they talking about deaths? Oh, oh, because the number is almost nothing. Because we've gotten control of this, and we understand how it works."

— Donald Trump Jr., October 29, 2020
(deaths that day: about 1,000)

On July 4, 2020, Trump falsely stated that "99 percent" of COVID-19 cases are "totally harmless". In the same speech, Trump contradicted several public health experts by saying that the U.S. will "likely have a therapeutic and/or vaccine solution long before the end of the year". FDA commissioner Stephen Hahn declined to state whether Trump's "99 percent" statement was accurate or to say how many cases are harmless.

As the U.S. COVID-19 daily new case count increased from about 20,000 on June 9 to over 50,000 by July 7, Trump repeatedly insisted that the case increase was a function of increased COVID-19 testing. Trump's claims were contradicted by the facts that states having increased case counts as well as those having decreased case counts had increased testing, that the positive test rate increased in all ten states with the largest case increases, and that case rate increases consistently exceeded testing rate increases in states with the most new cases.

In a recorded interview with Bob Woodward on February 7, 2020, Trump underscored the deadliness of the coronavirus in his recount of a conversation with Chinese Communist Party general secretary Xi Jinping, but, in another recorded interview with Woodward on March 19, Trump revealed that he wanted to downplay the viral outbreak in order to not create a panic. The revelation of the recordings led to criticism that Trump had deliberately downplayed the threat of the virus to the public, while he actually knew the severity of the virus.

As reported cases reached new record highs in October 2020, the White House Office of Science and Technology Policy named "ending the Covid-19 pandemic" as a top accomplishment of the Trump administration.

In October 2020, Trump falsely asserted, "Our doctors get more money if someone dies from COVID."

Throughout the Trump Administration, members of the opposing political party spread misinformation or greatly exaggerated actions by the administration, such as the "misleading at best" claim by New York City Mayor Mike Bloomberg that "Trump 'has slashed funding of the CDC and other essential health agencies,' " even though his proposed cuts were ignored by Congress.

=== April 2025 ===
As of April 19, 2025, the federal website Covid.gov, which previously linked to information about vaccines, testing and treatment, now redirects to a new website championing the theory that the coronavirus that causes COVID-19 was a human-made pathogen.

== Senators ==
Several members of the U.S. Senate—particularly Richard Burr (R-NC) and Kelly Loeffler (R-GA)—have come under scrutiny for sales of large amounts of stocks before the financial markets crashed due to the outbreak, sparking accusations that they had insider knowledge from closed-door briefings, while many of them publicly downplayed the risks posed by the health crisis to the US public. An audio recording from February 27 revealed that Burr (Senate Intelligence Committee chairman) gave dire warnings to a small group of well-connected constituents in private, contrasted in severity to his public statements and not known to the public, that the virus is "much more aggressive in its transmission than anything that we have seen in recent history", advising against travel to Europe (13 days before official warnings, 15 days before the ban), saying schools will be likely be closed (16 days before the closure), and suggesting the military might be mobilized (learned three weeks later from the recording).

Senate Majority Leader Mitch McConnell in May 2020 falsely claimed that "clearly the Obama administration did not leave to [the Trump] administration any kind of game plan for" pandemics. Lara Trump, the president's daughter-in-law, stated that McConnell was "exactly right". However, the Obama administration had in actuality left a pandemic response playbook of 69 pages. That document explicitly cited novel coronaviruses as needing a major governmental response. Additionally, in January 2017, the Obama administration had gone through an exercise in pandemic response with incoming Trump administration members.

== Military ==
According to a Reuters report published on June 14, 2024, the United States Armed Forces ran a propaganda campaign to spread disinformation about Chinese COVID-19 vaccines in the Philippines, the wider Southeast Asia region, Central Asia, and the Middle East between the spring of 2020 and mid-2021. This disinformation campaign involved using fake social media accounts posing as native speakers to promote content emphasizing the Chinese origins of COVID-19 and alleging that the Sinovac vaccine was unsafe and contained pork-derived ingredients, making it haram under Islamic law.

Under US law, the US military is prohibited from targeting American citizens with propaganda. According to the Reuters report, the-then Special Operations Command Pacific commander General Jonathan P. Braga had lobbied The Pentagon to combat Chinese COVID-19 diplomacy in Southeast Asia in the information space. Braga's goal was to ensure that the region understood the origin of the virus while promoting skepticism towards what were then considered untested vaccines. Several State Department officials objected to Braga's approach. Ultimately, the Pentagon prevailed due to a 2019 secret order by Secretary of Defense Mark Esper raising the Pentagon's competition with China and Russia to active combat priority, enabling military commanders to sidestep the State Department when conducting overseas psychological operations. In the Philippines, the campaign released Tagalog posts which emphasized COVID-19's Chinese origins and claimed that Chinese vaccines, personal protective equipment and face masks were unsafe.

By June 2020, the United States Central Command had launched its own psyop campaign targeting Chinese vaccines, claiming that the SinoVac vaccine was derived from pork products, making it haram under Islamic law. The US military's social media campaigns used numerous accounts on several social media platforms including Twitter, Facebook and Instagram. In mid-2020, Facebook executives complained that the US military's fake accounts violated the platform's policies against fake accounts and COVID-19 misinformation. The Pentagon argued that these fake accounts were being used for counterterrorism purposes and asked Facebook not to take down these accounts. Though the Pentagon pledged to stop these COVID-19 vaccine disinformation activities, they persisted until mid-2021 when they were discontinued by the Biden administration.

Following Joe Biden's inauguration in 2021, Facebook executives organized a Zoom meeting with Biden's National Security Council (NSC), which adopted a pro-vaccine policy and sought to combat vaccine hesitancy in developing countries. In spring 2021, the NSC ordered the US military to cease all anti-vaccine messaging, which persisted until summer 2021. In late 2021, an internal Pentagon review uncovered the anti-vaccine disinformation campaign. It criticised General Dynamics IT, the military's primary contractor handling the campaign, for failing to adequately conceal the origins of the social media posts, and military leaders for their inadequate oversight over psyop contractors. The Pentagon subsequently reversed parts of Esper's 2019 and reinstated the prior mandate for the US military to work closely with US diplomats. It also restricted broad messaging psyop operations aimed at foreign audiences.

According to former WHO adviser Nina Castillo-Carandang and former Filipino Secretary of Health Esperanza Cabral, these vaccine disinformation campaign contributed to a high rate of vaccine hesitancy in the Philippines, raising the country's COVID-19 infection rate and death toll. On June 20, 2024, Philippines Senator Imee Marcos and House Representative France Castro filed resolutions in the Congress of the Philippines calling for an investigation into the US military disinformation campaign in the Philippines.

In response, Department of Defense spokeswoman Lisa Lawrence acknowledged that the Pentagon conducted a wide range of operations in the "information environment" to counter "adversary malign influence" on various platforms including social media. She added that "China [in 2020] initiated a disinformation campaign to falsely blame the United States for the spread of COVID-19."

== Others ==
After the December 2020 introduction of COVID vaccines, a partisan gap in death rates developed, indicating the effects of vaccine skepticism. As of March 2024, more than 30 percent of Republicans had not received a Covid vaccine, compared with less than 10 percent of Democrats.

January 31, 2020, Vox Media tweeted that COVID-19 would not be a deadly pandemic. They deleted the tweet on March 23, 2020, and linked to their more current coverage.

In February 2020, Dr. Anthony Fauci, Director of the U.S. National Institute of Allergy and Infectious Diseases (NIAID) and the eventual chief medical advisor to President Joe Biden stated that the virus was not a serious threat in the United States.

In February 2020, New York City Health Commissioner Oxiris Barbot announced "We're telling New Yorkers, go about your lives, take the subway, go out, enjoy life." Barbot also tweeted, "As we gear up to celebrate the #LunarNewYear in NYC, I want to assure New Yorkers that there is no reason for anyone to change their holiday plans, avoid the subway, or certain parts of the city because of #coronavirus."

According to The Washington Post in March 2020, Republican government members were largely influenced by series of articles by Richard A. Epstein of the Hoover Institution, who consistently played down the scale of the epidemics, ridiculed the "panic" being spread by "progressives", made a number of incorrect statements about the SARS-CoV-2 virus, misapplied and misconstrued Darwinian evolutionary theory in regards to the pandemics, and predicted "about 500 deaths at the end" of the epidemics. U.S. Representative Louie Gohmert from Texas hinted in July that he caught coronavirus because he wore a mask more often in the days leading up to his infection.

In spring 2020, Bill de Blasio, the mayor of New York City, was widely criticized for providing poor and misleading information to the public. On March 10, he said he would keep schools open and if an infected student was found to be in class it would take only a day to clean and re-open the school. De Blasio also said, "If you're under 50 and you're healthy, which is most New Yorkers, there's very little threat here." During a photo op at a public 3-1-1 call center, he told a caller there was no need to self-quarantine, despite the fact she had just returned from Italy. His instructions to the caller were subsequently reversed by city officials.

In summer 2020, then-U.S. Presidential nominee Joe Biden argued that Trump's response to the pandemic was to offer "denials, delays, and distractions, many of which were xenophobic". In July 2020, Biden also made various claims against the Trump administration's pandemic response that were rated misleading and inaccurate in a fact check by The New York Times.

From spring 2020 to early 2021, New York Governor Andrew Cuomo's administration hid the number of COVID-19 deaths in nursing homes in an effort to downplay the death totals for the state of New York.

A 2020 study by researchers from Northeastern, Harvard, Northwestern and Rutgers universities found that older registered voters of all political orientations shared more COVID-19 stories from fake news websites on Twitter, with Republicans over the age of 65 being the most likely to share COVID-19 stories from fake news websites.

In a February 2021 opinion piece in The Wall Street Journal, former Secretary of State Mike Pompeo claimed that "most signs point to the Wuhan Institute of Virology, or WIV, as the source of Covid-19", a theory that has been described as 'extremely unlikely' by World Health Organization scientists in a preliminary investigation into the origins of the virus. The crucial phase 2 of the investigation was abandoned by the WHO after the plan was rejected by China, which took particular issue with the WHO's intention to audit the laboratories in Wuhan.

In a December 2021 interview United States President Joe Biden falsely claimed that "People vaccinated for COVID-19 "do not spread the disease to anyone else."

On January 2, 2022, Representative Marjorie Taylor Greene's personal Twitter account was permanently suspended for "repeated violations of our COVID-19 misinformation policy", according to a Twitter spokesperson. Her official congressional account, however, was not suspended, and remained active.

== See also ==
- Trump administration communication during the COVID-19 pandemic
- COVID-19 misinformation in Canada
- COVID-19 misinformation by governments
- COVID-19 misinformation in the Philippines
