= COVID-19 misinformation in the Philippines =

Misinformation related to the COVID-19 pandemic in the Philippines consists of disinformation about the COVID-19 pandemic propagated by various sources.

== Measures against misinformation ==
The Department of Health of the Philippines has advised against spreading misinformation and unverified claims concerning the pandemic.

The Philippine National Police has also taken action against the spread of misinformation related to the pandemic and has warned the public that misinformation purveyors could be charged for violating Presidential Decree no. 90 for "declaring local rumor, mongering and spreading false information". In the case of misinformation circulated online, violators could be charged for violating the Cybercrime Prevention Act which has a maximum penalty of imprisonment for 12 years. The Bayanihan to Heal as One Act also punishes fake news peddlers of two months jail time or fine of up to ₱1 million.

== Misinformation by subject ==
=== Origin ===
Misinformation on the virus's origin included that SARS-CoV-2 was a type of rabies along with advice to not eat bats. The virus is in the coronavirus family and is unrelated to rabies.

=== Treatment and cure ===
- Boiled ginger as a cure for COVID-19. There is no concrete scientific proof for this claim. Mark Pasayan, a doctor from the Philippine Society for Microbiology and Infectious Diseases says that while cold weather may make one more susceptible to the COVID-19 infection, the intake of hot or cold food does not correlate with the prevention and treatment of the disease.
- Viral posts with various claims such as avoidance of eating ice cream and cold food, and encouraging exposure to sunlight as a means of prevention against COVID-19 purportedly from UNICEF. UNICEF Philippines has issued a statement disassociating itself from the posts peddling false and misleading information.
- A widely circulated graphic on social media claimed that gargling warm water with salt would "eliminate the virus." DOH Undersecretary Eric Domingo said that while the saline water has been a recognized home treatment for symptoms of a sore throat for many generations, there is no evidence suggesting its capability to kill the virus.
- A supposed video spread on the internet about how bananas can cure COVID-19. This information was even advocated by the presidential Spokesperson Salvador Panelo. However, DOH Spokesperson Ma. Rosario Vergeire debunked this claim, saying that while bananas are a healthy food, there is no conclusive evidence yet about its effectiveness against the virus.
- On March 21, 2020, several netizens on Facebook shared misleading posts about the Philippine Air Force and the Philippine National Police using helicopters to spray pesticides among major cities in an effort to disinfect the virus. The Armed Forces of the Philippines, the Philippine National Police, the Department of Health, and the Inter-Agency Task Force for the Management of Emerging Infectious Diseases (IATF-EID) have refuted these claims. Furthermore, the Department of Health added on its official website that there is no evidence that pesticide sprays can kill the Coronavirus.
- A statement of President Rodrigo Duterte claiming that gasoline may be used as a disinfectant in absence of hand sanitizers has been refuted by the Integrated Chemists of the Philippines and warned the public that gasoline is harmful to the body especially if inhaled.
- In April 2021, videos in YouTube and Facebook purported that Ivermectin is already fully approved by the Food and Drug Administration as a cure for COVID-19. The drug was only granted compassionate use for such purpose in one hospital. Ivermectin in the Philippines is only authorized to be used in animals for treatment of heartworm, while for humans the drug is only allowed "in topical formulations under prescription use only".

=== Transmission ===
- The DOH supposedly issued an advisory on the proliferation of fake cigarettes which was claimed to be a method of transmission of COVID-19. The government agency did not issue such advisory.

=== Lockdowns and travel restriction ===
- In the first week of February, the government supposedly imposed a 14-day quarantine for travelers coming from 20 countries. An infographic supporting the claim was circulated purportedly from the Department of the Interior and Local Government (DILG). On February 7, the DILG denied the claim. At that time the quarantine measure is only being imposed on travelers from three territories: Mainland China, Macau, and Hong Kong.
- The Palace also disproved posts circulating online about the declaration of "Total Lockdown" nationwide and warned its peddlers of imminent arrest. At the time of the circulation, the enhanced community quarantine in Luzon was already in effect.

=== Vaccination ===
According to a report by Reuters published in 2024, the United States ran a propaganda campaign to spread disinformation about the Sinovac Chinese COVID-19 vaccine, including using fake social media accounts to spread the disinformation that the Sinovac vaccine contained pork-derived ingredients and was therefore haram under Islamic law. The campaign primarily targeted people in the Philippines and used a social media hashtag for "China is the virus" in Tagalog. The campaign ran from the spring of 2020 to mid-2021. A subsequent Reuters report found that the Embassy of China in Manila hired a local marketing firm to conduct a covert "public opinion guidance" astroturfing campaign on social media that included promoting Sinovac's CoronaVac and disparaging Western-made vaccines.

In August 2021, thousands of people lined up at vaccination sites across Metro Manila, many without prior registration, following false information that the unvaccinated would be ineligible to receive aid or be allowed to leave their homes during the enhanced community quarantine in the metropolis. The DOH issued a statement that it would not allow the national vaccination program to cause superspreader events. Critics of President Rodrigo Duterte cite the president's prior rhetoric that unvaccinated people would not be allowed to leave their homes.

=== Other ===
According to the DOH, the cremation of the body of the first confirmed COVID-19 death in the Philippines has been hampered by the proliferation of misinformation.

== See also ==
- COVID-19 misinformation
- COVID-19 misinformation by governments
- COVID-19 misinformation by the United States
- COVID-19 misinformation in Canada
