= Timeline of misinformation and disinformation in Canada =

This timeline largely excludes COVID-19 misinformation in Canada and conspiracy theories related to the COVID-19 pandemic in Canada.

Disinformation is "false information that is purposely spread to deceive people". Misinformation is information that is false or misleading, that contradicts consensus by experts in the field or by the "best available evidence". Malinformation is content grounded in truth but presented in a misleading or exaggerated way, which can lead to misconceptions and harm. It manipulates factual elements to mislead audiences through distortion or selective emphasis.

In January 2019, just days after publicly calling out technology giants, Prime Minister Trudeau announced the first federal financing of $7 million to respond to online misinformation and disinformation in Canada.

In August 2021, the Canadian Election Misinformation Project was launched by McGill University in response to concerns about the rise of misinformation during the COVID-19 pandemic and the increase in foreign interference in elections globally. According to McGill's 2022 Media Ecosystem Observatory's report, Canada's information landscape is fragmenting, with citizens increasingly relying on diverse and potentially unreliable sources for political information, raising concerns about echo chambers. The rise of minimally moderated platforms has created a chaotic environment, making it harder to combat disinformation. A disconnect exists between the actual prevalence of misinformation and public perception, potentially eroding trust in democratic processes. Additionally, a growing segment of Canadians has become deeply skeptical of democratic institutions, operating in an alternate information reality disconnected from mainstream narratives. According to the Canadian Centre for Cyber Security (CCCS) the annual cost globally of "misinformation, disinformation, and malinformation" (MDM) represents billions of dollars.

== 2000s ==
=== 2003 ===
- — A petition with 1,180 signatures was submitted to the House of Commons alleging that "massive amounts of chemicals"—adversely affecting Canadians across the country—were sprayed by the federal government. Health Canada and Environment Canada refuted the claims. The Environment Canada statement said that the term 'chemtrails' was a "popularised expression" and that petitioners were seeing contrails—airplane condensation trails. The decades-old chemtrail conspiracy theory has been "widely debunked by scientists and experts, who emphasize there is no credible evidence to support the claims associated with this theory".

=== 2005 ===
- April 15 — The Boston Globe retracted a story published on April 13, 2005, about the opening of the annual commercial seal hunt in the Gulf of St. Lawrence. The article, which graphically described the ice and water turning red with the blood of hundreds of seal cubs, was entirely fabricated. The actual first day of the seal hunt occurred on April 15, two days after the story was submitted by a Halifax-based freelance writer. The seal hunt was a contentious issue, drawing attention from organizations like the Humane Society of the United States (HSUS). In response, the Globe published a follow-up article titled "Animal rights vs. Inuit rights," co-authored by an Inuk graduate student from Harvard University's Kennedy School of Governance. This piece highlighted the devastating impact on Inuit communities that relied on subsistence seal hunting for their livelihood. The article noted how a successful international media campaign by animal rights activists in the 1980s collapsed the sealskin market, affecting both commercial and subsistence hunting—a campaign that included the distribution of 12 million postcards depicting baby seals across both sides of the Atlantic.

== 2010s ==
=== 2014 ===
- — Canadian pro-Putin groups have promoted Russian narratives about the Annexation of Crimea by the Russian Federation which marked the beginning of the Russo-Ukrainian War.
- — The Canadian Anti-Spam Legislation (CASL) was unveiled. At that time, seven of the world's top spamming organizations were active in Canada.
- March 26, 2014 Canadian Inuk Alethea Arnaquq-Baril—writer and director of the 2016 Inuit-themed feature-length documentary film Angry Inuk—initiated a "sealfie" protest in response to Oscar host Ellen DeGeneres's support of the anti-seal-hunting Humane Society of the United States (HSUS). During the Oscar ceremony, DeGeneres took the "Oscar Selfie" using a Samsung smartphone. Samsung pledged to donate one dollar for each retweet of the photo, which broke Twitter records and temporarily crashed the platform. DeGeneres subsequently donated US$1.5 million to the HSUS, describing the seal hunt as "one of the most atrocious and inhumane acts against animals allowed by any government". In response, the "sealfies" movement gained traction, rallying support for Inuit subsistence sealing. HSUS spokesperson Rebecca Aldworth clarified that their protests targeted commercial sealing in Atlantic Canada by non-aboriginal people, not the "socially accepted Inuit subsistence hunt" in Canada's North.

=== 2017 ===
- March 14 — Russian disinformation in Canada included the "Nazi-grandfather" conspiracy theory that claims that descendants of Nazis who are currently living in Canada have amassed "outsized political power." Chrystia Freeland became a target of the hoax. Canadian pro-Putin groups continued to promote false narratives about the Russo-Ukrainian War and the Annexation of Crimea by the Russian Federation.

=== 2018 ===
- June 9 — The G7 Rapid Response Mechanism (G7 RRM) was established in Charlevoix, Quebec at the "Charlevoix Commitment on Defending Democracy from Foreign Threats" by the leaders of the Group of Seven (G7) countries—United States, Canada, Japan, United Kingdom, France, Germany and Italy. The G7 RRM focusses on "addressing foreign-sponsored disinformation".
- October — The Canadian Centre for Cyber Security (CSSS) was established with Scott Jones as the head.

=== 2019 ===
- January 25 — Trudeau criticized social media giants at a public event in Quebec City, with particularly sharp rhetoric against Facebook for spreading disinformation around the world.
- January 29 — The Canadian government announced a $7 million plan to fight online misinformation and disinformation ahead of the 2019 Canadian federal election. The government also called on social media platforms to be more proactive in combatting disinformation by implementing policies.
- — In response to the increase in "false, misleading and inflammatory" online disinformation, the federal government created the Digital Citizen Initiative, to "support democracy and social inclusion in Canada". The Digital Citizen Initiative is also supporting the Canadian Digital Media Research Network (CDMRN).
- June 8 — In the collage of dozens of individuals illustrating New York Times front-page story "The Making of a YouTube radical", journalist Luke LeBrun, identified 40% of the radicals as Canadian.
- July 16 — Anti-Trudeau hashtags #TrudeauMustGo topped Twitter's trends on July 16 after Trudeau criticized President Trump on July 15 for his racist tweets in which he told four U. S. congresswomen to go back to where they came from. The tweets were generated at non-human rates by new accounts. The Atlantic Council's Digital Forensic Research Lab (DFRLab) said that this represented a volume which far exceeded the number and intensity of negative hashtags directed at other political parties. It did not point to direct involvement of domestic political campaigns.
- October 29 A Global News report uncovered a hate group with 19,577 members called "Justin Trudeau Must Be Stopped Facebook" using the platform's feature, members-only Groups, a Facebook feature since 2010 that extreme online subcultures were beginning to exploit more often. This Group's posts—which included hatred against Muslims and immigrants, and in some cases, called for Trudeau's assassination—led to its removal.
- The CPC chair, Bob Zimmer, of the House of Commons Standing Committee on Access to Information, Privacy and Ethics said that the 2015 Canadian federal election was largely "unencumbered by interference", although there were some attempts to "disrupt, misinform and divide", but these "efforts" were "uncoordinated", limited in number, and had little if any impact. However, by 2019, the threat to and vigilance of democracies around the globe had been heightened as tools that had been developed and used to strengthen civic engagement, [were] "being used to undermine, disrupt and destabilize democracy."
- — During the 2019 Canadian federal election there was not a lot of misinformation or disinformation but it was a threat to the public sphere, according to a 2020 Public Policy Forum journal report.
- — By 2019, due to 2014's CASL, all seven of the top spamming organizations that had been active in Canada in 2014, had been removed.

== 2020s ==
=== 2020 ===
- — The Digital Society Lab at McMaster University was created by political scientist, Clifton van der Linden and receives some funding from Canada Foundation for Innovation and SSHRC.

=== 2021 ===
- January – Scientists and health experts established ScienceUpFirst—a digital science education campaign to counter misinformation—instigated by Timothy Caulfield and Nova Scotia Senator Stan Kutcher. It has received funding from the Government of Canada and the Canadian Association of Science Centres.
- July 25 — According to Canada's National Observer, dozens of accounts "tweeting at non-human rates" posted the #TrudeauMustGo hashtag shortly after Prime Minister Justin Trudeau's criticized Donald Trump for making racist comments. The Observer described the anti-Trudeau hashtags as an emerging "wave of disinformation". Fake X accounts—formerly Twitter— run be automated bots is a form of "aggressive social media manipulation", according to Social Media Intelligence Unit (SMIU) analyst. Social Cartograph's Geoff Golberg, a social media manipulation researcher, said that hashtag #NotABot, which followed the previous hashtag, is also a "form of disinformation in itself". He added that those who push disinformation "tend to run a similar playbook when called out for engaging in coordinated inauthentic activity".

=== 2022 ===
- June — As Canada and the United States worked on developing domestic rare earth mining projects—minerals that are strategically critical to electronics manufacturing— spamouflage a Chinese government online disinformation program created social media accounts disguised as local residents, to protest against the mines in a effort to quell competition against China's rare minerals mining industry, according to a 2022 report by Mandiant, a cybersecurity research company. A 2022 campaign called "Dragonbridge" by Madiant protested Canada's Appia Rare Earths & Uranium Corporation's new mine in Saskatchewan. Mendiant reported that these fake accounts, numbering in the thousands, have used the camouflage of non-political spam combined with pro-Chinese and anti-West propaganda since 2019. It is a Chinese government online disinformation program.
- Shortly before the 2022 Quebec general election, Coalition Avenir Québec Premier François Legault cautioned that adding more immigrants who do not speak French to Quebec would be suicidal for the French language. At the same time, Jean Boulet, the outgoing Immigration Minister, said that "80% of immigrants go to Montreal, don't work, don't speak French, or don't adhere to Quebec's values." Radio-Canada refuted the statement point by point, reporting that 77% of immigrants in Greater Montreal (89% outside it) know French and that their employment rate is comparable to or higher than that of Canadian-born residents. Boulet was reprimanded by (CAQ) Coalition Avenir Québec Premier François Legault.

=== 2023 ===
- January — The 131-page report entitled "Fault Lines: Expert panel on the socioeconomic impacts of science and health misinformation" by the Council of Canadian Academies (CCA), sponsored by Innovation, Science and Economic Development Canada (ISED), said that Canadian political discourse has seen the emergence of post-truth rhetoric—traditionally associated with totalitarian regimes where objective facts are contested. This has led to the proliferation of misinformation, an erosion of trust in our institutions, decreased political engagement, and a deterioration of public discourse.
  - Tenet Media Network's founder—Canadian right-wing conservative activist and influencer—Lauren Chen, allegedly received a contract from Russia Today (RT) to recruit other conservative commentators to influence U.S. public opinion. Included among those she recruited were Matt Christiansen, Tayler Hansen, Benny Johnson, Tim Pool, Dave Rubin, and Lauren Southern to be a part of the Tenet Media network. These well-known right-wing commentators were duped into spreading Russian misinformation.
- May 9 — During the 2023 Canadian wildfires, with evacuations taking place in Yellowhead County, Alberta, Mayor Wade Williams tweeted on X, to tell residents to stop relying on Facebook for information on the wildfires as the platform was "full of false information". According to a York University expert on wildfire communication, during disasters, online information can be "really reliable" but it can also be "straight-up misinformation" and even "disinformation where you have actors intentionally seeding incorrect information."
- August 23 — Prime Minister Trudeau announced the creation of a dedicated team to counter disinformation sponsored by Russia, that will include collaboration with the G7 Rapid Response Mechanism (RRM).
- November 1 — Spamouflage accounts posted deepfake videos of Chinese dissident Liu Xin in an attempt to discredit him, according to Global Affairs Canada. The videos falsely portrayed Canadian politicians, such as Justin Trudeau and Pierre Poilievre, violating ethical and legal standards.
- November 9 — In a response to a question about how he would stop the "waterfall" of fentanyl coming into the United States if he became the next United States president in the 2024 election, Republican Party hopeful, biotech CEO Vivek Ramaswamy said that he would build a wall on both the northern and southern borders citing without evidence that Canada was a major source of fentanyl coming into the U.S. While he was technically correct in saying that the amount of fentanyl seized at the Canada-United States border was enough to kill millions of Americans, that is due to the highly toxic nature of the drug—only 1 kilogram (2.2 lb) of fentanyl can kill up to a half a million people. From January to November 2023, 26,700 pounds (12,100 kg) were seized at the Mexican border compared to 2 pounds (0.91 kg) at the Canadian border. Approximately 90% of illicit fentanyl is seized at official border crossings. United States citizens are the carriers in most cases.
- November 16 — A Canadian Security Intelligence Service publication "The Evolution of Disinformation: A Deepfake Future" specifically cautioned that technological advances to artificial intelligence (AI) such as GPT-3 provide an unprecedented advantage to the dissemination of disinformation through the deployment of deepfakes—AI-based media manipulations that digitally alter or fully generate images, voices, videos or text created to "deceive and inflict serious harm".
- November 22 — A tragic and unintentional car crash and the resulting explosion on the American side of Niagara Falls' Rainbow Bridge were repeatedly reported as a terrorist attack by some American media and politicians.
- December 20 — According to a 2023 Statistics Canada survey on online misinformation, 59% of Canadians reported very or extreme concerns about online misinformation, while 43% said that distinguishing truth from fiction online was more difficult than in 2000.

=== 2024 ===
- June 19 — At a speech in Ottawa, Canada, NATO Secretary General Jens Stoltenberg called on NATO countries to build resilience to counter misinformation which is part of the assault against the NATO alliance, specifically in order to assist Ukraine in responding to Russia's illegal invasion.
- June–July — Canada's rightwing activists posted conspiracy theories on social media about the 2024 Jasper wildfire that the National Observer called a "disinformation firestorm", part of a larger "climate disinformation campaign" in Canada.
- July — The Royal Canadian Mounted Polices' Canadian Anti-Fraud Centre bulletin warned that bad actors were using advanced deepfake technologies to create convincing videos and audio files that impersonate "politicians, celebrities, and news anchors" with the purpose of committing fraud and/or spreading misinformation.
- August — Canadian respondents to The Dias's "Survey of Online Harms in Canada 2024"—the first Dias survey since the proposed Online Harms Act was tabled—said that the topics that they most commonly associated with misinformation include celebrities, politicians–particularly Donald Trump, Pierre Poilievre, and Justin Trudeau—and the Israeli–Palestinian conflict. According to the poll, people who trust Facebook, YouTube, Twitter/X, TikTok and social media sources more than main stream media as news sources, are more likely to believe in misinformation. Based on self-identified association with left and right-leaning groups, 78% of respondents who self-identify as left-leaning were able to correctly identify misinformation in statements while 34% of those on the right were able to do the same.
- August 31 — Rapid Response Mechanism Canada (RRM Canada)—located at Global Affairs Canada—which leads the G7 Rapid Response Mechanism to monitor and protect against foreign state-sponsored disinformation, identified a Chinese government Spamouflage campaign in Canada on August 31, 2024 and has not stopped as of March 2025. (Note: Spamouflage or Dragonbridge is a Chinese government state-sponsored foreign disinformation or information manipulation campaign that was first reported in 2019.). The campaign, which uses X, Facebook, TikTok and YouTube platforms, uploads 100 to 200 new posts a day. The 2024-2025 campaign is similar to the 2023 campaign, but much larger. Doctored videos and deep fakes are used.
- September 4 — In their campaign to counter Russian interference in the 2024 United States elections and the 2024 United States presidential election, the U.S. Department of Justice unsealed an indictment accusing Russian nationals of giving Tenet Media—$9.7 million to "distribute content to U.S. audiences with hidden Russian government messaging". Chen and her husband, Liam Donovan, the co-founder of Tenet, knew their funding came from 'the Russians'. During the 2024 Tenet Media investigation, it was revealed that Tim Pool, Benny Johnson and Dave Rubin, and other far-right influencers hired by Tenet, claimed they were unaware that it was a Russian disinformation campaign.
- September 13 — In a CBC Radio broadcast, PressProgress's, Luke LeBrun, said that Canada plays an "outsized role in far-right misinformation."
- September — U.S. authorities seized the RRN domain, that hosts the website Reliable Recent News, a Russian disinformation site that features anti-Trudeau and pro-Poilievre articles .
- The federal government produced a guidebook to help public servants combat disinformation.
- September 12 — U.S. Secretary of State Antony Blinken announced that the United States, United Kingdom, and Canada will partner in a "joint diplomatic campaign" to counter Russian disinformation and covert influence around the globe.
- 18 September — Timothy Caulfield—who focuses on debunking pseudoscientific myths and misinformation— raised concerns that politicians who spread conspiracy theories contribute to an "ever-accelerating conspiracy theory vortex", that draws attention away from real social issues to focus on "bogus concerns." He cites examples, of recent laws on chemtrails in the United States, Edmonton's municipal laws to protect against fifteen-minute cities, and laws against mRNA vaccines.
- 28 September — At the 28 September United Conservative Party (UCP) Town Hall in Edmonton, Danielle Smith, premier of the province of Alberta, responded to a concern that the municipality was being sprayed by so-called chemtrails—a "long-held conspiracy theory" that airplane condensation vapours are purposefull nepharious acts. Smith said, "Another person told me, if anyone is doing it, it's the U.S. Department of Defense." While Smith said she had inquired about airspace regulations over the weekend, a Nav Canada statement confirmed they had received no queries from the provincial government. According to an Associated Press article, a spokesman for the North American Aerospace Defence Command (Norad), said there are no NORAD flights involving the spraying of chemicals in Canada. Timothy Caulfield said that in this "age of misinformation", conspiracy theories are detrimental to democracies globally. When a political leader does not identify a conspiracy theory as such and correctly answering that it is not true, it is "horrifying". He added that Smith's comments contribute to the "normalization of conspiracy theories" such as "lizard aliens and a flat earth".
- September — Canada's G7 Rapid Response Mechanism (RRM), which focuses on countering foreign state-sponsored disinformation, reported that after the Canadian government had accused Indian involvement in the murder of Nijjar, certain Indian media outlets, organisations, and journalists had potentially influenced Canadian public opinion by promoting negative narratives against Justin Trudeau, Hardeep Singh Nijjar, and Canada–India relations.
- 2 November — During their annual general meeting, an overwhelming majority of the United Conservative Party (UCP)—Alberta's ruling party—voted on the resolution to strike carbon dioxide from the list of global-heating pollutants and recognize it as a "foundational nutrient for all life on Earth." The "foundational nutrient" narrative originated in the 1990s in the United States with the coal industry's Western Fuels Association's Greening Earth Society. Their videos, "The Greening of Planet Earth (1992) and "The Greening of Planet Earth Continues" (1998) claimed that higher levels of carbon dioxide would boost plant growth and create a greener world. While the claims were scientifically debunked, the narrative was widely distributed.
- December — According to a Canadian Digital Media Research Network (CDMRN) report entitled "Russian Funding of US and Canadian Political Influencers" on foreign influence and interference via Tenet Media, in Canada, Tenet as well as Canadian influencers who repackaged Tenet Media content, had a "significant following and influence". However, the DOJ investigation and indictment garnered little attention in Canada indicating a critical weakness in Canada's information ecology—a significant number of individuals aware of the event were unfamiliar with the social media personalities involved. Conversely, many who recognized these online figures had no knowledge of the incident in question.

=== 2025 ===
- 1 January — The Canadian Medical Association 2025 Health and Media Annual Tracking Survey reported a troubling trend—more Canadians are putting off medical care, facing strain in personal relationships, and dealing with heightened anxiety fueled by false health claims. The report cautioned that an overburdened Canadian health care system, faced a "double whammy", with the public being "bombarded with misinformation"—from debunked cancer myths to vaccine conspiracies—while dealing with gaps in healthcare access, leaving many vulnerable to online falsehoods.
- 12 March — A CNN article listed nine of the false claims Trump made about Canada in 2025 alone.
- 19 March — According to the final report of the Foreign Interference Commission public inquiry, disinformation is the "single biggest risk" to Canadian democracy, highlighting its potential to erode public confidence in democratic institutions, even if it has not significantly altered national election outcomes yet.
- 20 March — A Canadian Centre for Policy Alternatives report said that the there has been a significant decline in the number of local news outlets which created a vacuum where misinformation can take hold.
- 22 March — A CBC analysis highlights the challenges posed by misinformation in U.S.-Canada trade negotiations, citing Ambassador Kirsten Hillman, economist Trevor Tombe, and Agri-Food Economic Systems founder Al Mussell. The prevalence of disinformation, such as exaggerated claims about Canadian tariff rates, has complicated discussions by creating public pressure on U.S. officials to address perceived imbalances that do not reflect actual trade terms. This dynamic risks prolonging disputes, as negotiators face conflicting demands to reconcile factual realities with politically charged narratives that misrepresent standard trade practices.
- 24 March — In a statement, the Chief Electoral Officer of Elections Canada, Stephane Perrault, said that in order to ensure elections integrity in the 2025 Canadian federal election, he has been in communication with X and TikTok and has received positive feedback related to the monitoring of and removal of "harmful misinformation about civic and electoral processes".
- 25 March — At the start of the election campaign, Rachel Gilmore (fr), an award-winning journalist specializing in misinformation and extremism, appeared on CTV to debunk misinformation aimed at undermining Liberal leader Mark Carney’s legitimacy and authority. She clarified that, unlike in the U.S. where presidents are elected and inaugurated, Canada’s Westminster system makes the leader of the party with the most seats in Parliament the prime minister—no prime minister is directly elected, and there is no inauguration, only a swearing-in. Gilmore warned that many people form strong opinions about Canada’s democracy without understanding it, often confusing it with the American system—a trend she finds especially troubling when the misinformation originates in the U.S.
- March 31 — CTV cancelled a planned weekly fact-checking segment during the Canadian federal election campaign after online pressure from supporters of Conservative leader Pierre Poilievre. The segment, hosted by journalist Rachel Gilmore, was abruptly canceled on March 31, 2025, following a social media backlash initiated by Sebastian Skamski, a senior campaign official for Poilievre, after her March 25 CTV segment aired. His tweet labeled Gilmore a "disgraced disinformation peddler" and was viewed over 400,000 times. During the Freedom Convoy in 2022, Gilmour reported that protestors had allegedly been involved in setting an apartment building on fire, first taping all the doors shut; although Ottawa police labelled this claim disinformation, Gilmour never published a retraction. CTV executives cited the "volume of pushback" as a distraction, despite internal emails praising Gilmore's performance and acknowledging the harassment campaign's bad-faith nature. Gilmore had previously faced coordinated online trolling in 2022 after Poilievre criticized her reporting on his opposition to COVID-19 vaccine mandates. She recently participated in a United Nations panel on digital threats faced by women in public life, where she discussed her experiences with harassment. The cancellation has drawn condemnation from press freedom advocates, who warn it sets a dangerous precedent for capitulating to political pressure campaigns.
- March 28 – Marissa Sollows, director of communications for the Financial and Consumer Services Commission of New Brunswick, issued warnings about a Facebook-based disinformation campaign featuring Mark Carney announcing a cryptocurrency solution in response to the Trump tariffs. It sometimes includes a complete deep fake interview with Rosie Barton.

=== 2026 ===
- 21 April – The Canadian Digital Media Research Network (CDMRN), coordinated by the Media Ecosystem Observatory (MEO), released Slopaganda: the inauthentic YouTube network selling secession to Albertans, an incident-response report identifying a coordinated network of 20 inauthentic YouTube channels targeting Albertan audiences. The channels had received nearly 40 million views and presented themselves as Albertan political commentary while promoting misleading claims about Alberta secession and annexation by the United States. Lead researcher Chris Ross said the network used templated scripts, AI-generated avatars, and paid voice actors, and that the report could not determine its origin or intent. A prominent Alberta separatist leader, Jeffrey Rath of Stay Free Alberta, said the annexation-focused channels were not affiliated with the independence movement.
- 22 April – Canada's National Observer reported that several of the network's presenters were voice actors based in the United States rather than in Alberta as their channels claimed, and identified one as Calgary radio host Matt Berry, whose audition tape had been used without his consent. The outlet also identified an Indiana-based voice actor using the pseudonym "Bartimus Prime," who said he had been paid to record both pro- and anti-Donald Trump scripts for different channels on the same day and showed ad-revenue screenshots of up to US$31,000 per month across multiple channels.
- 23 April – A CBC News and Radio-Canada investigation reported evidence linking several channels identified by the MEO to people in the Netherlands and to the use of hired presenters. It reported that two of the individuals identified had taken a course on creating anonymous "faceless" YouTube channels for passive income, and that several channels had subsequently been removed by YouTube.
- 29 April – Canadian Affairs reported that YouTube had removed 30 channels after reviewing the MEO report; as of that report, the channels Canadian Reporter and David Fraser remained online. MEO director Aengus Bridgman said further investigation was needed to determine whether the network was chiefly a monetization enterprise, a foreign-influence operation, or both.

== Bibliography ==
A

- @AdamKinzinger (November 22, 2023). "@KariLake @JoeBiden Original post" (Tweet) – via X (formerly Twitter).
- @Alethea_Aggiuq (March 26, 2014). "@TheEllenShow I am an Inuit seal meat eater, and my fur is ethical, humane. #sealfie vs. #selfie http://t.co/tI4c3NxbEY" (Tweet) – via Twitter.

B

- "Boston Globe retracts fabricated story on seal hunt". CBC News. April 15, 2005.
- Bridgman, Aengus; Merkley, Eric; Loewen, Peter John; Owen, Taylor; Ruths, Derek; Teichmann, Lisa; Zhilin, Oleg (2020). "The Causes and Consequences of COVID-19 Misperceptions: Understanding the Role of News and Social Media". Harvard Kennedy School Misinformation Review. 1 (3). doi:10.37016/mr-2020-028.
- Bridgman, Aengus; Merkley, Eric; Zhilin, Oleg; Loewen, Peter John; Owen, Taylor; Ruths, Derek (2021). Infodemic Pathways: Evaluating the Role That Traditional and Social Media Play in Cross-National Information Transfer. Frontiers in Political Science (Report). Vol. 3. doi:10.3389/fpos.2021.648646.
- Bridgman, Aengus; Lavigne, M.; Baker, M; Bergeron, T; Bohonos, D; Burton, A; McCoy, K (2022). Mis- and Disinformation During the 2021 Canadian Federal Election (PDF). Media Ecosystem Observatory (Report).

C

- Cain, Patrick; Semple, Jeff (October 29, 2019). "Closed Facebook groups where extremists thrive 'would curl your innards,' expert says". Global New.
- Canadian Affairs (April 29, 2026). "AI 'slopaganda' polluting Canada separatism conversation". Canadian Affairs.
- "Humane Society says it doesn't oppose Inuit seal hunt". Canadian Press. April 8, 2014 – via CBC News.
- "Bulletin: Fraud using Deepfakes". Canadian Anti-Fraud Centre. July 31, 2024 – via Royal Canadian Mounted Police and the Government of Canada.
- "Russian Funding of US and Canadian Political Influencers" (PDF). Canadian Digital Media Research Network (CDMRN). Archived from the original (PDF) on December 26, 2024.
- Canadian Digital Media Research Network; Media Ecosystem Observatory (April 21, 2026). Slopaganda: The Inauthentic YouTube Network Selling Secession to Albertans (Report).
- "Digital Citizen Initiative – Online disinformation and other online harms and threats". Department of Canadian Heritage. April 23, 2021.
- "Countering Disinformation: A Guidebook for Public Servants". May 16, 2024. Archived from the original on May 16, 2024.
- Childs, Ben (March 28, 2014). "Canadian Inuit post 'sealfies' in protest over Ellen DeGeneres' Oscar-night selfie". The Guardian. ISSN 0261-3077.
- "Deepfakes: A Real Threat to a Canadian Future". Canadian Security Intelligence Service (CSIS). Ottawa, Ontario, Canada. November 16, 2023 – via Government of Canada.
- "How to identify misinformation, disinformation, and malinformation" (PDF). Canadian Centre for Cyber Security (CCCS). February 23, 2022.
- Caulfield, Timothy (September 18, 2024). "Welcome to the Poilievre Conspiracy Theory Vortex | The Walrus". The Walrus.
- Charlevoix commitment on defending democracy from foreign threats (PDF) (Report). Charlevoix, Quebec: Group of 7. June 9, 2018. p. 2.
- Canadian Medical Association 2025 health and media annual tracking survey. Canadian Medical Association (CMA) (Report) (2 ed.). Ottawa. January 2025 – via Abacus Data.
- "Five takeaways about the health of Canada's information environment". Canadian Medical Association. January 23, 2025a.
- "Danielle Smith faces criticism over chemtrail comments at townhall". CityNews Calgary. October 1, 2024.
- Couts, Andrew. "Right-Wing Influencer Network Tenet Media Allegedly Spread Russian Disinformation". Wired. ISSN 1059-1028. Archived from the original on September 5, 2024.
- Le, Kathy (April 21, 2026). "Network of YouTube channels pushing U.S. annexation and Alberta secession narrative, report finds". CTV News.

D

- Concerns with misinformation online, 2023. Statistics Canada (Report). The Daily. December 20, 2023.
- Demchuk, Kait (October 15, 2015). "Hiding in plain sight: Putin's war in Ukraine". Atlantic Council.
- Dale, Daniel (March 12, 2025). "Fact check: Nine Trump false claims about Canada". CNN Politics.
- "Greening Earth Society". DeSmog. n.d.
- Assessing the Canadian information environment during the 2019 federal election (PDF). Digital Forensic Research Lab of the Atlantic Council (Report). March 22, 2024. p. 24.
- DFRLab (March 19, 2025). "An existential threat: Disinformation 'single biggest risk' to Canadian democracy". DFRLab.
- "How can society thrive in a digital age?". Digital Society Lab. 2020.
- @disorderedyyc (September 30, 2024). "Asked about chemtrails, Premier Smith suggests that "the US Department of Defense is spraying us". "If anyone is doing it, it's the US Department of Defense" Smith is pandering to the conspiracy theorists. #ableg #abpoli https://t.co/oZ3Ka79KjG" (Tweet) – via X (formerly Twitter).
- Dyer, Evan (March 22, 2025). "How Trump uses disinformation in his trade war with Canada". CBC News.

E

- Ejesiak, Kirt (May 8, 2005). "Animal rights vs. Inuit rights". The Boston Globe. Archived from the original on July 15, 2007.
- "EU-28 and G7 Regulations". EU DisinfoLab. June 19, 2019. Archived from the original on November 16, 2019.

F

- Fawcett-Atkinson, Marc (May 23, 2023). "Wildfire conspiracy theories spread faster than flames". Canada's National Observer: Climate News.
- Fawcett-Atkinson, Marc (June 17, 2024). "How wildfires expose Canada's climate disinformation problem". Canada's National Observer: Climate News.
- Fawcett-Atkinson, Marc (July 26, 2024). "The blaze in Jasper fueled a wider disinformation firestorm". Canada's National Observer: Climate News.
- Fawcett-Atkinson, Marc (November 5, 2024). "Alberta's carbon resolution has a grain of truth and a whole lot of '90s climate denial". Canada's National Observer.

G

- "G7 Rapid Response Mechanism - Canada.ca". 2019. Archived from the original on September 17, 2024.
- Annual Report (PDF). G7 Rapid Response Mechanism (Report). Germany. 2022. Archived from the original (PDF) on May 15, 2024.
- Glavin, Terry (March 14, 2017). "How Russia's attack on Freeland got traction in Canada". Macleans.ca.
- "Canada targeted in a new Chinese transnational repression campaign linked to 'Spamouflage'". Global Affairs Canada (GAC). January 31, 2025.
- "37th Parliament, 2nd Sessions Edited Hansard; Number 110 Contents". Publications: Debates: Committees of the House: Petitions: The Environment 1030. Parliament of Canada. June 3, 2003. Archived from the original on May 28, 2015.
- "Prime Minister announces additional support for Ukraine". Prime Minister of Canada. August 23, 2022.
- "'Chemtrails' theory has local believers". Guelph Mercury. March 5, 2011.

H

- Heer, Tej; Heath, Charlee; Girling, Kimberly; Bugg, Emma (May 2021). "Misinformation in Canada" (PDF). Evidence for Democracy Options.
- Hemmadi, Murad (January 29, 2019). "Federal government to announce $7 million in funding to fight disinformation online ahead of 2019 election". The Logic. Archived from the original on October 22, 2019.

I

- "Canada's anti-spam legislation". Innovation, Science and Economic Development Canada. July 15, 2024.
- "Canadian research is producing AI-powered algorithms to counter mis- and disinformation on social media". Canada Foundation for Innovation. January 12, 2024.
- "Canadian government funds media literacy research project to combat disinformation". IT World Canada News. June 9, 2023. Archived from the original on June 9, 2023.

J

- @TheJasonPugh (September 13, 2024). "Watch: "In response, today, the United States, United Kingdom and Canada are launching a joint diplomatic campaign to rally allies and partners around the world to join us in addressing the threat posed by RT and other machinery of Russian disinformation and covert influence." - https://t.co/7yvTpPl3IZ" (Tweet) – via X (formerly Twitter).
- Jiang, Kevin (November 9, 2023). "Vivek Ramaswamy wants to build a U.S.-Canada border wall". Toronto Star.

K

- Kolga, Marcus; Byers-Lane, Brett (October 23, 2019). "Trolling Trudeau - Fears of Foreign Interference in Canada". Macdonald-Laurier Institute.

L

- Lazer, David M. J.; Baum, Matthew A.; Benkler, Yochai; Berinsky, Adam J.; Greenhill, Kelly M.; Menczer, Filippo; Metzger, Miriam J.; Nyhan, Brendan; Pennycook, Gordon; Rothschild, David; Schudson, Michael; Sloman, Steven A.; Sunstein, Cass R.; Thorson, Emily A.; Watts, Duncan J.; Zittrain, Jonathan L. (March 9, 2018). "The science of fake news". Science. 359 (6380): 1094–1096. arXiv:2307.07903. Bibcode:2018Sci...359.1094L. doi:10.1126/science.aao2998. PMID 29590025.
- Leblanc, Daniel (January 25, 2019). "Trudeau lashes out at Facebook and other internet giants". The Globe and Mail. Archived from the original on December 11, 2023.
- LeBrun, Luke (September 8, 2024b). "I cover the far right for a living. This is why I wasn't surprised to find Canadians embedded in an alleged Russian propaganda scheme". Toronto Star.
- LeBrun, Luke (September 13, 2024a). What's behind Canada's outsized influence in the world of far-right misinformation. CBC Radio.
- LeBrun, Luke (October 1, 2024). "The Pentagon and NORAD Respond to Danielle Smith: Nope, We're Not Spraying Chemicals Over Alberta". PressProgress.
- LeBrun, Luke (April 1, 2025). "CTV Cancelled a Fact-Checking Segment in Response to Political Pressure From Pierre Poilievre's Conservatives". PressProgress.
- Lockhart, Angus; Laghaei, Mahtab; Andrey, Sam (August 2024). Survey of Online Harms in Canada 2024 (PDF). The DAIS (Report). p. 58. ISBN 978-1-77417-092-2.

M

- Mago, Shivani (October 18, 2024). "Month-old Canadian report flagged posts, news from 'Modi-aligned media' as 'foreign interference'". The Print.
- Major, Darren (March 24, 2025). "Elections Canada has been in touch with social media platforms about election misinformation". CBC News.
- Macdonald, David; Macdonald, Sonja (March 20, 2025). News deprivation: Canadian communities starving for local news (PDF) (Report). Canadian Centre for Policy Alternatives. p. 38.
- Mcdevitt, Neale (August 19, 2021). "McGill launches Canadian Election Misinformation Project". McGill Reporter.
- Anne-Marie Mediwake (host), Rachel Gilmore (guest) (March 25, 2025). Misinformation Already Spreading About Canada's Election. CTV Your Morning. Event occurs at 05:49.
- Murphy, Margi (June 28, 2022). "Pro-China Agents Posed as Activists to Protest US, Canada Mines". BNN Bloomberg. Bloomberg News. Archived from the original on August 17, 2022.
- Montgomery, Andrea; Melgar, Alejandro (April 22, 2026). "AI 'slopaganda' pushing Alberta separatism content: report". CityNews Calgary.

N * Wayne Nelson, Danielle Smith (September 28, 2024). Your Province. Your Premier. Global News.

- Noakes, Taylor; Paradis, Danielle (November 2, 2024). "Alberta Conservatives Pass Climate Denial Resolution 12 to Celebrate CO2 Pollution". DeSmog.

O

- Orr, Caroline (July 25, 2019a). "A new wave of disinformation emerges with anti-Trudeau hashtag". Canada's National Observer. Climate News.
- Orr, Caroline (July 18, 2019b). "Twitter bots boosted the trending #TrudeauMustGo hashtag". Canada's National Observer. Climate News.
- Owen, Taylor; Loewen, Peter John; Ruths, Derek; Bridgman, Aengus; Gorwa, Robert; MacLellan, Stephanie (2020). "Lessons in Resilience: Canada's Digital Media Ecosystem and the 2019 Election". Public Policy Forum.

P

- Paas-Lang, Christian; Young, Nora; Angelovski, Ivan (March 28, 2025). "Fake election news ads are luring people into investment schemes. We got some taken down". CBC News.
- Panetta, Alexander (November 23, 2023). "Right-wing U.S. media covered fiction as fact: A non-existent terrorist attack from Canada at Rainbow Bridge". CBC News.
- "Briefing" (PDF). February 26, 2019.
- "Well-known right-wing influencers duped to work for covert Russian operation, U.S. prosecutors say". PBS News. September 5, 2024.
- @PierrePoilievre] (July 7, 2022). "No wonder trust in the media is at an all-time low. One of Global News' so-called journalists decided to smear me & thousands of other Canadians because we criticized the federal government's unscientific & discriminatory vaccine mandates. My campaign's response to this attack. https://t.co/P1W4PTcswR" (Tweet) – via Twitter.
- Final Report. Foreign Interference Commission (Report). Public Inquiry Into Foreign Interference in Federal Electoral Processes and Democratic Institutions. Ottawa, Ontario, Canada. 2025. ISBN 978-0-660-75079-8.

R

- Rhode, Mackenzie (October 3, 2024). "Why Danielle Smith, Scott Moe and other politicians get caught up in chemtrails conspiracy". Calgary Herald. Archived from the original on October 2, 2024.
- Rodgers, Kathleen; Scobie, Willow (2015). "Sealfies, seals and celebs: expressions of Inuit resilience in the Twitter era" (PDF). Interface. 7 (1): 70–97.
- Roose, Kevin (June 8, 2019). "The Making of a YouTube Radical". The New York Times. ISSN 0362-4331.

S

- Saba, Rosa (March 20, 2025). "Local news coverage in Canada in steep decline, inviting misinformation: report". Canadian Press – via Prince George Citizen.
- Schmunk, Rhianna (September 13, 2024). "RT's work extends beyond propaganda to covert intelligence operations, U.S. warns". CBC News.
- "Scott Jones, Head-designate, Canadian Centre for Cyber Security and Deputy Chief, IT Security, CSE". Communications Security Establishment (Press release). June 12, 2018. Archived from the original on June 28, 2018. "The Cyber Centre will be a single unified source of expert advice, guidance, services and support on cyber security for government, critical infrastructure owners and operations, the private sector and the Canadian public."
- Seli, Yeshi (October 20, 2024). "Canada's RRM report claims Indian media shaped negative narratives about Trudeau". The New Indian Express.
- Shen, Nono (November 1, 2023). "China critic says he's the target of deepfake 'spamouflage' attack by Beijing". CTV News. The Canadian Press. Archived from the original on November 9, 2023.
- Skamski (March 25, 2025). "In a shocking new low for @CTVNews, they are having this disgraced disinformation peddler lie directly to their viewers under the guise of "news". The Liberal media will do anything to ensure a fourth Liberal term. Remember that the next time they "fact check" Conservatives!" (Tweet). Twitter.
- Szeto, Eric; Angelovski, Ivan; Paas-Lang, Christian; Pearson, Jordan; Yates, Jeff; De Rosa, Nicholas (April 23, 2026). "Dutch YouTube creators behind Alberta separatist videos getting millions of views". CBC News.

T

- Courtney Theriault [@@cspotweet] (May 9, 2023). ""Take Facebook and throw that damn thing in the garbage." Yellowhead County Mayor Wade Williams among those municipal officials urging people to get proper information about the wildfires and to stop spreading the misinformation and gossip. #yeg #yyc #ableg #abwildfire https://t.co/rwFdA2sXCX" (Tweet) – via Twitter.
- Tunney, Catherine (October 23, 2023). "China linked to propaganda campaign targeting Trudeau, Poilievre, says Global Affairs". CBC News. Archived from the original on May 9, 2024.

U

- Threats and Opportunities of Digital Technologies: Women in the Public Eye (CSW69 Side Event). UN Web TV. March 10, 2025.

V

- @VivekGRamaswamy (October 19, 2023). "It's not "Build-the-Wall" anymore. It's Build *Both* Walls. I visited the Northern & Southern Borders this month. This isn't a technical challenge, the country that put a man on the moon can fix this. It's a question of political will" (Tweet) – via X (formerly Twitter).
- Vraga, Emily K.; Bode, Leticia (January 2, 2020). "Defining Misinformation and Understanding its Bounded Nature: Using Expertise and Evidence for Describing Misinformation". Political Communication. 37 (1): 136–144. doi:10.1080/10584609.2020.1716500. ISSN 1058-4609.

W

- Wenzel, George (June 1, 1991). Animal Rights, Human Rights: Ecology, Economy, and Ideology in the Canadian Arctic. Toronto, Ont Buffalo, N.Y: University of Toronto Press. ISBN 978-0-8020-6890-3.
- Wherry, Aaron (October 2, 2024). "Nav Canada has no record of chemtrails conversation with Alberta government". The Globe and Mail.
- White, Rory (April 22, 2026). "Researchers uncover fake Canadian YouTube channels pushing Alberta separatism and US annexation". Canada's National Observer.
- "Canada: Rachel Gilmore Faces Escalating Harassment Amid Continued Attacks on Women Journalists". Coalition For Women in Journalism. February 26, 2025.
