= COVID-19 misinformation in Canada =

This timeline includes entries on the spread of COVID-19 misinformation and conspiracy theories related to the COVID-19 pandemic in Canada. This includes investigations into the origin of COVID-19, and the prevention and treatment of COVID-19 which is caused by the virus SARS-CoV-2. Social media apps and platforms, including Facebook, TikTok, Telegram, and YouTube, have contributed to the spread of misinformation. The Canadian Anti-Hate Network (CAHN) reported that conspiracy theories related to COVID-19 began on "day one". CAHN reported on March 16, 2020, that far-right groups in Canada were taking advantage of the climate of anxiety and fear surrounding COVID, to recycle variations of conspiracies from the 1990s, that people had shared over shortwave radio. COVID-19 disinformation is intentional and seeks to create uncertainty and confusion. But most of the misinformation is shared online unintentionally by enthusiastic participants who are politically active.

== Overview ==
The 2016 United Kingdom European Union membership referendum and the 2016 United States presidential election highlighted the way in which digital technologies, such as "social media and microblogging platforms" had changed the way in which people consumed and responded to the news, bringing in the period of post-truth.

Six Canadian researchers who undertook a large-scale detailed case study of Canada based on a "massive data set of Canadian Twitter users" found that most COVID-19 misinformation shared by Canadian Twitter accounts, was retweeted from accounts in the United States. They found that the infodemic of misinformation, disinformation and conspiracy theories, which includes medical advice from unreliable sources, and claims that the severity and spread of COVID-19 had been exaggerated, did not stop at national borders. Canadians who had more exposure to United States-based Twitter accounts, were more likely to post COVID-19 misinformation and misperceptions. COVID-19 disinformation is intentional and seeks to create uncertainty and confusion. But most of the misinformation is shared online unintentionally by enthusiastic participants who are politically active, in what is called the "paradox of participation".

- Recycled conspiracy theories

One the early conspiracy theories was that COVID-19 was a United Nations' plan to eliminate about 90% of the global population, which is a variation on the UN Agenda 21 conspiracy theories spread by the John Birch Society, Glenn Beck, Ted Cruz in the 2010s. On his TV and radio broadcasts, Beck cautioned that the 1992 United Nations Agenda 21 sustainability plan was a disguised conspiracy to cut the world population by 85%, and a move towards totalitarian "government control on a global level". (Note: The United Nations Agenda 21, non-binding action plan of the United Nations with regard to sustainable development was a product of the Earth Summit (UN Conference on Environment and Development) held in Rio de Janeiro, Brazil, in 1992.)

== 2019 ==
The Digital Citizen Initiative was launched by Canadian Heritage to combat online disinformation by encouraging critical thinking. In September 2019, CBC/Radio-Canada joined the Trusted News Initiative, intended to develop tools to assist news industry partners in "moving quickly and collectively to undermine disinformation before it can take hold."

== 2020 ==
In the early months of the pandemic, 96% of Canadians viewed content that they thought was either "misleading, false or inaccurate".

- January: One of the first and most "pervasive" conspiracy theories linked 5G telecommunications technology to the coronavirus, according to Canadian Security Intelligence Service (CSIS) documents Global News obtained under the Access to Information Act. The CSIS documents focused on national security specifically investigating authoritarian states and extremist groups that were spreading COVID-19 disinformation. FullFact fact checker had already been writing about 5G conspiracies long before COVID, but they started to see stories linking coronavirus to 5G in early January in a 5G Facebook group page, falsely claiming that 5G was first installed in Wuhan where it caused a modification in the virus. A January 2020 article, since deleted, in an "obscure Belgian newspaper" linked 5G to the coronavirus. A March 28, 2020 YouTube video since-deleted by a preacher, falsely claimed that he was a Vodafone whistle-blower with insider knowledge on links between 5G and the coronavirus. The video went viral and continues to be shared on other platforms. According to the fact-checker, the success of this video, which made the false claims all the more dangerous, was attributed to the pastor's eloquence, his claim that God had blessed him with a gift, and his claim to insider knowledge that could not be verified. The webpage of "Action 4 Canada", an Islamophobic, anti-LGBTQ conspiracy group which is associated with the 2022 Canada convoy protest, includes misinformation related to health consequences of 5G technology.
- January: The COVID-19 lab leak theory on the origins of virus SARS-CoV-2, which often referenced the Wuhan Institute of Virology as the source, was considered to be a "conspiracy theory built on misinformation and fear", from the pandemic's earliest days. When Yuri Deigin, a Russian-born Canadian scientist and biotech entrepreneur, first read about the hypothesis in January, he too believed it was a conspiracy theory. As he set out to prove it was wrong using "cold, hard scientific facts," he compiled an original body of research that left him more open to the hypothesis. He published his 16,000-word essay in April in English on Medium and it was either "ignored" or "disparaged". Geopolitics combined with conspiracy theories entangled COVID's origin story. The lab leak theory was used by politicians to shift the blame away from their own "catastrophic" pandemic management. In March, US President Donald Trump and Mike Pompeo, the secretary of state said that the virus originated in Wuhan lab and referred to it as the China virus. In her August 2021 book Elaine Dewar connected some of the "geopolitical interests to the spin" behind the theories on the virus' origins.
- January 25: Kyle Bass, a manager of a hedge fund in Texas, and a critic of China, falsely claimed in a Twitter post that two married Chinese spies had sent stolen pathogens to China's Wuhan Institute of Virology from a high security infectious disease Canadian lab. As misinformation spread online based on a distortion of a CBC report, Fuyuki Kurasawa who is the director of York University's Global Digital Citizenship Lab said that coronavirus disinformation is "creating a 'social panic' online".
- January 27: By Monday, January 27, the "baseless" "Stolen from Canadian lab" claim had been shared 6,000 times on one Facebook conspiracy theory page, and had over 350,000 views on the social media app TikTok, which is Chinese-owned. CBC reported that the claim Bass made had "no factual basis".
- January 30: False health advice on preventing and treating COVID-19 was widely circulated on WhatsApp and Facebook in Canada, as well as in Pakistan and India.
- March: According to Anatoliy Gruzd, Canada Research Chair in Privacy Preserving Digital Technologies, there was a significant uptake in the use of social media starting in March, when the pandemic officially started and lockdowns began to be implemented. People used social media as a way of responding to social isolation by connecting with family, friends, and coworkers, and to keep informed on COVID.
- March 16:
  - Peter Downing, head of the western separatist movement Wexit Canada, now known as the Maverick Party, who was also one of the organizers of the February 20, anti-lockdown "Walk for Freedom Alberta" rally at the Alberta Legislature Building in Edmonton, Alberta, posted on Twitter that school and daycare shutdowns are a "ploy" to shut down the economy. The federal government had failed to do this through its "climate change scare". "Don't fall for the scare." In January, Downing's Wexit party purchased anti-Trudeau billboards in Alberta accusing Prime Minister Justin Trudeau of "ISIS terrorist reintegration", "tax theft", "economic sabotage", "foreign interference" and "ethics violations. The signs were removed because of concerns of violating the Charter"s anti-incitement clause in regards to "hate speech" and "offensive ads."
- March 18: At a press conference, US President Donald Trump defended his reference to SARS-CoV-2 and COVID-19 as the "Chinese virus", a term that has been associated with anti-Asian racism and xenophobia.
- April 3: A preprint by Caly et al. about ivermectin as a possible treatment for COVID-19 was published. Experts questioned the methodological methods used. In response, the FDA issued a warning and the authors published an advisory saying, "Finally, it is critically important to remember that ivermectin as an antiviral is in a very early phase – under no circumstances should self-medication be considered without the guidance of a qualified physician, and especially not using therapeutics designed for veterinary purposes!" A pre-print does not have the same validity as a peer-reviewed paper published in a scholarly journal. Barcelona Institute for Global Health scientists said that the decision by governments in Latin America to use invermectin was based on the analysis in this pre-print. Both invermectin and hydroxychloroquine, which have not been proven by clinical trials, are "widely available and relatively cheap" in most countries.
- April 7: Steven Guilbeault, Minister of Canadian Heritage, announced the Digital Citizen Initiative's $3 million dollar Digital Citizen Contribution Program to help combat COVID-19 misinformation.
- April 14: The origins of the conspiracy theory claiming falsely that Bill Gates would use microchips in a future COVID-19 vaccine to track people, can be traced to an April 6 question posed by a conservative White House news correspondent that was amplified by Fox News Laura Ingraham on April 8, according to Annenberg Public Policy Center's nonprofit FactCheck.org.
- April 29: An unsolicited April 29 8-page article, "How the Chinese Communist Party Endangered the World", by the anti-Chinese Communist Party newspaper The Epoch Times, containing misinformation about the origin of the virus, was distributed to some Canadian, American and Australian customers.
- April: Statistics Canada launched the Canadian Perspectives Survey Series (CPSS), to track the experiences of Canadians during the COVID-19 pandemic.
- May 11: A Canada-wide online survey of 1,500 adults focused on "digital hygiene" and asked how often respondents had encountered misinformation related to COVID-19.
- May 2: During the first months of the pandemic, misinformation superspreaders like anti-vaxxer Robert F. Kennedy Jr., Roger Stone, and Fox News' Laura Ingraham contributed to replacing George Soros with Bill Gates as the prime "bogeyman" of the right. By May 2, 2020, COVID-19-related misinformation about Gates shared by conspiracy theorists, including anti-vaxxers and "science deniers", was "among the most widespread of all coronavirus falsehoods".
- June 23: Reuters fact checkers said that Judy Mikovits widely-shared 2-minute video clip on social media in which she made the claim that the first dose of the COVID-19 vaccine would kill 50 million Americans if there was a vaccine-mandate, was unfounded. Mikovits presented COVID-19 pandemic-related conspiracy theories half-hour long in a May video, Plandemic: The Hidden Agenda Behind Covid-19, that was widely circulated before being removed from YouTube and other social media sites.
- July:
  - A study out of McGill University on how COVID-19 misinformation impacts public health, raised concerns at the alarming speed with which COVID-19-related conspiracy theories were spreading across Canada. In mid-July protesters gathered outside the office of the Premier of Quebec, Francois Legault with signs saying "Long live freedom without a mask", and "My body, my choice." The study said that the conspiracy theories were widely spread on Facebook, for example where groups such as "Against mandatory mask-wearing in Quebec" attracted tens of thousands of members. The accompanying photo in the Canadian Press article described how tech companies were already working quickly to remove Judy Mikovits' Plandemic video from their platforms as she was promoting a "questionable, false and potentially dangerous coronavirus theories".
- July 20 to 26: Canadian Perspectives Survey Series (CPSS) undertook an online survey from July 20 to 26, 2020 on "Information Sources Consulted During the Pandemic". The online CPSS focused on the kind of information Canadians over 15 in ten provinces found online to answer their questions about COVID-19. The survey included questions on information verification and sharing.
  - Anatoliy Gruzd, Canada Research Chair said in an interview that there was already a group of very organized and motivated anti-vaccination communities, including some based on conspiracy theories about the vaccines. This included false claims of a microchip built into the vaccine, that could control and track anyone who received the vaccine.
  - A Institute for Strategic Dialogue (ISD) report on QAnon said that Canada ranked second after the United States in the number of Tweets that mentioned QAnon in 2018, and remained in the top five list from 2019 through 2020. Other top content producers for QAnon included the United Kingdom, Australia and Russia.
- September: According to Queen's University's professor and Global Network on Extremism and Technology fellow Amarnath Amarasingam, when Prime Minister Trudeau used the term "reset" in his September 2020 United Nations speech referring to how the pandemic provided an opportunity for countries to "reimagine economic systems" and respond better to "poverty and climate change", QAnon online messaging boards lit up as they interpreted this to mean that he was a key player in the Great Reset conspiracy theory.
- November 20: The Conservative Party of Canada (CPC) MP for Carleton, Pierre Poilievre, who previously served in the cabinet of Premiership of Stephen Harper and is Opposition critic for finance in Parliament, posted a "Stop the Great Reset" petition online which garnered tens of thousands of signatures in response to Trudeau's "reset" comment. Poilievre called on Canadians to protect freedom fighting back" against "global financial elites" who are "pushing" their "agenda" by "preying on the fears and desperation of people to impose their power grab". The Toronto Star said Poilievre was "giving oxygen" to conspiracy theorists.

== 2021 ==
- February 2:
  - The World Health Organization (WHO) published their report on managing infodemics, which included understand the origins, evolution and spread of information, identifying "actors, influencers, platforms and channels", and how misinformation affects how people behave.
  - Based on the CPSS July 2020 survey on "Information Sources Consulted During the Pandemic", Statistics Canada found that almost all Canadians had seen COVID-19 misinformation online.
- February 14: In a Public Health Agency of Canada (PHAC) statement, Canada's Chief Medical Officer, Dr. Theresa Tam, called on Canadians to equip themselves to counter COVID-19 disinformation and misinformation by developing and using skills related to digital literacy and the media. This includes the ability to recognize misinformation. Sites that spread disinformation and misinformation use official looking logos and headlines, and explicitly attempt to exploit the anxiety and fear associated with the pandemic, according to the statement. They aim to erode trust in institutions and in our communities and to weaken social cohesion. Dr. Tam recommended SPOTFakeNews.ca, ScienceUpFirst, and [MediaSmarts].
- February 15: WHO Director General, Tedros Adhanom Ghebreyesus, said that the infodemic of COVID-19 medical disinformation and misinformation was also a global public health emergency. He said that, "Fake news spreads faster and more easily than this virus, and is just as dangerous."
- March: A Chinese Canadian National Council (CCNC) report funded by the Canadian government released in March, found that starting in the first months of the pandemic and continuing throughout, there was a surge in anti-Asian hate crimes in Canada fuelled by COVID-19 misinformation and disinformation. One of the most disturbing findings was the number of physical assaults targeting children and the elderly, in which they were spat upon.
- April 14: By April 2021, a once little known church of 400 congregants, GraceLife near Edmonton, Alberta, became a "flashpoint" in the province's "battle against COVID-19". James Coates, GraceLife's pastor since in 2010, studied at John MacArthur's "The Master's Seminary" theological school in Los Angeles, California. Much of GraceLife's theological foundation was laid at the Seminary. (Note: Grace Church's founder, John MacArthur, is one the "most successful evangelical preachers" in the United States. His megachurch, Grace Community Church in Sun Valley, Los Angeles, has 7,000 congregants. MacArthur, who had followed public health guidelines during the first weeks of their implementation, changed his approach by April 28, 2020. He began to echo the conservative media and President Donald Trump, saying that COVID-19 was just a flu that the media was "overhyping". He said it was a government ploy to control Christians. The data were wrong regarding the number of people who had died from COVID.) (Note: MacArthur held indoor services with thousands in attendance in defiance of public health orders. In an August 30, 2020 sermon he told his congregation that Satan was behind a virus of deception that he had let loose in the world.) By June 2020, Coates had changed his approach to COVID, saying his initial reaction of compliance had been mistaken. When Alberta Premier Jason Kenney referred to COVID as an 'influenza' that normally only leads to death in those who are already sick and elderly, Coates shifted his approach. By February 2021, GraceLife posted a message on its website, in which church leaders said the science supporting the COVID-19 public health restrictions was "suspect and selective." They cautioned that, "[b]y the time the so-called 'pandemic' is over, if it is ever permitted to be over, Albertans will be utterly reliant on government, instead of free, prosperous, and independent."
- May: The CCCA was founded by Ira Bernstein, Jennifer Hibberd, a dentist and David Ross, who is an accountant. (Note: The anti-vaccine Canadian Covid Care Alliance (CCCA) was founded by Ira Bernstein, Jennifer Hibberd, a dentist and David Ross, who is an accountant in c. May 2021. The CCCA invited doctors and scientists to become new members. The CCCA promotes the use of the drug used on animals to treat parasites, ivermectin as a treatment for COVID-19, in spite of "overwhelming research" demonstrating that it does not work. CCCA video containing false claims about vaccine safety, "The Pfizer Inoculations For COVID-19 – More Harm Than Good" was viewed over 800,000 times. By March 2022, the Ontario College of Physicians was investigating Bernstein.)
- May 13: In a UBC Medical Journal article debunking myths about suicide rates during the pandemic, University of British Columbia's assistant clinical professor, Tyler Black, a psychiatrist who works with children and adolescents, reported that there was no increase in child and adolescent suicides during the pandemic.
- May 14: A letter signed by Canadian epidemiologist and 17 other was published in Science calling for additional research on both hypotheses on the origins of SARS-CoV-2—zoonotic spillover—the virus spilled over from animals or was accidentally released in a lab. The scientists found that the 300-page WHO report, released in March 2021, did not provide enough evidence to rule out either the hypothesis that the virus spilled over from animals, or the idea that it was accidentally released from a laboratory.
- June: In a Royal Society of Canada 54-page report by the University of Toronto's infectious disease expert, Tara Moriarty, on excess all cause mortality in Canada between February and November 2020, concluded that COVID-19-related deaths in certain provinces had been under-reported.
- July 8: The Canadian Covid Care Alliance, which was co-founded by Ira Bernstein, was calling for doctors and scientists to become new members. The CCCA promotes the use of the drug used on animals to treat parasites, ivermectin, as a treatment for COVID-19, in spite of "overwhelming research" demonstrating that it does not work. By March 2022, Bernstein was being investigated by the Ontario College of Physicians.
- July: Iris Communications, an independent strategic communications company published their final report "Mapping & pre-empting COVID-19 disinformation in Canada" in which they identified nine primary communities in Canadian social media. The Twitter network in which COVID-19 was mentioned included Right wing, Progressive, Alberta, Ontario, British Columbia, Quebecois and Government clusters. The cluster that posted most often about COVID-19 was the anti-Liberal cluster. The Right-Wing cluster contributed high volumes of COVID-19 misinformation. While misinformation originated in the US, the People's Party of Canada and its key political figures dominated the Canadian cluster.
- August: Health Canada began to receive reports that some Canadians were using veterinary ivermectin, which has a much higher dose than the prescription drug ivermectin to treat parasitic worms in humans. The first warning was issued advising Canadians that side effects of taking the medication intended for large animals included seizures and even death.
- August 3: On August 10 Snopes rated a widely shared video "Canadian Court victory proves Covid-19 is a hoax and all restrictions have now been dropped" as false. Reuters also fact-checked the video clip, an interview with Pat King, on a show hosted by Stew Peters, who is known for his coronavirus disinformation and other conspiracy theories. In the video, King, falsely claimed that COVID-19 restrictions had been lifted in Alberta on July 28, 2021, as a result of a subpoena he had issued to Alberta's chief medical officer of health (CMOH), Dr. Deena Hinshaw, in which she failed to prove that "Covid-19 Virus exists". King had represented himself before a Justice of the Peace, who dismissed King's subpoena. In a Justice Centre for Constitutional Freedoms (JCCF) explainer, the JCCF said that it was unclear that King fully understood the legal process in which he was involved. According to Snopes, King was charged and fined for violating a COVID-19 order under the Public Health Act. He didn't win; he had to pay a fine, and "COVID-19 is not a hoax." Some public health restrictions had been lifted in Alberta because the adult vaccination rate in the province reached the medical experts' goal of 70%. In a Canadian Anti-Hate Network (CAHN) article, which described the 2022 anti-vaccine mandate 2022 anti-vaccine mandate convoy protests, as a "vehicle for the far right", King was listed as one of the fund-raisers.
- October 1: University of Toronto's professor of psychiatry and pharmacology, Roger McIntyre, the lead author of an October 1, 2021 Journal of the Royal Society of Medicine report on strategies for suicide reduction during the COVID-19 pandemic, said that the suicide mortality rate in Canada decreased by a "remarkable" 32% in the first year of the pandemic—March 2019 to February 2021—compared to the March 2018 to February 2020, in spite "isolating lockdowns" and a sharp increase in unemployment. This represents Canada's "lowest suicide mortality rate" since about 2010. McIntyre said that the results of their study show that public policies can impact suicide rates and Canadians need to rethink policies based on what they learned during the pandemic. The report credited the federal governments' Canadian Emergency Response Benefit (CERB), the Canadian Emergency Student Benefit, as well the Canadian Mortgage and Housing Corporation "mortgage forbearance" for contributing to the decrease.
- November:
  - The number of members of a Facebook group that spread COVID-19 misinformation—Canada Unity —rose from 32,000 to 40,500 in a month, on Telegram. "Vaccine Choice Canada" followers increased from about 14, 700 to 15, 700; "Unvaxxed Canada", which had 750 members, spawned about 15 regional groups.
  - Toronto, Ontario physician and cofounder of Canadian Covid Care Alliance, Ira Bernstein, launched Canadian Covid Telehealth, at the address of his Toronto practice, as a "covert prescription network" where he and his colleagues could prescribe ivermectin. In a November video announcing the creation of Canadian Covid Telehealth, Bernstein admitted that Health Canada has not approved the drug for use against COVID-19. He said, without evidence, that Health Canada and the regulators were not basing their claims against the use of ivermictin on "any credible science."
- November 3: The College of Physicians and Surgeons of Ontario (CPSO) took Dr. Celeste Jean Thirlwell, Dr. Rochagne Kilian, Dr. Mary Elizabeth O'Connor, and Dr. Mark Raymond Trozzi to court over their issuance of testing and vaccine exemptions. It was alleged by the CPSO that the exemptions were sold by some doctors using the website Enable Air, which calls the vaccine certificate a "fascist document". One of the doctors described the "so-called" COVID-19 vaccinations as "gene therapy experiments" that were "being administered to humanity without informed consent". In May 2022, the Divisional Court rejected one of the accused doctor's request to prevent access to their OHIP filings as part of the investigation. An additional fine of about $8,000 was added. The Court filings during this case revealed a string of allegations submitted by the College including fees of up to $300 for the exemptions. The filings also revealed allegations that the doctor's motivation for providing exemptions was not related to concerns for the individual health of patients but was rooted in an ideology related to the response of the state to the pandemic. The Court said that the only way to understand the doctor's references to Australia gassing its citizens, that states are using the pandemic to kill 15% of its own citizens, 50% of vaccinated will die, and the references to Nazis, is through an ideological perspective based in conspiracy theories. The court record establishes that, at the material time, Dr. Kilian appropriately assessed each patient and documented their concerns regarding potential adverse vaccine reactions, a conclusion corroborated by the expert witness's review of her patient records. The court record indicates that Dr. Kilian charged a flat fee of $80 per consultation—a cost borne privately by each patient.
- November 15: Ontario MPP Randy Hillier falsely claimed on his Facebook page that Public Health Ontario (PHO) had undertaken investigations into "37 possible deaths" caused by COVID-19 vaccines, according to a 2021 Global News article on the role of COVID-19 misinformation in "radicalizing Canadians".
- November 21: A CBC News article on misinformation in the courts, reported an increase in COVID-19 related court cases in 2021. (Note: The CBC News article received support from Journalists for Human Rights' Misinformation Project with funding from the McConnell Foundation, the Rossy Foundation and the Trottier Foundation.) Since March 2020 "church leaders, business owners and others" have challenged Alberta's public health restrictions in the province's court system. In 2021, there was a shift towards civil cases, with 25 separate cases related to COVID-19 restrictions enforcement. The director of Ontario Tech University's Centre on Hate, Bias and Extremism, Barbara Perry, said the momentum behind the court challenges are similar to those brought forward by the "anti-authority movement". The goal is the same, "to tie up the legal system." With COVID-19, these court cases are "also tying up public health authorities" which "threatens their ability to do their work" protecting the majority of people who accept restrictions "to halt the flow and spread of COVID." CAHN's Kurt Phillips also sees a similarity with the sovereign citizen movement, who used "nuisance lawsuits". Phillips said there has been an escalation in the use of these documents that Donald Netolitzky described as pseudolaws. The use of pseudolaw documents is a common tactic of conspiracy theorists, sovereign citizens, Freeman on the land, and vexatious litigants. According to Phillips, they resembled magic, as those who use them believe that if you said certain words in the right order in court, you could win your case. Sovereign citizens and others who use pseudolaws believe they "are or should be immune from government laws" which include public health laws.
- December 16: A December 21, 2021 Globe and Mail article reported that Conservative Party Lethbridge MP Rachael Thomas was spreading incorrect information about COVID-19 variants and vaccines by asserting in her December 16th video posted to Facebook that there were more hospitalized vaccinated people than unvaccinated; that taking a daily rapid test was safer than getting vaccinated; and that vaccines did not protect against Omicron. University of Alberta professor Timothy Caulfield, who was interviewed for the Globe article, said that Thomas claims that her "perspective is scientifically definitive" when in reality her statements have no scientific merit. For example, in mid-December in Alberta, while only 20% were unvaccinated, they represent 67% of COVID-related hospitalizations. Caulfield is a Canada Research Chair in Health Law and Policy who has focused on the real dangers of "misinformation as one of the great challenges of our time." In the December video, Thomas claimed that she and other who choose to not get vaccinated, were victims of Canadians who are not respecting their "freedom and personal choice". Caulfield said that Thomas does not understand "rights and freedoms in a liberal democracy" and that choices "have consequences". He said that Thomas' actions were not "noble" and that her messaging caused "great harm" to Canadians by advocating that people not get vaccinated. This misinformation leads to vaccine hesitancy.

== 2022 ==
- January 3: A 40-minute long video containing false claims about vaccine safety that was released by the anti-vaccine organization, the Canadian Covid Care Alliance (CCCA)—"The Pfizer Inoculations For COVID-19 – More Harm Than Good"—on Rumble, a Canadian video-sharing website, was viewed over 800,000 times. Agence France-Presse's AFP Fact Check debunked five false claims in the video.
- January 7: Allegations were made by the by College of Physicians and Surgeons of Ontario (CPSO) in late 2021 against four defendants, Ontario physicians, Rochagne Kilian, Mary O'Connor, Mark Trozzi and Patrick Phillips, that they "issued false medical exemptions for the COVID-19 vaccine". At their January 7, 2022, hearing before Ontario Superior Court of Justice, Edward Morgan, both Dr Kilian and Mary O'Connor showed up for the Zoom meeting. Mary O'Connor was represented by her lawyer Michael Swinwood. Dr Kilian's matter was rescheduled after her lawyer, Rocco Galati, was hospitalised and in intensive care with an undisclosed illness. During the hearing, Swinwood claimed that the COVID-19 pandemic was a "planned exercise in population control", and that the restrictions in place in Canada were "akin to Nazi Germany regulations". Swinwood's defence included anti-vaccine rhetoric and conspiracy theories.
- February: On Twitter, Tyler Black challenged the US-based group of physicians called the "Urgency of Normal" for promoting COVID-19-related "false and misleading information" including a claim that youth suicide rates increased during the pandemic.
- January 18: A Global News investigation revealed links between Canadian doctors who share COVID-19 misinformation.
- January 19: In response to the Global News report, Ontario Health Minister Christine Elliott called on the College of Physicians and Surgeons of Ontario (CPSO) to "put an end" to the unacceptable behaviour of doctors in that province who were spreading COVID-19 misinformation.
- January 24: In a press conference on Monday, Saskatchewan's premier Scott Moe said that the data in a Royal Society of Canada report by an infectious disease expert, Tara Moriarty, that was peer-reviewed by David Fisman and David Naylor—who are among the most prominent epidemiologists in Canada— was "nothing more than misinformation and it should be challenged. He said the report was "nothing short of some of the most egregious misinformation I've seen throughout this pandemic."
- February 24: Dr. Fulford denied that the $1,000 donation to the Canada convoy protest, listed under her name, was made by her, according to an article in The Hamilton Spectator. The Spectator said that Dr. Fulford had been outspoken about her views in which she questioned COVID-19 measures such as lockdowns, vaccine mandates, school closures, and masking for children in school.
- February: The CPSO said in a statement that they were investigating over forty physicians because they were promoting misinformation. At that time seven of these had lost their medical licenses.
- February 22: A report by a group of researchers at Stanford University, listed various groups of COVID-19 misinformation influencers such as long-standing anti-vaccine, wellness & lifestyle, pseudomedical (PMI), conspiracy theory, right-leaning political, and medical freedom influencers.
- March 5: In an email to the Globe and Mail, the University of Alberta's Timothy Caulfield, who is a Canada Research Chair in health law and policy, cautioned that when doctors and scientists, who are a "trusted source", spread misinformation, the effects are very damaging. They become influential by answering complex questions with false claims and simple answers that people who are tired of the lengthy pandemic want to hear. Caulfied said that these professionals are forming associations of deniers, and are capturing the "narrative" by saying that their contested views on science are simply "facts". Some are using their influence to "sell vaccine exemption cards" and to push their treatments. Caulfield is calling on the colleges of physicians to do more to protect the public.
- March 6: A Globe and Mail article said that a "small number" of Canadian physicians sharing COVID-19 misinformation were contributing to the erosion of trust in Canadian officials and institutions, including the nation's healthcare system.
- March 8: Simon Fraser University's Carmen Celestini, with the Disinformation Project said that COVID-19 misinformation has been replaced with misinformation about the Russian invasion of Ukraine on some anti-vaccine mandate pro-convoy online forums.

== See also ==
- COVID-19 misinformation
- COVID-19 misinformation by governments
- COVID-19 misinformation by the United States
- COVID-19 misinformation in the Philippines
- A timeline of misinformation and disinformation in Canada
