= ChinaAngVirus disinformation campaign =

US military anti-vax COVID-19 propaganda attack

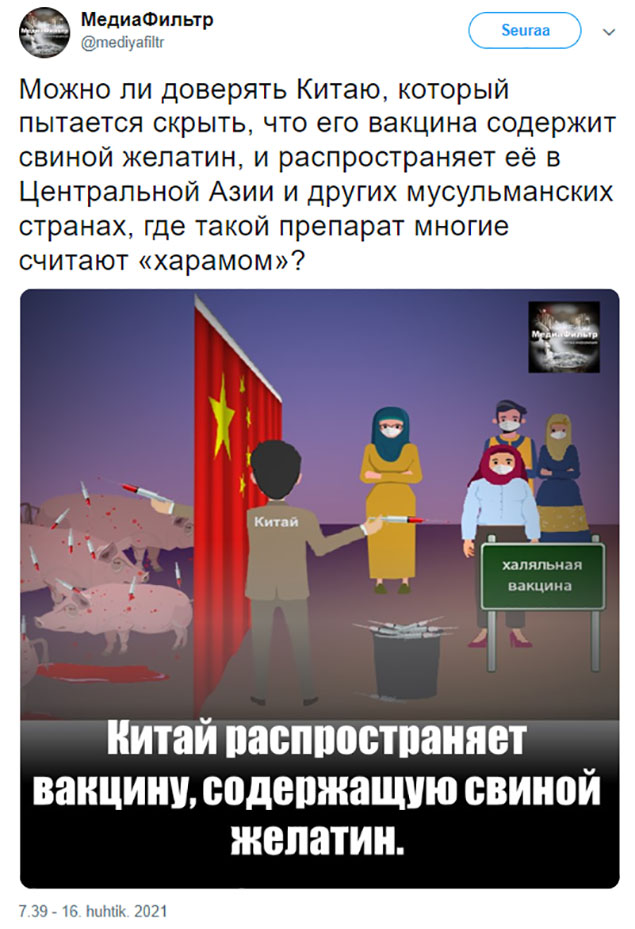
A Russian-language disinformation post targeting Central Asian and Muslim countries. It falsely claims that Chinese vaccines contain pork gelatin and are thus haram.

The #ChinaAngVirus disinformation campaign (transl. #ChinaIsTheVirus) was a covert Internet anti-vaccination propaganda and disinformation campaign conducted by the United States Department of Defense at the height of the COVID-19 pandemic from the spring of 2020 to the spring of 2021, to dissuade Filipino, Central Asian, and Middle Eastern citizens from receiving Sinovac Biotech's CoronaVac vaccine and from using other Chinese COVID-19 medical supplies. The propaganda campaign used at least 300 fake accounts on Twitter, Facebook, Instagram, and other social media websites meant to look like local internet users.

A Reuters report published in June 2024 uncovered the operation and interviewed U.S. Department of Defense officials who confirmed the deliberate measures of the propaganda campaign. Reuters said the U.S. campaign was designed to "counter what it perceived as China's growing influence in the Philippines" and was prompted by the "[fear] that China's COVID diplomacy and propaganda could draw other Southeast Asian countries, such as Cambodia and Malaysia, closer to Beijing".

Public reporting of the propaganda campaign prompted lawmakers in the Congress of the Philippines to open an investigation into the harm and damages caused by the disinformation campaign, the culpability of the U.S. military in breaking international law, and possible legal actions against responsible parties.

== Background ==
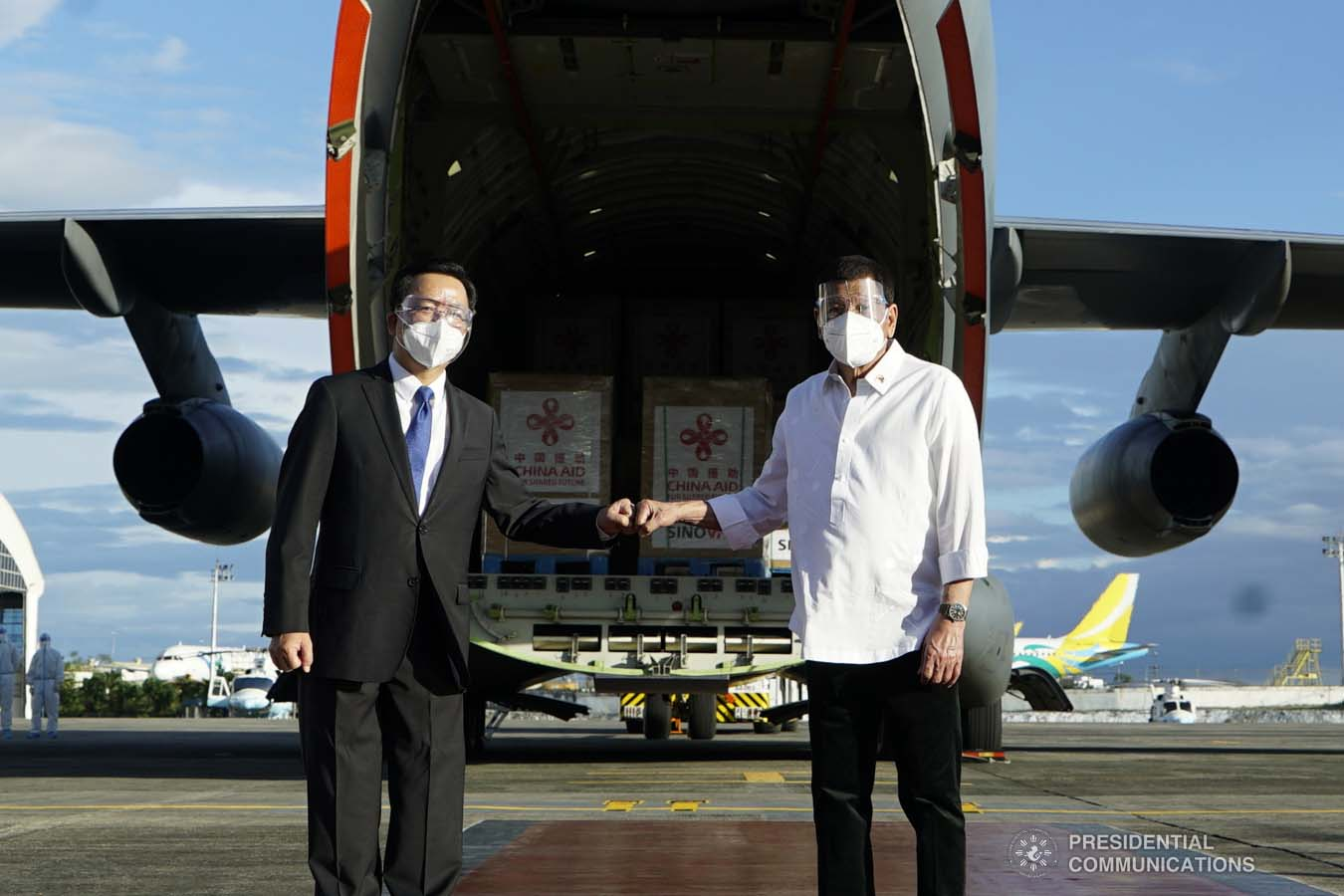
Chinese ambassador Huang Xilian (left) and Philippine president Rodrigo Duterte at a CoronaVac handover ceremony in February 2021

In May 2020, China announced that it would send masks, ventilators, and eventually vaccines to developing countries and countries suffering the most from the pandemic as a "global public good". Sinovac vaccines would begin distribution in the Philippines in March 2021, and would be the primary vaccine available to the Filipino public until early 2022 when U.S. vaccines began distribution. Philippine president Rodrigo Duterte requested China to grant the Philippines vaccines as soon as they were finished, which China approved of.

In June 2021, over 1.3 million COVID cases were reported in the Philippines, with nearly 24,000 Filipinos dying from it, making the nation have the worst death rate among nations in the Southeast Asia region. Only 2.1 million of the Philippines' 114 million citizens were fully vaccinated compared to the 70 million citizen benchmark set by the Philippine government, prompting President Rodrigo Duterte to make a public statement threatening to jail citizens who did not get vaccinated. By April 2022, around 66.7 million Filipinos were fully vaccinated, although vaccine hesitancy in the country persisted.

== Campaign ==
Under United States president Donald Trump's presidential term and up until a few months into Joe Biden's term, the U.S. military created and used at least 300 fake Twitter accounts to impersonate Filipino citizens pretending that the Sinovac Chinese COVID-19 vaccine and other products made in China such as face masks were ineffective or dangerous. The program was set up in the US military's psychological operations center at MacDill Air Force Base in Tampa, Florida. The earliest accounts were created in the spring of 2020, while most were made that summer. The tweets posted by the accounts regularly included the hashtag #ChinaAngVirus, meaning China is the virus in English. Many of the tweets posted about China being the source of the virus and the untrustworthiness of China regarding the medical supplies they sent to different countries.

Many of the tweets contained images and memes specifically created to further associate China and Chinese medical supplies with being ineffective or dangerous. A senior military officer claimed that the Department of Defense explicitly prioritized "drag[ging] China through the mud" over public health, with several US diplomats to Southeast Asia having their strong opposition overruled.

The propaganda campaign expanded beyond the Philippines into creating other accounts targeted to other countries in Southeast Asia, Central Asia, and in the Middle East in the summer of 2021. Many accounts created for Muslim-majority countries posted claims that the Sinovac vaccine contained pork gelatin, and were thus not halal and should not be allowed for use or distribution by Islamic law.

The Reuters report noted that even after social media executives approached Joe Biden's new administration about the COVID-19 misinformation campaign, the campaign continued until the administration banned it in the spring of 2021 and began an internal review. The review concluded that the campaign did not target any United States citizens. The U.S. military asked Meta officials to not take down content posted to the accounts. Some of the involved accounts remain active on Facebook as of June 2024.

== Discovery ==
Reuters investigators interviewed more than two dozen U.S. officials and military contractors to learn more about the fake accounts and the US military's reason for using them. A Pentagon spokeswoman claimed that while the military did use social media and other platforms to influence opinions, it was used to counter misinformation attacks against the United States and its allies, specifically to counter China using social media to falsely spread the idea that the U.S. was responsible for starting and worsening the pandemic. She stated that the campaign and other information tactics used by the U.S. military were "deliberate, methodical, and comprehensive".

Following the discovery of the propaganda campaign, X, formerly Twitter, deleted the involved accounts after investigations concluded that the accounts showed irregular activity patterns. An internal X investigation discovered over 150 fake accounts operated from Tampa using IP addresses and browser data from the accounts.

== Reactions ==
The Embassy of the Philippines in Washington, D.C. stated that the findings about the propaganda campaign deserve to be investigated and that officials in other countries affected by the campaign deserved to know about it. Several Filipino aid workers were outraged on learning about the campaign.

Many American public health experts condemned the campaign as favoring geopolitics over human lives and livelihoods. Many specialists stated that the disinformation campaign likely lowered trust in United States and worldwide governmental public health measures as a whole instead of just trust in China's measures, as well as lowering overall trust in vaccine safety and efficacy beyond Sinovac vaccines. Then-World Health Organization and Philippines health advisor Dr. Nina Castillo-Carandang stated that the high death rate at the time of the campaign coupled with the inability to produce substantial doses of vaccines in the Philippines made the campaign even more harmful and deadly to the Filipino public. Philippine health secretary Esperanza Cabral stated that there was widespread distrust in the Filipino population of the Sinovac vaccine by the time it reached the Philippines in March 2021, and believed that the campaign contributed to a significant number of unnecessary deaths.

A spokesperson representing the Chinese Embassy in Manila decried the apparent "hypocrisy, malign intention and double standards" of the US military and how their goals directly countered the human rights and health of the Filipino people.

Yuan Youwei, a Sinovac spokesperson, stated that the effects of the disinformation campaign and similar tactics would lower vaccination rates and trust in science and public health initiatives, resulting in worse disease spread and greater public anxiety and distrust as a whole. She emphasized the mission of Sinovac towards preventing disease and improving livelihoods, and that different professions should focus on their own specialties.

In June 2024, Philippine Senator Imee Marcos and Philippine House Representative France Castro pushed resolutions to initiate a probe into the impact of the disinformation campaign and potential legal responses to it if international law was blatantly violated, calling the campaign a direct threat to Philippine national security.

== See also ==
- COVID-19 misinformation by governments
- COVID-19 misinformation in the Philippines
- CIA fake vaccination campaign in Pakistan
- Anti–People's Republic of China sentiment
