= G7 Rapid Response Mechanism =

International political initiative

The G7 Rapid Response Mechanism (RRM) is an initiative introduced in the "Charlevoix Commitment on Defending Democracy from Foreign Threats", issued by the leaders of the Group of Seven (G7) countries—United States, Canada, Japan, United Kingdom, France, Germany and Italy—on June 9, 2018, during their summit in Charlevoix, Quebec. The RRM's mandate is to strengthen the coordination of G7 member countries, as well as

"to identify and respond to diverse and evolving threats to our democracies, including through sharing information and analysis, and identifying opportunities for coordinated response"

The G7 is an informal international intergovernmental economic organization that meets annually, whose members represent the seven wealthiest advanced economies in the world, as measured by the International Monetary Fund (IMF).

== Constituents ==
The following countries and organisations are members and observers (associate members) of the G7 Rapid Response Mechanism:

- Australia
- Canada
- France
- Germany
- Italy
- Japan
- Netherlands
- New Zealand
- Poland
- Sweden
- United Kingdom
- United States
- European Union
- (NATO) North Atlantic Treaty Organization

== Mandate ==
The RRM was mandated to "strengthen coordination to prevent, thwart and respond to malign and evolving threats to G7 democracies." It "will share information and threat analysis related to various threats to democracy, and is an established mechanism to identify opportunities for coordinated response."

According to the Institute for Research on Public Policy's Policy Options magazine, the "RRM initiative seeks to strengthen the leading democracies' coordination to identify and respond to diverse and evolving threats…including through sharing information and analysis, and identifying opportunities for a coordinated response."

== Administration ==
The RRM initiative is led by Canada through Global Affairs Canada's Centre for International Digital Policy. Tara Denham, Director of the Centre for International Digital Policy at Global Affairs Canada, directed the team responsible for setting up the RRM Coordination Unit.

Global Affairs Canada—the Department of Foreign Affairs, Trade and Development—is the federal Canadian ministry responsible for diplomatic and consular relations, international trade, and international development and humanitarian assistance. The Centre for International Digital Policy includes the Digital Inclusion Lab and the RRM. Denham is also the RRM's Canadian Focal Point.

At a briefing on "the security and intelligence threats to elections" of the House of Commons Standing Committee on Access to Information, Privacy and Ethics, the chair Bob Zimmer (CPC), said that the 2019 general election "may be different" from past elections in Canada. as the "tools that were used to strengthen civic engagement are being used to undermine, disrupt and destabilize democracy."

"Democracies around the world have entered a new era—an era of heightened threat and heightened vigilance—and 2019 will see a number of countries brace for volleys of attempted disruption: India, Australia, Ukraine, Switzerland, Belgium, the EU and, of course, Canada. Evidence has confirmed that the most recent Canadian general election, in 2015, was unencumbered by interference, although there were some relatively primitive attempts to disrupt, misinform and divide. These efforts were few in number and uncoordinated, and had no visible impact on the voter, either online or in line."

— Bob Zimmer

Zimmer described the initiative's three pillars.

- "enhancing citizen preparedness" through the "digital citizen initiative"
- "improving organizational readiness" with national security and intelligence agencies supporting Elections Canada
- "ensure a comprehensive understanding of and response to any threats to Canada's democratic process." by establishing the Security and Intelligence Threats to Elections Task Force (SITE) which works as a team with the Communications Security Establishment (CSE), the Canadian Security Intelligence Service (CSIS), the Royal Canadian Mounted Police (RCMP), as well as Global Affairs Canada

Zimmer said that as part of the third pillar, "We have activated the G7 rapid response mechanism, announced at the G7 leaders' summit in Charlevoix, to strengthen coordination among our G7 allies and to ensure that there is international collaboration and coordination in responding to foreign threats to democracy."

== Background ==
=== Charlevoix summit ===
The G7 met from June 8 to 9, 2018 during their summit at the Manoir Richelieu in Charlevoix, in La Malbaie, Quebec. The Charlevoix Summit was the 44th G7 summit.

The group issued eight "Commitments" at the summit. They included:

- Commitment on Defending Democracy from Foreign Threats
- Commitment on Equality and Economic Growth
- Commitment to End Sexual and Gender-Based Violence, Abuse and Harassment in Digital Contexts
- Declaration on Quality Education for Girls, Adolescent Girls and Women in Developing Countries
- Commitment on Innovative Financing for Development.

Prime Minister Justin Trudeau announced five themes for Canada's G7 presidency which began in January 2018.

=== Defending Democracy from Foreign Threats ===
"We commit to take concerted action in responding to foreign actors who seek to undermine our democratic societies and institutions, our electoral processes, our sovereignty and our security as outlined in the Charlevoix Commitment on Defending Democracy from Foreign Threats. We recognize that such threats, particularly those originating from state actors, are not just threats to G7 nations, but to international peace and security and the rules-based international order. We call on others to join us in addressing these growing threats by increasing the resilience and security of our institutions, economies and societies, and by taking concerted action to identify and hold to account those who would do us harm."

— June 9, 2019 G7 Communique

They committed to "cooperate in defending democracies from foreign threats and establish a response mechanism for that purpose".

"Democracy and the rules-based international order are increasingly being challenged by authoritarianism and the defiance of international norms. In particular, foreign actors seek to undermine our democratic societies and institutions, our electoral processes, our sovereignty and our security. These malicious, multi-faceted and ever-evolving tactics constitute a serious strategic threat which we commit to confront together, working with other governments that share our democratic values."

— Charlevoix Commitment on Defending Democracy from Foreign Threats. G7. June 9, 2018

The Charlevoix Commitment states that "foreign actors seek to undermine our democratic societies and institutions, our electoral processes, our sovereignty and our security. These malicious, multi-faceted and ever-evolving tactics constitute a serious strategic threat which we commit to confront together, working together with other governments that share our democratic values." The Charlevoix Summit resolved to "establish a G7 Rapid Response Mechanism to strengthen our coordination to identify and respond to diverse and evolving threats to our democracies, including through sharing information and analysis, and identifying opportunities for coordinated response."

== Monitored elections ==
=== 2019 European Parliament election ===
RRM Canada's comprehensive report on the 2019 European Parliament election analyzed open data "related to foreign interference during and leading up to the 2019 European Union Parliamentary Elections, May 23–26, 2019". RRM Canada did not find "significant evidence of state-based foreign interference, or any large-scale, organized and coordinated efforts by non-state actors". They did find that "national or international non-state actors" used tactics based on those used by the Russian sponsored Internet Research Agency (IRA) in previous elections, "such as the 2016 U.S. Elections". For example, blogs, webpages, and social media accounts on Twitter, Facebook and Reddit "were used to spread divisive and false information to damage and negatively impact social cohesion and trust in democratic processes and institutions" in coordinated networks of Facebook groups.

=== 2019 Alberta general election ===
RRM Canada's analyz report on the 2019 Alberta general election was intended to "identify any emerging tactics in foreign interference and draw lessons learned for the Canadian general elections scheduled to take place in October 2019." No foreign activity was detected, although the data revealed ""suspicious account creation pattern that is indicative of troll or bot activity".

They found "automated inauthentic behaviour and trolling activities" but concluded that they were "very likely domestic". The data showed "suspicious account creation pattern that is indicative of troll or bot activity", and "spikes in account creation" which suggested the "presence of accounts developed for a specific purpose." The accounts were very likely domestic and were "mainly comprised of supporters of the United Conservative Party (UCP)." A second small community with suspicious account creation patterns were identified as supporters of the national People's Party of Canada. The report concluded that there was "no evidence supporting a broad, coordinated campaign to influence the Alberta election."

The report noted that "domestic actors" were "emulating" "tactics used by foreign actors, within the context of provincial elections and that this "behaviour will make it increasingly difficult to distinguish national from foreign interference efforts" in the upcoming 2019 Canadian federal election on October 21, 2019.

In January 2019, Policy Options said that, "the nascent Rapid Response Mechanism (RRM) initiated in 2018 under Canada's G7 presidency to defend against foreign threats holds promise and could offer a valuable model of cooperation for future efforts to defend democracy and the ideas that underlie it." The RRM initiative seeks to strengthen the leading democracies' “coordination to identify and respond to diverse and evolving threats…including through sharing information and analysis, and identifying opportunities for a coordinated response."

== Disruption tactics ==
=== Divisive narratives ===
RRM Canada identified a shift from information warfare to narrative competition, in which narratives about divisive issues such as "immigration, Muslims in Europe, climate change and liberal vs conservative values" are disseminated and amplified across "national borders and global political contexts to engage pan-European, regional and international communities." National or international non-state actors would strategically amplify inauthentic, divisive and inflammatory content on topics such as "immigration/migration, anti-religious sentiment (Muslim and Jewish), nationalist identity, women’s health, gender-based harassment and climate change".

=== Decontextualizing authentic information ===
In the European Union, RRM data analysis showed that authentic information was "de-contextualized", "manipulated" and "distorted", then used by "questionable" writers on "untrustworthy" sites to "seed conversations", which were then "framed using a divisive and inflammatory narrative." These would reference the original authentic source. In a "coordinated fashion" the information would be "amplified" with the most "susceptible communities" targeted. It would be translated into a number of different languages. The RRM Canada report said that a "version of this tactic has been observed as being used by Kremlin-linked actors and is a known tactic of covert, malicious foreign actors."

=== Indian state-aligned media ===
In September 2024, RRM Canada released a report titled "Potential Foreign Information Manipulation, and Interference following PM Statement on Killing of Hardeep Singh Nijjar". The report examined content from popular Indian State-aligned media outlets and influencers, such as Asian News International (ANI), WION/WION News (Zee Media), Aaj Tak, and journalists like Smita Prakash, Palki Sharma, and Anand Ranganathan. The report noted that "Modi-aligned outlets amplified several state-supported narratives about Prime Minister Trudeau, "Canada's High Commissioner to India, Canada's national security agencies, Canada's Punjabi Sikh diaspora, and Hardeep Singh Nijjar's political beliefs." The report also noted the “massive digital footprint” of some of these media outlets in comparison to Canadian media outlets, and the likely reach they had to global and Canadian audiences.
