= Impact of the COVID-19 pandemic on international relations =

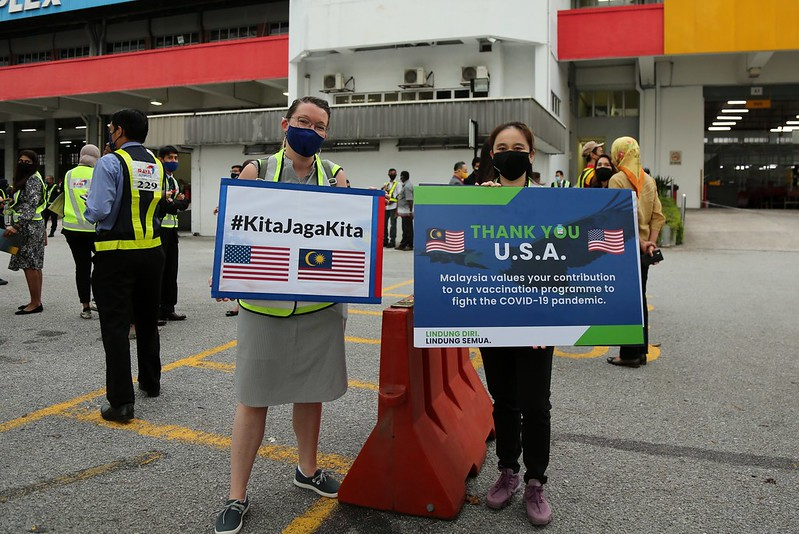
Vaccine diplomacy, such as between Malaysia and the United States, influenced international relations during the pandemic.

The COVID-19 pandemic has affected international relations and has caused diplomatic tensions, as well as resulted in a United Nations Security Council resolution demanding a global ceasefire.

Some scholars have argued that the pandemic necessitates a significant rethinking of existing approaches to international relations, with a greater focus on issues such as health diplomacy, the politics of crisis, and border politics. Others have argued that the pandemic is unlikely to lead to significant changes in the international system. Diplomatic relations have been affected due to tensions around trade and transport of medicines, diagnostic tests, vaccines and hospital equipment related to mitigating the impact of COVID-19. Leaders of some countries have accused others of not containing the disease or responding effectively.

Muzaffar S. Abduazimov mentions that currently, diplomatic practice experiencing "six major trends caused by the pandemic are namely: acceleration of ICTs penetration; reappraisal of information security; ensuring the reliability of public diplomacy; further diversification of responsible duties; the growing role of psychology; and, the emergence of the hybrid diplomatic etiquette and protocol."

== China ==
The Chinese government has been criticized by the United States for its handling of the pandemic, which began in the Chinese province of Wuhan. In Brazil, Congressman Eduardo Bolsonaro, son of President Jair Bolsonaro, caused a diplomatic dispute with China when he retweeted a message saying: "The blame for the global coronavirus pandemic has a name and surname: the Chinese Communist party." Yang Wanming, China's top diplomat in Brazil, retweeted a message that said: "The Bolsonaro family is the great poison of this country."

State propaganda in China has been promoting a narrative that China's authoritarian system is uniquely capable of curbing the coronavirus and contrasts that with the chaotic response of the Western democracies. European Union foreign policy chief Josep Borrell said that "China is aggressively pushing the message that, unlike the US, it is a responsible and reliable partner."

To counter its negative image, China has sent aid to 82 countries, the World Health Organization, and the African Union. According to Yangyang Cheng, a postdoctoral research associate at Cornell University, "The Chinese government has been trying to project Chinese state power beyond its borders and establish China as a global leader, not dissimilar to what the U.S. government has been doing for the better part of a century, and the distribution of medical aid is part of this mission." Borrell warned that there is "a geo-political component including a struggle for influence through spinning and the ‘politics of generosity’."

The Chinese government, officials, and state-run media have attempted to deflect criticisms by pushing the conspiracy theory that the coronavirus originated in the United States and that the U.S. Army initiated the coronavirus epidemic in Wuhan; there is no evidence to support these claims. The U.S. State Department summoned the Chinese ambassador on Friday to protest conspiracy theories spread by Zhao Lijian, a spokesman for the Chinese foreign ministry.

Because of China's perceived mishandling of the coronavirus epidemic, the largest tabloid newspaper of Germany put together a 130 billion euros damage that they would like for China to pay to Germany. China responded that this act stirs up xenophobia and racism.

Spain, Turkey and the Netherlands announced that thousands of testing kits and medical masks exported from China are below standard or defective. The Dutch health ministry recalled 600,000 face masks, Spain encountered problems with 60,000 test kits and Turkey had problems with accuracy of some test kits.

== United States ==
The United States has come under scrutiny by officials from other countries for allegedly diverting shipments of crucial supplies meant for other countries.

Jean Rottner, the President of France's Regional Council of Grand Est, accused the United States of disrupting face mask deliveries by buying at the last minute. French officials stated that Americans came to the airport tarmac and offered several times the French payment as the shipment was prepared for departure to France. Justin Trudeau, the Prime Minister of Canada, asked Bill Blair, the Public Safety Minister, and Marc Garneau, the Transportation Minister, to investigate allegations that medical supplies originally intended for Canada were diverted to the United States. German politician Andreas Geisel accused the United States of committing "modern piracy" after reports that 200,000 N95 masks meant for German police were diverted during an en-route transfer between airplanes in Thailand to the United States, but later changed his statement after he clarified that the mask orders were made through a German firm, not a U.S. firm as earlier stated, and the supply chain issues were under review.

Due to shortages in coronavirus tests, Maryland Governor Larry Hogan had his wife Yumi Hogan, who was born in South Korea, speak with the South Korean ambassador. Afterwards, multiple South Korea companies stated that they would send tests to Maryland.

On 2 April 2020, President Trump invoked the Defense Production Act of 1950 to halt exports of masks produced by 3M to Canada and Latin America. Canadian Prime Minister Justin Trudeau said that it would be a mistake for both their countries to limit trade of essential goods or services, including medical supplies and professionals, and remarked that this moves in both directions. The Canadian government has turned to China and other places for crucial medical supplies, while they seek a constructive discussion about the issue with the Trump administration.

Donald Trump warned India for retaliation if the government did not release hydroxychloroquine medicine to the US. Following this, India lifted the temporary export ban on the drug paving the way for shipping it to the United States.

A Reuters 2024 report revealed that the United States government launched a covert propaganda and disinformation campaign that aimed to erode Filipinos' trust in vaccines developed by China and Russia amidst tense US-Philippine relations under Philippine President Rodrigo Duterte, who sought closer ties with the two countries.

== European Union ==
The Spanish Prime Minister Pedro Sánchez stated that "If we don't propose now a unified, powerful and effective response to this economic crisis, not only the impact will be tougher, but its effects will last longer and we will be putting at risk the entire European project", while the Italian Prime Minister Giuseppe Conte commented that "the whole European project risks losing its raison d'être in the eyes of our own citizens". From 4 to 19 March, Germany banned the export of personal protective equipment, and France also restricted exports of medical equipment, drawing criticism from EU officials who called for solidarity. Many Schengen Area countries closed their borders to stem the spread of the virus.

=== Jointly issued debt ===
Debates over how to respond to the epidemic and its economic fallout have opened up a rift between Northern and Southern European member states, reminiscent of debates over the 2010s European debt crisis. Nine EU countries—Italy, France, Belgium, Greece, Portugal, Spain, Ireland, Slovenia and Luxembourg—called for "corona bonds" (a type of eurobond) in order to help their countries to recover from the epidemic, on 25 March. Their letter stated, "The case for such a common instrument is strong, since we are all facing a symmetric external shock." Northern European countries such as Germany, Austria, Finland, and the Netherlands oppose the issuing of joint debt, fearing that they would have to pay it back in the event of a default. Instead, they propose that countries should apply for loans from the European Stability Mechanism. Corona bonds were discussed on 26 March 2020 in a European Council meeting, which dragged out for three hours longer than expected due to the "emotional" reactions of the prime ministers of Spain and Italy. European Council President Charles Michel and European Central Bank head Christine Lagarde have urged the EU to consider issuing joint debt. Unlike the European debt crisis—partly caused by the affected countries—southern European countries did not cause the coronavirus pandemic, therefore eliminating the appeal to national responsibility.

=== Civil liberties ===
Sixteen member nations of the European Union issued a statement warning that certain emergency measures issued by countries during the coronavirus pandemic could undermine the principles of rule of law and democracy on 1 April. They announced that they "support the European Commission initiative to monitor the emergency measures and their application to ensure the fundamental values of the Union are upheld." The statement does not mention Hungary, but observers believe that it implicitly refers to a Hungarian law granting plenary power to the Hungarian Government during the coronavirus pandemic. The following day, the Hungarian Government joined the statement.

The Hungarian parliament passed the law granting plenary power to the Government by qualified majority, 137 to 53 votes in favor, on 30 March 2020. After promulgating the law, the President of Hungary, János Áder, announced that he had concluded that the time frame of the Government's authorization would be definite and its scope would be limited. Ursula von der Leyen, the President of the European Commission, stated that she was concerned about the Hungarian emergency measures and that it should be limited to what is necessary and Minister of State Michael Roth suggested that economic sanctions should be used against Hungary.

The heads of thirteen member parties of the European People's Party (EPP) made a proposal to expunge the Hungarian Fidesz for the new legislation on 2 April. In response, Viktor Orbán expressed his willingness to discuss any issues relating to Fidesz's membership "once the pandemic is over" in a letter addressed to the Secretary General of EPP Antonio López-Istúriz White. Referring to the thirteen leading politicians' proposal, Orbán also stated that "I can hardly imagine that any of us having time for fantasies about the intentions of other countries. This seems to be a costly luxury these days." During a video conference of the foreign ministers of the European Union member states on 3 April 2020, Hungarian Minister of Foreign Affairs, Péter Szijjártó, asked for the other ministers to read the legislation itself not its politically motivated presentations in newspapers before commenting on it.

== Japan–South Korea relations ==
Japan–South Korea relations worsened as a result of the pandemic. After Japan declared it would start quarantining all arrivals from South Korea, the South Korean government described the move as “unreasonable, excessive and extremely regrettable”, and that it couldn't "help but question whether Japan has other motives than containing the outbreak".

== Russia-Saudi Arabia relations ==
In response to dramatic drop in oil consumption due to the COVID-19 pandemic, Saudi Arabia attempted to orchestrate a worldwide decrease in oil production to keep prices at a moderate level. However, when Russia refused to reduce oil production, Saudi Arabia triggered an oil price war in March 2020. This economic conflict resulted in a sheer drop of oil price over the spring of 2020, with the price becoming negative on April 20. Since oil production is inelastic and cannot be stopped completely, but even the lowest possible production level generates much greater supply than demand, the oil industry has nowhere to store oil and is ready to pay for it being taken away.

== Iran ==
Iran's regime spread a narrative that the coronavirus was a conspiracy orchestrated by the United States. Hossein Salami, commander-in-chief of the Islamic Revolutionary Guard Corps, suggested that the coronavirus may have been an American biological invasion.

== Costa Rica-Nicaragua relations ==
On 14 May 2020, fifty-two of the fifty-seven deputies of the Legislative Assembly of Costa Rica signed a letter addressed to the director of the Pan American Health Organization (PAHO), Carissa Etienne, in which they expressed their "concern" for the situation of the pandemic by COVID-19 in Nicaragua, calling for "forceful and urgent measures to be taken in this regard" in the neighboring country, and, at the same time, warning that Nicaragua's response could have negative effects on the rest of the Central American countries. The deputies questioned the Nicaraguan government's figures of 25 coronavirus infections with eight deaths, in contrast to data from the independent Citizen Observatory, which has calculated 1,033 cases and at least 188 deaths in Nicaragua.

As a result of this, the deputies of the Nicaraguan government party, the Sandinista National Liberation Front, issued a statement on 15 May rejecting the act of the Costa Rican deputies, calling it as "political demands that evidently reflect xenophobic and racist positions that is not the first time that they have demonstrated against Nicaragua”.

== International aid and health diplomacy ==
In the midst of the COVID-19 pandemic, international actors provided several relief packages and support actions to help countries deal with the outbreak. In the early phases of the epidemic, several countries donated masks, medical equipment and money to China. Once the crisis in China stabilised, the country began sending aid to other nations. In March, China, Cuba and Russia sent medical supplies and experts to help Italy deal with its coronavirus outbreak. Some commentators raised suspicions on these moves and dubbed them as a form of propaganda. To some, health diplomacy provided the opportunity to create narratives of friends and enemies in an attempt to win the hearts and minds of foreign audiences.

== Allegations of Russian espionage ==
The UK's National Cyber Security Centre, together with the Canadian Communications Security Establishment, the United States Department for Homeland Security Cybersecurity Infrastructure Security Agency, and the US National Security Agency in mid-July, 2020, jointly alleged that Russian state-backed hackers have been trying to steal COVID-19 treatment and vaccine research from academic and pharmaceutical institutions in other countries; Russia has denied these allegations.

== Global ceasefire and armed conflict dynamics ==
The COVID-19 pandemic led to a United Nations Security Council resolution demanding a global ceasefire. On March 23, 2020, United Nations Secretary-General António Manuel de Oliveira Guterres issued an appeal for a global ceasefire as part of the United Nations' response to the COVID-19 pandemic. On 24 June 2020, 170 UN Member States and Observers signed a non-binding statement in support of the appeal, rising to 172 on 25 June 2020. On 1 July 2020, the UN Security Council passed resolution S/RES/2532 (2020), demanding a "general and immediate cessation of hostilities in all situations on its agenda," expressing support for "the efforts undertaken by the Secretary-General and his Special Representatives and Special Envoys in that respect," calling for "all parties to armed conflicts to engage immediately in a durable humanitarian pause" of at least 90 consecutive days, and calling for greater international cooperation to address the pandemic.

It is uncertain whether armed conflicts have escalated or de-escalated during the pandemic. Rustad and colleagues argue that the success of COVID-related ceasefires has been very limited so far. A study of nine selected countries finds that the pandemic increased conflict intensity in India, Iraq, Libya, Pakistan and the Philippines. This was the case as rebel groups tried to exploit weaknesses of the state apparatus during the pandemic, while international attention shifted away from armed groups. Even in countries where conflict intensity declined, such as Afghanistan or Colombia, rebels attempt to gain new followers by implementing their own pandemic response or by recruiting unemployed youth. However, just like governments, rebel groups also face enormous challenges due to border closures and economic recession. In line with this, the overall number of battles increased after the first wave of lockdowns in the Middle East. However, there was a downwards trend in Asia, most likely related to logistical challenges for armed groups. Another study on global conflict trends detects a temporary decline in protest events after the first wave of lockdowns in March and April 2020 for around six months. Battles events, by contrast, did not decline and even increased in some countries (such as Libya) because armed groups aimed to exploit pandemic-related weaknesses of their opponents.

== See also ==
- Impact of the COVID-19 pandemic
- Impact of the COVID-19 pandemic on politics
- United Nations' response to the COVID-19 pandemic
