= List of United Nations resolutions in response to the COVID-19 pandemic =

This is a list of United Nations resolutions in the General Assembly and in the Security Council in direct response to the COVID-19 pandemic, as part of the United Nations' response to the coronavirus pandemic.

== General Assembly ==
- 2 April 2020: A/RES/74/270: Global solidarity to fight the coronavirus disease 2019 (COVID-19).
- 20 April 2020: A/RES/74/274: International cooperation to ensure global access to medicines, vaccines and medical equipment to face COVID-19.

== Security Council ==
- 1 July 2020: S/RES/2532: Maintenance of international peace and security.

== See also ==
- Global ceasefire
- Timeline of the COVID-19 pandemic
- World Health Organization's response to the COVID-19 pandemic
