= United Nations Security Council Resolution 2250 =

UN Security Council Resolution 2250
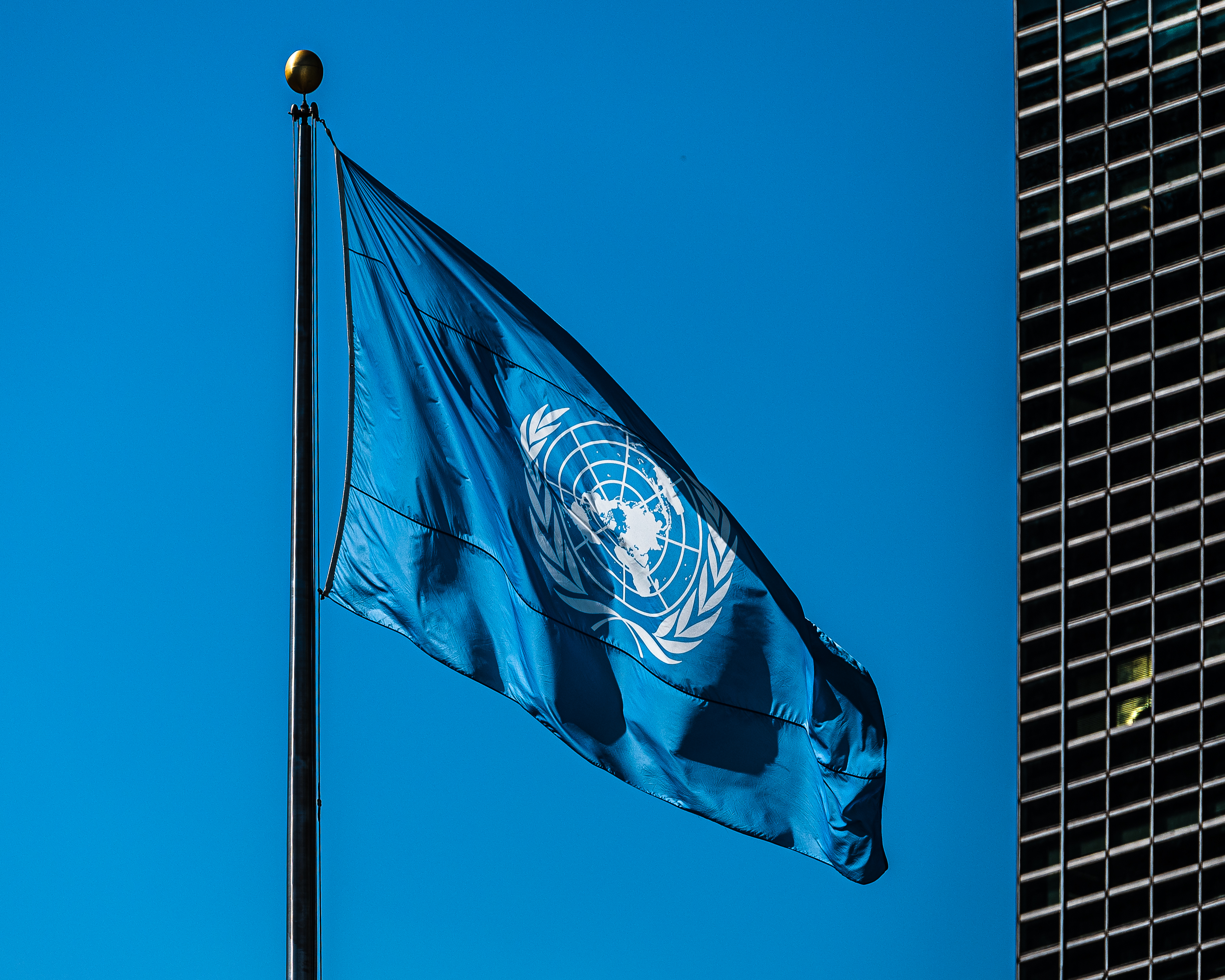
- UN flag
- Date: 9 December 2015
- Meeting no.: 7,573
- Code: S/RES/2250 (Document)
- Subject: Maintenance of international peace and security
- Voting summary: 15 voted for; None voted against; None abstained; None absent
- Result: Adopted

Security Council composition
- Permanent members: China; France; Russia; United Kingdom; United States
- Non-permanent members: Angola; Chad; Chile; Jordan; Lithuania; Malaysia; New Zealand; Nigeria; Spain; Venezuela

UNSC resolution 2250 - first international resolution to formally recognize the positive contributions of young people in peacebuilding and conflict prevention.

United Nations Security Council Resolution 2250 was unanimously adopted on 9 December 2015 at the initiative of Jordan.

The Resolution 2250 is a thematic resolution that deals with the topic of youth from an international peace and security perspective. Recognizing the youth's efforts in peace building, it provides a set of guidelines upon which policies and programs will be developed by member states, the UN and civil society. This global policy framework, adopted by the UNSC in December 2015, explores how conflict impacts young people's lives and what must be done to mitigate its effects, as well as how youth can be meaningfully included in creating peaceful communities. This resolution talks about five key action areas/pillars: Participation, Protection, Prevention, Partnership and Disengagement and Reintegration. These five pillars and the resolution itself promote a new narrative of young people with regard to peace and ensures legitimacy and accountability

== See also ==
- United Nations Programme on Youth(UNPY)
- United Nations Envoy on Youth
- Justice Call
- United Nations Security Council Resolution 2535
- United Nations Security Council Resolution 2419
