= Youth, Peace, and Security =

United Nations agenda

Youth, Peace, and Security (YPS) is an international policy agenda that recognizes the important role of young people in preventing conflict, sustaining peace, and shaping security processes at local, national, regional, and global levels. The framework was established through a series of United Nations Security Council resolutions and has since guided efforts by Member States, the UN system, civil society, and youth-led organizations to strengthen youth engagement in peace and security initiatives.

== Background ==
UNSC resolution 2250 - first international resolution to formally recognize the positive contributions of young people in peacebuilding and conflict prevention.

United Nations Security Council Resolution 2250 was unanimously adopted on 9 December 2015 at the initiative of Jordan.

The Resolution 2250 is a thematic resolution that deals with the topic of youth from an international peace and security perspective. Recognizing the youth's efforts in peace building, it provides a set of guidelines upon which policies and programs will be developed by member states, the UN and civil society. This global policy framework, adopted by the UNSC in December 2015, explores how conflict impacts young people's lives and what must be done to mitigate its effects, as well as how youth can be meaningfully included in creating peaceful communities. This resolution talks about five key action areas/pillars: Participation, Protection, Prevention, Partnership and Disengagement and Reintegration. These five pillars and the resolution itself promote a new narrative of young people with regard to peace and ensures legitimacy and accountability

The UNSC resolution 2250 was the first international resolution to formally recognize the positive contributions that young people make to peacebuilding and conflict prevention. It marked a shift from seeing youth solely as victims or perpetrators of violence to acknowledging them as partners in building sustainable peace.

Subsequent resolutions, including UNSCR 2419 (2018) and UNSCR 2535 (2020), have built upon the initial framework by reinforcing youth participation in peace processes and integrating the agenda more fully into UN priorities.

== Pillars ==
The Youth, Peace, and Security agenda is structured around the following five key pillars:

1. Participation - ensuring meaningful inclusion of young people in peace and security decision making, from conflict prevention to negotiations and peacebuilding processes.
2. Protection - safeguarding the rights and safety of youth affected by conflict and violence, and ensuring access to justice.
3. Prevention - reducing the cause that push young people towards violence, including addressing exclusion, inequality, and lack of opportunity.
4. Partnerships - maintaining cooperation between governments, international organizations, civil society, and youth groups to promote peace initiatives.
5. Disengagement and Reintegration - supporting young people previously involved in armed groups or violence in their transition back into society through education, employment, and social inclusion programs.
