= United Nations response to the COVID-19 pandemic =

Aspect of pandemic

The United Nations response to the COVID-19 pandemic has been led by its Secretary-General and can be divided into formal resolutions at the General Assembly and at the Security Council (UNSC), and operations via its specialized agencies and chiefly the World Health Organization in the initial stages, but involving more humanitarian-oriented agencies as the humanitarian impact became clearer, and then economic organizations, like the United Nations Conference on Trade and Development, the International Labour Organization, and the World Bank, as the socioeconomic implications worsened.

In June 2020, the Secretary-General launched the 'UN Comprehensive Response to COVID-19'; the UN has also launched a global vaccination initiative. Given the impact on the global economy, funding has been an especial problem, as it has for ongoing operations, and the 'UN Comprehensive Response to COVID-19' has a dedicated funding package attached. The UNSC has been criticized for a slow coordinated response, especially regarding the global ceasefire, which aims to open up humanitarian access to the world's most vulnerable in conflict zones.

== Office of the Secretary-General ==
=== United Nations Comprehensive Response to COVID-19 ===
The 'UN Comprehensive Response to COVID-19' is a policy document issued by the United Nations Secretary-General on 25 June 2020, which aims to coordinate the United Nations System to "save lives, protect societies, recover better". The policy document sets out what must be done to deliver a global response "that leaves no-one behind", reduces global vulnerability to future pandemics, builds resilience to future shocks, especially climate change, and addresses "the severe and systemic inequalities exposed by the pandemic". The document focuses on three main operational approaches, namely delivering a large coordinated and comprehensive response on health; adopting policies to address the adverse human rights, humanitarian, and socioeconomic, humanitarian effects; and creating a recovery process that "builds back better".

As part of the United Nations' response, the UN Secretary-General has been prominent in ensuring the maintenance of normal UN operations, in launching events, and making in appeals on behalf of the United Nations System, including for the world's first global ceasefire and for billions of dollars in funding. He has also defended the WHO's response to the crisis and fought back against COVID-19 misinformation. As the UN's response became more systematized, he been issuing policy briefs, by theme, population, and region, to aid governments in how to address the consequences of the pandemic. The below account, while indicative, is not complete, and it does not include links to the transcripts of appeals and speeches, which can be found on multiple United Nations websites.

=== Timeline ===
==== March ====
On 13 March 2020, in a video message, the UN Secretary-General assured the world that the COVID-19 virus would peak, and that the global economy would recover but, until then, "we must act together to slow the spread of the virus and look after each other". On 15 March, he announced that the UN was putting in places measures to protect staff while affirming that it would continue normal operations. On 19 March, the Secretary-General held his first virtual press conference, stating, "more than ever before, we need solidarity, hope and the political will to see this crisis through together". On 23 March, the Secretary-General called for the world's first global ceasefire to support the bigger battle against COVID-19, a "common enemy that is now threatening all of humankind". On 24 March, the Secretary-General welcomed the Group of 20 industrialized powers (G20) decision to convene an emergency virtual summit on the pandemic and recommended three areas for discussion. On 25 March, the UN launched a major humanitarian appeal and $2 billion coordinated global humanitarian response plan to aid the most affected and most vulnerable countries and prevent COVID-19 from "circling back around the globe". Echoing his 23 March appeal to warring parties across the globe for an immediate global ceasefire, he called on those fighting in Yemen to cease hostilities and increase efforts to counter a potential COVID-19 outbreak. On 26 March, the Secretary-General emphasized at the G20 virtual summit that a sustainable global economy must arise once the COVID-19 pandemic is reversed, as the G20 committed to inject over $5 trillion into the global economy to counteract the effects of the pandemic. On 29 March, the UN in New York donated 250,000 face masks to New York City health workers, with the Secretary-General making the handover. On 31 March, he launched a comprehensive socioeconomic plan, Shared Responsibility, Global Solidarity: Responding to the Socio-economic Impacts of COVID-19, to "defeat the virus and build a better world".

==== April ====
On 2 April 2020, on World Autism Awareness Day, the UN Secretary-General appealed for the rights of persons with autism to be taken into account in efforts to address the COVID-19 pandemic. On 3 April, the Secretary-General warned of a surge in domestic violence due to lockdowns. The same day, the Secretary-General reiterated his call for a global ceasefire and urged unity in mobilizing "every ounce of energy" to defeat the coronavirus pandemic. On 8 April, in response to criticism of the WHO, the Secretary-General urged global support for the agency, which has led the multilateral response since the beginning, describing it as "absolutely critical" in overcoming COVID-19. On 9 April, the Secretary-General welcomed a ceasefire declaration by Saudi Arabia in Yemen as a way to contribute towards his global ceasefire call, promote peace and slow the advance of COVID-19. On the same day, the Secretary-General launched a new policy brief on women and equality and issues a dire warning that the pandemic could reverse gains in equality over previous years. On 11 April, the Secretary-General called on religious leaders of all faiths to join forces and work for global peace and focus on the common battle to defeat COVID-19. On 14 April, he warned of "a dangerous epidemic of misinformation" during "the most challenging crisis we have faced since the Second World War", leaving millions scared and seeking clear advice. The UN Secretary-General urges unity and calls for countries not to cut the resources of the WHO, as US President Trump halts funding. On 15 April, the Secretary-General pledged that the UN would stand in solidarity with Africa in the face of the unprecedented economic, social and health impacts of the COVID-19 pandemic, from procuring test kits to promoting debt relief.

In the second half of April 2020, on 16 April, the Secretary-General launched a new UN report noting that the looming global recession due to the COVID-19 pandemic could cause hundreds of thousands of additional child deaths in 2020, reversing recent gains in reducing global infant mortality. On 19 April, the Secretary-General sent a video message in support of the UN-supported 'One World: Together At Home' event. On 21 April, he pledged the UN's continued support to the Alliance of Small Island States on climate change and the socioeconomic effects of COVID-19. 22 April: On International Mother Earth Day, the UN Secretary flags the COVID-19 pandemic as "an unprecedented wake-up call" and offers six ways to help the climate. On 23 April, the Secretary-General released a new policy brief on shaping an effective, inclusive response to the COVID-19 pandemic, echoed his February 'Call to Action' to put human dignity and the Universal Declaration of Human Rights at the core of the UN's work, and warning that the coronavirus pandemic was "fast becoming a human rights crisis". On 28 April, he addressed the Petersberg Climate Dialogue in Berlin, part of the COP26 process, stating that the parallel threats of COVID-19 and climate change require "brave, visionary and collaborative leadership" and noting that the Sustainable Development Goals are under threat.

==== May ====
On 1 May 2020, the UN Secretary-General warned the COVID-19 fatality rate for people over 80-years-old was five times the global average, as he launched a new policy initiative tor challenges faced by the elderly as a result of "the biggest public health crisis to hit the world in a century". On 5 May, he launched a new report showing that the COVID-19 pandemic was intensifying inequalities experienced by the world's one billion people with disabilities, calling for an inclusive recovery and response. On 8 May, the Secretary General made a global appeal calling for concerted global action to quash the "tsunami" of hate speech accompanying the COVID-19 pandemic. On 12 May, in an online meeting with religious leaders via the UN Alliance of Civilizations, he noted the coronavirus pandemic had revealed "our common humanity", stressing the important role that religious leaders could play in limiting the damage caused by COVID-19. On 13 May, the Secretary-General highlighted that in its World Economic Situation and Prospect report update, the UN Department of Economic and Social Affairs reported that as of mid-2020, the GDP in developed countries would fall to −5.0 per cent, while the output of developing countries would shrink by 0.7 per cent, causing some $8.5 trillion in overall losses and eroding nearly four years of output gains. On 14 May, the Secretary-General launched the 'COVID-19 And The Need for Action On Mental Health' UN policy brief, urging the international community to do more to protect those facing increasing mental pressures.

On 20 May 2020, at the launch of a UN briefing paper focusing on the impact of COVID-19 across Africa, the Secretary-General called for solidarity to preserve Africa's hard-won progress. On 21 May, he launched Verified, led by the UN's Department of Global Communications, to create a cadre of "digital first responders" to increase the volume and reach of trusted, accurate information on the COVID-19 crisis. On 22 May, on International Day for Biological Diversity, he called for the world to build back better and preserve biodiversity after the COVID-19 pandemic. On 28 May, the Secretary General called for greater "unity and solidarity" at a high-level funding meeting as he warned of 60 million pushed into extreme poverty; coming famines of "historic proportions"; approximately 1.6 billion people unemployed; and a 'Great Depression'-like loss of $8.5 trillion in global output.

==== June ====
On 2 June 2020, at a virtual pledging conference for Yemen, where community transmission of the coronavirus was likely underway, the UN Secretary-General warned that the country, whose health system had collapsed, was facing a massive humanitarian crisis and was "hanging on by a thread". On 3 June, the Secretary-General launched the latest UN policy briefing on the pandemic, which reminded countries of their obligation to protect internally displaced people, migrants, and refugees, now more than 70 million globally, according to data from the UN refugee agency, UNHCR. The Secretary-General also appealed for greater unity and solidarity to defeat COVID-19 and build a better world in its wake, in opening remarks to an extraordinary inter-sessional summit of the 79-member Organization of African, Caribbean and Pacific States. On 4 June, the Secretary-General stated in a video message to the Global Vaccine Summit that a COVID-19 vaccine in itself will not be enough, but that it must be affordable and accessible. On 9 June, the Secretary-General launched his latest policy brief on the pandemic, concerning global food security, emphasizing that the dire global food security impacts of the crisis, including an additional 50 million people falling into extreme poverty, could be avoided if countries acted immediately. On 10 June, the Secretary-General addressed a virtual gathering of the Global Investors for Sustainable Development Alliance, warning that the "unparalleled economic shock" due to the coronavirus was putting development gains at risk. On 11 June, the Secretary-General informed the "High-level Thematic Debate on the Impact of Rapid Technological Change on the Sustainable Development Goals (SDGs) and Targets", taking place in the General Assembly, that managing the digital divide better had become "a matter of life and death" owing to people being unable to access essential healthcare information during the pandemic.

On 19 June, the UN Secretary-General issued a new policy brief, the World of Work and COVID-19, concerning jobs, livelihoods and the well-being of workers, families and businesses globally, as they continued to be affected by the COVID-19 pandemic; with micro, small and medium enterprises in particular, suffering dire economic consequences. On 23 June, the Secretary-General on International Widow's Day called for countries to work towards dismantling laws that discriminate against women, particularly over inheritance, as they built back from the COVID-19 pandemic. On 25 June, the Secretary-General launched the 'UN Comprehensive Response to COVID-19' a major policy document to coordinate the United Nations System to "save lives, protect societies, recover better" during and after the pandemic. On 30 June, the Secretary-General called on the world to increase "financial, humanitarian and political commitments", to help end nearly a decade of major conflict and suffering in Syria, in a message to the fourth Brussels Donor Conference.

==== July ====
On 1 July 2020, the UN Secretary-General announced that unless the world acted immediately, with "bold and creative" solutions, the COVID-19 pandemic and related global recession would trigger "years of depressed and disrupted economic growth". On 2 July, the Secretary-General informed the Security Council that the COVID-19 pandemic was "profoundly affecting" global peace and security across the globe, and he urged it to employ its collective influence to mitigate the protections crisis facing millions of vulnerable people, including those affected by conflicts. On 6 July, the Secretary-General warned that the pandemic had exposed vulnerabilities to "new and emerging forms of terrorism", such as cyberattacks, bioterrorism and the misuse of digital technology. On 9 July, the Secretary-General called on UN Member States to urgently address the 'unprecedented' impact of coronavirus on Latin America and the Caribbean, as it now had the highest rates of transmission, exacerbating the severe poverty, hunger, unemployment and inequality in the region. On 11 July, as part of World Population Day, the UN Secretary-General highlighted that the pandemic had deepened "existing inequalities and vulnerabilities, particularly for women and girls". On 11 July, the Secretary-General launched the UN's multi-agency annual State of Food Security and Nutrition in the World report, which estimated that "130 million more people may face chronic hunger by the end of this year", with the Secretary-General noting that in much of the world, "hunger remains deeply entrenched and is rising". On 14 July, as part of the Ministerial Segment of the High-level Political Forum on Sustainable Development, the UN Secretary-General admits that the planet was not on track year to deliver the Sustainable Development Goals by 2030, stating that "our world is in turmoil", due to the pandemic being "a massive global challenge" and noting that there were 12 million infections, 550,000 deaths, hundreds of millions of jobs lost, and the sharpest decline in per capita income since 1870, with approximately 265 million people facing food insecurity by the end of 2020, double the number before the pandemic. The Secretary-General called on Member States to "turn the tide".

On 17 July 2020, the Secretary-General, speaking during the High-Level Segment of the UN ECOSOC session to review progress towards achieving the United Nations Sustainable Development Agenda for 2030, stated that COVID-19 highlighted the need for "renewed, inclusive multilateralism" and leadership by ECOSOC, the UN's main body for deliberative and innovative strategizing. On 22 July 2020, the COVID-19 Law Lab initiative was launched. It gathers and shares legal documents from over 190 countries across the world to help states establish and implement strong legal frameworks to manage the pandemic. On 23 July 2020, the Secretary-General highlighted that the pandemic could provide a new opportunity to resolve long-standing conflicts and address structural problems in the Arab world. On 28 July, the Secretary-General launches the latest UN policy brief, COVID-19 in an Urban World, noting that cities were 'ground zero' for the pandemic and stating "Now is the moment to adapt to the reality of this and future pandemics". On 30 July, the Secretary-General releases his latest policy brief on the coronavirus crisis (The Impact of COVID-19 on South-East Asia), which examines impacts on the 11 countries in Southeast Asia and makes recommendations for a path to sustainable, inclusive recovery that prioritises gender equality.

==== August ====
On 3 August 2020, the Secretary-General issued recommendations to get children back in the classroom in a new UNESCO policy brief 'Education During COVID-19 And Beyond: The Future Of Education Is Here', launched alongside a new global campaign called Save our Future, as the UN estimated 1 billion children were affected by school closures in July. On 12 August, the Secretary-General briefed the UN Security Council on sustainable peace and the progress of the global ceasefire, warning that COVID-19 threatened hard-won development and peacebuilding gains and "risks exacerbating conflicts or fomenting new ones". On 24 August, the Secretary-General launched his latest policy brief, on tourism, calling for the vital global tourism sector to be rebuilt in a "safe, equitable and climate friendly way". On 31 August, addressing a virtual town hall with young women from NGOs, part of the annual session of the Commission on the Status of Women, coordinated by UN Women, the UN Secretary-General stated that the COVID-19 pandemic had reversed decades of fragile progress on gender equality and women's rights.

==== September ====
On 2 September 2020, the Secretary-General, at one of a series of the Aqaba Process international meetings of heads of state to improve global cooperation in fighting terrorism and violent extremism, warned the world had "entered a volatile and unstable new phase" in terms of the impact of COVID-19 on peace and security. On 3 September, the Secretary-General called for concerted and meaningful action, especially from the G20, to make COVID recovery 'a true turning point' for people and planet, and outlined six climate-positive actions for a sustainable recovery. On 9 September, the Secretary General, launching a new report United in Science 2020, stated that greenhouse gases levels were at record levels, while emissions that had temporarily declined because of the coronavirus pandemic were returning to pre-COVID levels, as global temperatures hit new highs. On 10 September, he warned an Ambassadors meeting for a virtual High-Level Forum on the Culture of Peace that due to the pandemic "Not since the United Nations was founded have we faced such a complex and multidimensional threat to global peace and security". On 22 September, the concept of "vaccinationalism" was introduced by the Secretary-General, who warned nations against making side-deals in their interests to safeguard the health of their own populations, which would ultimately be self-defeating. On 29 September, the UN Secretary-General called the millionth death from COVID-19 an "agonizing milestone", affirmed the importance of every individual life, and called for solidarity in the global recovery. He also welcomed the G20's Debt Service Suspension Initiative and called for greater effort to prevent a global recession and urged greater efforts against the 'global scourge' of gender-based violence, which had been intensified by the pandemic. On 30 September, he called on Member States to fund COVID-19 global vaccine efforts, reporting that $3 billion of $35 billion had been secured for the Access to COVID-19 Tools.

==== October ====
On 1 October, the Secretary-General launched the Annual Report of the United Nations, which included a special section devoted to the pandemic; he notes that pandemic recovery must be measured in "human rather than economic terms". On 7 October, the Secretary-General's policy brief 'COVID-19 and Universal Health Coverage' was released, stressing the importance of basic public health, strong health systems, and equitable access to health services. The next day, he highlighted that "inadequate" global health care systems had contributed to the million deaths from the pandemic so far, stressing that universal health care was a key recommendation in the brief. On 10 October, he warned greater global cooperation was required, by Member States signing the UN Convention against Transnational Organized Crime, to prevent criminals from profiteering from COVID-19. On 17 October, the Secretary-General, marking the International Day for the Eradication of Poverty, called for solidarity with people living in poverty during and after the COVID-19 pandemic, highlighting that "a double crisis" of the highest risk of exposure and the least access to healthcare was facing the world's poorest, and warning that 115 million could fall into poverty in 2020, the first increase in decades.

== General Assembly ==
The General Assembly has passed two resolutions directly addressing the coronavirus pandemic. The first, on 2 April 2020 (A/RES/74/270), on 'Global solidarity to fight the coronavirus disease 2019 (COVID-19)', reaffirms the General Assembly's commitment to international cooperation and multilateralism and expresses "strong support for the central role of the United Nations system". In addition, it emphasizes the need for human rights to be respected during the pandemic; expresses condolences to the families of those affected; thanks and offers support to medical staff; calls for "intensified international cooperation to contain, mitigate and defeat the pandemic," including via the World Health Organization; renews its commitment to help the most vulnerable; reaffirms its commitment to the UN decade of action and to sustainable development; expresses optimism for the future; and calls upon the United Nations System, led by the United Nations Secretary-General, "to work with all relevant actors in order to mobilize a coordinated global response to the pandemic and its adverse social, economic and financial impact on all societies."

The second resolution, passed on 20 April 2020 (A/RES/74/274) on 'International cooperation to ensure global access to medicines, vaccines and medical equipment to face COVID-19' urges international cooperation on equitable global access to medical equipment, treatment, and vaccines.

To uphold its mandates, perform essential services and ensure continuity, the Assembly adopted innovative working procedures, most notably the 'silence procedure', which provides Member States with at least 72 hours to raise objections on a draft resolution or decision, also allowing countries to outline their positions.

One 2 June 2020, the President of the General assembly, Tijani Muhammad-Bande, called for UN Member States to place human rights at the heart of their ongoing response to COVID-19 and ensure that everyone can enjoy "justice and peace".

Two resolutions (A/RES/74/306) 'Comprehensive and coordinated response to the COVID-19 pandemic' and (A/RES/74/307) the 'United response against global health threats: combating COVID-19' were adopted on 11 September 2020, where the Assembly called for intensified international cooperation and multilateral efforts in handling disease outbreaks, including by sharing timely, accurate and transparent information, exchanging epidemiological and clinical data, sharing materials necessary for research and development.

== Security Council ==
The Security Council passed one resolution directly addressing the coronavirus pandemic, on 1 July 2020: S/RES/2532 'Maintenance of international peace and security', demanding a global ceasefire to provide humanitarian access to the world's most vulnerable in conflict zones. On 24 September 2020, the Security Council hosted a Summit-level debate on the theme 'Maintenance of International Peace and Security: Global Governance after COVID-19' to discuss further the need for global governance reform to strengthen convergence towards sustainable global peace and security.

In September 2020, at a UN Security Council meeting to discuss challenges related to "Post-COVID-19 Global Governance," after other members of the Security Council veered off onto other topics only tangentially related to the virus, US Ambassador to the United Nations Kelly Craft criticized them for using a COVID-19 meeting to focus on what she called "political grudges," rather than the pandemic. She said: "You know, shame on each of you. I am astonished and I am disgusted by the content of today's discussion. I am actually really quite ashamed of this council – members of the council who took this opportunity to focus on political grudges rather than the critical issue at hand."

== United Nations System responses ==
In a joint statement on 13 October, the Food and Agriculture Organization, International Fund for Agricultural Development, International Labour Organization, and World Health Organization called for "global solidarity and support, especially with the most vulnerable in our societies" and highlighted that tens of millions of people, especially in the developing world, risk falling into extreme poverty, with nearly half of the global 3.3 billion workforce at risk of losing their jobs.

=== Food and Agriculture Organization (FAO) ===
The FAO and partner agencies have been warning of an increase in hunger since June. On 16 June 2020, the UN's office for Latin America and the Caribbean (ECLAC), together with the FAO, proposed in a new study 10 measures to avoid increased hunger in the region, including through an "anti-hunger grant", as they warn those living in extreme poverty in the region could surpass 83 million by the end of 2020 due to the impacts of the pandemic. On 14 July 2020 Qu Dongyu, Director-General of the FAO, launched its comprehensive COVID-19 Response and Recovery Programme to ward off a global food emergency during and after the pandemic and to provide "medium to long-term development responses for food security and nutrition", costing an initial $1.2 billion investment. On 17 July, the WFP and FAO jointly warned that hunger threatened "to soar to devastating levels in 25 countries in the coming months", pushing the world poorest "closer to the abyss" of famine. On 29 July, the FAO issued a 'call to action' highlighting the plight of hundreds of millions of smallholder family farmers in Asia-Pacific, who produce the majority of the world's food, and whose livelihoods are disproportionately suffering due to the pandemic. On 21 August, the FAO and the World Food Programme, citing data showing that over 3 million people are facing acute food insecurity due to COVID-19 and conflict, called for urgent, sustained humanitarian action in Burkina Faso.

=== International Labour Organization (ILO) ===
The ILO has been warning of mass global unemployment since March. On 18 March 2020, the ILO released projections showing that millions of people will fall out of employment due to the pandemic and called for an internationally coordinated policy response, as had happened in the 2008 financial crisis, to significantly lower the impact on global unemployment. On 28 April, the ILO issued its ILO Monitor Third Edition: COVID-19 and the World of Work, reporting that approximately 1.6 billion people employed in the informal economy, i.e., nearly half the global workforce, could see their livelihoods destroyed due to the lockdown responses to the spread of COVID-19, while over 430 million enterprises in hard-hit sectors risked "serious disruption". Marking the World Day for Safety and Health at Work, the ILO issued a second new report, Ensuring Safety and Health at Work, urging countries to take action to prevent and control COVID-19 in the workplace. On 27 May, the ILO warned in a new report that more than one in six young people had stopped working since the beginning of the pandemic, creating a 'lockdown generation'.

On 12 June 2020, the Director-General of the ILO, marking the World Day Against Child Labour, warns that huge gains made towards ending child labour over the previous two decades risked being reversed by the COVID-19 pandemic. On 30 June, the Director-General of the ILO, commenting on new ILO data showing that working hours fell 14 per cent during the second quarter of 2020, stated that the impact of the COVID-19 crisis on jobs has been much worse than initially expected, appealing to governments, workers and employers to agree on a sustainable economic recovery plan to reduce the inequalities revealed by the pandemic. On 8 July, the UN Secretary General states at the ILO-organized 'The Global Summit', part of a five-day virtual event that is addressing the coronavirus pandemic, that decent jobs must fuel the COVID-19 recovery to "build back better". On 23 September, the ILO reported on the occasion of the sixth edition of its 'COVID Monitor' that COVID-19 has had a "catastrophic" impact on workers, equivalent to 495 million full-time jobs lost globally in the second quarter of the year, with lower and middle-income countries suffering most.

On 15 October, the ILO and the UN Economic and Social Commission for Asia and the Pacific, in a new report focusing on the pandemic highlighted that over half of the people in the Asia-Pacific region do not have any social safety net, causing ill-health, inequality, poverty, and social exclusion. On 21 October, new ILO report warned that the COVID-19 pandemic had resulted in "government lockdowns, collapsed consumer demand, and disrupted imports of raw materials", heavily impacting the Asia Pacific garment industry.

=== International Monetary Fund (IMF) ===
The IMF has warned of the largest global depression since the Great Depression. On 4 March 2020, UN economists at UNCTAD, World Bank and the IMF announced a likely $50 billion drop in worldwide manufacturing exports in February, together with an IMF pledge of support for vulnerable countries. On 25 March, the World Bank and IMF called for a global debt payment suspension in light of the COVID-19 pandemic. On 14 April, forecasting the "worst economic downturn since the Great Depression", the IMF reported that growth for 2020 was likely to be minus three per cent, a dramatic change since the January World Economic Outlook report.

On 24 June 2020, the IMF in its latest World Economic Outlook report warned that the economic recovery from the COVID-19 pandemic was projected to be slower than previously forecast, with growth in 2020 estimated at −4.9 per cent, or nearly two percentage points below April projections, indicating a deeper recession and slower recovery. On 12 July, the IMF called for tax systems to be reformed, including to reduce tax avoidance and tax evasion reduced, to ensure an equitable economic recovery from the pandemic.

=== International Organization for Migration (IOM) ===
The IOM and related agencies have warned about the severe health and socioeconomic implications for migrants and refugees. On 17 March, UN agencies the IOM and the UN refugee agency, UNHCR, announced they had temporarily halted resettlement travel for refugees. On 1 April, the UNHCR and IOM jointly emphasized that the COVID-19 emergency was compounding the already desperate situation for many refugees and migrants from Venezuela. On 2 April, the IOM sounded the alarm over conditions in crowded reception centres in Greece as the first migrants test positive for COVID-19. On 15 April 2020, the IOM expanded the scope of its Global Strategic Preparedness and Response Plan to include major interventions aiming to mitigate the severe health and socio-economic impacts of the pandemic.

On 21 July 2020, the IOM warned that fear of the COVID-19 pandemic was causing fresh displacement in war-torn Yemen. The IOM and International Chamber of Commerce released new employer guidance for measures to protect migrant workers.

=== International Telecommunication Union (ITU) ===
The ITU has led global efforts to secure the stability of global networks, warn against 5G misinformation, and bridge the increasing digital divide. On 23 March 2020, the ITU launched a new platform to assist global networks under increasing strain and facing rising demand during the pandemic to remain "safer, stronger and more connected". On 22 April, the ITU confirmed that 5G was in no way responsible for the spread of the COVID-19 virus. On 4 May, the ITU outlined the implications of the pandemic, warning that it was essential to bridge the digital divide for the 3.6 billion off-line people, as internet traffic tripled.

=== Office of the High Commissioner for Human Rights (OHCHR) ===
The High Commissioner for Human Rights has consistently warned of the negative effects of the COVID-19 pandemic on human rights, especially for the most vulnerable, beginning in March 2020. On 6 March, the High Commissioner appealed for business to put rights "front and centre" when implementing preventative measures to avoid impacting the poorest in society. On 24 March, the High Commissioner called for an easing of sanctions against countries under sanctions, like Iran, to "allow their medical systems to fight the disease and limit its global spread". On 25 March, the High Commissioner urged quick action by governments to prevent COVID-19 from devastating prisons and other places of detention.

On 2 April 2020, the High Commissioner for Human Rights warned of the plight of hundreds of thousands of now unemployed migrant workers in India, calling for 'domestic solidarity' in the coronavirus battle. On 3 April, the High Commissioner welcomed the decision by many governments to release hundreds of thousands of prisoners to slow the transmission of the new coronavirus within prison systems. On 7 April, the High Commissioner issued new guidance setting out key actions to protect LGBTI people against discrimination during the COVID-19 pandemic. On 24 April, the High Commissioner expressed alarm over press clampdowns stifling the free flow information in some countries. On 27 April, the High Commissioner warned of a 'toxic lockdown culture' of state repression and stated that emergency powers "should not be a weapon governments can wield to quash dissent, control the population, and even perpetuate their time in power". On 8 May 2020, the High Commissioner warned that some parties to the conflict in Syria, including ISIL terrorist fighters, may be using the COVID-19 pandemic as "an opportunity to regroup and inflict violence on the population". On 14 May, the High Commissioner warned of potential risks as more countries moved to lift lockdowns to contain COVID-19 spread. On 20 May, the High Commissioner and the Chairperson of the African Commission on Human and Peoples' Rights issued a joint call for urgent measures to reduce the ripple effects of COVID-19 on Africa's most vulnerable, warning that hoping it would go away would not work.

On 2 June 2020, the High Commissioner called for urgent action to address "the major disproportionate impact" of COVID-19 on racial and ethnic minorities, including people of African descent. On 3 June, the High Commissioner urged Asian-Pacific countries to honour the right to freedom of expression, following an alarming clampdown on freedom of expression during the COVID-19 crisis. On 10 July, the High Commissioner warned that Lebanon was "fast spiralling out of control", resulting in destitution and starvation, due to socioeconomic shocks from the pandemic. On 24 July, the OHCHR reminded authorities in Zimbabwe that the coronavirus pandemic should not be used as "an excuse to clamp down on fundamental freedoms". On 7 August, as the Americas remained the epicenter of the COVID-19 pandemic, and on the International Day of the World's Indigenous Peoples, the High Commissioner affirmed "the need to ensure the world's indigenous people have control over their own communities", given the "critical threat" of COVID-19 to indigenous peoples.

On 6 October, the OHCHR called on Iran to release imprisoned lawyers, human rights defenders, and political prisoners, citing concerns over the situation they are facing and the risk of their contracting COVID-19. The same day, the OHCHR, the UN Global Compact and the UN Working Group on Business and Human Rights issued a joint statement calling for business to aid 400,000 seafarers stranded by the pandemic.

=== UNAIDS ===
On 14 May 2020, UNAIDS initiated a petition from global leaders requesting that when a successful COVID-19 vaccine is developed, it be available free to all. On 27 August 2020, UNAIDS warned in a new report, Rights in a Pandemic – Lockdowns, Rights and Lessons from HIV in the Early Response to COVID-19, that some of the world's most marginalized communities have experienced violence and other rights abuses during the COVID-19 pandemic.

=== United Nations Conference on Trade and Development (UNCTAD) ===
UNCTAD has warned of a massive collapse in trade in 2020. On 4 March 2020, UN economists at UNCTAD, the World Bank and the IMF announced a likely $50 billion drop in worldwide manufacturing exports in February, together with an IMF pledge of support for vulnerable countries. The UN's top economist, Pamela Coke-Hamilton (UNCTAD), warned against panic. On 9 March, UNCTAD stated that the economic uncertainty caused by the virus would likely cost the global economy $1 trillion in 2020. On 26 March, UNCTAD reported via its latest Investment Trends Monitor that foreign direct investment flows were likely to drop by 30–40 per cent during 2020, and into 2021, reflecting a far more serious economic situation than initially projected. The 2020 Trade and Development report by UNCTAD, says that the coronavirus pandemic was a catalyst for rather than the cause of the current economic crisis. It attempts to expose the hyper-inequalities that existed after the 2008 financial crisis. The 2020 Trade and Development report by UNCTAD, says that the coronavirus pandemic was a catalyst for rather than the cause of the current economic crisis. The report documents the hyper-inequalities that existed after the 2008 financial crisis. On 21 October, UNCTAD, announcing its latest update, warned that global trade was frail, with an uncertain outlook.

=== United Nations Economic and Social Council (ECOSOC) ===
UN ECOSOC, responsible for strategizing the UN economic and social response to the pandemic, has warned of the impact of the pandemic on achieving the United Nations Sustainable Development Goals (UNSDGs). On 8 May 2020, ECOSOC warned that the COVID-19 outbreak could trigger a humanitarian catastrophe in Haiti. On 11 May, ECOSOC held a wide-ranging policy discussion 'Joining Forces: Effective Policy Solutions for COVID-19 Response', stressing a range of multilateral solutions, while also committing to getting back on track for the Sustainable Development Goals. On 2 June, at an ECOSOC Financing for Development Forum, exploring financing options to address the pandemic and mobilize the resources needed for a proactive recovery, Deputy Secretary-General Amina J. Mohammed informed delegates that 'unprecedented' financing was needed to halt a recession of 'unparalleled proportions'.

On 6 July, at a High-Level Political Forum to discuss post-pandemic recovery, Mr. Mher Margaryan, vice-president of ECOSOC, announced that the future of the SDGs would "depend on our policy choices today" on the global resolve to act in solidarity. On 7 July, Mona Juul, President of ECOSOC, addressed the inaugural meeting of the High-level Political Forum on Sustainable Development, noting that the dramatic impacts of the COVID-19 pandemic had revealed "weaknesses in our systems and societies", and warned that "a new dynamic" was needed to address the negative shocks. On 23 July, the incoming ECOSOC President, Ambassador Munir Akram of Pakistan, outlined a triple focus on the pandemic, the SDGs, and climate action.

=== United Nations Educational Scientific and Cultural Organization (UNESCO) ===
UNESCO has highlighted the need to fight COVID-19 misinformation and the plight of children's education during the pandemic and attempted to address this through research and policy briefs. On 5 March 2020 UNESCO announced that 290 million students globally were stuck at home. On 10 March, UNESCO highlighted the unprecedented shuttering of schools globally.

On 6 April 2020, UNESCO invited young innovators, data scientists and designers, especially those now out of school, to join a month-long hackathon, CodeTheCurve, to provide digital solutions to the global pandemic. On 13 April, UNESCO warned of unreliable and false information about the COVID-19 pandemic, terming it a global 'disinfodemic'. On 21 April, new data from UNESCO and partners revealed extreme divides in digitally-based distance learning for most of the world's students now at home due to COVID-19, as half of all students out of the classroom (nearly 830 million learners globally) lacked access to a computer, with over 40 per cent having no home Internet. On 29 April, UNESCO, UNICEF, and the World Bank, acting as part of the Global Education Coalition, issued new guidelines to assist governments in making decisions on safely reopening schools for 1.3 billion students affected by closures. On 4 May 2020, at a UNESCO-led event to mark World Press Freedom Day, the UN Secretary-General noted that journalists are key to countering the "dangerous outbreak of misinformation" accompanying the COVID-19 pandemic, including harmful health advice, hate speech, wild conspiracy theories, and "blatant lies". On 18 May, on International Museum Day, UNESCO revealed that nearly 90 per cent of cultural institutions had had to close, while almost 13 per cent were seriously threatened with never reopening.

On 3 July 2020, UNESCO stated that increased pillaging of endangered World Heritage Sites during COVID-19 lockdowns would likely result in a large number of stolen artefacts appearing online. On 13 July, with UN estimates of 1 billion children being outside schooling due to the pandemic, Audrey Azoulay, Director-General of UNESCO, highlighted the need to ensure education for refugee children. On 3 August 2020, UNESCO launched a new UNESCO policy brief 'Education During COVID-19 And Beyond: The Future Of Education Is Here', alongside a new global campaign Save our Future.

=== United Nations Environment Programme (UNEP) ===
The UNEP has commented on the collapse of the fossil fuel industry and warned of further zoonotic pandemics. On 10 June 2020, the UNEP and partners released a new report, Global Trends in Renewable Energy Investment 2020, showing that renewable energy was more cost-effective than ever, as COVID-19 impacted the fossil fuel industry, "providing an opportunity to prioritize clean energy in national economic recovery packages and bring the world closer to meeting the goals of the Paris Agreement".

On 6 July 2020, a joint United Nations Environment Programme (UNEP) and International Livestock Research Institute (ILRI) report warned that the world could expect to see other animal-to-human transmission by diseases and stated that there was still time to prevent further zoonotic pandemics.

=== United Nations High Commission for Refugees (UNHCR) ===
The UNHRC has warned of a severe impact on refugees and has been attempting to mitigate this impact through policies and securing funding. On 1 April 2020, the UN High Commissioner for Refugees outlined a series of measures the UNHRC was taking to respond to the coronavirus public health emergency and prevent further spread, especially those to reinforce health and the 'WASH' systems (water, sanitation and hygiene), including distributing soap and increasing water access. The UNHCR and IOM jointly emphasized that the worldwide COVID-19 emergency is compounding the already desperate situation for many refugees and migrants from Venezuela. On 3 April, in a joint statement, the UNHCR, the IOM, the OHCHR and the WHO stressed that "refugees, migrants and displaced persons are at heightened risk of contracting the new coronavirus disease" as health systems threaten to be overwhelmed. On 20 April, Gillian Triggs, the Assistant High Commissioner for Protection, warned of the urgent need to protect "refugee, displaced and stateless women and girls at the time of this pandemic".

On 15 May 2020, the UNHCR reported the first COVID-19 cases in the Cox's Bazar Rohingya refugee camps. The UN Office of the High Commissioner for Refugees warned that coronavirus lockdowns in Central America were being exploited by criminal gangs. On 21 May, the WHO and UNHCR signed a new pact, an update and expansion of a 1997 agreement, funded by the COVID-19 Solidarity Response Fund, to better protect approximately 70 million people affected by COVID-19 in low and middle-income countries with vulnerable health systems. On 16 June 2020, the UNHCR warned of the worsening refugee crisis in Syria, as "another 200,000 refugees just in this period of three months who because of the impact needed emergency assistance".

=== United Nations Human Rights Council (UNHRC) ===
The UNHRC has warned of the impact on individual human rights. On 26 March, a group of 42 experts representing nearly every independent rights specialist working within the UNHRC-mandated system stressed that in addition to public health and emergency measures to counter the COVID-19 pandemic, countries had to respect the fundamental individual human rights. On 16 July, the UNHRC noted a global rise in women prisoners that was accelerating faster than the rate of male prisoners and that COVID measures were "making sentences worse". On 31 March, Hilal Elver, the United Nations Special Rapporteur on the Right to Food, part of the Special Procedures of the Human Rights Council, issued a statement noting that the continued imposition of sanctions, especially on Syria, Venezuela, Iran, Cuba and Zimbabwe, were seriously impacting the fundamental right to sufficient and adequate food. on 7 August 2020, Special Rapporteurs and Independent Experts, part of the Special Procedures of the Human Rights Council, again called on countries to ease or lift sanctions to allow affected countries and communities "like Cuba, Iran, Sudan, Syria, Venezuela and Yemen" access vital supplies in the fight against the COVID-19 pandemic. On 24 August, UN Special Rapporteurs and Independent Experts on human rights raised alarm over "grave and unnecessary" risks of catching COVID-19 faced by imprisoned human rights defenders facing lengthy pre-trial detention in Egypt.

=== United Nations Children's Fund (UNICEF) ===
UNICEF has been active since March 2020, in offering advice and conducting research on the impact of the coronavirus on children, highlighting especially the plight of vulnerable children, including child refugees, in fragile states, particularly the problem of maintaining routine vaccination. On 17 March 2020, UNICEF issued advice on how parents and carers can talk to children about the coronavirus. On 23 March, UNICEF and its relief partners in Syria warned that disruptions to water in the country's war-battered north-east could worsen the risks posed by the pandemic. On 26 March, the Director-General of UNICEF highlighted that life-saving vaccinations must not "fall victim" to the COVID-19 pandemic. On 31 March, UNICEF warned that COVID-19 would seriously impact the health care system in the Democratic Republic of the Congo, already battling deadly measles and cholera epidemics that had resulted in the deaths of thousands of children.

On 1 April 2020, the executive director of UNICEF warned that an outbreak of COVID-19 in the world's refugee camps was "looking imminent". On 13 April, UNICEF, the WHO, and other health partners supporting the Measles & Rubella Initiative (M&RI) warned that over 117 million children in 37 countries risked missing out on a measles vaccine. UNICEF also warned that hundreds of thousands of children in detention were at "grave risk" of contracting COVID-19, calling for their urgent release. On 14 April, Henrietta Fore, executive director of UNICEF, warned of online predators putting millions of children at risk during COVID-19 pandemic lockdowns. On 15 April, UNICEF warned that 250 million children globally living in the "waking nightmare" of conflict desperately needed warring parties to adopt the UN Secretary General's call for a global ceasefire as the COVID-19 pandemic spreads. On 20 April, the executive director of UNICEF, and the UN High Commissioner for Refugees issued a joint statement pledging to accelerate work to expand refugee children's access to protection, education, clean water and sanitation. On 26 April, at the start of World Immunization Week, UNICEF warned that millions of children were in danger of missing life-saving vaccines against measles, diphtheria and polio due to disruptions in immunization as the world attempted to slow COVID-19 transmission. On 30 April, climate activist Greta Thunberg and Danish NGO Human Act launched a child rights-driven campaign to support UNICEF in protecting children's lives during the COVID-19 pandemic.

On 1 May 2020, UNICEF warned of 'vaccine bottlenecks' and requested urgent help to distribute vaccines worldwide amid dramatic shortages because of COVID-19 restrictions. On 11 May, three senior UN officials in the Middle East, including from UNICEF and the UN Human Rights Office, jointly called for the release of Palestinian children from Israeli-run prisons and detentions centres, due to the risk of COVID-19 infection. On 12 May, UNICEF warned that the health crisis was "quickly becoming a child rights crisis", requesting $1.6 billion to support its humanitarian response for children affected by the pandemic, as without it, an additional 6,000 under-fives could die daily. On 15 May, UNICEF in the Democratic Republic of the Congo warned coronavirus restrictions affecting vaccinations could result in a resurgence in deadly childhood diseases like "polio, chickenpox, measles, yellow fever, hepatitis B, diphtheria, tetanus, whooping cough and meningitis". On 21 May, UNICEF warned that migrant children forcibly returned from the United States to Mexico and Central America were facing danger and discrimination worsened by the COVID-19 pandemic.

On 4 June 2020, UNICEF warned that with nearly 1.2 billion children out of school globally due to the pandemic, the digital divide threatened to deepen the global crisis in learning. On 12 June, UNICEF warned that children in the Yemen, "the world's worst humanitarian disaster" urgently need basic services, as over eight million Yemenis, nearly half of them children, directly depended on the agency for water, sanitation and hygiene (WASH) during the ongoing conflict, cholera outbreaks and pandemic, with the $479 million appeal for Yemen being less than 40 per cent funded. The agency warned that unless it received $30 million by the end of June, WASH operations for four million people would shut down. On 26 June, UNICEF warned in a new report that the number of malnourished children in Yemen could reach 2.4 million by the end of 2020, due to huge shortfalls in humanitarian aid funding amid the coronavirus pandemic.

On 15 July 2020, the World Health Organization and UNICEF called for immediate efforts to vaccinate all children to avoid the pandemic worsening access, a problem affecting over 100 countries. On 3 August, UNICEF warned that storms and coronavirus posed a 'double threat' for children in Central America and Caribbean. On 20 August, the WHO and UNICEF, citing a survey and other research, urged African governments to promote a safe return of schoolchildren to classrooms while limiting spread of COVID-19. On 3 September, UNICEF in a new report warned that the world's richest nations must protect child well-being in terms of COVID-19 fallout, with children suffering from mental health concerns, obesity and poor social and academic skills. On 4 September, UNICEF announced that it will be leading global procurement and fair and equitable supply of COVID-19 vaccinations when they are available.

On 15 October, releasing new statistics, UNICEF estimated that 40 per cent of the global population, or circa three billion people, do not possess home hand-washing facilities, despite soap and water being vital in combating COVID-19 and other infectious diseases. The next day, UNICEF reported that an increase in armed violence, combined with the socioeconomic impact of the COVID-19 pandemic, were contributing to the worsening plight of children in the Central Sahel, where 7.2 million in Burkina Faso, Mali and Niger needed humanitarian assistance, a significant two-thirds increase in one year. On 20 October, a new UNICEF/World Bank Group analysis indicated that the number of children in extreme poverty, i.e., 356 million globally before the COVID-19 pandemic began, will likely worsen significantly.

=== United Nations Office on Drugs and Crime (UNODC) ===
The UNODC has warned of a worsening of human trafficking and of the trafficking of faulty medical equipment, whilst noting a disruption to global drug trafficking. On 6 May, new analysis by the UNODC suggested that coronavirus containment measures were placing victims of human trafficking at risk of further exploitation, including by organized crime networks. On 25 June, the UNODC released its annual report, noting that over 35 million people globally now suffer from drug addiction, with the report also analyzing the far-reaching impact of the coronavirus pandemic on global drug markets.

On 8 July 2020, new UNODC research warned of a surge in the trafficking of substandard and faulty medical products, due to COVID-19.

=== United Nations Population Fund (UNFPA) ===
The UNFPA has warned of serious impacts on women and girls, including millions of unintended pregnancies. On 27 March 2020, the executive director of the UNFPA pledged support for those suffering from invisible impacts of the pandemic, including women and girls with disrupted access to life-saving sexual and reproductive health care. On 24 April, the UNFPA and WHO reported that lessons learned during the Ebola outbreak in Liberia six years previously were helping it to confront COVID-19. On 28 April, the UNFPA and partners released new data suggesting ongoing lockdowns and major disruptions to health services during the COVID-19 pandemic could result in seven million unintended pregnancies in the next few months.

On 11 July 2020, as part of World Population Day, the UNFPA again warned of seven million unintended pregnancies and approximately 31 million additional cases of gender-based violence to come by the end of 2020.

=== United Nations Women ===
Despite women's enormous contributions to mitigating the impacts of the COVID-19 pandemic, the crisis is threatening to erase decades of progress for women and girls. On 27 April 2020 Deputy Secretary-General Amina Mohammed launches a new women-led initiative to mobilize support to save lives and protect livelihoods in the face of COVID-19, 'Rise for All', a social and economic recovery initiative to bring women leaders together in calling the world to action in support of the UN Response and Recovery Fund and Framework. On 14 July, Amina Mohammed emphasized the importance of the 'Women Rise for All' UN forum in shaping leadership in pandemic response and recovery. On 1 September, a new UN Women report, From Insights to Action: Gender Equality in the wake of COVID-19, noted that the COVID-19 pandemic and its economic consequences will likely force an additional 47 million more women into poverty, reversing decades of progress to eliminate extreme poverty. On 28 September, UN Women announced that new data co-released by the UN Development Programme from the COVID-19 Global Gender Response Tracker revealed that the majority of countries were not sufficiently protecting women and girls from the COVID-19 related economic and social fallout. UN Women and UNDP have joined forces and on 8 October launched the Global COVID-19 Gender Response Tracker, which compiles and analyzes over 2,500 policy measures across 206 countries and territories.

=== World Bank ===
The World Bank and related agencies like the IMF have played a major role in the global financial response to the pandemic. On 4 March 2020, UN economists at UNCTAD, the World Bank and the IMF announced a likely $50 billion drop in worldwide manufacturing exports in February, together with an IMF pledge of support for vulnerable countries. On 25 March, the World Bank and IMF call for a global debt payment suspension in light of the COVID-19 pandemic. On 5 June, the World Bank stated in its latest Global Economic Prospects report.that the COVID-19 pandemic would shrink the global economy by 5.2 per cent in 2020, the deepest recession since World War Two, triggering a dramatic rise in extreme poverty.

On 27 July 2020, the World Bank's Chief Economist for Africa, Albert Zeufack, launched a new World Bank report, urging African nations to adopt the African Continental Free Trade Area as part of coronavirus economic mitigation measures, due to its potential to increase regional income by around $450 billion. On 29 July, the World Bank announced $4 billion in funding to increase the production and distribution of healthcare equipment, including personal protective equipment, ventilators and coronavirus testing kits, to assist developing countries in fighting the pandemic.

=== World Food Programme (WFP) ===
The WFP has warned of a massive increase in food insecurity in multiple regions, and especially in Africa, including due to famines and a lack of school meals, as a result of the pandemic and is coordinating a major UN response. On 20 March 2020, the Spokesperson for the UN Office for the Coordination of Humanitarian Affairs highlighted that UN global humanitarian assistance via the WFP would be critical for approximately 100 million people living in emergency situations, and life-saving food aid essential for 87 million people.

On 2 April 2020, the WFP warned that food insecurity levels for five million people in the Sahel region of Africa were "spiralling out of control", with the COVID-19 pandemic potentially impacting humanitarian supply chains. On 3 April, the WFP released a major report, 'COVID-19: Potential impact on the world's poorest people, noting that the global food chain is holding, while pointing out that food exports by major producers could be impacted if the exporting countries panicked. On 14 April, the first of the WFP and WHO "Solidarity Flights" carried urgently needed medical equipment to Africa, part of a UN-wide initiative. On 21 April, the executive director of the WFP warned the UN Security Council to act fast in the face of famines of "biblical proportions" in what was not only "a global health pandemic but also a global humanitarian catastrophe". On 29 April, the WFP and UNICEF urged governments to act immediately to support the futures of 370 million children globally depending on school meals.

On 5 May 2020, as COVID-19 restrictions worsened people's vulnerability, the WFP warned well over 40 million people across West Africa faced desperate food shortages. On 7 May, the updated UN Global Humanitarian Response Plan, backed by the WFP and other agencies, sought nearly $7 billion to protect the lives of millions of people and halt the transmission of COVID-19 in over 60 of the world's most fragile countries. On 28 May, the WFP released projections showing that approximately 14 million people in Latin America and the Caribbean could experience extreme food insecurity in 2020 due to the COVID-19 pandemic. On 9 June, the WFP warned that aid and funding of more than $182 million are urgently required for millions of people in Nigeria who had been severely impacted by the effects of the coronavirus pandemic, including conflict-hit communities "on life-support" in Nigeria's north-east.

On 9 July, the WFP and the UNHCR issued a joint alert calling attention to even greater food insecurity in Africa because of "aid disruption and rising food prices linked to the COVID-19 crisis". On 17 July, the WFP and FAO jointly warned that hunger threatened "to soar to devastating levels in 25 countries in the coming months", pushing the world poorest "closer to the abyss" of famine. On 30 July, the WFP urgently sought additional international support "to prevent millions of Zimbabweans plunging deeper into hunger" due to the COVID-19 pandemic aggravating an already severe hunger crisis in Zimbabwe. On 6 August, the WFP and governments announced that a flight carrying "protective masks, ventilators and other essential medical supplies for COVID-19 response" had landed in Papua New Guinea, commencing a humanitarian air service for the Pacific region.

=== World Health Organization (WHO) ===
The World Health Organization is a leading organization involved in the global coordination for mitigating the COVID-19 pandemic. On 5 January 2020, WHO notified the world about "pneumonia of unknown cause" in China and subsequently followed up with investigating the disease. On 20 January, WHO confirmed human-to-human transmission of the disease. On 28 February, WHO raised the global risk assessment of the infection to "very high". On 30 January, WHO declared the outbreak a Public Health Emergency of International Concern and warned all countries to prepare. On 11 March, WHO said that the outbreak constituted a pandemic. WHO has spearheaded several initiatives like COVID-19 Solidarity Response Fund for fundraising for the pandemic and Solidarity Trial for investigating potential treatment options for the disease. In responding to the outbreak, WHO has had to deal with political conflicts between member states, in particular between the United States and China. On 19 May, WHO agreed to an independent investigation into its handling of the pandemic.

=== World Tourism Organization (UNWTO) ===
On 17 April 2020, the UNWTO Secretary-General warned that tourism, which accounts for 10 per cent of global GDP, could lose millions of jobs but offered potential for an economic recovery. On 1 June, the UNWTO published research noting that countries were cautiously starting to ease travel restrictions. On 7 October, the WTO announced that global trade was showing signs of bouncing back from the COVID-19-induced depression, while warning that recovery could be severely disrupted by how the pandemic unfolds and how societies react.

=== Others ===
==== 2020 Timeline ====
- 1 March: The UN releases $15 million from the UN's Central Emergency Fund emergency funds to help vulnerable countries fight coronavirus COVID-19.
- 19 March: Speaking at an event hosted by Inter-American Dialogue, UN ECLAC Executive Secretary, Alicia Bárcena cautions that the coronavirus "will have devastating effects on the global economy", and that these effects will impact key economic development activities in Latin America and the Caribbean; particularly through sharp declines in exports, tourism, global value chains, prices of commodities and investment. She outlined some of the measures being taken by the region's governments to reduce such impacts and highlighted that vulnerable groups, such as the elderly, low income groups, and women needed protection.
- 20 March: Jens Laerke, Spokesperson for the UN Office for the Coordination of Humanitarian Affairs, highlights that UN global humanitarian assistance will be critical for approximately 100 million people living in emergency situations, and life-saving food aid essential for 87 million people, via the World Food Programme.
- 23 March: UN-Habitat announces the impacts of the pandemic could be considerably higher on urban poor living in slums, where overcrowding could prevent handwashing and recommended measures like social distancing and self-isolation.
- 24 March: United Nations Special Envoy to Syria Geir Pedersen calls for a country-wide truce to fight the pandemic.
- 25 March: The United Nations Secretary-General António Guterres launched the COVID-19 Global Humanitarian Response Plan.
- 26 March: Jeanine Hennis-Plasschaert, the United Nations Secretary-General's Special Representative for Iraq, issued a message urging citizens to support government efforts to halt further spread of COVID-19.
- 27 March: Baskut Tuncak, United Nations Special Rapporteur on the Implications for Human Rights of the Environmentally Sound Management and Disposal of Hazardous Substances and Wastes, calls on states and business leaders to ensure that 'health care heroes' working on the frontlines receives adequate protective equipment.
- 28 March: Nickolay Mladenov, the United Nations Special Coordinator for the Middle East Peace Process, praises the coordination between the Israeli and Palestine authorities for their reaction to the pandemic.
- 30 March: Fernand de Varennes, the United Nations Special Rapporteur on minority issues, issued a statement noting that COVID-19 was stoking xenophobia, hate and exclusion, including against Chinese and other Asians. The United Nations Group of Eminent International and Regional Experts on Yemen urged for a general release of inmates in Yemen to avert a nationwide coronavirus outbreak. The United Nations Special Envoy for Syria reiterated calls for a "complete, immediate nationwide ceasefire" as a response to the coronavirus.
- 31 March: The United Nations in Somalia, echoing the Secretary-General's call for "an immediate global ceasefire to put aside violence, mistrust, hostilities and animosity, and to focus on battling the virus, not each other", appealed to Somalis to "come together in this fight against the pandemic". The UN Deputy Special Representative for Afghanistan told Security Council members that, in the light of the COVID-19 pandemic, political parties in Afghanistan were being urged to prioritize national interests and join peace talks with the Taliban.
- 1 April: The UN Department of Economic and Social Affairs reports in a new analysis that the global economy could shrink by up to one per cent in 2020 due to the pandemic, or even further if restrictions on economic activities were continued without sufficient fiscal responses. The United Nations Economic and Social Commission for Western Asia issues a new policy brief noting COVID-19 will be responsible for pushing a further 8.3 million people in the Arab region into poverty. The UN system in Nigeria announces that it is working with its partners to reduce the spread of the coronavirus, especially in the northeast, where communities and camps house millions of internally displaced people uprooted by the Boko Haram insurgency. World Meteorological Organization (WMO) Secretary-General Petteri Taalas urges governments to support national early warning and weather observing capacities despite the "severe challenges" caused by COVID-19, as the WMO's Global Observing System comes under strain due to the lack of data from commercial airliners.
- 2 April: The United Nations postpones the COP26 climate summit to 'safeguard lives'.
- 4 April: The UN chief of peacekeeping operations Jean-Pierre Lacroix stresses that UN peacekeepers are continuing in their mission to help fragile countries navigate conflict and COVID-19, as he echoes the Secretary-General's call for an immediate global ceasefire. The United Nations reports it was forced to significantly scale back its activities on Mine Awareness Day, which usually involves football games on cleared minefields.
- 6 April: The UN Working Group of Experts on People of African Descent warned that structural discrimination could be worsening inequalities surrounding access to healthcare and treatment, potentially leading to a rise in disease and death rates among people of African descent.
- 7 April: Yacoub El Hillo, UN Resident and Humanitarian Coordinator in Libya echoes the UN Secretary General's call for a global ceasefire and demands fighting stop immediately if the country is to have any chance of warding off the COVID-19 outbreak, as he condemns an attack on a major Tripoli hospital. Independent UN human rights experts called on UN Member States to improve child protection measures to protect the welfare of "millions of children who may be more exposed to violence, sale, trafficking, sexual abuse and exploitation" during the pandemic.
- 9 April: In the 2020 Financing for Sustainable Development Report, the UN-led Inter-Agency Task Force on Financing for Development warns that billions of people in countries on the brink of economic collapse due to COVID-19 are being threatened further by a looming debt crisis, presenting recommendations based on joint research and analysis from more than 60 UN agencies and international institutions.
- 11 April: In a joint appeal, the five UN envoys to the Middle East urged the region's warring parties to work towards an immediate end to hostilities, emphasizing the Secretary-General's recent call for a global ceasefire during the COVID-19 pandemic.
- 13 April: UN ECLAC issues report with guidance for the conduct of household surveys and statistical publications by national statistical offices during the COVID-19 pandemic, with an emphasis on data collection on labour markets.
- 14 April: Imran Riza, UN Resident and Humanitarian Coordinator for Syria, warns of a major threat from the coronavirus threat, which has initiated a broad UN containment effort.
- 15 April: David Boyd, UN Special Rapporteur on Human Rights and the Environment, appealed for countries not to respond to COVID-19 by lower environmental standards.
- 17 April: Philip Alston, the UN Special Rapporteur on Extreme Poverty and Human Rights, warns that the United States must take urgent additional steps to prevent tens of millions of middle-class Americans impacted by the COVID-19 pandemic from being "plunged into poverty".
- 20 April: The UN's International Fund for Agricultural Development (IFAD) launches the Rural Poor Stimulus Facility, which aims to reduce the impact of COVID-19 on farmers and rural communities in developing countries.
- 21 April: A UN ECLAC report warns that the COVID-19 pandemic will result in the worst economic contraction in the history of Latin American and the Caribbean since the Great Depression, with a projected −5.3 per cent drop in activity in 2020.
- 24 April: The UN Office for the Coordination of Humanitarian Affairs calls for greater funding as it worked to set up basic handwashing stations, deliver clean drinking water and food, and launch public information campaigns on COVID-19, for 100 million people at risk.
- 30 April: UN special rapporteurs, independent experts and working groups issue a joint statement calling on the United States to lift its blockade on Cuba to save lives amid the expanding COVID-19 crisis.
- 30 April – A UN ECLAC report reviews the economic and social conditions of Persons With Disabilities in Latin America and the Caribbean and shares recommendations in various areas, including health, education, employment, accessibility and social protection for this vulnerable group. This document is part of a special collection of COVID-19 reports, which are available from the ECLAC Digital Repository.
- 1 May: The International Civil Aviation Organization releases figures warning of a potential overall reduction of 872 million international passengers to just over 1.3 billion in 2020.
- 5 May: The UN Special Rapporteur on the Contemporary Forms of Slavery warns that the COVID-19 pandemic is worsening global slavery.
- 6 May: UN FAO in collaboration with UN ECLAC published a bulletin that analyzed the effects of the COVID-19 pandemic on agricultural markets in Latin America and the Caribbean and identified the main measures implemented in LAC countries to minimize the impacts on food systems.
- 8 May: UN ECLAC reports that the region should make it a strategic objective to strengthen its productive capabilities in the pharmaceutical and medical supplies since it is highly dependent on imports and its main suppliers have restricted their medical exports.
- 11 May: The head of UNAIDS warns that two decades of treatment gains are under threat due to the pandemic.
- 13 May: The heads of the UN Office on Drugs and Crime, WHO, the UN High Commissioner for Human Rights, and UNAIDS warn of the heightened vulnerability to COVID-19 of detainees, urging governments to take "all appropriate public health measures" to protect them. A new UN report by UN ESCAP noted that the COVID-19 pandemic, due to shutdowns, could help improve the well-being of oceans in the Asia-Pacific region.
- 15 May: The UN emergency humanitarian relief agency (OCHA) warns that evacuation centres in the Philippines set up as a response to Typhoon Vongfong are creating the ideal conditions for COVID-19 transmission.
- 18 May: The UN Special Rapporteur on the Rights of Indigenous Peoples issue a statement expressing serious concern over the devastating impact of COVID-19 on Indigenous peoples beyond the simple health threat.
- 19 May: UN ECLAC made a number of recommendations in a note regarding bias problems that may arise in household surveys varied out during the COVID-19 pandemic.
- 20 May: UN FAO with UN ECLAC analyzed health risks to people in the food system value chain from workers to consumers due to the COVID-19 crisis.
- 22 May: The UN Office for the Coordination of Humanitarian Affairs warns that war-torn Yemen's health system has 'in effect, collapsed" in the face of a widening COVID-19 outbreak.
- 28 May: UN agencies and global partners announce they are seeking $2.41 billion to fight COVID-19 spread in Yemen and to support millions affected in the "world's worst humanitarian crisis".
- 2 June: Gilbert F. Houngbo, President of the International Fund for Agricultural Development, warns that due to the coronavirus, cross-border remittances will fall by 20 per cent, or $110 billion, to $445 billion, potentially causing tens of millions to fall below the poverty line and undermining progress towards fulfilling the 2030 Agenda for Sustainable Development.
- 4 June: Independent United Nations Special Rapporteurs on the right to housing, Balakrishnan Rajagopal, and on extreme poverty, Olivier De Schutter, urge the Indian Government to urgently comply with a Supreme Court order to ensure the wellbeing of more than 100 million migrant workers, after coronavirus measures leave them jobless, forcing them to travel long distances home.
- 5 June: The Under-Secretary-General for Peace Operations warns that in the Sahel African subregion, terrorist groups were exploiting the pandemic as they increased attacks on national and international peacekeeping forces.
- 11 June: At a virtual roundtable discussion, the Peace Operations chief, Jean-Pierre Lacroix, stresses the importance of prioritizing the UN's Action for Peacekeeping's (A4P) Women, Peace and Security (WPS) commitments during the pandemic as inequality increases as a result of the pandemic.
- 11 June: ECLAC continues to publish a series of recommendations for this period. This note includes recommendations for the continued collection of information linked to national accounts, balances-of-payments and foreign trade statistics.
- 16 June: The UN's office for Latin America and the Caribbean (ECLAC), together with the FAO, propose in a new study 10 measures to avoid increased hunger in the region, including through an "anti-hunger grant", as they warn those living in extreme poverty in the region could surpass 83 million by the end of 2020 due to the impacts of the pandemic.
- 21 June: The United Nations Assistance Mission to Afghanistan echoed the United Nations Secretary General's call for a global ceasefire, as it condemned 15 attacks on healthcare workers in the country recorded during the first two months of the COVID-19 pandemic. The UN celebrates the sixth annual International Day of Yoga, recognizing the ancient practice "as a holistic approach to health and wellbeing, and a powerful tool for dealing with the myriad stresses brought on by the COVID-19 pandemic".
- 22 June: UNAIDS warns that stocks of medication for HIV patients could be exhausted within the next two months, due to higher costs as a result of lockdowns and COVID-19 border closures.
- 30 June: On Social Media Day, the UN launches its Verified initiative, which calls on people globally to pause before sharing, to help stop the viral spread of COVID-19 misinformation.
- 2 July: The UN Department of Economic and Social Affairs urges countries' governments to do more support young entrepreneurs in the face of the pandemic as part of a sustainable recovery. Independent UN human rights expert Saad Alfarargi, Special Rapporteur on the Right to Development, at the second day of the High-level Political Forum on Sustainable Development, stated that the COVID-19 pandemic had resulted in "a serious setback" for the 2030 Agenda for Sustainable Development, urging prioritisation of the most vulnerable.
- 8 July: UN ECLAC provided a series of recommendations to step up the region's preparation for the economic recovery, while enhancing diversification as well as environmental and social sustainability.
- 9 July: Mohammed Ibn Chambas, Special Representative of the Secretary-General and Head of the United Nations Office for West Africa and the Sahel, warned that COVID-19 and climate change were fueling inter-communal violence and terrorist attacks and inflaming tensions in West Africa.
- 10 July: Vladimir Voronkov, head of the United Nations Office of Counter-Terrorism, echoes the United Nations Secretary-General in stating the "need to keep up the momentum" in terms of multilateral action to counter the global threat of terrorism during the pandemic, which is magnifying the threats.
- 14 July: United Nations Deputy Secretary-General Amina Mohammed emphasizes the importance of the 'Women Rise for All' UN forum in shaping leadership in pandemic response and recovery.
- 15 July: United Nation Youth Envoy Jayathma Wickramanayake, along with the World Health Organization and the UN Children's Fund, consider via webinar "how young people can maintain good mental health and a sense of wellbeing" during the pandemic.
- 16 July: Mark Lowcock, the United Nations' most senior humanitarian official, warns that the COVID-19 pandemic and resulting recession are set to cause the first increase in global poverty in three decades, pushing 265 million people to the point of starvation by the end of 2020, with an appeal to the G20 for $10.3 billion to fight the pandemic in 63 low-income countries.
- 19 July: The United Nations highlighted the plight of hundreds of thousands of seafarers stranded at sea, some for over a year, due to COVID-19 travel restrictions.
- 21 July: The United Nations Special Coordinator for the Middle East Peace Process warns that cooperation between Israelis and Palestinians on the COVID-19 pandemic is breaking down, "putting human lives at risk".
- 22 July: Independent United Nations human rights experts call for Iran to urgently release human rights activist Narges Mohammadi, reportedly ill with COVID-19 symptoms, together with other arbitrarily detained individuals, "before it is too late".
- 23 July: The United Nations High-level Advisory Board on Economic and Social Affairs releases the report Recover Better: Economic and Social Challenges and Opportunities, calling for "an adjusted approach" to economic development and global solidarity in response to the worst recession in decades and first rise in global poverty since 1998.
- 25 July: Tapan Mishra, the United Nations Resident Coordinator in Mongolia, warned of a major economic impact from the pandemic and development setback, despite its very few cases of COVID-19.
- 31 July: Alicia Bárcena, head of the UN regional body for Latin America and the Caribbean (ECLAC), while noting that the economic crisis caused by the COVID-19 pandemic was "pushing millions more into poverty", affirms that the public health crisis had to be addressed to address the economic crisis. Recognising that it is the new hotspot of the pandemic, the Secretary General issues a new policy brief on the impact of COVID-19 on Latin America and the Caribbean.
- 4 August: The UN launches a COVID-19 Response Plan for the Philippines, with financial requirements of $122 million, to provide "critical health interventions and multi-sectoral humanitarian assistance" to those in epidemic hotspots in its largest country response since 2013, the UN response to Typhoon Haiyan.
- 6 Aug: UN ECLAC presented a document studying the possible co-relation on the anecdotal evidence that air quality has improved because of the measures adopted by the region's national or local governments to limit the spread of the COVID-19.
- 4 September: The UN Relief and Works Agency for Palestine Refugees announced that it needs approximately $95 million to cover the emergency needs of 5.6 million registered Palestinian refugees until the end of the year. during a COVID-19 lock-down.
- 8 September: The UN Deputy Secretary-General urged Finance Ministers globally to solidify a menu of options to help recovery in the face of 70–100 million people potentially experiencing extreme poverty, an extra 265 million people potentially encountering acute food shortages, and approximately 400 million lost jobs, together with 1.6 billion educations affected.
- 7 October: The World Trade Organization announced that global trade was showing signs of bouncing back from the COVID-19-induced depression, while warning that recovery could be severely disrupted by how the pandemic develops and how societies react.
- 20 October: The Department of Economic and Social Affairs, launching the 2020 The World's Women: Trends and Statistics report, noted that the pandemic is stalling and/or reversing effort to achieve gender equality.

== Funding ==
The United Nations is seeking to fund its response through three main plans, comprising $1.74 billion for the 'Strategic Preparedness and Response Plan', which is to address immediate health needs; $7.32 billion for the 'Global Humanitarian Response Plan', which is to lessen the impacts in the world's 50 most vulnerable countries, and $1 billion for the 'UN framework for the immediate socio-economic response', which is to effect rapid recovery. On 1 March 2020, the UN released US$15 million from the Central Emergency Response Fund (CERF) to help vulnerable countries battle the spread of the COVID-19. A further call for funding came from the Secretary-General at a high-level event on coronavirus on 30 September 2020, where he urged more countries to step up and fund global COVID-19 vaccine efforts to the tune of US$35 billion, the same amount spent on cigarettes every two weeks.

== Criticism ==
The United Nations Security Council has been criticized over the lack of a coordinated response to the COVID-19 pandemic, especially regarding the time it took to agree on a resolution demanding a global ceasefire.

== See also ==
- Global ceasefire
- List of United Nations resolutions in response to the COVID-19 pandemic
- Timeline of the COVID-19 pandemic
