= Justice Call =

US-based non-governmental organization

- Formation: 2018
- Founder: Khaled Emam
- Type: Nonprofit
- Tax ID no.: 882715801
- Legal status: Charity
- Purpose: Peacebuilding
- Headquarters: New York, US
- Website: justicecall.org

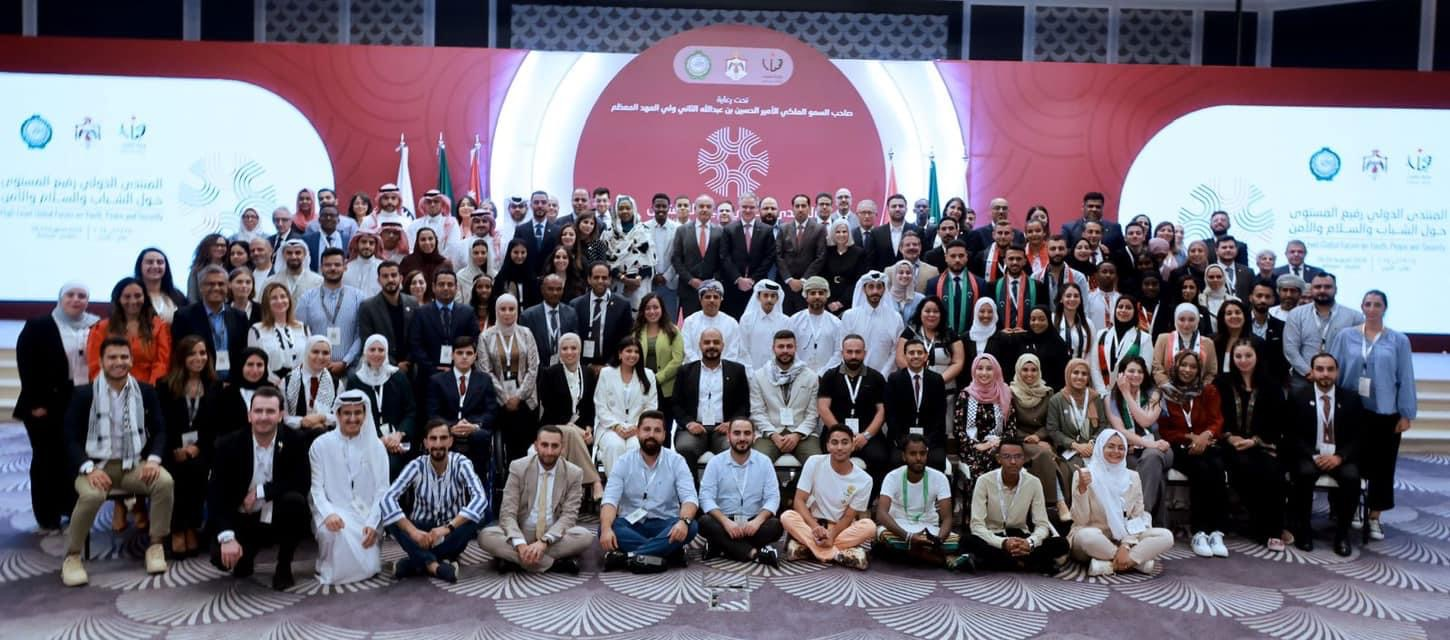
Members from Justice Call at the High-Level Global Forum on Youth, Peace, and Security hosted by Jordan with the League of Arab States

Justice Call is an international non-governmental organization based in New York, US, focused on promoting peace, justice, and youth empowerment globally. The organization focuses on creating inclusive spaces for dialogue and collaboration, particularly in conflict-affected regions, with a mission to build just, equitable, and sustainable societies. Justice Call operates through partnerships with over 200 youth-led organizations across 17 countries in the MENA region and collaborates with global institutions such as the United Nations, Peace Boat and the International Criminal Court (ICC).

The organization has co-created several regional platforms like the TECH4YPS initiative, leveraging technology to promote youth-led peacebuilding in the Middle East, and has facilitated a high-level dialogue on inclusive peacebuilding in Sudan in partnership with the Global Partnership for the Prevention of Armed Conflict (GPPAC). Justice Call is also involved in influencing global policy on youth, peace, and security by engaging with multilateral organizations and intergovernmental organizations, including the United Nations, the League of Arab States, and the Union for the Mediterranean on issues related to Youth, Peace, and Security in the Middle East. Additionally, Justice Call hosts regional peacebuilding platforms, such as the MENA Coalition on Youth, Peace, and Security (MCYPS) and the Women’s Network on Prevention (WRNP), which aims to amplify voices and foster collaboration in the region.

== History ==
Justice Call was founded by a group of activists from the Middle East and North Africa (MENA) region with the support of the Global Partnership for the Prevention of Armed Conflict (GPPAC) to address the growing need for inclusive and youth-led approaches to peacebuilding. The organization’s establishment was inspired by the adoption of the United Nations Security Council Resolution 2250 (UNSCR 2250) on Youth, Peace, and Security, which underscores the critical role of young people in conflict prevention, peacebuilding, and decision-making processes.

Since its inception, Justice Call has become a player in advocating for justice and sustainable peace in the MENA region. It has played an active role in facilitating youth participation in global peace and security forums, including briefings to the United Nations Security Council and the United Nations Peacebuilding Commission. Through its efforts, Justice Call continues to advance the inclusion of young people as essential stakeholders in building equitable and peaceful societies.

== Approach ==
The Justice Call Approach is a core methodology that underpins the organization’s work, developed through years of engagement with grassroots organizations and communities in conflict-affected regions This approach focuses on empowering local actors by providing direct resources to grassroots organizations, allowing them to address challenges with greater autonomy and responsiveness. Justice Call prioritizes the creation of regional platforms that foster collaboration and amplify local voices, ensuring solutions are both context-specific and community-driven.

The methodology is founded on the principle that sustainable change requires the active participation of those most affected by conflict and injustice. Through initiatives such as the MENA Coalition on Youth, Peace, and Security (MCYPS) and the Women’s Network on Prevention (WRNP), Justice Call facilitates resource-sharing, knowledge exchange, and the co-creation of innovative solutions. Over time, this approach builds trust, enhances regional capacity, and integrates enduring change within local institutions and societal norms.

== Structure ==
Justice Call is headquartered in New York, USA and its regional hub is in Amman, Jordan, with a significant presence across most countries across the Middle East and North Africa (MENA) region. The organization operates through partnerships with over 200 youth-led organizations in 17 countries and focuses on grassroots empowerment. Justice Call ensures that its teams and collaborators represent the diverse communities it serves, with staff and partners drawn from a variety of ethnic, cultural, and political backgrounds.

=== Key projects and initiatives ===
Justice Call focuses on building and sustaining regional platforms for collaboration, which serve as hubs for grassroots organizations, youth leaders, and peacebuilding practitioners particularly in conflict-affected regions. Here are some of its most prominent program.

==== MENA Coalition on Youth, Peace, and Security (MCYPS) ====
The MCYPS is a regional platform that brings together over 200 youth-led organizations from 17 countries. It focuses on fostering meaningful youth participation in peacebuilding processes, providing capacity-building opportunities, and advocating for the Youth, Peace, and Security (YPS) agenda at local, regional, and international levels.

==== Women’s Network on Prevention (WRNP) ====
The Women’s Network on Prevention (WRNP) is a regional initiative established in 2021 through a joint effort by Justice Call and the United Nations Office of the Special Adviser on the Prevention of Genocide (UNOSAPG). The WRNP aims to integrate gender perspectives into peacebuilding narratives and strategies, addressing the unique challenges faced by women in conflict-affected regions.

==== The MENA Coalition for International Justice (MCIJ) ====
The MENA Coalition for International Justice (MCIJ) was founded by Justice Call to empower youth-led groups and young legal professionals across the Middle East and North Africa in their efforts to promote justice and accountability. The coalition aims to address justice gaps through strategic partnerships and youth-led initiatives, focusing on the unique challenges of the region.

==== Our Peace (Sudan) ====
Our Peace (سلامنا) is a project funded by UN Women that aims to create realistic and effective solutions to peacebuilding through dialogue and collaboration. The project brings together young women and men from creative studios, women-focused civil society organizations (CSOs), youth-focused CSOs, and research institutes to form resilient advocacy groups and engage in joint campaigns for collective action.

==== Agents and Drivers of Peace (Libya) ====
The Agents and Drivers of Peace project focused on strengthening the meaningful engagement of young men and women in building sustainable peace in Libya. The initiative aimed to bridge gaps between local peacebuilders and national, regional, and international stakeholders to ensure that young peacebuilders are fully and effectively included in peace processes.

== See also ==
- List of peace activists
- United Nations Security Council Resolution 2250
- Genocide education
- GPPAC
- UNOY
- Peacebuilding
- Peacebuilding Commission
