= Khaled Emam =

Egyptian human rights lawyer and peace activist born in 1994

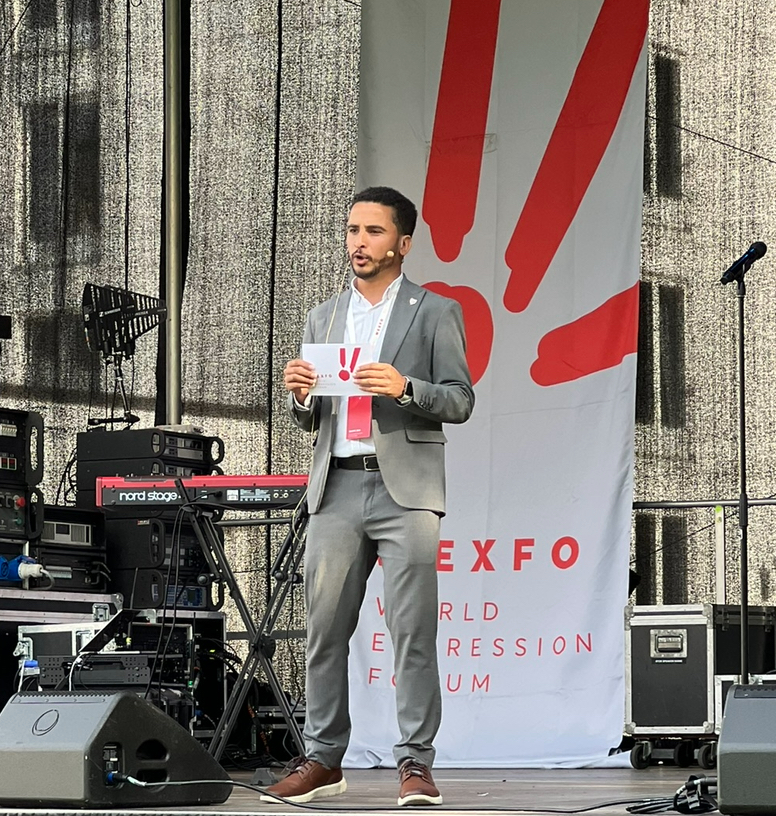
- Born: January 17, 1994 (age 32)
- Citizenship: Egypt
- Education: Harvard University
- Occupations: Lawyer, writer, human rights activist
- Website: khaledemam.org

Khaled Emam is an Egyptian human rights lawyer and peacebuilder who founded Justice Call, a youth-led regional organization established in 2018 that works on human rights, the rule of law, and peacebuilding in the Middle East and North Africa (MENA). He is the executive director of Justice Call and, as of 2026, a former visiting fellow at the Harvard Kennedy School.

== Early life and education ==
Emam grew up in Upper Egypt and was the first person from his village to go on to higher education. He later earned a master's degree in international law from Cairo University and a master's in public administration from Harvard Kennedy School. In 2024, Emam received the Eric Yankah Award, which is given to Mason Fellows for distinguished contributions to the Edward S. Mason Program and Harvard Kennedy School.

== Career ==
In 2018, Emam founded Justice Call, a youth-led regional organization that works on human rights, the rule of law, and peacebuilding in the Middle East and North Africa (MENA).

Emam later became the first Arab to serve as co-chair of the United Nations Inter-Agency Network on Youth Development, where he led youth engagement in international policymaking platforms. At Harvard, he also served as a teaching fellow for courses related to the Middle East, leadership and democracy.

Emam has represented Justice Call in international justice and peacebuilding forums. In 2019, he attended the High-level Political Forum on Sustainable Development, where he described his work which supports civil society organizations facing legal and administrative restrictions in the Middle East and North Africa Region and raises awareness among young people about Sustainable Development Goal 16. In 2021, he spoke on behalf of the organization at the twentieth session of the Assembly of States Parties to the Rome Statute of the International Criminal Court, where he called for stronger support for accountability, civil society, and human rights defenders in the MENA region. In 2022, he was among the civil society speakers at a joint meeting of the United Nations Economic and Social Council and the United Nations Peacebuilding Commission on financing for peacebuilding. He was also a speaker at the 2025 World Justice Forum.

Emam is also the founder and executive director of the Arab Leadership Institute and a former visiting fellow at the Carr Center for Human Rights Policy.
