= United Nations Security Council Resolution 2419 =

UN Security Council Resolution 2419
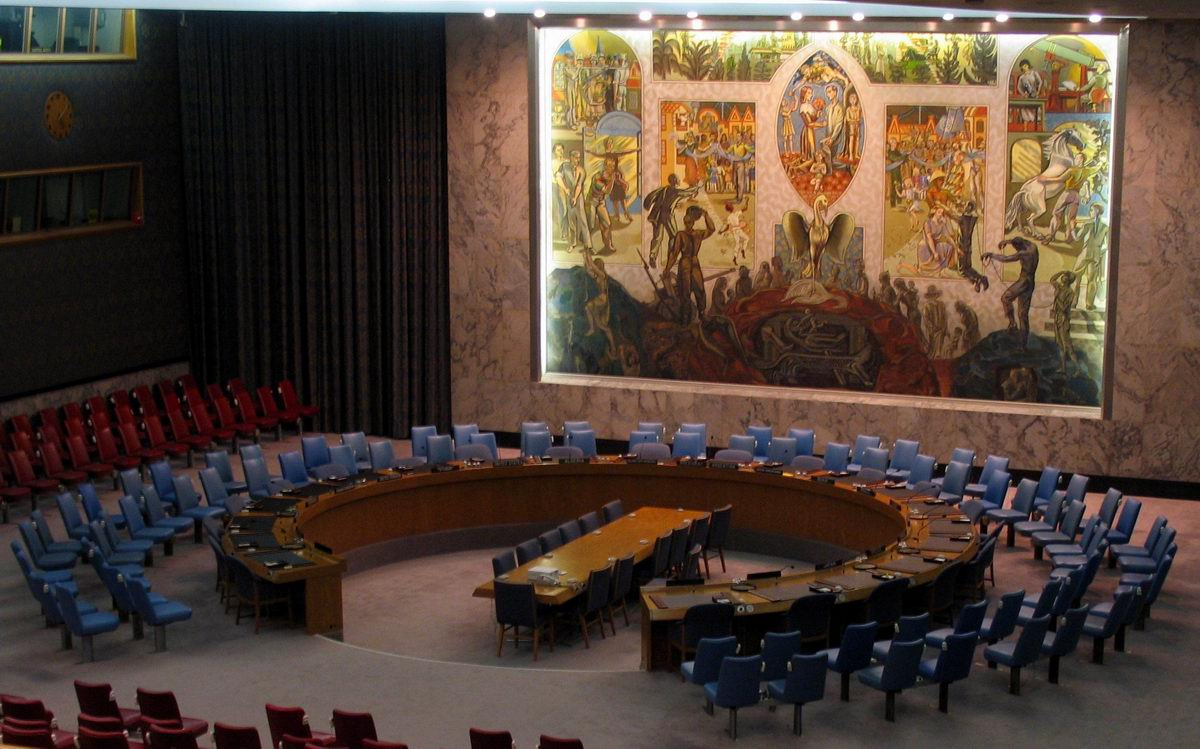
- Date: 2018-06-06 2018
- Meeting no.: 8277
- Code: S/RES/2419 (2018)
- Voting summary: 15 voted for; None voted against; None abstained
- Result: Adopted

Security Council composition
- Permanent members: China; France; Russia; United Kingdom; United States
- Non-permanent members: Bolivia; Côte d'Ivoire; Equatorial Guinea; Ethiopia; Kazakhstan; Kuwait; Netherlands; Peru; Poland; Sweden

United Nations Security Council Resolution 2419 emphasizes the importance of engaging young people in peace processes, decision-making, and efforts to counter violent extremism.

It was unanimously adopted on 6 June 2018. It underscores the critical role of youth in conflict prevention, resolution, and peacebuilding. The resolution builds on the foundational framework of Resolution 2250 (2015) and advances the Youth, Peace, and Security (YPS) agenda.

== Key Provisions ==
1. Youth Participation in Peacebuilding: calls on the Secretary‑General and his Special Envoys to incorporate youth perspectives into security-related discussions and facilitate their full and equal participation at decision-making levels. It urges Member States to enhance youth representation in the negotiation and implementation of peace agreements, recognizing their exclusion as a barrier to sustainable peace.
2. Education and Protection: The resolution advocates for the protection of educational institutions as safe spaces, free from violence, and accessible to all youth. It highlights the need to ensure young women's equal access to education as a fundamental right and a cornerstone for empowerment.
3. Role of Regional and National Bodies: Member States and regional bodies are encouraged to engage youth in national peacebuilding efforts. The resolution specifically recommends that the Peacebuilding Commission include youth engagement strategies in its advisories.
4. United Nations Reporting and Mechanisms: The Secretary‑General is requested to include report progress on youth participation in disarmament, demobilization, reintegration, and community violence reduction programs. Additionally, the Secretary is asked to broaden internal UN mechanisms to increase youth participation and submit a progress report by May 2020.
5. Alignment with Global Agendas: The resolution connects the YPS agenda with the 2030 Agenda for Sustainable Development, emphasizing that youth inclusion is essential to achieving global peace and security.

== See also ==
- United Nations Security Council Resolution 2250
- United Nations Security Council Resolution 2535
