= United Nations Security Council Resolution 2535 =

UN Security Council Resolution 2535
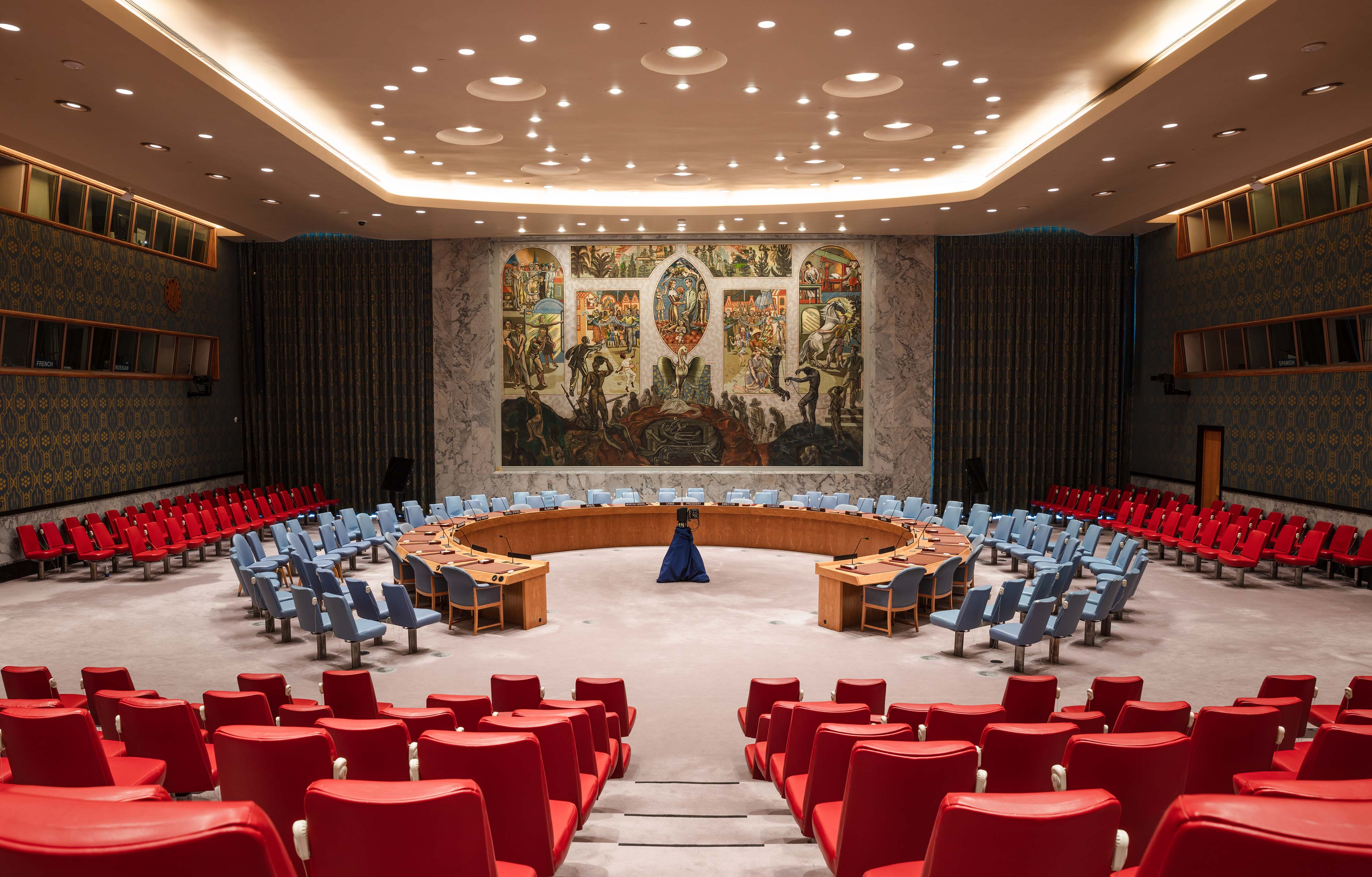
- Security Council Chamber 16 November 2023
- Date: 14 July 2020
- Meeting no.: 8748
- Code: S/RES/2535 (2020)
- Voting summary: 15 voted for; None voted against; None abstained
- Result: Adopted

Security Council composition
- Permanent members: China; France; Russia; United Kingdom; United States
- Non-permanent members: Belgium; Dominican Republic; Estonia; Germany; Indonesia; Niger; St.Vincent–Grenadines; South Africa; Tunisia; Vietnam

United Nations Security Council Resolution 2535 is a resolution that attempts to further support the concept of including youths in peace processes.

On 14 July 2020, the United Nations Security Council adopted Resolution 2535, its third resolution on Youth, Peace, and Security (YPS). This resolution was co-sponsored by France and the Dominican Republic, marking the first collaboration between a permanent and a non-permanent member of the Security Council to co-sponsor a YPS resolution.

A key feature of Resolution 2535 is its formal integration of the YPS agenda into Security Council priorities. The resolution requires the UN Secretary-General to submit a biennial report on the implementation of the YPS agenda and related resolutions, thereby solidifying its place on the UNSC agenda.

UNSCR 2535 builds upon previous commitments established in UNSCR 2250 (2015), UNSCR 2419 (2018), and the Presidential Statement on YPS (S/PRST/2019) adopted in December 2019. It introduces new language to strengthen political commitment to the YPS agenda, emphasizing the meaningful inclusion of youth in peace processes and humanitarian action. Additionally, the resolution aims to protect ‘civic and political spaces,’ which are areas in which young peacebuilders may operate.

== See also ==
United Nations Security Council Resolution 2250

United Nations Security Council Resolution 2419
