= United Nations Security Council Resolution 2532 =

UN Security Council Resolution 2532
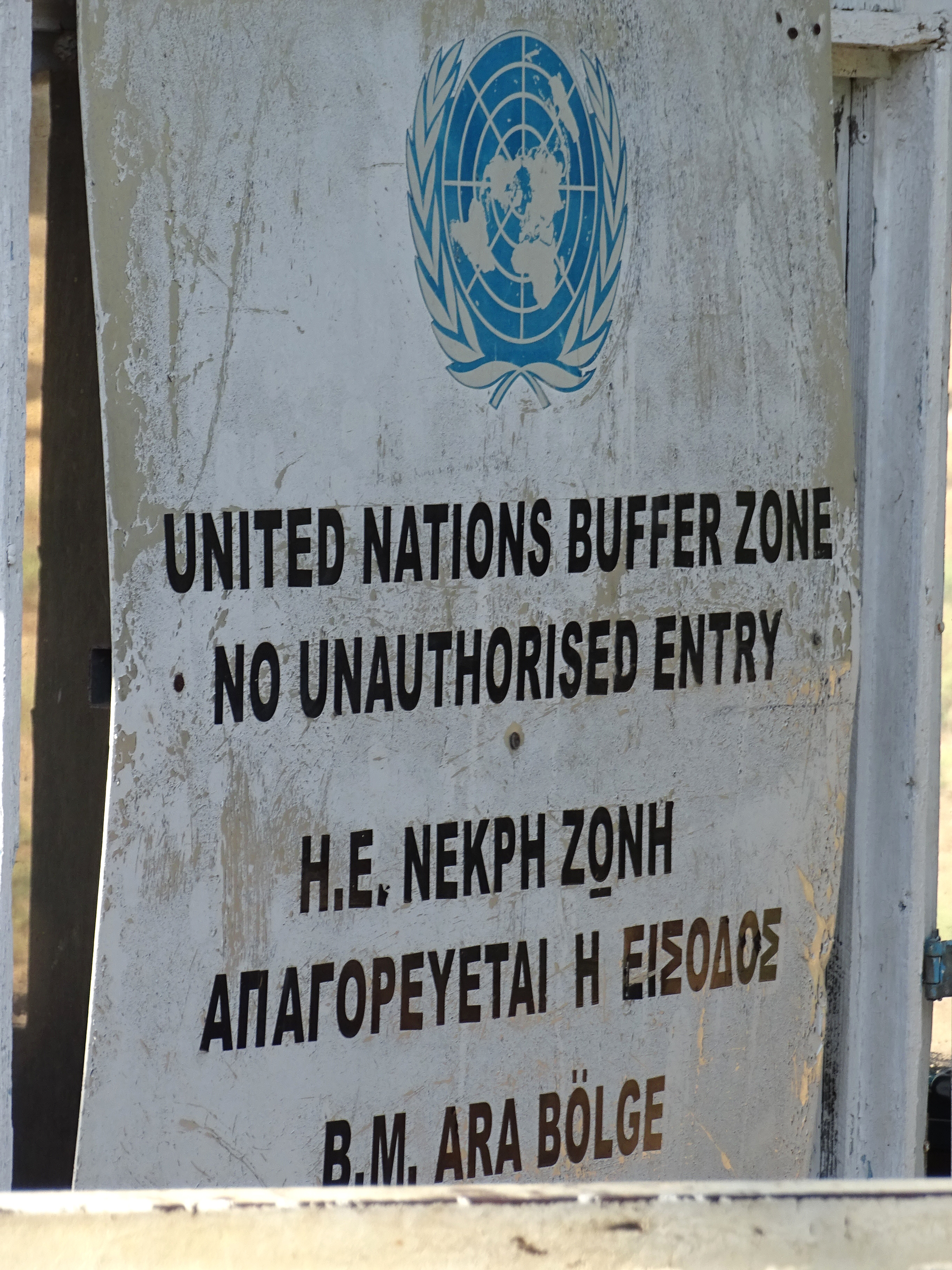
- UN buffer zone in Nicosia
- Date: 1 July 2020
- Code: S/RES/2532 (Document)
- Subject: Maintenance of international peace and security
- Voting summary: 15 voted for; None voted against; None abstained
- Result: Adopted

Security Council composition
- Permanent members: China; France; Russia; United Kingdom; United States
- Non-permanent members: Belgium; Dominican Republic; Estonia; Germany; Indonesia; Niger; St.Vincent–Grenadines; South Africa; Tunisia; Vietnam

United Nations Security Council Resolution 2532 was adopted on 1 July 2020. The resolution is a response to United Nations Secretary-General António Manuel de Oliveira Guterres' 'Appeal for Global Ceasefire' of Monday, 23 March 2020, and, as the first global ceasefire, is part of the United Nations' response to the COVID-19 pandemic.

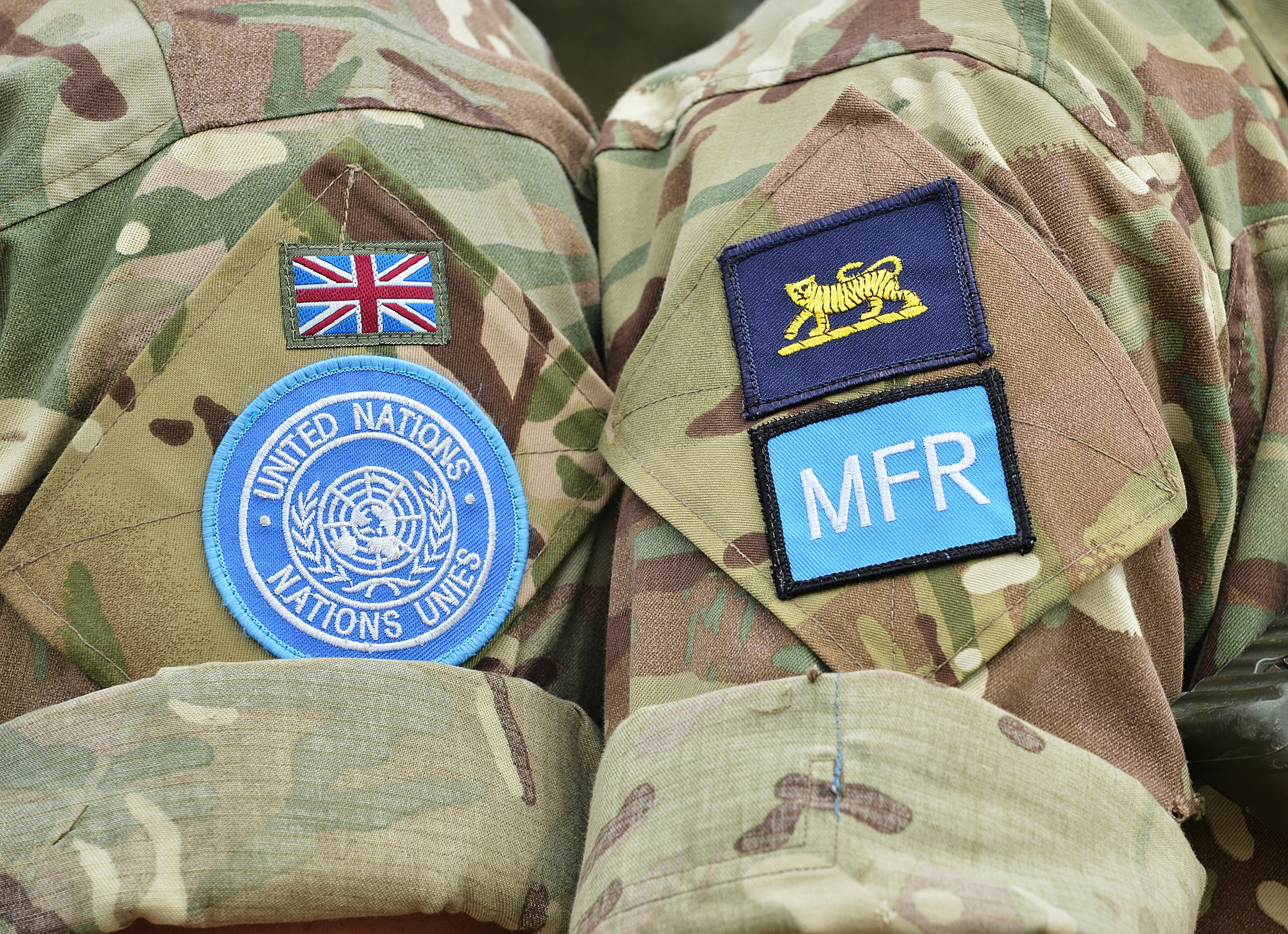
UN soldiers

The resolution demands "a general and immediate cessation of hostilities in all situations on its agenda" (i.e., those already identified by the United Nations Security Council (UNSC)); calls for all parties engaged in armed conflicts (i.e., including those not specifically on the UNSC agenda) to "engage immediately in a durable humanitarian pause for at least 90 consecutive days"; specifically excludes UNSC designated terrorist groups, e.g., the Islamic State in Iraq and the Levant; requests that the UN Secretary-General accelerates the international response to the coronavirus pandemic, requests that the Secretary-General regularly updates the UNSC, requests that the Secretary-General instructs peace-keeping operations to provide support and maintain continuity of operations, acknowledges the critical role of women in COVID-19 response efforts and the severe effect on the vulnerable, and decides to maintain oversight.

== See also ==
- Global ceasefire
- List of United Nations Security Council Resolutions 2501 to 2600 (2019–2021)
- United Nations response to the COVID-19 pandemic
