= Global ceasefire =

Temporary stoppage of war on a planetary scale

A global ceasefire is a temporary stoppage of war on a planetary scale, i.e., by every country. A global ceasefire was first proposed by United Nations Secretary-General António Guterres on Monday, 23 March 2020, as part of the United Nations' response to the COVID-19 pandemic. On 24 June 2020, 170 UN Member States and Observers signed a non-binding statement in support of the Appeal, and on 1 July 2020, the UN Security Council passed a resolution demanding a general and immediate cessation of hostilities for at least 90 days and requesting that the UN Secretary-General accelerate the international response to the coronavirus pandemic.

== 2020-2021 global ceasefire ==
=== Appeal ===
United Nations Secretary-General António Manuel de Oliveira Guterres issued the 'Appeal for Global Ceasefire' in a verbal statement delivered on March 23, 2020. The statement declared COVID-19 to be a common enemy, highlighted that the world's most vulnerable, such as women and children in conflict zones, were at most risk, noted that health systems had collapsed in conflict areas, emphasized the folly of war, appealed directly to warring parties, and called for an immediate global ceasefire.

To warring parties, I say: Pull back from hostilities. Put aside mistrust and animosity. Silence the guns; stop the artillery; end the airstrikes. This is crucial…

— António Manuel de Oliveira Guterres, Appeal for Global Ceasefire, United Nations Office of the Secretary-General

The Appeal quickly accumulated support in the General Assembly, resulting in 172 UN Member States and Observers signing a non-binding statement in support. UN Security Council (UNSC) support was complicated by the issue of non-state actors and great power conflicts but after just over three months resulted in a UNSC resolution (S/RES/2532 (2020)) in support of the Appeal.

=== Timeline ===
- 23 March 2020: UN Secretary-General Guterres issues the 'Appeal for Global Ceasefire', also stating that he communicated with the leaders of the G20 on the same day.
- 29 March 2020: Pope Francis issues statement in support of UN Secretary-General Guterres' call for a global ceasefire.
- 2 April 2020: A Russian resolution to back a global ceasefire and end trade wars and sanctions is rejected by a western alliance in favour of a more general commitment, General Assembly resolution A/RES/74/270, calling for international cooperation, global solidarity, and multilateralism in the face of the COVID-19 pandemic.
- 3 April 2020: UN Secretary-General Guterres reports approximately 70 UN Member States were supporting the Appeal, of which 11 were locked in long-term conflicts, with the appeal also being supported by civil society networks, non-state actors, and regional partners.
- 8 April 2020: The Saudi-led coalition fighting Yemen's Iran-aligned Houthis in the Yemeni conflict states that it is halting military operations.
- 14 April 2020: French President Emmanuel Macron declares support for the ceasefire appeal and states that he has also secured support from three of the five permanent members of the UN Security Council (China, Great Britain, and the United States) and appears optimistic of securing the support of Russian President Vladimir Putin.
- 24 June 2020: Led by Malaysia, 170 UN Member States and Observers sign a non-binding statement calling on all actors to support the ceasefire appeal, rising to 172 on 25 June 2020.
- 1 July 2020: The UN Security Council passes resolution S/RES/2532 (2020), demanding a "a general and immediate cessation of hostilities in all situations on its agenda" and expressing support for "the efforts undertaken by the Secretary-General and his Special Representatives and Special Envoys in that respect." The resolution also calls for "all parties to armed conflicts to engage immediately in a durable humanitarian pause" of at least 90 consecutive days and requests that the Secretary-General enhances the United Nations' response to the pandemic, particularly in conflict zones."

The Security Council... Requests the Secretary-General to help ensure that all relevant parts of the United Nations system, including UN Country Teams, in accordance with their respective mandates, accelerate their response to the COVID-19 pandemic with a particular emphasis on countries in need, including those in situations of armed conflict or affected by humanitarian crises...

— United Nations Security Council, United Nations S/RES/2532 (2020), United Nations

=== Reaction ===
Following the March 23, 2020 issue of the Appeal, despite initial optimism and an increase in ceasefire announcements in nearly all regions globally, the UN Security Council (UNSC) was unable to come to a consensus in support of the concept, and wars continued. Reaction to the July 1, 2020 UNSC resolution has generally been positive. Nancy Lindborg, President and CEO of the United States Institute of Peace (USIP) has welcomed the statement. On July 1, 2020, Sherine Tadros, Head of Amnesty International’s UN Office in New York, noted that the global ceasefire demanded by the UN could allow states to focus on the vital work of defeating the coronavirus pandemic. On July 5, 2020, Pope Francis commended the resolution and expressed the hope that “this decision will be implemented effectively and promptly for the sake of the many people who are suffering” globally.

A July 8, 2020 USIP analysis sees the potential for the UNSC resolution to encourage ceasefires at three levels: providing mediators with an urgent, yet realistic, impetus for conflict parties to temporarily cease offensive operations; creating a monitoring framework for recording the "worst abusers" of the resolution; and providing opportunities for urgently required humanitarian aid in worsening conflict zones.

A subsequent UNSC resolution of 14 July 2020 (S/RES/2535 (2020)) emphasizes the importance of youth to peace-building and the cessation of conflicts and urges UN member states to incorporate youth in peace-building processes in conflict zones. Subsequent UNSC briefings by the Secretary-General have included discussions on how to operationalize the ceasefire amid the pandemic.

As of 24 September, 2020, over 21,000 people had been killed in conflict zones since UNSC Resolution 2532, and in the face of famine and other humanitarian issues in conflict zones worsened by COVID-19, aid organizations called for an extension of the ceasefire by at least another 90 days.

Nonetheless, the global ceasefire, or at least the pandemic, is seen as having had a major impact on fighting. In 2020, an average of 10 civilians a day were reported killed by explosive weapons, compared with 18 in 2019. According to an analysis by the London-based Action on Armed Violence (AOAV), 8,165 people were reported killed by explosive weapons in 48 countries and territories, of whom 3,668 were civilians, with over 10,500 reported injured, the highest percentage fall in civilian casualties (a 43% drop) from conflict in 10 years.

In 2021, UN Security Council permanent members like the United Kingdom have continued to support the Global Ceasefire, which is considered to still be active, but serious conflict has continued.

=== Main issues ===
Given the early support by many members of the United Nations General Assembly for UN Secretary-General Guterres' appeal, the wait of over three months for a resolution from the UN Security Council (UNSC) has been cast as a failing on the part of the UNSC to lead in terms of a response to a global emergency (the coronavirus pandemic) and even to support the UN Charter, which is founded on peace.

Coordinating a global ceasefire is complicated by the fact that the coronavirus pandemic appears to have actually worsened conflict dynamics, by different UNSC perspectives on the issue of non-state actors, including those deemed terrorist organizations, and by the permanent members of the UNSC also being involved in long-lasting conflicts in regions such as the Middle East. The United States also reportedly objected to a draft of the resolution which mentioned the World Health Organization, and the difficulty in the UNSC achieving meaningful consensus on the global ceasefire can also be seen as part of the UN's wider lack of a unitary response to the coronavirus pandemic.

More generally, the difficulty in agreeing on the terms of the UNSC resolution highlights the problem of establishing meaningful ceasefires in the case of long-lasting conflicts, i.e., converting preliminary ceasefires into definitive ceasefires that could lead to peace, on a global scale. For instance, there has been a flare-up in the Caucasus, specifically Nagorno-Karabakh, and in the Middle East and North Africa, ceasefires have been fleeting, leading to a call for better enforcement. However, there is a precedent for a major international disaster leading to a lasting peace, i.e., the 2004 tsunami, when rescue efforts in the Indonesian province of Aceh contributed towards starting a peace process that ended the insurgency in Aceh.

== See also ==
- Ceasefire
- International Day of Peace
- Perpetual peace
- United Nations Charter
- United Nations Security Council Resolution 2532
- World peace
