= United States and the Russo-Ukrainian war =

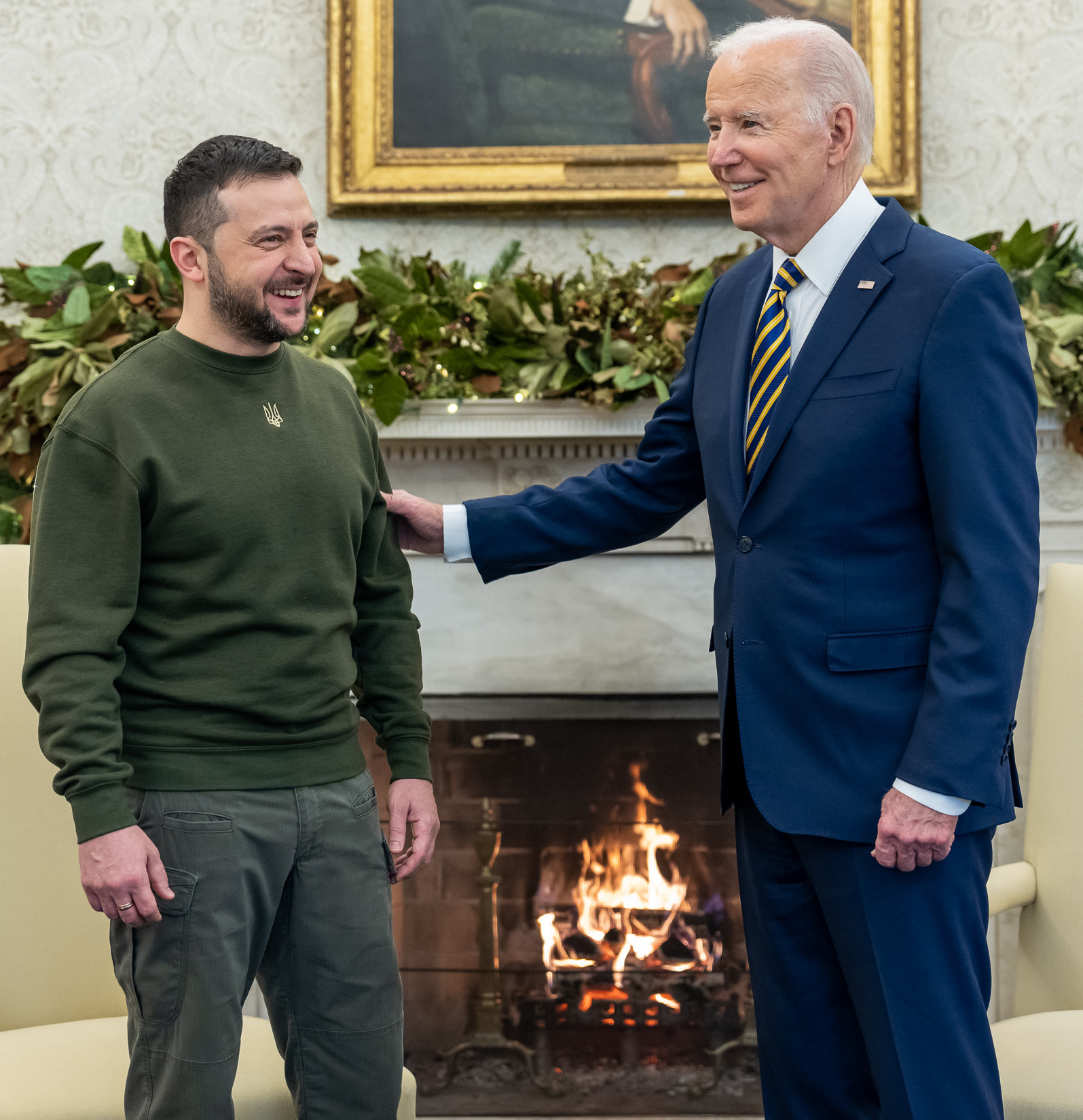
Joe Biden and Volodymyr Zelensky in the White House

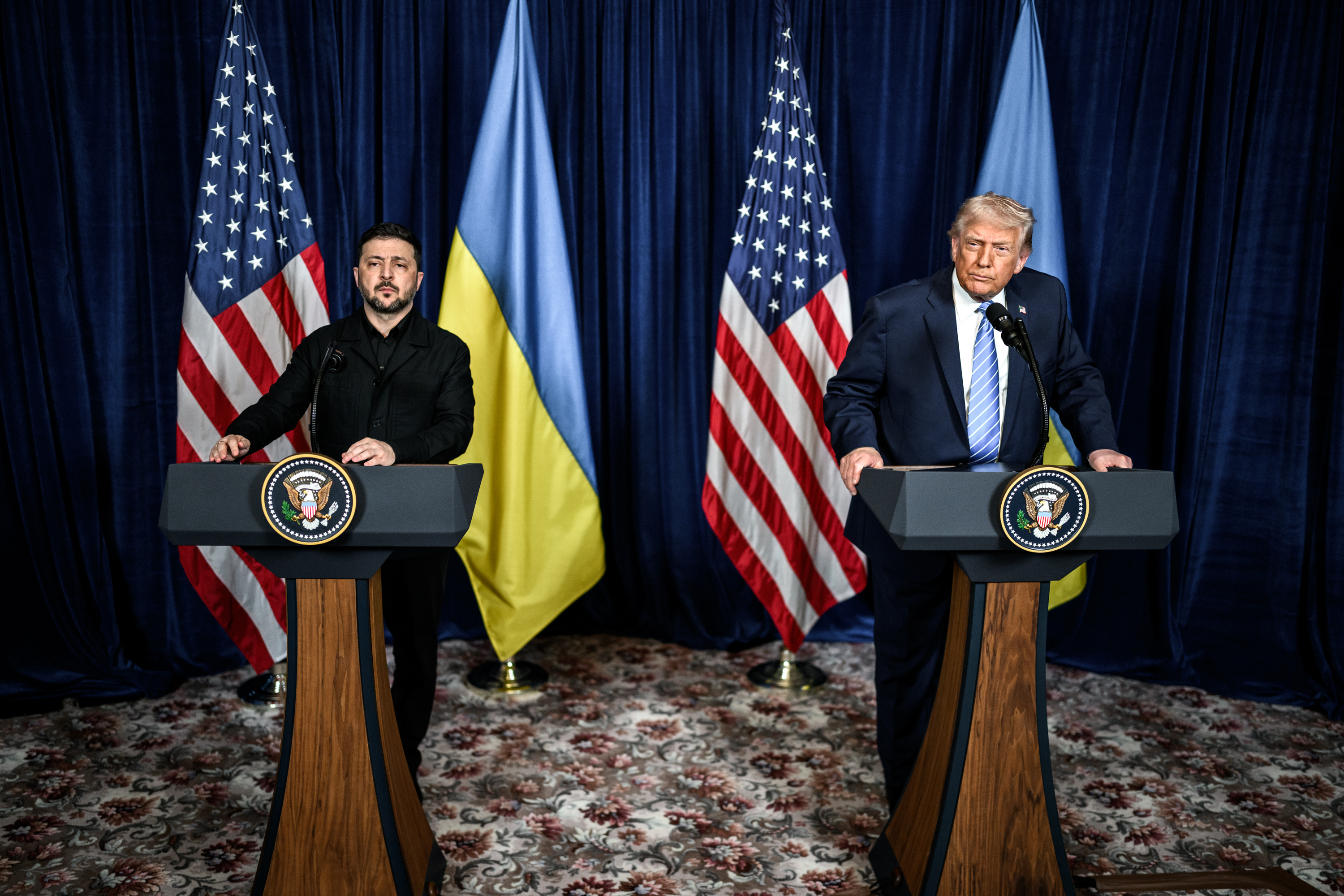
Donald Trump and Volodymyr Zelensky at Mar-a-Lago during a bilateral meeting

The United States has supported Ukraine during the ongoing Russo-Ukrainian war. The Russian invasion of Ukraine, which began in February 2022, was condemned by the Biden administration, which provided military, financial, and humanitarian aid to Ukraine, and imposed sanctions against Russia and Belarus. However, the second Trump administration since 2025 has proposed a peace deal and increasingly sought to distance itself from financially supporting Ukrainian resistance.

From January 2022 to December 2024, according to the Kiel Institute, the United States has provided around half of all military aid to Ukraine and has spent $119.7 billion on activities related to the Russian invasion, and on other activities including supporting increased US–European presence, Ukrainian refugees in the US, and global food insecurity. According to the Council on Foreign Relations, by the end of September 2024 the United States had allocated $175 billion, related to the invasion of Russia, $106 billion of which went into direct aid to Ukraine, whilst $69 billion remained in the US economy to support US industries.

There are several ways by which the US provides military and financial aid to Ukraine. Most of the military aid is old American weaponry and equipment from US reserve stockpiles; Presidential Drawdown Authority (PDA) allows the president to order the sending of this weaponry. American military contractors are then funded to make weapons to re-fill stockpiles. The Ukraine Security Assistance Initiative (USAI) funds the US Department of Defense to help train and advise the Ukrainian military, as well as to procure weaponry and equipment. The State Department's Foreign Military Financing (FMF) program helps allies like Ukraine buy weaponry and equipment from American manufacturers. Lastly, the US also sent some direct financial aid to the Ukrainian government through the United States Agency for International Development (USAID).

The Biden administration also imposed limits on the supply and use of some American weapons. For more than two years, it forbade Ukraine to fire American weapons, like the Army Tactical Missile System (ATACMS), at military targets inside Russia. From June 2024, it allowed Ukraine to strike inside Russia with US-supplied weapons, but only near the border in self-defense. On March 3, 2025, following disagreements during a meeting between Trump and Zelenskyy at the Oval Office, the second Trump administration paused all military aid to Ukraine. However, on March 11, 2025, U.S. military aid to Ukraine resumed after Ukraine agreed to a potential ceasefire.

== Biden administration (2022–2025) ==
US President Joe Biden gives his remarks on the Russian invasion of Ukraine.

The Biden administration got information on a potential Russian invasion as early as March 2021, at the time of large Russian military exercises. The US attempted to deter Russia from invading by proposing a US – Russia summit, and meeting with Russian officials in November 2021 and January 2022. The efforts failed.

=== Strategy ===
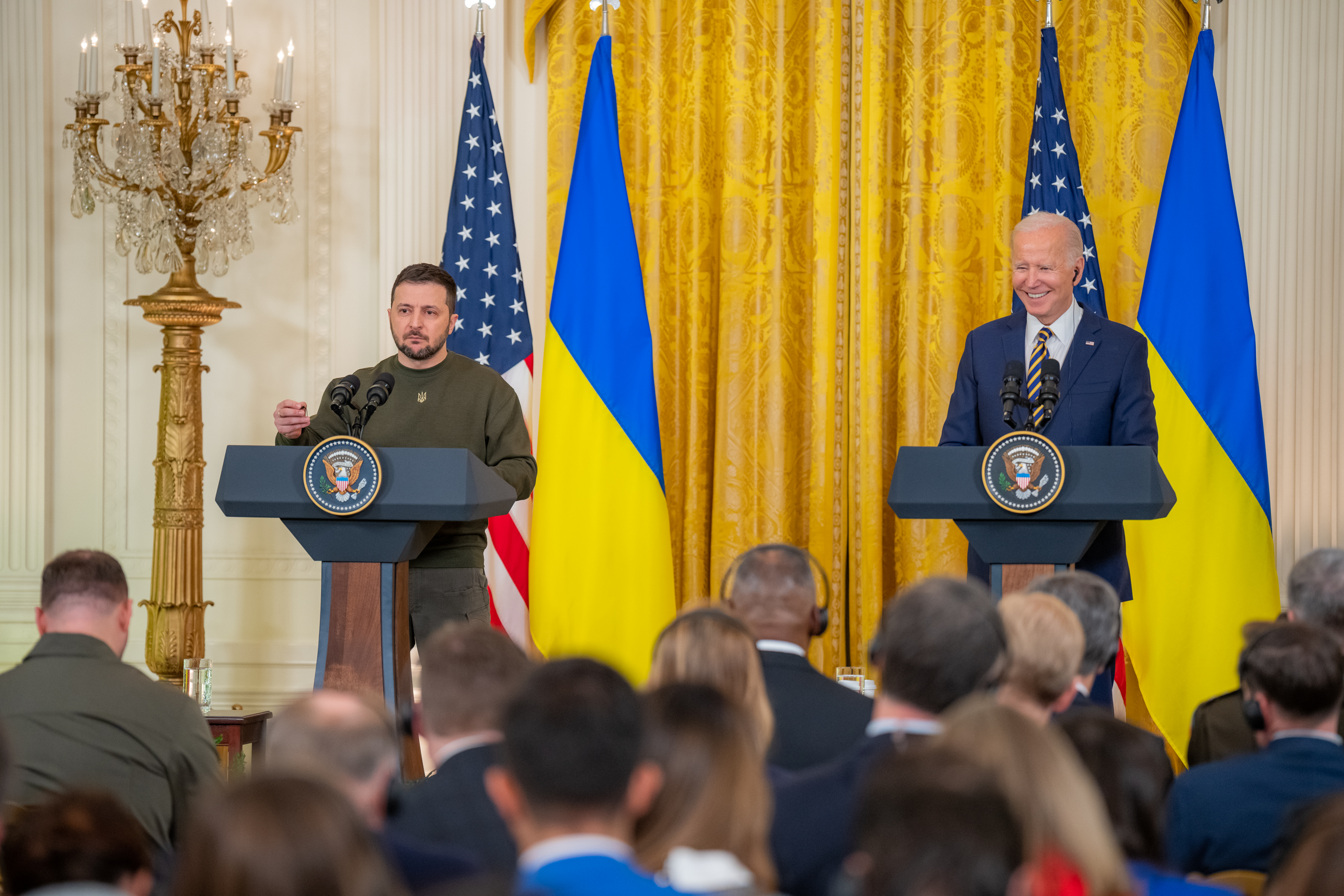
Biden and Zelenskyy hold a press conference in the East Room of the White House, December 21, 2022.

Since the start of the Russian invasion in 2022, US President Joe Biden had articulated a cautious US strategy towards the war. The goals were to mitigate the risk of escalation into a direct US-Russia confrontation while hindering Russia's military success. The Biden administration emphasized sustained support "for as long as it takes" to assist Ukraine's defense efforts. However, these are coupled with a focus on avoiding actions that could be construed as provocative by Russia and potentially leading to a wider war.

This cautious approach prioritizes limiting US risks of getting militarily involved while leaving the primary burden of repelling the invasion on Ukraine. Political scientist Kori Schake characterizes this strategy as exhibiting a "vulnerability of US support", arguing that the self-imposed limitations on US assistance, compared to Russia's aggression not limited by any boundaries, create a significant strategic advantage for Russia.

While this US strategy has been static for 2 years of war, the situation on the battlefield was changing with time. Eventually, static US strategy encountered its limitations. As the war enters its third year (as of April 2024), the battlefield situation evolved towards a stalemate and towards increased concerns that a persistent and determined Russian offensive could ultimately achieve its objectives.

In May 2023, Russia's Security Council Secretary Nikolai Patrushev accused the United States of involvement in Ukrainian attacks inside Russia.

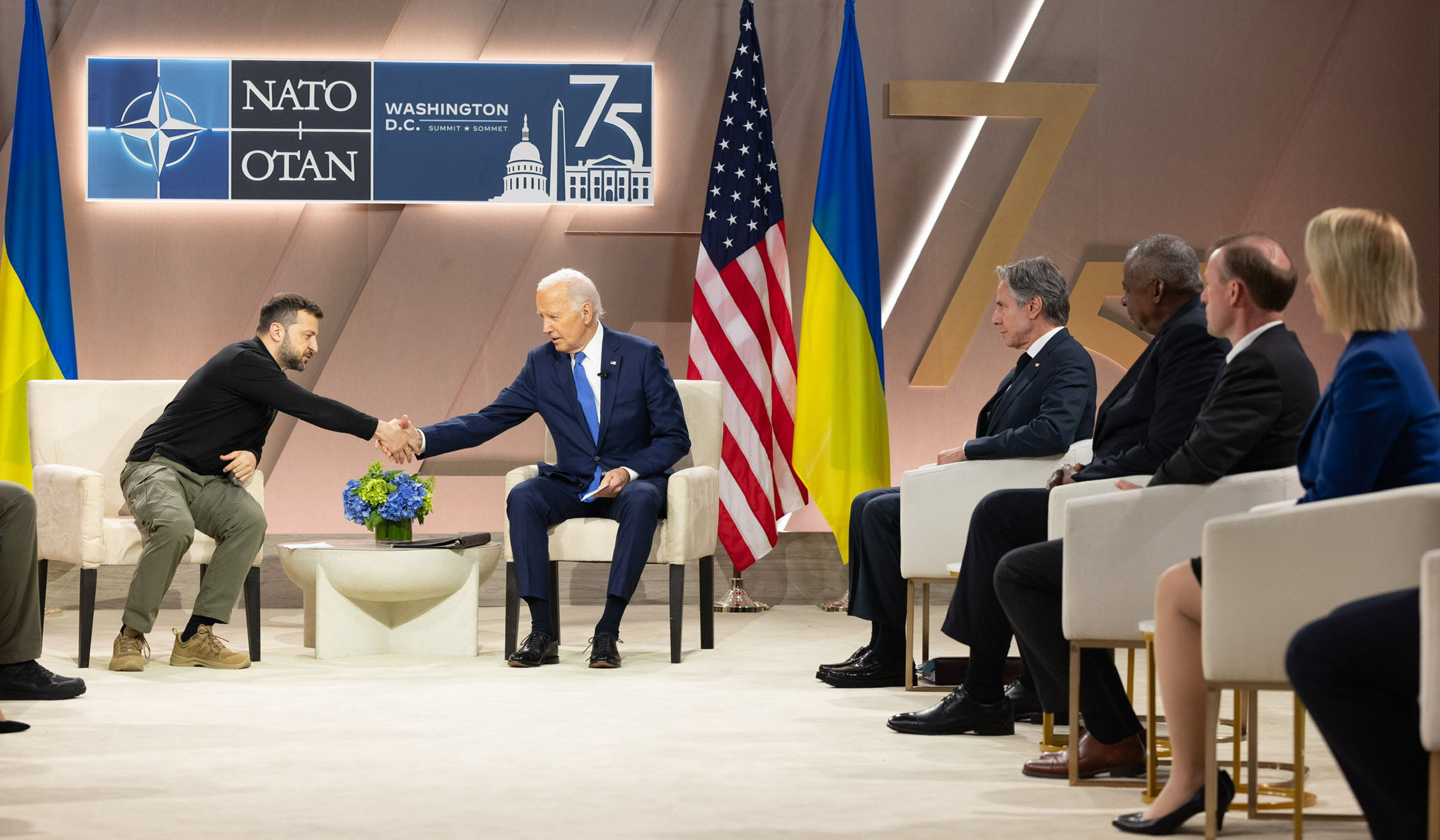
Biden and Zelenskyy at the 2024 NATO Summit in Washington, D.C., July 11, 2024

The Biden administration reportedly told Ukraine to stop attacking oil refineries in Russia, believing it would raise world energy prices and bring more aggressive Russian retaliation. The US also expressed concern at a Ukrainian drone strike against a Russian nuclear early-warning radar, believing that it could dangerously unsettle the Russian government.

In May 2024, Biden gave Ukraine permission to strike targets inside Russia adjacent to the Kharkiv region of Ukraine using American-supplied weapons. On August 9, 2024, U.S.-supplied HIMARS rocket system destroyed a convoy of Russian troops in the Kursk Oblast of Russia in what Russian milbloggers described as one of the bloodiest attacks of the entire war.

In September 2024, Russian president Vladimir Putin threatened retaliation for attacks on Russian territory with weapons supplied by the United States and its NATO allies. U.S. officials did not believe that Ukraine had enough ATACMS and British Storm Shadow missiles to alter the course of the war, according to The New York Times. On November 17, 2024, the Biden administration authorized the use of long-range ATACMS missiles for military targets inside mainland Russia.

=== Military assistance to Ukraine ===
After the start of Russian invasion, US president Joe Biden has committed to aid Ukraine for "as long as it takes". However US strategy's goals, aiding Ukraine and at the same time preventing Russian escalation, were contradicting each other. This contradiction "produced a repetitive cycle of Ukraine pleading for systems Washington denied, allies (particularly the United Kingdom) moving forward without the United States, the Biden administration bowing to public criticism and international pressure and slowly relenting, providing the systems months and even years later than when they would have been most effective". US military aid, per historian Phillips O'Brien, were "systems of limited range and defensive purpose". The delay in delivering weapons and ammunition resulted in Russian construction of defenses in late 2022 and early 2023.

In 2022, Congress approved more than $112 billion to help Ukraine defend itself from Russia. At the end of 2023, the Biden administration requested $61.4 billion more for Ukraine for the year ahead. On April 20, 2024, the U.S. House of Representatives approved a $95 billion aid package to Ukraine, Israel and Taiwan. President Biden said the U.S. military would not fight Russia in Ukraine, but would defend every inch of NATO territory. On March 16, President Biden announced an additional $800 million in security assistance to Ukraine, bringing the total U.S. security assistance committed to Ukraine to $2 billion since the start of his Administration.

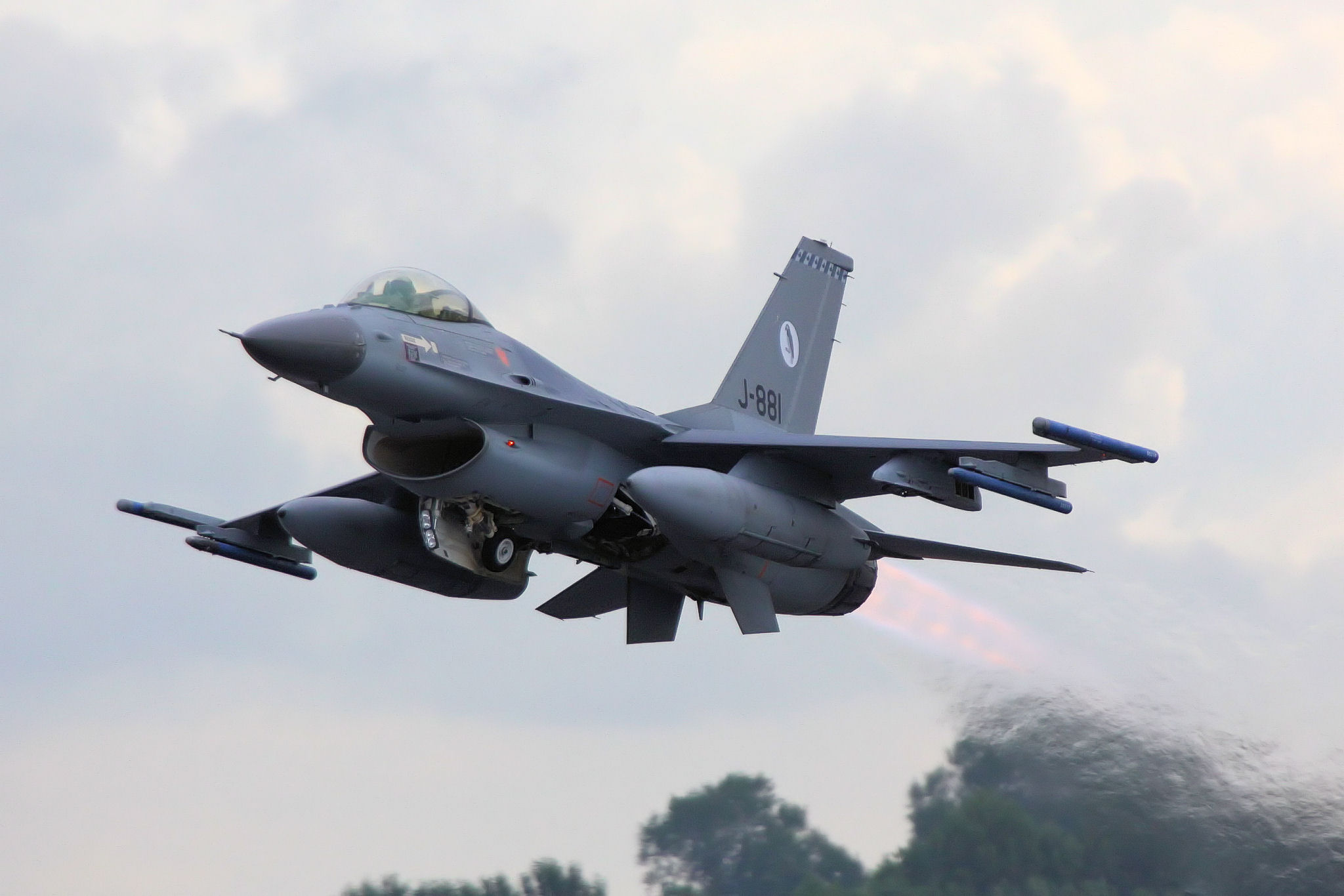
In August 2023, the Biden administration approved the transfer of F-16 fighter jets to Ukraine.

On February 26, US Secretary of State Antony Blinken stated that Ukraine would be provided with an additional $350 million in military aid to strengthen their defense capabilities. The United States Agency for International Development, along with United Nations agencies, provided relief supplies to the Ukrainian people, such as surgery and medical kits, emergency food, thermal blankets and sanitation supplies. The agency provided a total of $107 million in humanitarian aid.

On March 25, 2022, President Biden visited Poland near the border with Ukraine. Biden expressed his appreciation for the courage and tenacity of the Ukrainian people, and likened the Ukrainian people's resistance to Russia to the 1989 Tiananmen Square protests and massacre. On April 12, the United States sent $750M in additional military aid to Ukraine, including drones, howitzers and protective equipment to defend against chemical attacks. On April 24, an American delegation consisting of American Secretary of State Antony Blinken and Defense Secretary Lloyd Austin visited Ukrainian president Volodymyr Zelenskyy in Kyiv. After the visit US announced $713 million in military financing for Ukraine plus fifteen allied partner nations. In late April 2022, House Speaker Nancy Pelosi visited Zelenskyy in Kyiv together with other members of the House of Representatives including Adam Schiff. On August 1, the State Department announced $550 million in security aid to Ukraine focused on supplies for HIMARS systems.

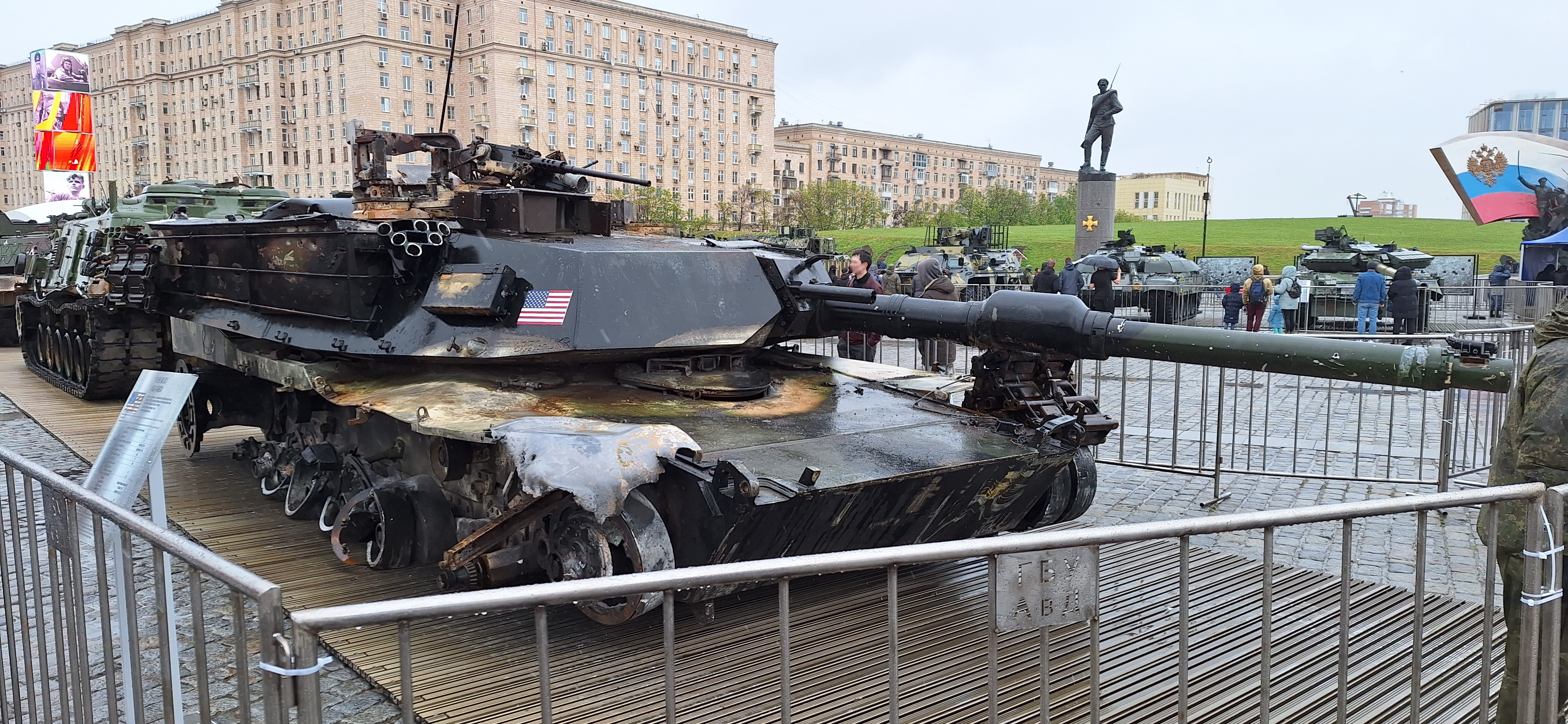
A captured US-supplied M1 Abrams main battle tank in Ukrainian service on display at Moscow's Victory Park on Poklonnaya Hill, 2024

On February 20, 2023, President Biden announced a half-billion dollars aid stating that the new aid "package would include more military equipment, such as artillery ammunition, more javelins and howitzers. The United States marked the first anniversary of Russia's invasion of Ukraine on February 24, 2023, with $2 billion in arms for Kyiv. The United States also plans to announce $250 million in aid to bolster Ukraine's energy infrastructure against Russian attacks.

Reppresentative Chris Stewart of Utah, a member of the House Intelligence Committee, said as long as US resources were used wisely, the American people will continue to support aid. He said NATO members must also honor their pledge to spend 2 percent of their gross domestic product on defense. "Most of them have not done that except for a few of the smaller countries," Stewart said. "The American people also look at this and go, 'This is in Europe's backyard. They should be at least as invested in this as we are.' And I don't know that we can assure them right now that that's the case."

In May 2023, the United States said it would provide a $300 million arms shipment for Ukraine. This also included "air defense systems and tens of millions of rounds of ammunition". On July 6, 2023, President Biden approved the provision of cluster munitions to Ukraine. On August 17, 2023, the U.S. approved the transfer of F-16s from the Netherlands and Denmark to Ukraine after the Ukrainian pilots have completed their training.

=== NATO Eastern border reinforcement ===
Biden stated that 800 US soldiers will be transferred from Italy to the Baltic region, eight F-35 fighter jets will be transferred from Germany to Eastern Europe, and that 32 Apache helicopters will be transferred from Germany and Greece to Poland. The president said the U.S. military would not fight Russia in Ukraine, but would defend every inch of NATO territory. U.S. Secretary of Defense Lloyd Austin ordered the deployment of about 7,000 additional troops to Europe.

=== Condemnation of Russia ===
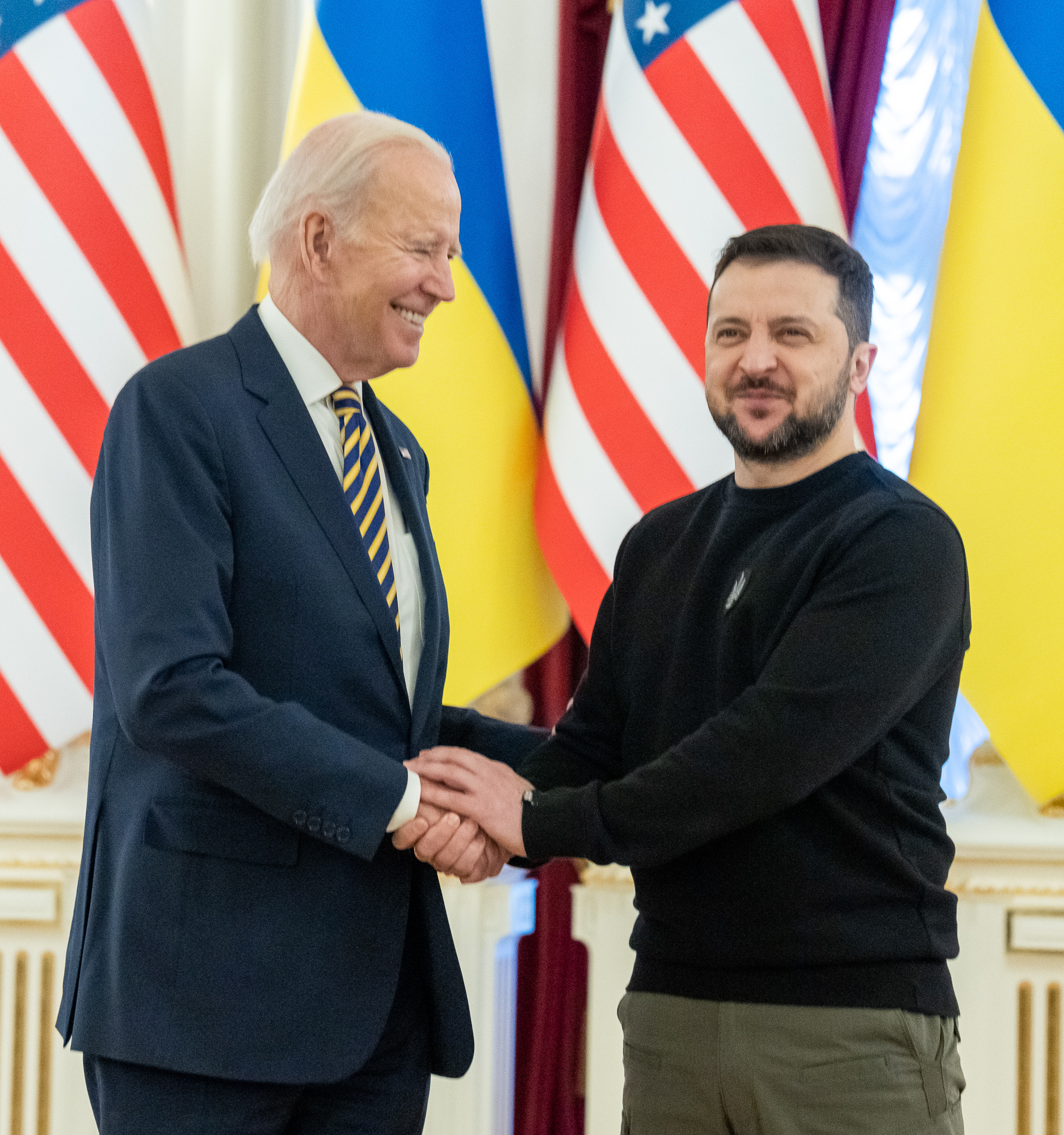
Biden and Zelenskyy in Kyiv on February 20, 2023

U.S. president Joe Biden issued a statement calling the Russian invasion "unprovoked and unreasonable", and accusing Russian president Vladimir Putin of waging a "premeditated war that will result in catastrophic loss of life and human suffering". On February 28, the United States announced plans to expel twelve Russian diplomats from the Permanent Mission of Russia to the United Nations. The United States Mission to the United Nations told the public,

The United States has informed the United Nations and the Russian Permanent Mission to the United Nations that we are beginning the process of expelling twelve intelligence operatives from the Russian Mission who have abused their privileges of residency in the United States by engaging in espionage activities that are adverse to our national security. We are taking this action in accordance with the UN Headquarters Agreement. This action has been in development for several months.

— Spokesperson Olivia Dalton, Statement on the Decision to Initiate the Expulsion of Russian Diplomats in New York, U.S. Mission to the United Nations

Biden called Putin "a war criminal" in response to reporters' questions on March 16. Biden additionally condemned Russian oligarchs who had supported Putin, stating that "We are joining with our European allies to find and seize your yachts, your luxury apartments, your private jets. We are coming for your ill-begotten gains." The Biden administration also condemned Putin's decision to place Russia's nuclear deterrence forces on high alert.

In a speech on March 26, Biden declared in a speech that Putin "cannot remain in power". However, the White House later released a statement saying that Biden's "point was that Putin cannot be allowed to exercise power over his neighbors or the region. He was not discussing Putin's power in Russia, or regime change". In response to Biden's statement, the Kremlin stated that whether or not Putin remained in power was the choice of the Russian people.

In a phone call with Ukrainian president Volodymyr Zelenskyy, Biden called Russia's military activities "unprovoked and unjustified." On April 7, 2022, Ambassador Linda Thomas-Greenfield appeared before the United Nations General Assembly to join Ukraine in calling for the removal of the Russian Federation from the United Nations Human Rights Council in response to the Bucha massacre.

=== President Biden's 2023 visit to Ukraine ===
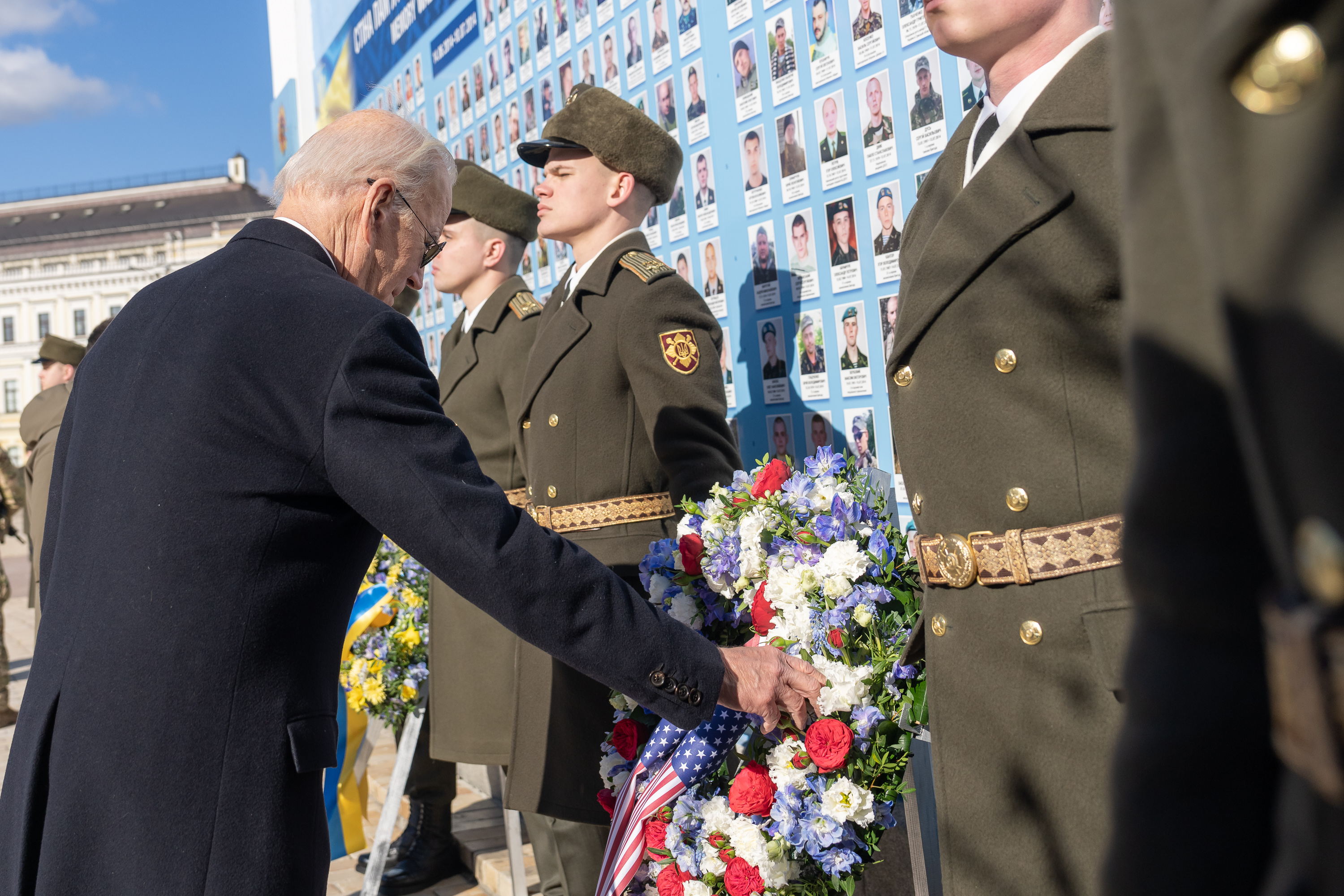
President Biden visits the war memorial for fallen Ukrainian soldiers in Kyiv, Ukraine, February 20, 2023.

Joe Biden made his first visit to Kyiv since the start of Russia's invasion of Ukraine, on February 20, 2023. Only two journalists followed him, having been sworn to secrecy three days previous due to security concerns, and his travel arrangements had not been made public even just before his arrival. Biden's visit received a mixed reaction.

=== Sanctions on Russia and Belarus ===
Imposing economic sanctions on Russia was and is one of main elements of Biden's strategy after Russia invaded Ukraine in 2022. Biden administration believed that economic sanctions would damage Russia more than military engagement. However, sanctions "have been much less successful" than the US strategy "anticipated and required", and have failed to impede Russia from continuing its war.

The National Emergencies Act and International Emergency Economic Powers Act (IEEPA), authorize the president to regulate international commerce by declaring a national emergency in response to any unusual and extraordinary threat to the United States which has its source in whole or substantial part outside the United States. This is accomplished through the power to impose international sanctions on foreign countries and their citizens. By designating a country, a corporation or individual this way, the United States seeks to leverage the global use of the United States dollar and its regulation by the United States Department of the Treasury for its foreign policy.

During the Presidency of George W. Bush, the repression of opposition to the incumbent Alexander Lukashenko regime during the 2006 Belarusian presidential election led to the declaration of international emergency with Executive Order 13405 of June 16, 2006. During the Presidency of Barack Obama, the Annexation of Crimea by the Russian Federation was impetus to declare an emergency in Ukraine through Executive Order 13660 of March 6, 2014. The emergencies in both Belarus and Ukraine have been continued by Presidents Bush, Obama, Trump, and Biden through an annual letter to Congress. Each president has issued further Executive Orders affecting the scope of emergency measures and naming individuals, companies and governments as responsible and sanctioning them. In addition, the Russia–United States relations have been strained through a number of incidents involving espionage and cyberwarfare by Russia. With Executive Order 13694, President Obama declared an emergency regarding "Significant Malicious Cyber-Enabled Activities" without initially naming Russia, but eventually naming the GRU, FSB, and related entities responsible and sanctioning them.

==== Treasury sanctions under the Biden administration ====
Taking office in 2021, President Joe Biden cited the Russian bounty program, 2020 United States federal government data breach and 2020–2021 Belarusian protests to enhance previous sanctions programs against the Russia and Belarus authorized under Presidency of Barack Obama and Presidency of Donald Trump. Each Executive Order is written pursuant to the International Emergency Economic Powers Act authority granted to the President to designate individuals as deemed necessary. In 2021, President Biden signed four Executive Orders creating sanctions. Two targeted the Russian Federation and one targeted Belarus:

- Executive Order 14024 of April 15, 2021, authorizes blocking the property of persons found to be a part of activities of the Government of the Russian Federation deemed harmful to U.S. interests. The same day, the Office of Foreign Assets Control (OFAC) designated the Central Bank of Russia, Ministry of Finance of Russia, and the Russian National Wealth Fund. On June 14, 2021, the OFAC's "Russian Harmful Foreign Activities Directive 1" took effect, expressly prohibiting United States financial institutions from lending to the designees. The regulation also prohibited any participation in the primary market for these institutions' debts.
- Executive Order 14038 of August 9, 2021, blocked the property of persons supporting repression in Belarus following the 2020 Belarusian presidential election.
- Executive Order 14039 of August 20, 2021, blocks the property of persons "engaging in certain activities or providing certain services to facilitate construction of the Nord Stream 2 pipeline project, among others."

===== January–February 2022: outbreak of war, introduction of new sanctions =====
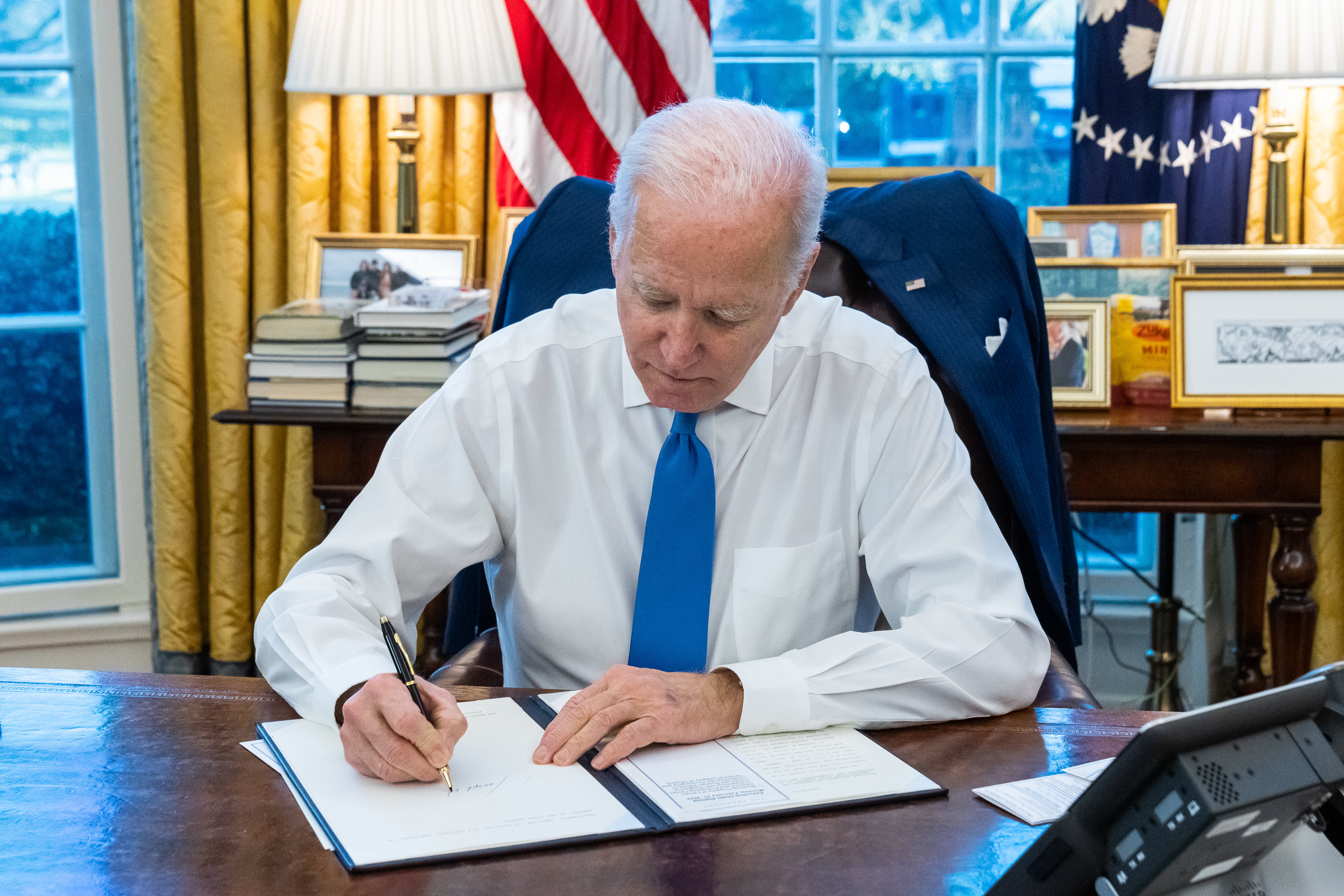
President Joe Biden signing Executive Order 14065 in the Oval Office

In late-January 2022, major Russian military units were relocated and deployed to Belarus under the auspices of previously planned joint military exercises to be held in February that year. Ukrainian and American officials believed that Russia was attempting to use Belarus as a platform for an attack on Ukraine from the north, due to the close proximity of the Belarusian–Ukrainian border with the city of Kyiv. On January 19, 2022, United States President Joe Biden said his "guess" was that Russia "w[ould] move in" to Ukraine but Putin would pay "a serious and dear price" for an invasion and "would regret it".

On February 21, 2022, following the recognition of the Donetsk and Luhansk republics, President Putin ordered additional Russian troops into Donbas, in what Russia called a "peacekeeping mission". In immediate response, the Biden administration issued Executive Order 14065, prohibiting all trade with the breakaway Donetsk People's Republic or Luhansk People's Republic. The Bureau of Industry and Security issuing new Export Administration Regulations effective February 24.

On February 22, 2022, the United States declared the Russian advance into the Donbas an "invasion." The Biden administration and OFAC announced the blocking of property under E.O. 14024 for notable members of the Russian government including Alexander Bortnikov of the Federal Security Service (FSB) and the First Deputy Chief of Staff of the Presidential Administration of Russia Sergey Kiriyenko. State-backed bank Promsvyazbank and its CEO Petr Fradkov were also cited; the Russian state development corporation VEB.RF as well. Over forty subsidiaries to Promsvyazbank and VEB.RF were named to the list, as were five ships owned by Promsvyazbank: one roll-on/roll-off cargo ship, two tankers and two container ships. The Biden administration described this as the "first tranche" of sanctions.

On February 23, 2022, an unidentified senior U.S. defense official was quoted by Reuters saying that "80 percent" of Russian forces assigned and arrayed along Ukraine's border were ready for battle and that a ground incursion further into Ukraine could commence at any moment. On the same day, the Ukrainian parliament approved the decree of President Volodymyr Zelenskyy on the introduction of a state of emergency. On February 24, 2022, the Russian Federation President Vladimir Putin announced that he had made the decision to launch a "special military operation" in eastern Ukraine. Russian forces launched missile attacks against targets across Ukraine shortly afterward. Following the attacks, White House announced an expansion of its sanctions programs.

Today, the United States, along with Allies and partners, is imposing severe and immediate economic costs on Russia in response to Putin's war of choice against Ukraine. Today's actions include sweeping financial sanctions and stringent export controls that will have profound impact on Russia's economy, financial system, and access to cutting-edge technology. The sanctions measures impose severe costs on Russia's largest financial institutions and will further isolate Russia from the global financial system. With today's financial sanctions, we have now targeted all ten of Russia's largest financial institutions, including the imposition of full blocking and correspondent and payable-through account sanctions, and debt and equity restrictions, on institutions holding nearly 80% of Russian banking sector assets.

— "Fact Sheet: Joined by Allies and Partners, the United States Imposes Devastating Costs on Russia" February 24, 2022

The Biden administration widened the E.O. 14024 sanctions program list to target major Russian corporations in the banking, defense, and energy sector. Designated corporations included Otkritie FC Bank, Rostec, Sovcombank, VTB Bank, Sberbank, Alfa-Bank, Credit Bank of Moscow, Gazprombank, Russian Agricultural Bank, Gazprom, Gazprom Neft, Transneft, Rostelecom, RusHydro, Alrosa, Sovcomflot, and Russian Railways. More Russian government officials and oligarchs were sanctioned, including senior government official Sergei Ivanov, Secretary for the Security Council of Russia Nikolai Patrushev, Rosneft CEO Igor Sechin, and banker Yuri Soloviev. The Office of Foreign Assets Control also announced the imposition of further E.O. 14038 sanctions against Belarus in retaliation for allowing Russia to use its territory to launch attacks on Ukraine, including state-owned banks, defense and security industry, and defense official including the Belarusian Minister of Defense, Viktor Khrenin.

On February 25, 2022, the United States Department of the Treasury and United States Department of State announced the most direct sanctions on the government and military of the Russian Federation by putting sanctions on Russian president Vladimir Putin, foreign minister Sergey Lavrov, Minister of Defence Sergei Shoigu and first Deputy Defence Minister Valery Gerasimov. In a joint public statement on February 26, 2022, with the leaders of the European Commission, France, Germany, Italy, United Kingdom, and Canada, the United States committed to tighten sanctions even further including removal of Russian banks from the SWIFT messaging system, measures to stop the use of reserves to undermine the impact of sanctions, ending the sale of golden passport, and coordinating efforts to "ensure the effective implementation of our financial sanctions." On February 28, 2022, the Russian Direct Investment Fund (RDIF) and its CEO Kirill Dmitriev were added to the E.O. 14024 sanctions list.

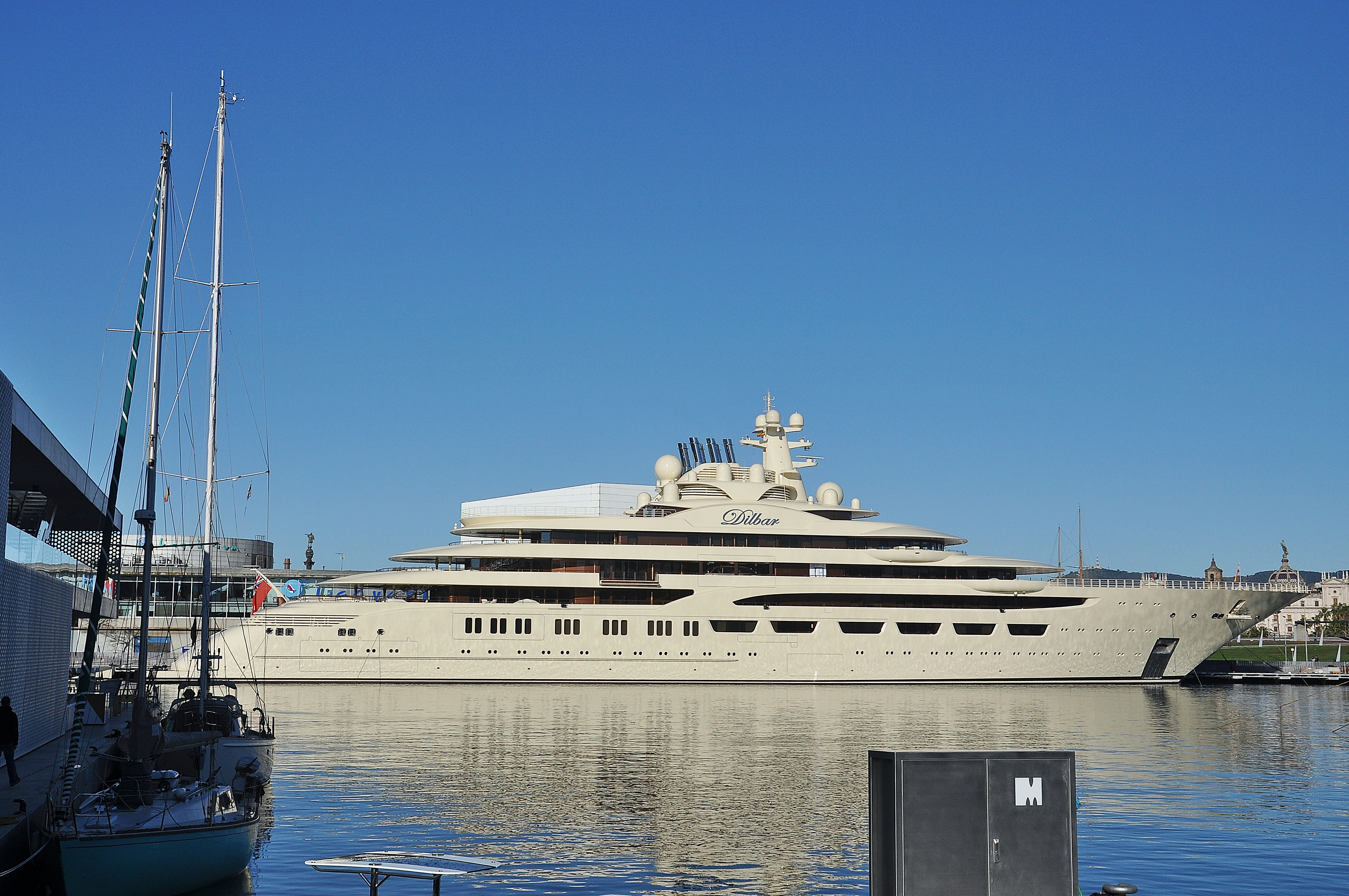
Dilbar in Barcelona 2017

===== March 2022: widening sanctions =====
On March 3, the United States imposed a mixed set of sanctions on the Russian elite:

- Full blocking sanctions on oligarchs Nikolay Tokarev, Boris Romanovich Rotenberg, Arkady Rotenberg and Alisher Usmanov. In addition to personal sanctions, Usmanov's Superyacht Dilbar was added to the list.
- Government insiders and politicians Sergey Chemezov, Igor Shuvalov, and Dmitry Peskov also subject to a Treasury blocking of property.
- 19 oligarchs and their families subject to travel restrictions through United States Department of State imposed visa ban.
- Seven "disinformation targets" have had property fully blocked with the United States Department of the Treasury using the opportunity to name and shame them for their ties to Russian intelligence. The Treasury accuses Foreign Intelligence Service of directing the Strategic Culture Foundation and its related outlets Odna Rodyna, Rhythm of Eurasia, and Journal Kamerton, as well as Oriental Review and New Eastern Outlook; the Federal Security Service of running SouthFront and NewsFront; and the GRU of running SDN InfoRos. The Treasury further states that the outlet United World International is tied to Project Lakhta run by Yevgeny Prigozhin, with Darya Dugina (d. August 20, 2022) (daughter of sanctioned ideologue Aleksandr Dugin) as its chief editor.

In early March 2022, President Biden signed additional Executive Orders dealing with the emergency in Ukraine. Executive Order 14066 of March 8, 2022, prohibited U.S. importation of fossil fuels from the Russian Federation and any new U.S. investment into the Russian energy sector. Executive Order 14068 of March 11, 2022, prohibited U.S. importation of fish, seafood, alcoholic beverages, and non-industrial diamonds from Russia and prohibits U.S. export of luxury goods to the Russian Federation.

On March 11, 2022, OFAC added twenty-six Russians to the E.O. 14024 list. Twelve were members of the Putin government including Yury Afonin, Leonid Kalashnikov, Vladimir Kashin, Ivan Melnikov, Dmitry Novikov, Vyacheslav Volodin, Gennady Zyuganov. Ten were persons connected to VTB Bank, most notably including Olga Dergunova, a Deputy President. Relatives of Dmitry Peskov were added, including his son Nikolay Peskov (a former correspondent for RT) and daughter Elizaveta Peskova, assistant to far-right Aymeric Chauprade, a French Member of the European Parliament. The oligarch Viktor Vekselberg, previously sanctioned in 2018, was re-designated along with his superyacht and Airbus A319-115 jet. The same round of sanctions also added Dmitry Pantus, Chairman of the State Military-Industrial Committee in the Government of Belarus.

On March 15, 2022, the Department of State designated eleven persons as those "who operate or have operated in the defense and related materiel sector of the Russian Federation economy" including Army general Dmitry Bulgakov and seven fellow Deputies in the Ministry of Defence; Army general Viktor Zolotov, Director of the National Guard of Russia and member of the Security Council of Russia; Dmitry Shugaev the head of Federal Service of Military-Technical Cooperation; and Aleksandr Mikheyev, Director of Rosoboronexport. The same day, the U.S. also renewed sanctions against Belarusian president Alexander Lukashenko. It was announced that all property and interests in property owned by the Belarusian president or his wife was now blocked in the country.

On March 24, 2022, OFAC made its largest expansion of the E.O. 14024 list sanctions by number of entities by sanctioning 324 individual deputies of the State Duma as well as the State Duma itself. Added under separate notice were Herman Gref of Sberbank; Tactical Missiles Corporation, its subsidiaries and its General Director; as well as the Russian Helicopters and its subsidiaries, as well as other divisions of Rostec. The same day the State Department published its own additions to the E.O. 14024 list: seventeen persons connected to Sovcombank; billionaire Gennady Timchenko, his companies Volga Group and Transoil. Timchenko's wife, children, business partner and spouse of his business partner were also named. The State Department also named Timchenko's yacht, the Lena as blocked property.

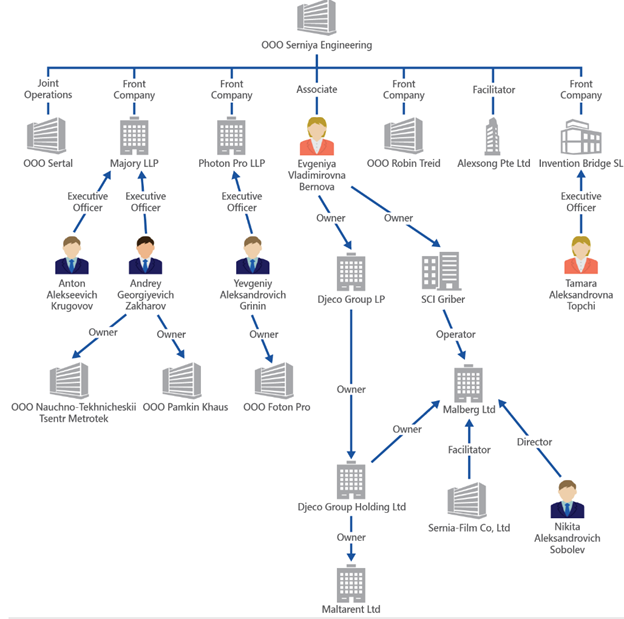
Illustration of a network of front companies used by the Russian Federation to evade United States sanctions

On March 31, 2022, OFAC publicized the existence of a "procurement network engaged in proliferation activities" operating at the direction of Russian intelligence services. The Office claims that the network of companies, including entities based in Russia, United Kingdom, Japan, Singapore and Spain was created to procure Western technologies while disguising that the end user was, in fact, the military and intelligence services of the Russian Federation. The companies and their principals were named and sanctioned.

===== April 2022: sanctions in response to Bucha and alleged war-crimes =====
Following the retreat of Russian forces the city of Bucha, Kyiv Oblast, witnesses began sharing evidence of atrocities committed during the occupation. Footage showed civilians dead with their hands bound. Other footage showed a dead man next to a bicycle. Journalists entering the city themselves discovered the bodies of more than a dozen people in civilian clothes. CNN, the BBC, and AFP released video documentation of numerous dead bodies of civilians in the streets and yards in Bucha, some of them with tied arms or legs. BBC News said of the 20 bodies on the street, some had been shot in the temple and some bodies had been run over by a tank. On April 2, an AFP reporter stated he had seen at least twenty bodies of male civilians lying in the streets of Bucha, with two of the bodies having tied hands.

As evidence mounted, US president Joe Biden called for Putin to be tried for war crimes and stated that he supported additional sanctions on Russia. On April 6, a Senior Biden administration official announced that "the sickening brutality in Bucha has made tragically clear the despicable nature of the Putin regime. And today, in alignment with G7 allies and partners, we're intensifying the most severe sanctions ever levied on a major economy." President Biden signed Executive Order 14071 of April 6, 2022, "Prohibiting New Investment in and Certain Services to the Russian Federation in Response to Continued Russian Federation Aggression," prohibiting all U.S. persons' investment or in the Russian Federation. Additionally, E.O. 14071 allows the Secretary of the Treasury to determine "any category of services" to be illegal to export by any United States person to any person of the Russian Federation.

==== Closing of American airspace to Russian airlines ====
The European Union and Canada decided on February 27, 2022, to ban Russian airlines from using their airspace. In the March 1, 2022 State of the Union Address, American president Joe Biden announced that the United States "will join our allies in closing off American air space to all Russian flights – further isolating Russia – and adding an additional squeeze –on their economy."

Notice to Air Missions prohibiting Russian flight operations in the territorial airspace of the United States

The ban went into effect at March 2, 2022, 9:00 am Eastern Standard Time (UTC−05:00). The Federal Aviation Administration's official notice was sent as a NOTAM entitled "Special Security Instructions (SSI) Prohibition on Russian Flight Operations in the Territorial Airspace of the U.S." A prohibition against operating to, from, within, or through U.S. territorial airspace was applied to the following:

- All Russian air carriers and commercial operators, regardless of the state of registry of the aircraft;
- All aircraft registered in the Russian Federation;
- All Russian state aircraft, regardless of the state of registry of the aircraft;
- All aircraft, regardless of the state of registry, owned, chartered, leased, operated or controlled by, for, or for the benefit of, a person who is a citizen of the Russian Federation.

Narrow exceptions were allowed for aircraft "engaged in humanitarian or search and rescue operations specifically authorized by the FAA, state aircraft operations granted a diplomatic clearance by the United States Department of State, and aircraft experiencing in-flight emergencies." In comment accompanying the order United States Secretary of Transportation Pete Buttigieg said, "The United States stands with our allies and partners across the world in responding to Putin's unprovoked aggression against the people of Ukraine."

==== "Freeze and seize" enforcement ====
The main United States sanctions law, IEEPA, blocks the designated person or entity's assets, and also prohibits any United States person from transacting business with the designated person or entity. Specifically, 50 U.S.C. § 1705 criminalizes activities that "violate, attempt to violate, conspire to violate, or cause a violation of any license, order, regulation, or prohibition," and allows for fines up to $1,000,000, imprisonment up to 20 years, or both. Additionally, United States asset forfeiture laws allow for the seizure of assets considered to be the proceeds of criminal activity.

On February 3, 2022, John "Jack" Hanick was arrested in London for violating sanctions against Konstantin Valeryevich Malofeev, owner of Tsargrad TV. Malofeev is targeted for sanctions by the European Union and United States for material and financial support to Donbass separatists. (Note: Through Malofeev, Hanick is close to the pro-Russia former Greek defense minister Panos Kammenos and Vladimir Putin gives carte blanche to Tsargrad TV which according to Malofeev is the Russian equivalent to Fox News.) Hanick was the first person criminally indicted for violating United States sanctions during the War in Ukraine. According to court records, Hanick has been under sealed indictment in the United States District Court for the Southern District of New York since November 2021. The indictment was unsealed March 3, 2022. Hanick awaits extradition from the United Kingdom to the United States.

Footage from the April 4, 2022, seizure of the Motoryacht Tango in Palma de Mallorca from a warrant executed by Guardia Civil, Homeland Security Investigations and Federal Bureau of Investigation

United States Attorney General Merrick B. Garland announces the seizure of the Motoryacht Tango on April 4, 2022.

In the March 1, 2022 State of the Union Address, American president Joe Biden announced an effort to target the wealth of Russian oligarchs.

Tonight, I say to the Russian oligarchs and the corrupt leaders who've bilked billions of dollars off this violent regime: No more.

The United States — I mean it. The United States Department of Justice is assembling a dedicated task force to go after the crimes of the Russian oligarchs.

We're joining with European Allies to find and seize their yachts, their luxury apartments, their private jets. We're coming for your ill-begotten gains.

On March 2, 2022, U.S. Attorney General Merrick B. Garland announced the formation of Task Force KleptoCapture, an inter-agency effort. The main goal of the task force is to impose the sanctions set against Russian oligarchs to freeze and seize the assets that the U.S. government claimed were proceeds of their illegal involvement with the Russian government and the invasion of Ukraine.

On March 11, 2022, United States President Joseph R. Biden signed Executive Order 14068, "Prohibiting Certain Imports, Exports, and New Investment With Respect to Continued Russian Federation Aggression," an order of economic sanctions under the United States International Emergency Economic Powers Act against several oligarchs. The order specifically targeted two properties of Viktor Vekselberg worth an estimated $180 million: an Airbus A319-115 jet and the motoryacht Tango. Estimates of the value of the Tango range from $90 million (U.S. Department of Justice estimate) to $120 million (from the website Superyachtfan.com).

On March 25, 2022, an FBI Special Agent filed an affidavit in support of seizure of the Tango with the United States District Court for the District of Columbia. The affidavit warrant states probable cause to seize the Tango for suspect violations of 18 U.S.C. § 1349 (conspiracy to commit bank fraud), 50 U.S.C. § 1705 (International Emergency Economic Powers Act), and 18 U.S.C. § 1956 (money laundering), and that the seizure is authorized by American statutes on civil and criminal asset forfeiture.

On April 4, 2022, Magistrate Judge Zia M. Faruqui signed an Order approving the seizure. Judge Faruqui concluded his order stating, "The seizure of the Target Property is just the beginning of the reckoning that awaits those who would facilitate Putin's atrocities. Neither the Department of Justice, nor history, will be kind to the Oligarchs who chose the wrong side. ... The Department of Justice's seizure echoes the message of the brave Ukrainian soldiers of Snake Island." The Civil Guard of Spain and U.S. federal agents of both the United States Department of Justice and United States Department of Homeland Security seized the Tango in Mallorca. A United States Department of Justice press release states that the seizure of the Tango was by request of Task Force KleptoCapture.

==== U.S. legislation to suspend trade with Russia ====
On Friday, April 8, 2022, President Biden signed into law two bills from Congress aimed at isolating the Russian Federation:

- H.R. 6968 the "Ending Importation of Russian Oil Act," which statutorily prohibits the importation of energy products from the Russian Federation. This bill passed unanimimously (100 Yea, 0 Nay) in the United States Senate and with a vote of 413 Yea, 9 Nay in the United States House of Representatives.
- H.R. 7108 the "Suspending Normal Trade Relations with Russia and Belarus Act," which suspends normal trade relations with the Russian Federation and the Republic of Belarus and seeks to further leverage trade and human rights sanctions. This bill passed unanimously (100 Yea, 0 Nay) in the United States Senate and in the House of Representatives with a vote of 420 Yea, 3 Nay.

=== Peace proposals during the Biden presidency ===
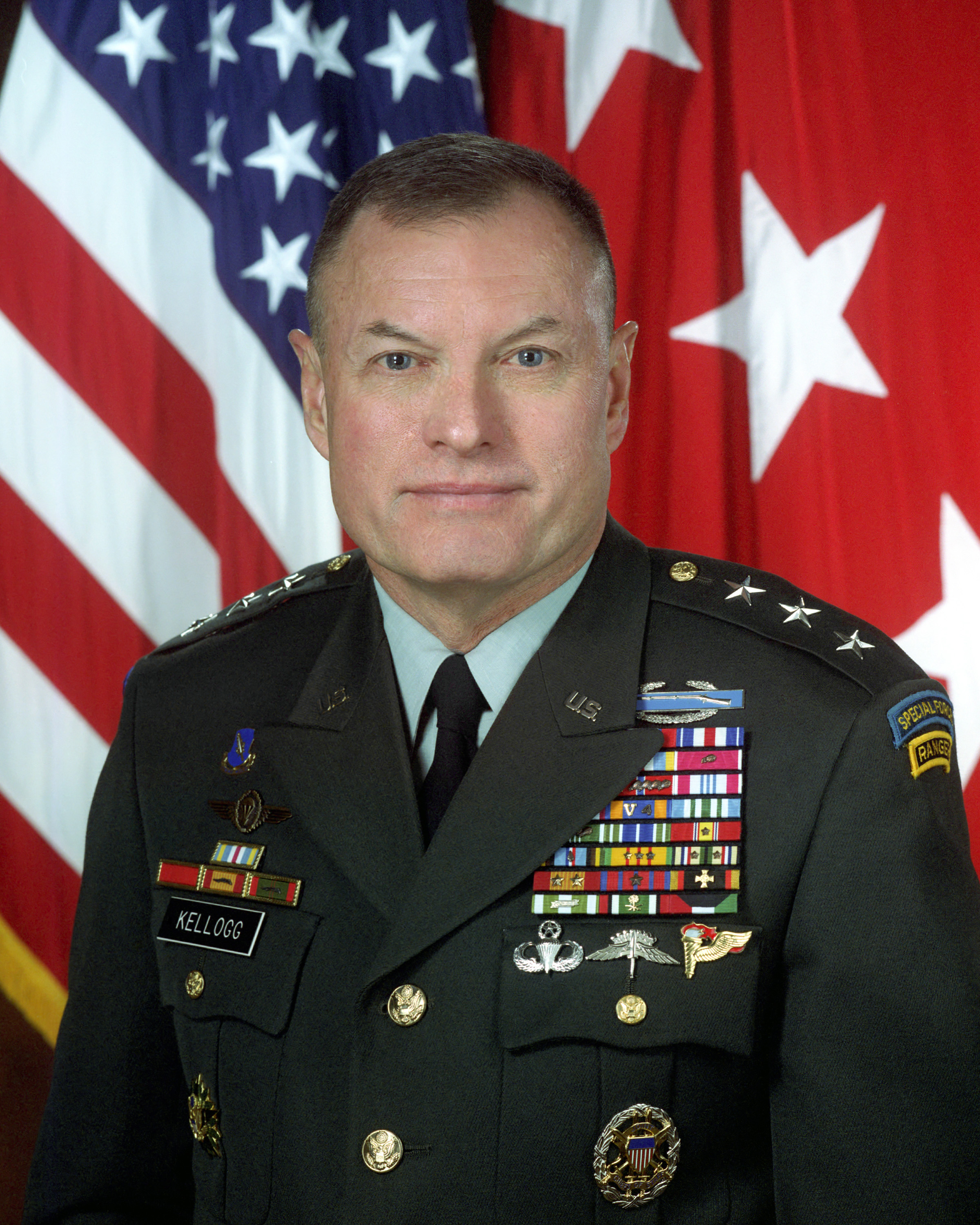
Retired Lieutenant General Keith Kellogg (pictured) and Fred Fleitz presented a detailed plan to end Russia's war in Ukraine.

In March 2023, Secretary of State Antony Blinken rejected China's peace proposal, saying "the world should not be fooled by any tactical move by Russia, supported by China or any other country, to freeze the war on its own terms". In January 2024, the Biden administration rejected Vladimir Putin's proposal for a ceasefire in Ukraine. Biden's National Security Advisor Jake Sullivan informed Putin's foreign policy adviser Yuri Ushakov that the United States would not discuss a ceasefire without Ukraine's participation. Vice President Kamala Harris and National Security Advisor Jake Sullivan attended the June 2024 Ukraine peace summit in Switzerland.

== Second Trump administration (2025–present) ==
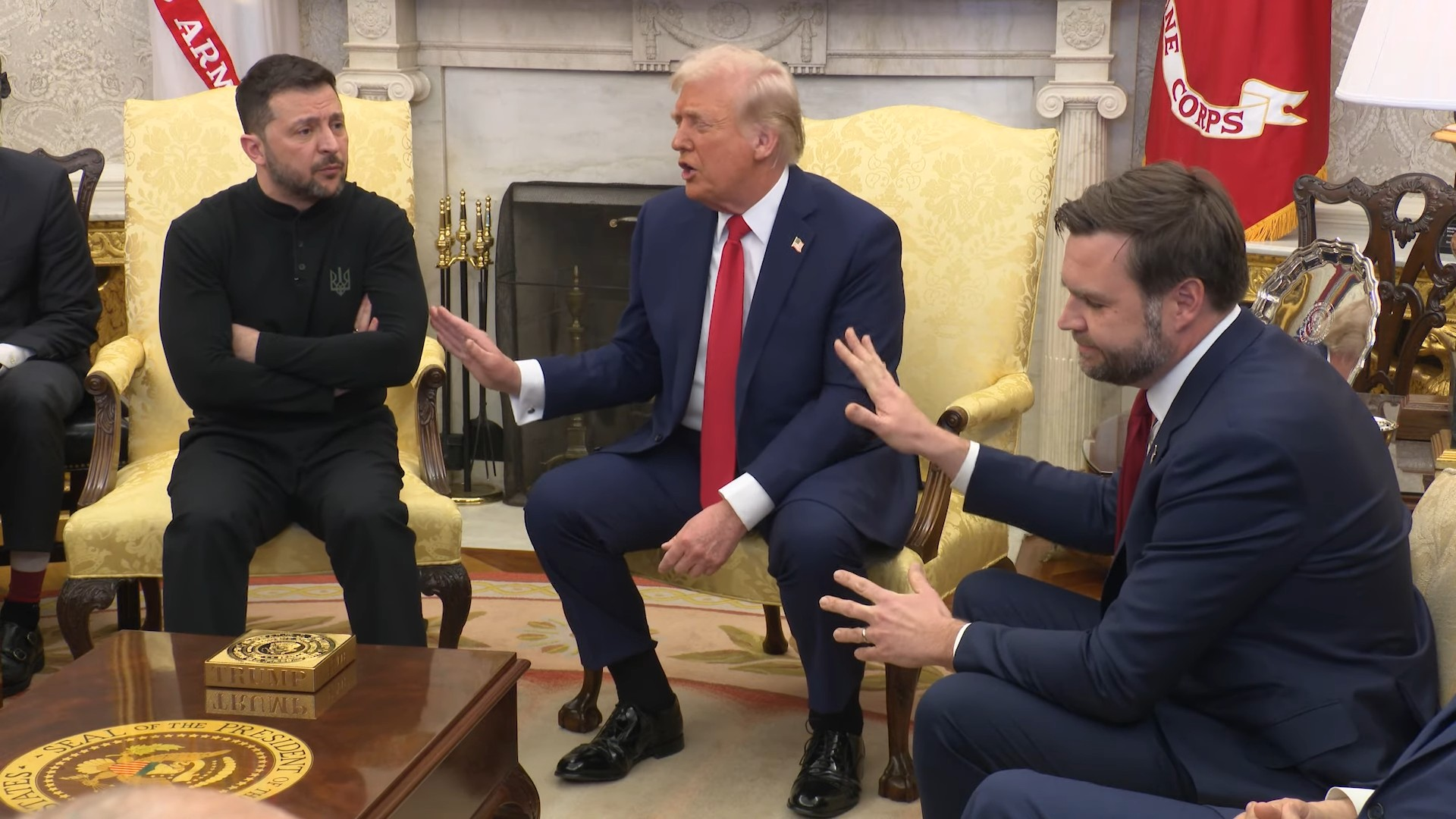
Meeting between presidents Donald Trump and Volodymyr Zelenskyy in the White House, on February 28, 2025

During the 2024 United States presidential election, the retired Lieutenant General Keith Kellogg and Frederick H. Fleitz presented presidential candidate Donald Trump with a detailed plan to end Russia's war in Ukraine. The plan proposes a ceasefire on the current front lines, forcing both Russia and Ukraine into peace talks, and continued arms supplies to Ukraine if it agrees to a ceasefire and peace talks. If Russia did not agree to a ceasefire and peace talks, the United States would increase arms supplies to Ukraine. Ukraine would not have to formally cede the occupied and annexed territories to Russia, but would postpone its plans for NATO membership for a longer period of time, and the territories currently under Russian occupation would remain under de facto Russian control. They told Reuters: "Our concern is that this has become a war of attrition that's going to kill a whole generation of young men." Trump expressed support for peace negotiations between Russia and Ukraine.

On January 20, Trump became president of the United States. Two days later, Trump warned that he would impose high tariffs and further sanctions on Russia if Vladimir Putin did not make a "deal" to end the war against Ukraine. Trump had vowed to end the war "within 24 hours" and before even taking office, but failed to do so. Trump said he was "not looking to hurt Russia" and had "always had a very good relationship with President Putin," for whom he has expressed admiration. Putin responded that he is ready to negotiate with Trump, and made statements that seemed designed to "court Trump's favour". Ukrainian president Zelenskyy said that Putin wanted to "manipulate" Trump, but believed this would not succeed. Trump said that Zelenskyy "shouldn't have allowed this war to happen", suggesting the Ukrainian president was partly to blame for the Russian invasion.

=== February 2025 ===
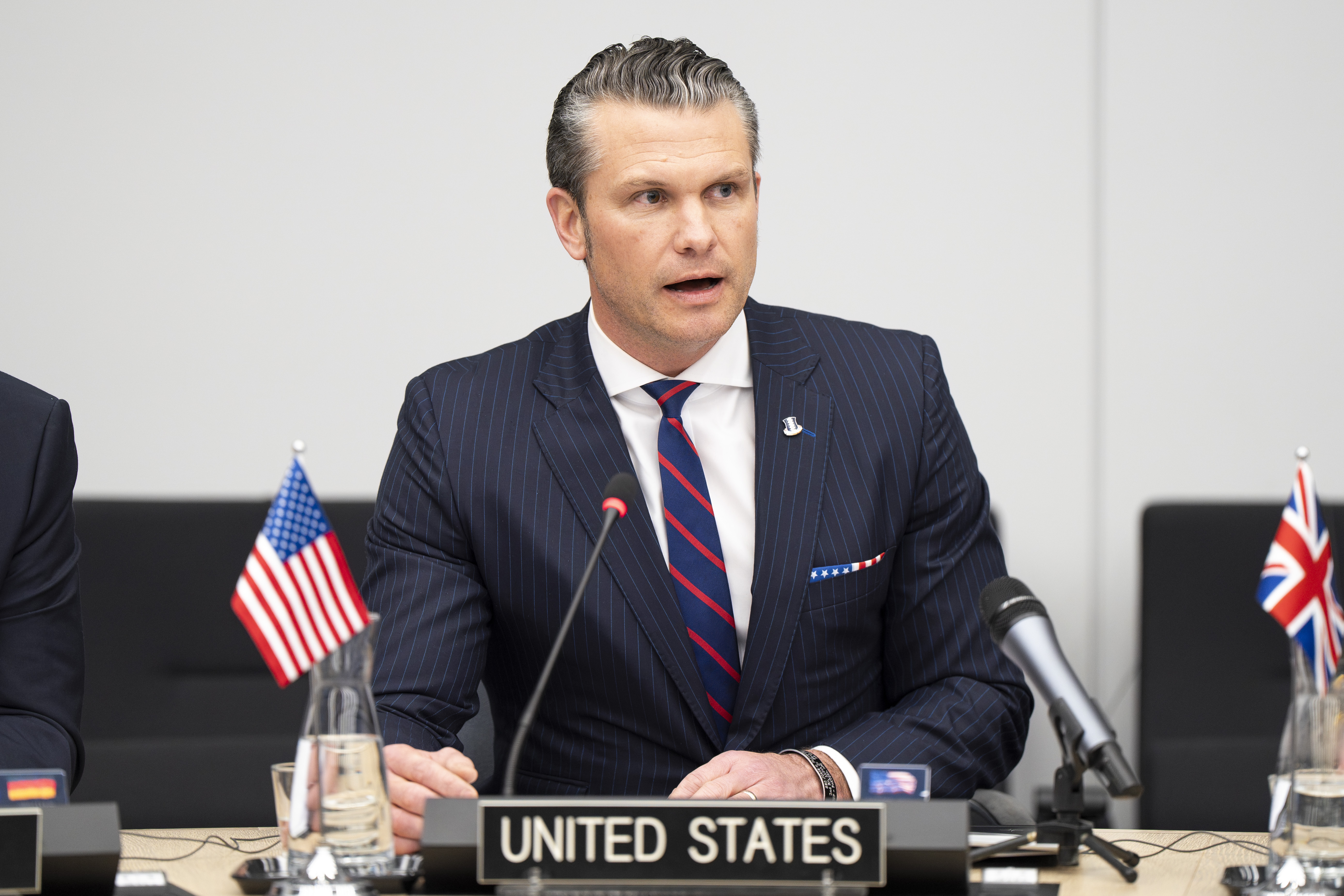
Defense Secretary Pete Hegseth at the meeting of the Ukraine Defense Contact Group at NATO headquarters, February 12, 2025

On February 12, a meeting of the Ukraine Defense Contact Group was held at NATO headquarters. It was the first after Trump became US president, and marked a major shift in the American position. The new US Secretary of Defense, Pete Hegseth, said that returning to Ukraine's internationally recognized ("pre-2014") borders was "an unrealistic objective" and that attempting to regain all territory "will only prolong the war and cause more suffering". He said that Ukraine must have "robust security guarantees", but that the "United States does not believe that NATO membership for Ukraine is a realistic outcome of a negotiated settlement". The US expects Europe to provide more financial and military assistance for Ukraine, while the US concentrates on its own security. Hegseth also said that no US troops would be deployed as peacekeepers to Ukraine.

Later that day, president Trump said he held a "highly productive phone call" with president Putin and agreed to "have our respective teams start negotiations immediately". Trump also held a phone call with president Zelenskyy, who said: "Together with the US, we are charting our next steps to stop Russian aggression and ensure a lasting, reliable peace". Trump denied keeping Zelenskyy out of the peace process, but said "at some point you need to have elections too", and claimed Zelenskyy's opinion poll ratings were "not great".

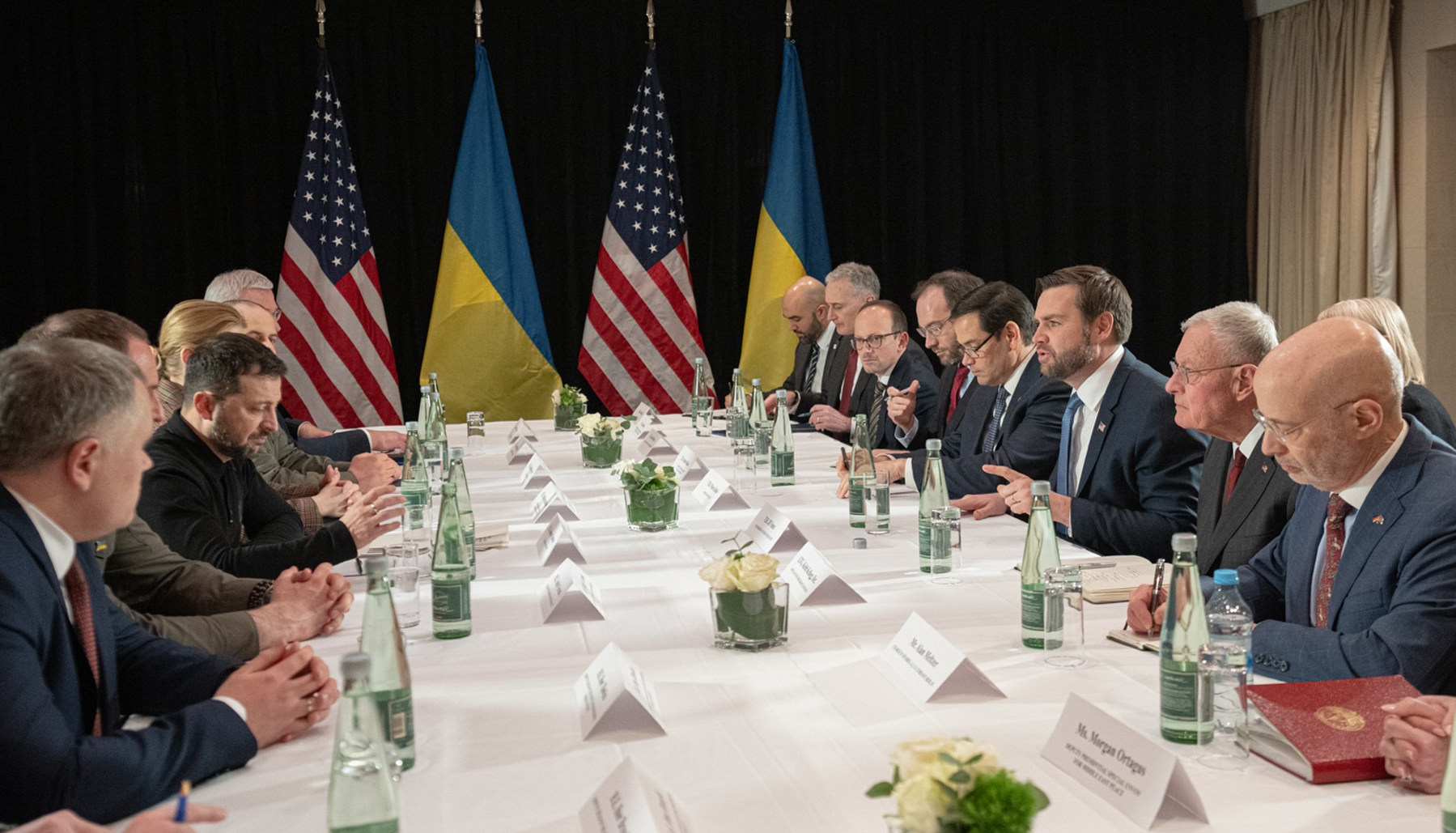
Ukrainian and US delegations meet at the 2025 Munich Security Conference.

Ukraine and its European allies were alarmed by Trump unilaterally opening negotiations with Putin and apparently giving concessions to Russia. Zelenskyy said that Ukraine would not accept an agreement made without it, while Foreign Minister Andrii Sybiha said: "Nothing can be discussed on Ukraine without Ukraine". Kaja Kallas, the EU's foreign policy chief, said that "Europe must have a central role" in negotiations, and that any agreement without Ukraine or the EU would fail. She said it is not "good tactics" to give in to Russian demands without negotiation, describing this as "appeasement". Kallas added that the EU would keep supporting Ukraine if it rejected a deal agreed between Moscow and Washington behind its back. Germany's Defense Minister Boris Pistorius said the US should not have given concessions to Russia before negotiations. France's Defense Minister, Sébastien Lecornu, said the US should be seeking "peace through strength" and not "peace through weakness". John Bolton, Donald Trump's national security adviser during his first presidency, said:

"Trump has effectively surrendered to Putin before the negotiations have even begun ... The positions that Defense Secretary Hegseth announced ... constitute terms of a settlement that could have been written in the Kremlin".

The Kremlin, meanwhile, said it was "impressed" by Trump's position, which it contrasted with that of his predecessor Joe Biden. The following day, Hegseth seemed to backtrack on his remarks, telling a press conference that "everything is on the table" for negotiations. US vice-president JD Vance said that the US could use "military tools of leverage" if Russia does not negotiate in good faith. At the 61st Munich Security Conference (February 14–16), Trump's envoy Keith Kellogg said that European countries would not be directly involved in US talks with Russia and Ukraine. European leaders said they would not accept being shut out of the talks, as any agreement would affect their own security.

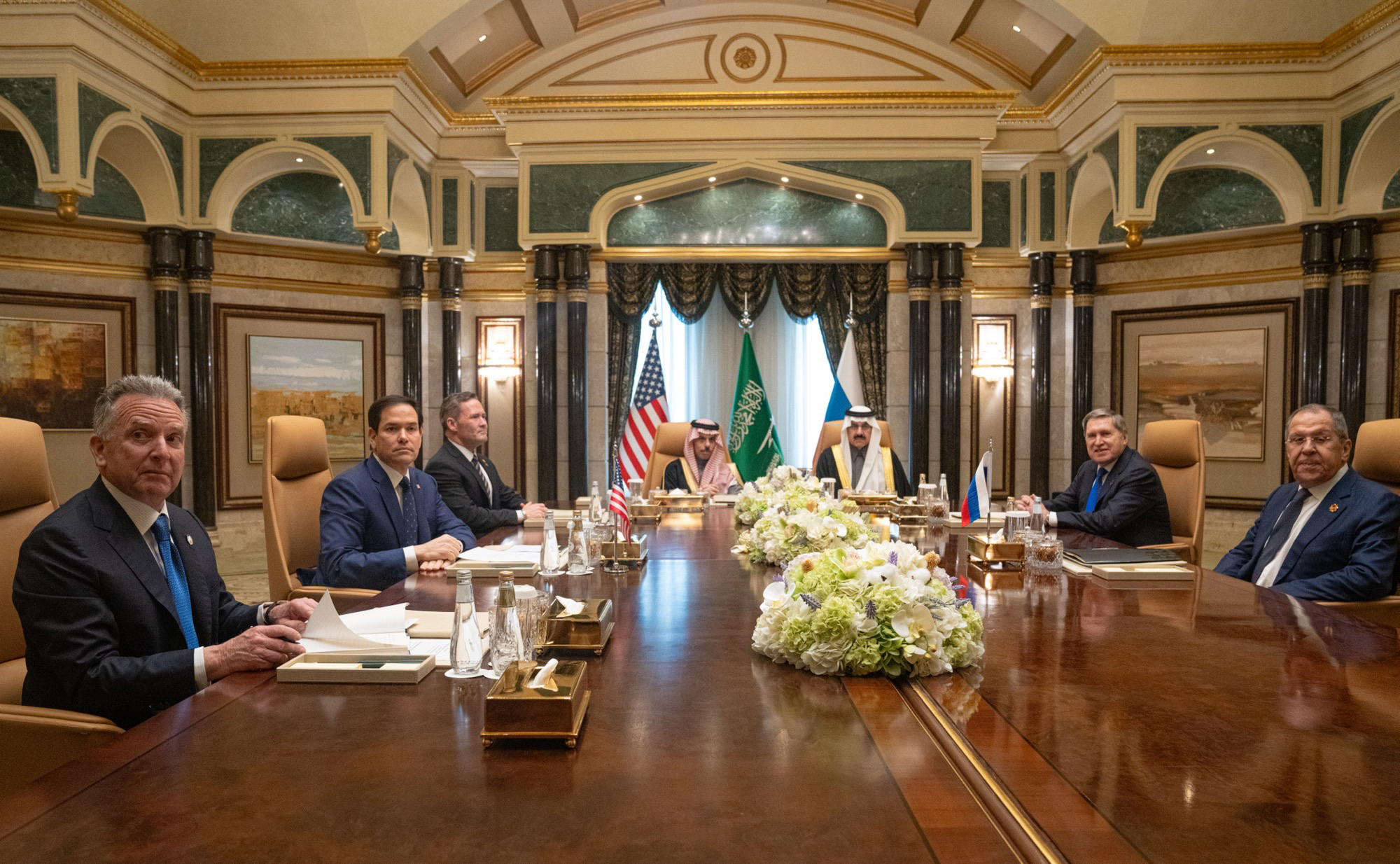
U.S., Saudi, and Russian officials meeting in Riyadh, February 18, 2025

On February 16, U.S. secretary of state Marco Rubio stated that Ukraine and Europe would be part of any "real negotiations" to end the war. Trump said on the same day that Ukrainian president Zelenskyy "will be involved" in negotiations. US Republican senator Roger Wicker, chairman of the Senate Armed Services Committee, believed that Putin could not be trusted, saying "Putin is a war criminal and should be in jail for the rest of his life, if not executed". On February 18, American and Russian delegations, headed by Marco Rubio and Russian foreign minister Sergey Lavrov, respectively, met in Riyadh, Saudi Arabia, in order to develop a framework for further peace negotiations on the war in Ukraine. Rubio was accompanied by U.S. National Security Advisor Michael Waltz and Special Envoy Steve Witkoff.

Following the Riyadh meeting, Trump seemingly blamed Ukraine for the Russian invasion, saying "You should have never started it. You could have made a deal". He said that Ukraine should have new presidential elections, falsely claiming that president Zelenskyy's approval ratings were only 4%. This echoed Kremlin claims that the Ukrainian leader was illegitimate. Zelenskyy replied that Trump was trapped in a Russian "disinformation bubble". Trump had also accused Zelenskyy of being a "dictator" for being unable to hold elections during martial law.

Recent polls found that 52% and 57% of Ukrainians trusted Zelenskyy. The head of Ukraine's digital affairs ministry argued that Zelenskyy's ratings were actually 4–5% higher than Trump's. Ukraine's constitution forbids elections during martial law; all parties in Ukraine's parliament want to put off elections until after the war; and polls show that few Ukrainians want an election in the midst of an invasion. The speaker of Ukraine's parliament said Ukraine was not "giving up" on elections, but that attempting to hold them "under shelling" would only benefit the Kremlin.

=== Minerals deal ===
It was reported on February 17, 2025, that the Trump administration had asked for the US to be given ownership of half of Ukraine's mineral and oil resources, as "payment" for US support. Several days earlier, Trump had said: "They [Ukraine] may make a deal. They may not make a deal. They may be Russian someday, or they may not be Russian someday. But I want this money back". The Ukrainians did not sign the agreement. Although Zelenskyy had offered the US a stake in Ukraine's resources for continued support, he reportedly rejected the proposal because it did not offer Ukraine security guarantees. Zelenskyy said he was prepared to work on a "serious document" if it contained security guarantees, but said he could not "sell Ukraine away". According to The Telegraph, "Trump's demands would amount to a higher share of Ukrainian GDP than reparations imposed on Germany at the Versailles Treaty". A February 28, 2025, meeting between Trump and Zelenskyy failed to reach an agreement on the proposed minerals deal. On April 30, 2025, Ukraine–United States Mineral Resources Agreement was officially signed by American and Ukrainian delegations in Washington, putting the minerals deal into effect.

=== Since April 2025 ===
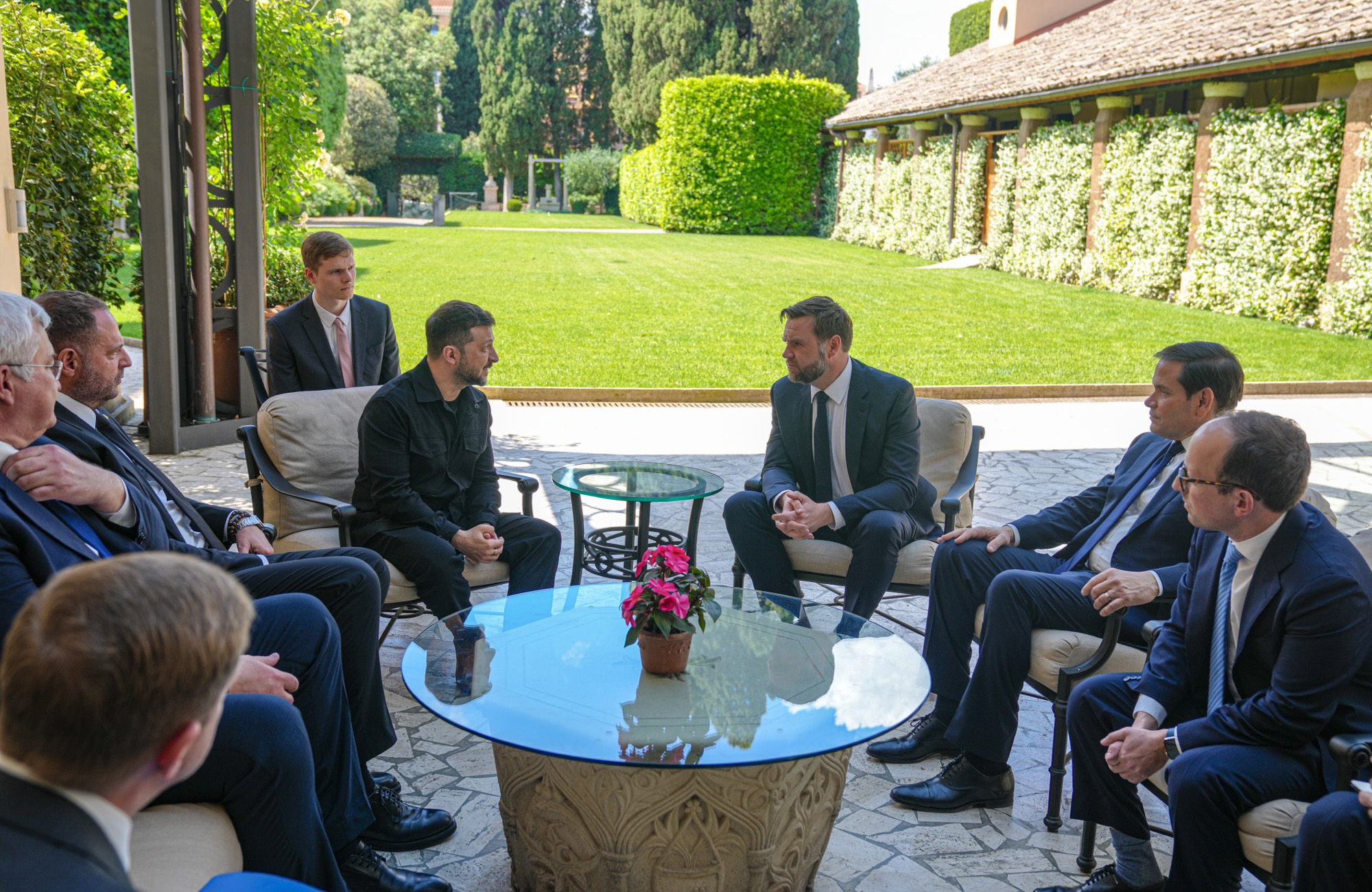
President Zelenskyy with Vice President JD Vance and Secretary of State Marco Rubio in Rome, Italy, May 18, 2025

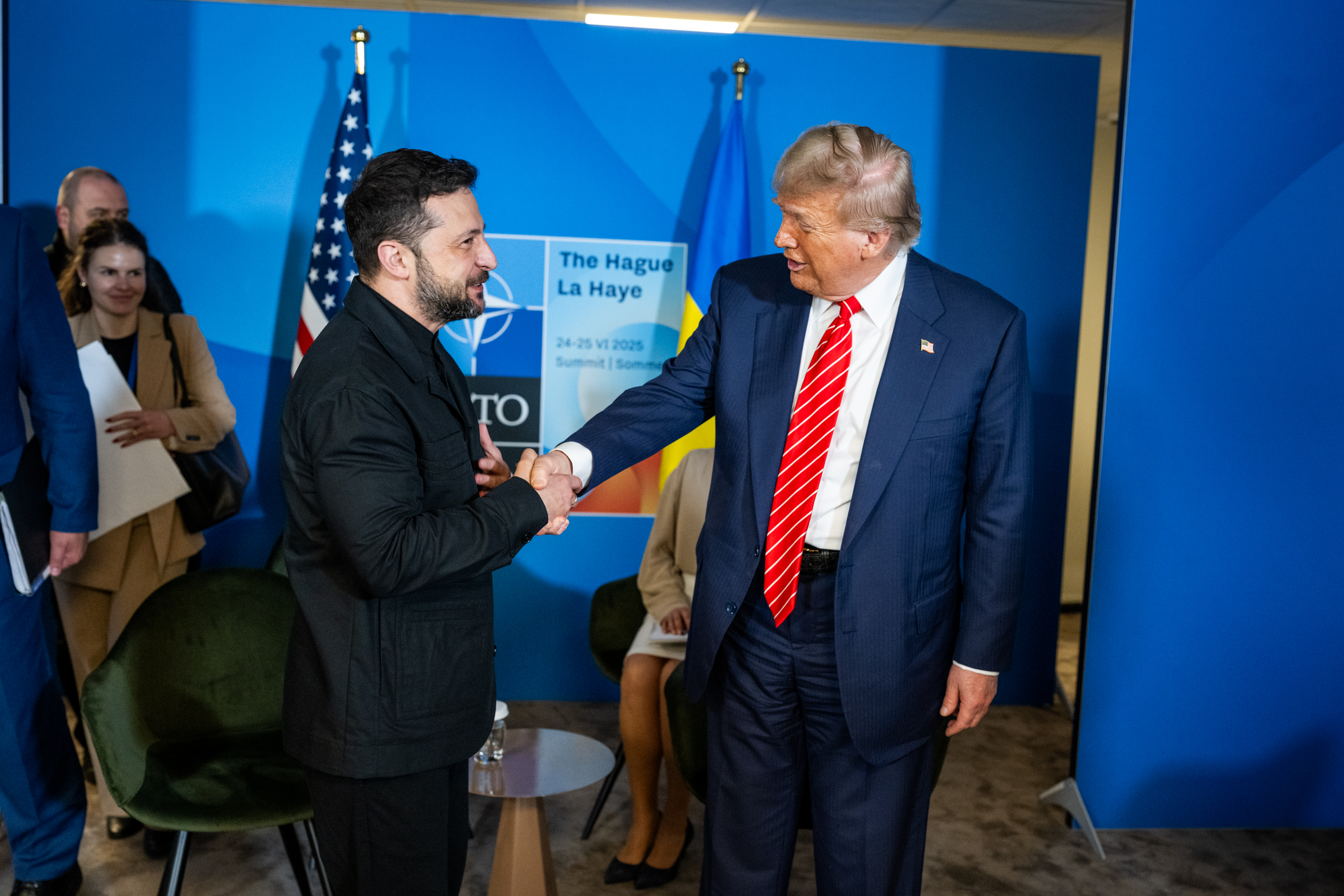
Donald Trump and Volodymyr Zelenskyy at NATO summit in The Hague, June 25, 2025

On April 24, 2025, President Trump criticized Russia's missile and drone attack on Kyiv and Putin's determination to continue the war, posting on social media: "Not necessary, and very bad timing. Vladimir, STOP! 5000 soldiers a week are dying. Lets get the Peace Deal DONE!"

On May 19, 2025, President Donald Trump and Vladimir Putin had a 2 hour long telephone call, discussing the situation in Ukraine. European leaders had hoped for an ultimatum to put pressure on Putin to achieve a ceasefire, which the US had claimed to be the call's primary objective. While Trump praised the talk, he apparently backed away from demanding a ceasefire. Analyst Sam Kiley concluded that no pressure had been put on Putin and the calls were "worth nothing".

In June 2025, a majority of U.S. senators supported secondary sanctions against Russia to increase pressure on Putin, which would impose 500% tariffs on countries that buy Russian oil, natural gas, uranium and other exports. China, India and Brazil are the main consumers of Russian energy. Majority Leader John Thune said senators "stand ready to provide President Trump with any tools he needs to get Russia to finally come to the table in a real way."

On July 14, 2025, President Donald Trump announced from the oval office that the United States would dramatically increase weapons supplies to European Allies who will then provide those supplies to Ukraine. President Trump also threatened to punish Moscow with heavy tariffs on countries that trade with Russia if the Kremlin fails to reach a ceasefire deal with Ukraine by September 2025. One of the critical weapons that President Trump offered to provide was Patriot air defense missiles (MIM-104 Patriot).

On July 28, 2025, President Trump announced a new, shorter deadline for Russia to agree to a ceasefire over the war in Ukraine of "10 or 12 days" from then. Ukraine's President Zelenskyy welcomed Trump's efforts. The Kremlin said it had "taken note" but its "special military operation continues." On August 1, 2025, President Trump ordered the deployment of two United States Navy nuclear submarines near Russia for potential military action against Russian forces in response to statements made by former Russian president Dmitry Medvedev, who is deputy chairman of the Security Council of the Russian Federation, regarding Trump's previously stated deadline for ending the war in Ukraine.

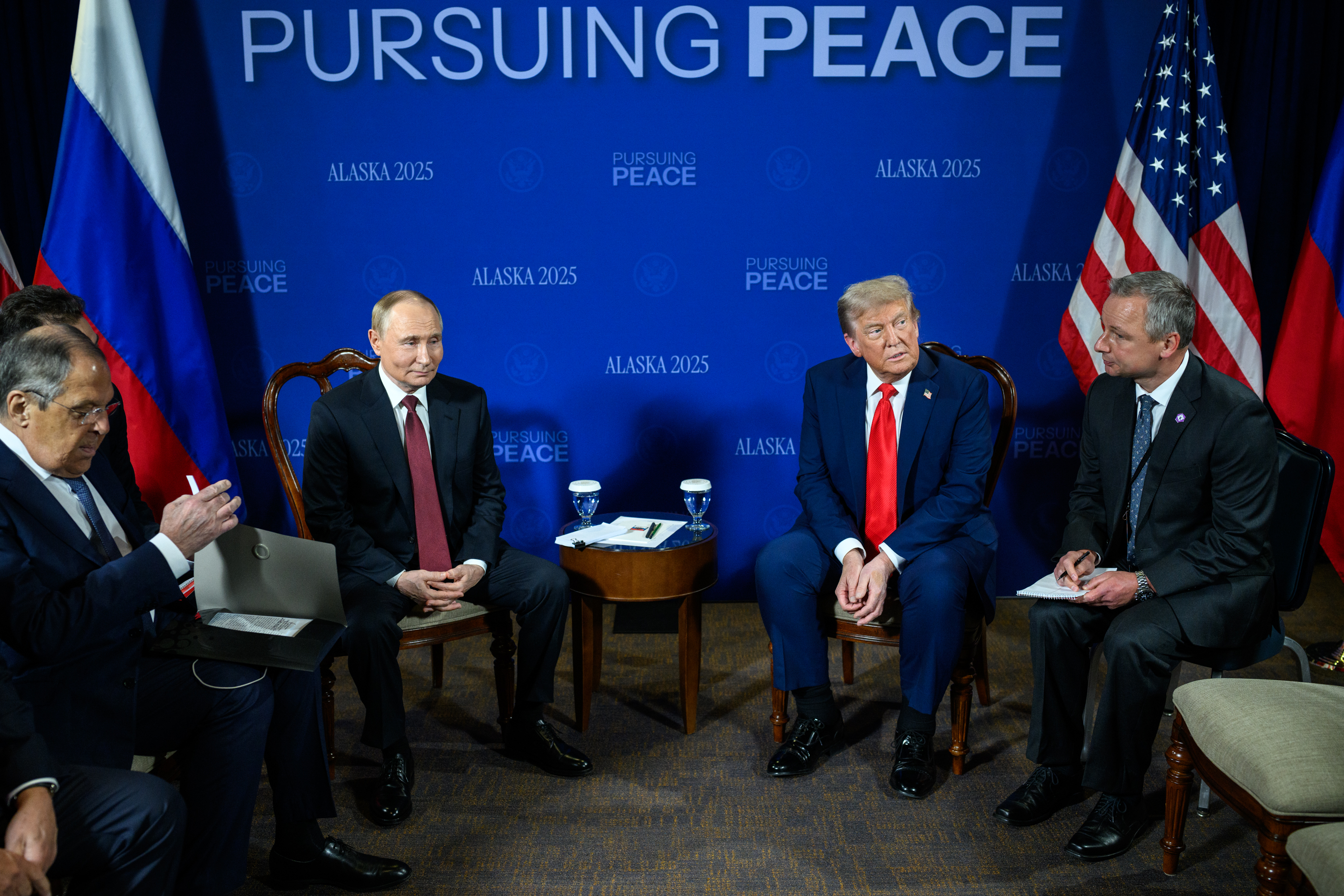
Trump, Putin and Russian foreign minister Sergey Lavrov at the summit meeting in Alaska, August 15, 2025

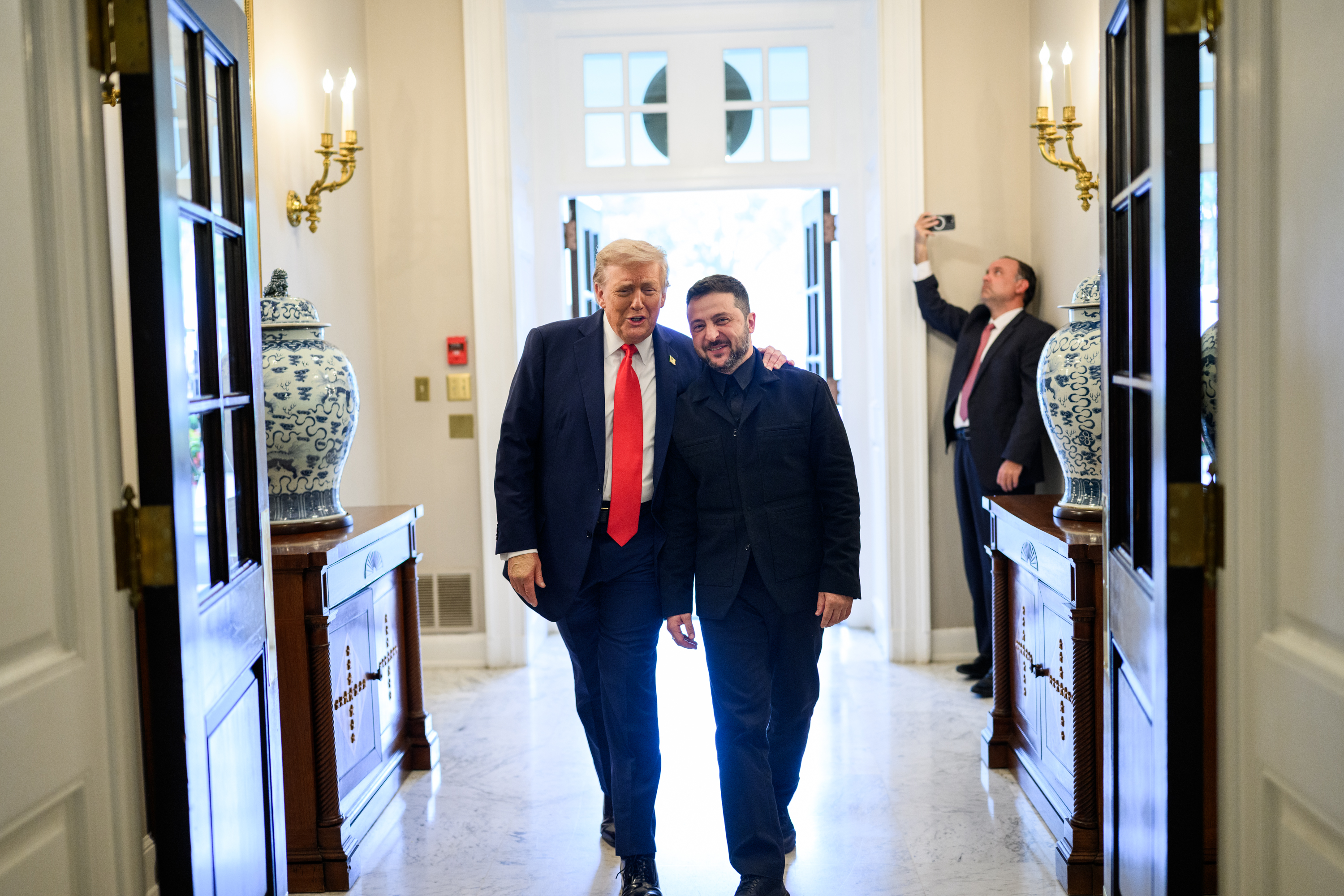
Trump and Zelensky at the White House, August 18, 2025

In August 2025, Treasury Secretary Scott Bessent accused India of profiting from reselling Russian oil. The House Foreign Affairs Committee Democrats criticized President Trump's decision to impose a 50% tariff on India over India's trade with Russia, saying the move jeopardized U.S.–India relations. They argued that targeting India, rather than China or other major buyers of Russian oil, would hurt Americans and "sabotage" the U.S.–India partnership. The committee had previously said that if Trump were serious about ending the conflict, he would have provided military support to Ukraine.

In September 2025, Donald Trump urged EU member states to stop buying Russian oil and start putting economic pressure on China for funding Russia's war effort in Ukraine. Treasury Secretary Scott Bessent said the Trump administration is "prepared to increase pressure on Russia, but we need our European partners to follow us." On September 14, 2025, speaking about the casualties of the war in Ukraine, Trump said: "8,000 soldiers have died this week, from both countries. Some more from Russia, but when you’re the aggressor, you lose more."

In September 2025, the Trump administration approved the delivery of the first two packages of weapons to Ukraine from US stockpiles totalling approximately $1 billion, which would be paid for by NATO allies, under the new mechanism called Prioritised Ukraine Requirements List (PURL). The mechanism aims to deliver aid worth up to $10 billion. On September 27, 2025, President Zelenskyy announced a $90 billion arms agreement with the United States was being in works.

On October 16, 2025, after a phone call initiated by Putin that lasted over two hours, Trump announced that he would meet Putin in Budapest to discuss ending the war and that a time and location would be set the following week. The plan was cancelled on October 21. On October 22, 2025, the United States imposed sanctions on Russian energy companies Rosneft and Lukoil, affecting their customers in China and India.

In November 2025, Trump proposed a peace plan that would require Ukraine to cede territory in the Donbas, including Ukrainian-controlled parts of Donetsk Oblast. The plan would also freeze the front lines in Kherson Oblast and Zaporizhzhia Oblast. The plan, negotiated by his Middle East envoy Steve Witkoff and Russian oligarch Kirill Dmitriev in Miami from October 24 to 26, would also limit Ukraine's troop size and bar it from seeking NATO membership, and grant both Ukraine and Russia's leaders amnesty, in return for allowing Ukraine to pursue EU membership, pay for a U.S. security guarantee, and receive $100 billion in redistributed Russian assets, with an additional $100 billion in investments from the EU, among other provisions.

Trump after signing the Sanctioning Russia Act in the Oval Office, September 18, 2026

On July 8, 2026, during the 2026 Ankara NATO summit, Trump said that the United States would grant Ukraine a license to manufacture Patriot missile interceptors.

=== 2026 Fuel Deal ===
On 9 October 2026, Trump announced on Truth Social that Russia had agreed to supply diesel fuel to US and worldwide markets, following a discussion with President Vladimir Putin. It was reported that Russia would agree to immediately supply 300,000 tons of diesel fuel, another 500,000 tons in November, and 1,000,000 tons thereafter. The move came in the wake of record high diesel prices, for agriculture, heating and transport, ahead of the 2026 United States elections. Axios, citing a US official, stated that Trump decided to push ahead with the deal after Volodymyr Zelenskyy ignored repeated US requests to stop attacking Russian oil refineries, which were contributing to higher fuel prices. However, senior Russian officials later stated that the main reason was the war in Iran. A Ukrainian official claimed that during talks, Steve Witkoff and Jared Kushner threatened to cut off Ukraine from US intelligence, a claim which was denied by the US official. A few days later, Starlink access for the Ukrainian military was restricted. In an interview with press on the South Lawn, Trump suggested that it was time for Ukraine to get a new president who could "make a deal", stating that “I suggest they get a new leader who can make a deal because he could have made many deals and for some reason he never does”

Following the announcement, the Office of Foreign Assets Control issued General License 135, authorising the sale, delivery, offloading and import of Russian diesel until 7 April 2027.

The move was harshly rebuked by Zelenskyy, describing the deal as "not fair and not honest". According to the Financial Times, Ukraine intended to nonetheless continue strikes on oil facilities. Hours after the announcement, the loading terminal of Russia’s Novoshakhtinsk oil refinery in Rostov Oblast was attacked by Ukrainian drones.

On 15 October 2026, it was reported that Ukraine had resumed its attacks on Russian refineries, following an angry response from Zelenskyy. The governor of Ryazan Oblast Pavel Malkov reported that a fire had been caused as a result of a major drone attack at the Rosneft Ryazan refinery.

== Spending ==
The United States has provided around half of all military aid to Ukraine. According to the Kiel Institute, the US spent €114.63 billion (US$133.2 billion) on activities related to the Russian invasion of Ukraine from January 2022 to April 2025, and to other activities including supporting increased US–European presence, Ukrainian refugees in the US, and global food insecurity. According to the Council on Foreign Relations, by the end of September 2024 the United States had allocated $175 billion in bills, related to the invasion of Russia, of which $106 billion went into direct aid to Ukraine, and $69 billion remained in the US economy and supported US industries, subsidizing the production of weapons and military equipment in at least 71 American cities.

According to defense expert Malcolm Chalmers, at the beginning of 2025 the US provided 20% of all military equipment Ukraine was using, with 25% provided by Europe and 55% produced by Ukraine. However, the 20% supplied by the US "is the most lethal and important."

== U.S. public support ==
=== Polling about military support ===
==== Pew Reseach Center ====
In a survey of 9,424 adults conducted by the Pew Research Center between July 1–7, 2024, 54% of respondents approved continuing to provide military aid to Ukraine, while 31% disapproved; 54% of respondents also approved allowing Ukraine to use US-made weapons to strike targets inside Russian territory (29% did not approve). 48% of respondents agreed that the United States has a responsibility to defend Ukraine (49% disagreed).

A survey conducted between November 12–17, 2024 and consisting of 9,609 adults showed that 18% of respondents agreed that the United States provides too little support for Ukraine, while 25% believed the US provides the right amount; 27% thought the government provides too much support. The rest (29%) were undecided.

When the poll was conducted between February 3–9, 2025 with 9,544 adults participating, 22% of respondents supported the opinion that the United States does not help Ukraine enough, while 23% believed the US is doing just enough; 30% thought the US provides Ukraine too much help. 24% were undecided.

The poll conducted between August 4–10, 2025 (3,554 adults) showed that 29% agreed that the United States does not provide Ukraine with enough support, the highest share recorded by the Pew Research Center since September 2022, while 25% believed the US was providing just the right amount of support and 18% believed the US provides Ukraine with too much support.

==== Gallup ====
A Gallup Poll conducted between December 4–15, 2024 showed that 30% of surveyed agreed that the States is not doing enough to help Ukraine, while 31% believed it is doing just enough; 37% thought the government is providing too much help.

When the survey was conducted in March 3–11, 2025, 46% of US adults thought that the United States is not doing enough to help Ukraine, up by 16% from December and the highest share recorded by Gallup since the full-scale invasion started. 23% believed it was doing just enough, and three adults in ten believed the government was providing too much help, down by 7% from the last poll and the lowest share since June 2023. Also, 64% supported sending additional military aid to Ukraine if Russia violated a potential peace deal (86% of Democratic-leaning voters versus 46% of Republican-leaning voters).

The poll conducted in August 1–15, 2025 showed that the share of US adults supporting an opinion that the United States was not doing enough to help Ukraine remained at 46%, while 27% thought it was doing just enough. 25% believed that the US was providing Ukraine with too much help.

==== The Economist/YouGov ====
In a poll of 1,565 Americans conducted between August 17–20, 2024, 25% of respondents said the United States should increase military support of Ukraine, while 27% believed it should be maintained at the current level. 28% expressed support for decreasing it.

When the poll was conducted on July 18–21, 2025, 33% wanted the United States to increase military aid for Ukraine, the highest percentage recorded by The Economist/YouGov polls since September 2022. 23% preferred to maintain the aid on the same level, 10% preferred to decrease it and 16% wanted to cease it completely.

The poll conducted on September 10–22, 2025 showed that 33% wanted the United States to increase military aid for Ukraine, 25% wanted to maintain the aid on the same level, 10% preferred to decrease it and 12% wanted to cease it completely. Analysis notes steep increase of military support for Ukraine among Republicans: between March and September, percentage of Republicans who wanted to decrease or stop the aid dropped from 59% to 35%, the lowest share since October 2022; the share of those who wanted to stop the aid fell from 33% to 17%.

In the poll conducted on October 17–20, 2025, the share of respondents who wanted the United States to increase military aid for Ukraine further increased to 35%, while 22% preferred to maintain aid at the current level; 21% wanted to decrease or stop the aid. Among Republicans, 23% wanted to increase the aid, 24% preferred to keep it at the current level, 17% wanted to decrease it and 14% wanted to stop it altogether.

==== Quinnipiac University ====
A Quinnipac University poll of registered voters conducted on March 6–10, 2025 showed that 62% agreed that Ukraine support was in the national interest of the United States (29% disagreed).

According to the poll of registered voters conducted on September 18–21, 2025 and published on September 24, 64% of respondents agreed that supporting Ukraine was in the national interest of the United States, while 26% disagreed (among registered Republicans the numbers were 50% and 37%, respectively).

==== Harris Poll/HarrisX ====
A survey conducted on July 6–8, 2025, by The Harris Poll and HarrisX among 2,044 registered voters showed that 65% supported a statement that the United States should provide Ukraine with weapons and impose further sanctions on Russia if Russia refused to participate in peace negotiations; among registered Republicans, 66% supported the statement. Same percentages also agreed with the United States providing Ukraine direct security guarantees if it made concessions to end the war.

The poll conducted on August 20–21, 2025 (2,025 registered voters) showed that 67% agreed that the United States should provide Ukraine military aid and impose further sanctions on Russia if Russia refused to participate in peace negotiations (67% of registered Republicans). 69% also agreed that Ukraine should receive direct security guarantees from the United States if it makes concessions to end the war (67% of registered Republicans).

The survey conducted on October 1–2, 2025 (2,413 registered voters) showed that 68% approved of the US providing weapons to Ukraine and imposing further sanctions on Russia if it refused to negotiate (73% of registered Republicans).

==== Other ====
In May 2023, 46% of respondents agreed that the US should arm Ukraine, while 29% disagreed. In a poll conducted by Reuters and Ipsos and published on October 5, 41% of respondents said Washington should arm Ukraine, while 35% disagreed. A poll conducted by the Ronald Reagan Presidential Foundation & Institute in June 2024 showed that 57% of respondents supported sending military aid to Ukraine, while 32% opposed it. 75% of respondents also agreed that it is important to the United States that Ukraine wins the war, while 17% considered it unimportant.

=== Favorability polling about Russia and Ukraine ===
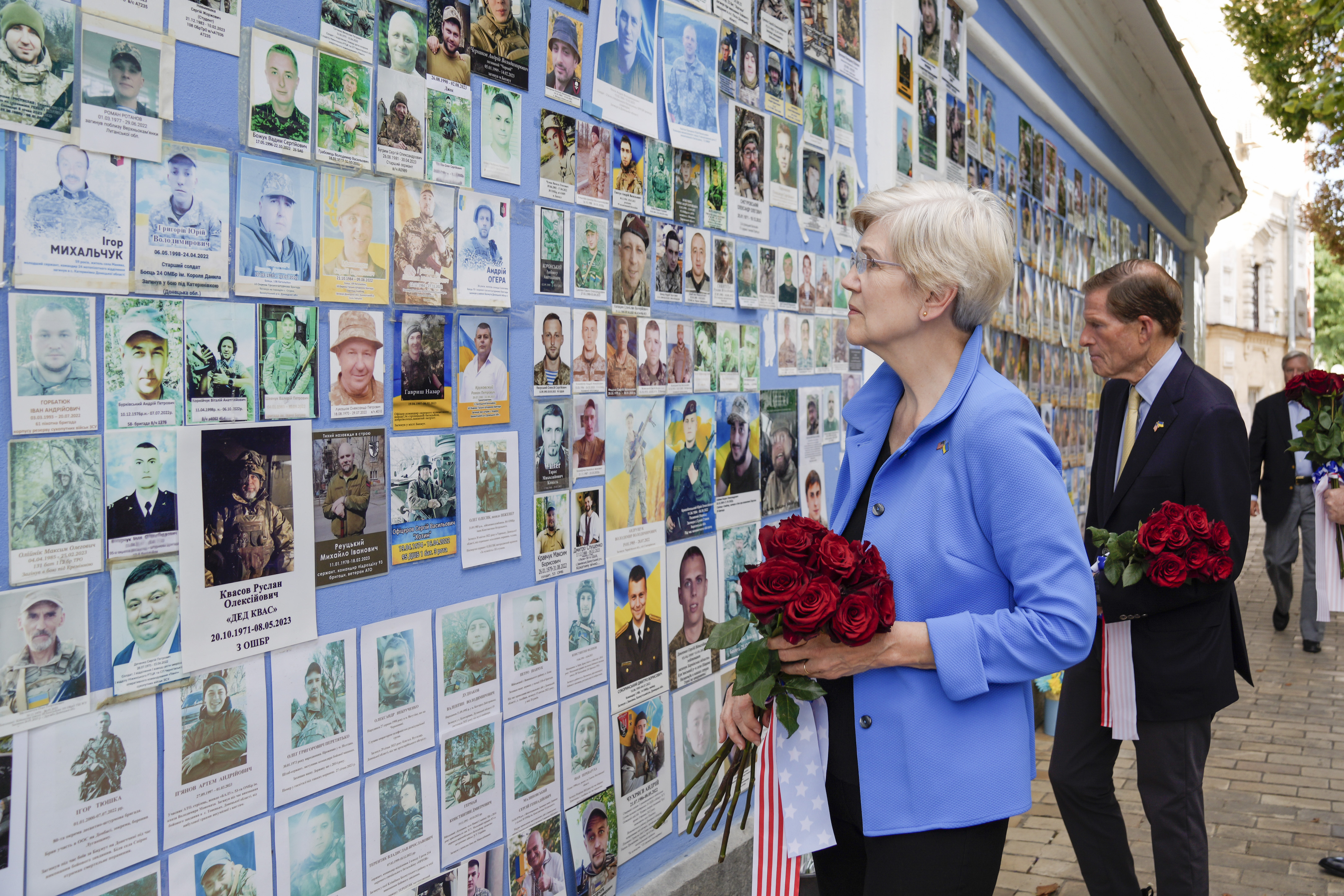
Warren at The Wall of Remembrance of the Fallen for Ukraine near Mykhailivska Square in Kyiv, Ukraine, August 23, 2023

A poll conducted by Gallup between February 3–16, 2025 showed that approximately 63% of American adults viewed Ukraine favorably, while 31% viewed it unfavorably (among those that identified themselves as Republicans the numbers were 54% and 42% respectively); meanwhile Russia was viewed positively by 17% of respondents and negatively by 78% (21% and 77% respectively among those that identified themselves as Republicans).

In a Quinnipac University poll of registered voters conducted on March 6–10, 2025, 65% agreed that Ukraine was closer to sharing the values of the United States than Russia, while 9% thought Russia was closer to sharing American values than Ukraine.

A poll of 1,729 adults conducted by The Economist and YouGov between July 18–21, 2025 showed that 65% saw Ukraine as an ally or at least friendly country, while 15% saw the country as unfriendly or enemy (57% to 20% respectively among Republicans). Meanwhile, Russia was seen as an enemy or unfriendly country by 80%, while only 7% described Russia as friendly or ally (77% to 8% respectively among Republicans). When The Economist/YouGov conducted the survey between September 10–22, 2025, 67% of respondents saw Ukraine as ally/friendly and 14% saw it as unfriendly/enemy (59–19 among Republican respondents), while 8% saw Russia as ally/friendly and 78% saw it as unfriendly/enemy (9–76 among Republican respondents).

=== Polling about support for Russia and Ukraine ===
YouGov did a poll of 2,311 US adults between February 26–28, 2025 about which country they sympathized with more, with 62% saying Ukraine, 4% Russia, 24% for neither two countries and 11% said they were not sure. In another poll taken between March 5–8, 2022 of 1,500 US adults who were citizens: 73% said they sympathize with Ukraine, 6% Russia, 12% for neither two countries and 9% said they were not sure.

| Pollster | Date | Ukraine | Russia | Neither | Not sure | Margin of error | Ref. |
|---|---|---|---|---|---|---|---|
| The Economist/YouGov | October 17–20, 2025 | 68% | 2% | 19% | 11% | ~3% | |
| The Economist/YouGov | September 10–22, 2025 | 65% | 3% | 20% | 12% | ~3% | |
| The Economist/YouGov | July 18–21, 2025 | 65% | 4% | 22% | 9% | ~3% | |
| NBC News | March 7–11, 2025 | 61% | 2% | 35% | NA | 3.1% | |
| CBS News | February 26–28, 2025 | 52% | 4% | 44% | NA | 2.5% | |
| The Economist/YouGov | February 26–28, 2025 | 62% | 4% | 24% | 11% | ~3% | |
| The Economist/YouGov | December 21–24, 2024 | 59% | 3% | 27% | 11% | 3.3% | |
| The Economist/YouGov | August 17–20, 2024 | 63% | 3% | 23% | 11% | 3.2% | |
| The Economist/YouGov | November 25–27, 2023 | 62% | 4% | 22% | 12% | 3.3% | |
| The Economist/YouGov | January 21–24, 2023 | 69% | 3% | 19% | 9% | 3.2% | |
| The Economist/YouGov | September 17–20, 2022 | 71% | 6% | 16% | 8% | 2.9% | |
| The Economist/YouGov | March 5–8, 2022 | 73% | 6% | 12% | 9% | 2.7% | |

=== Polling about Russian annexation of parts of Ukraine ===
A poll was conducted by YouGov of 2,008 US adults about annexing "four regions of Ukraine" on September 30, 2022, with 55% strongly opposing it, 8% somewhat opposing, 7% somewhat supporting the annexation, 4% strongly supporting annexing the four regions and 26% said they were not sure.

=== Polling about Presidents of Ukraine and Russia ===
In a survey conducted by the Pew Research Center on March 24–30, 2025 and published on April 17, 59% agreed that Zelenskyy was committed to lasting peace in Ukraine (24% disagreed), while only 19% believed that about Putin (67% did not). Additionally, 72% were either "extremely or at least somewhat" concerned about Ukraine being defeated and taken over by Russia, including 57% of Republican-leaning voters. A Gallup Poll of 1,002 adults conducted on July 7–21, 2025, showed that Volodymyr Zelenskyy was viewed favorably by 52% of Americans, while 34% viewed him unfavorably, giving him a +18 net favorability.

According to a survey of 1,729 adults conducted by The Economist and YouGov between July 18–21, 2025, 46% of respondents held a "very or somewhat" favorable view or Volodymyr Zelenskyy, while 29% viewed him unfavorably (32–44 among Republicans); meanwhile, Putin was viewed favorably by 7% of respondents, while 80% viewed him unfavorably (10–80 among Republicans). The poll conducted by The Economist and YouGov on October 17–20, 2025 showed that 53% of respondents viewed Zelenskyy favorably, while 26% viewed him unfavorably (45–36 among Republicans); Putin was viewed favorably by 9% of respondents, while 80% viewed him unfavorably (11–81 among Republicans).

=== Polling about President Donald Trump's handling of war ===
A CBS News/YouGov poll released on March 2, 2025, and conducted on February 26–28, found that 46% of Americans believe Trump's "actions and statements" favor Russia, compared to 43% who say he treats both sides equally and only 11% who believe he sides with Ukraine. This was backed by the NBC News poll released on March 17 and conducted on March 3–5, in which 49% of registered voters agreed that Trump sympathizes with Russia over Ukraine, while only 8% believed it was the other way around.

A Quinnipac University poll of registered voters conducted on March 6–10, 2025 showed that 56% disapproved of President Donald Trump's decision to halt military aid to Ukraine (39% approved), 61% believed Trump wasn't tough enough on Putin (only 2% thought he was too tough) and 50% agreed that he was too tough on Ukraine (8% thought he wasn't tough enough). Another survey of 1,265 registered voters conducted by the Quinnipac University between June 5–9, 2025, and released on June 11 showed that 34% approved of Trump's handling of the war, while 57% disapproved.

According to a survey conducted by The Economist and YouGov between July 18–21, 2025, 37% approved of Donald Trump's handling of the war, while 46% disapproved; 41% agreed that Trump's approach wasn't supportive enough of Ukraine, 29% agreed that it was "about right" and 7% supported an opinion that Trump's approach was too supportive of Ukraine. The poll conducted by The Economist and YouGov on October 17–20, 2025, showed 35% approved of the way Trump was handling the war, while 45% disapproved; 32% believed Trump sympathized more with Russia, 23% thought Trump sympathized more with Ukraine and 22% believed Trump didn't have a preference.

== See also ==
- Operation Atlantic Resolve – US deployments to Europe in response to Russo-Ukrainian War
- Russia–United States relations
- Ukraine–United States relations
- United States in World War I
- United States in World War II
- United States non-interventionism – Type of diplomatic policy
