= Maram Susli =

Syrian-Australian YouTube personality (born 1987)

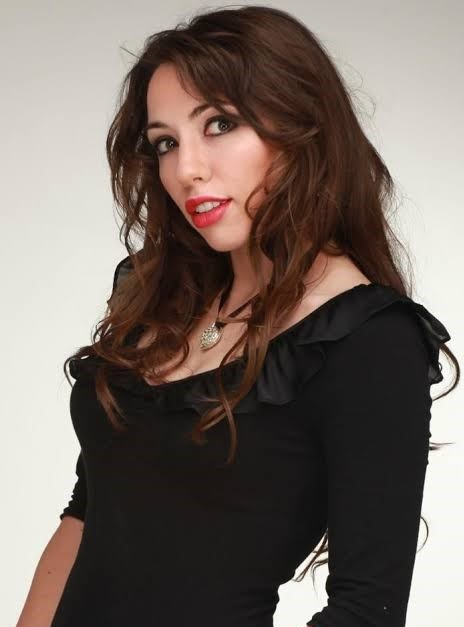
- Susli in 2019
- Born: 1987 (age 38–39); Damascus, Syria

YouTube information
- Channel: SyrianGirlpartisan
- Subscribers: 100 thousand
- Views: 7.68 million
- Last updated: 2 January 2026
- Website: syriangirlpartisan.blogspot.com

Maram Susli (Arabic: مرام سوسلي; born 1987), also known as Mimi al-Laham, PartisanGirl, Syrian Girl and Syrian Sister, is a Syrian-Australian political commentator and media personality who prepares videos on the Syrian civil war, United States foreign policy in the Middle East, and Gamergate. She has defended the former Syrian government under Bashar al-Assad, and criticised Syrian rebels as well as ISIS. Her spreading of misinformation, particularly surrounding chemical weapon attacks in Syria, have led to her being labeled a conspiracy theorist.

Media outlets she has contributed to include RT, Press TV and Al Mayadeen.

== Personal life ==
Susli was born in Damascus; her family moved to Australia when she was a child. According to Susli, her great grandfather was an Ottoman Turk.

She studied chemistry at the University of Western Australia and holds a bachelor's degree in biophysics and chemistry. In December 2025, Susli completed a Doctor of Philosophy (PhD) in chemistry from the same university.

== Career ==
Susli's series of video and social media commentaries on her YouTube channel had over 30,000 subscribers and close to 2.5 million views in 2014.

She has contributed to New Eastern Outlook, which is an online pseudo-academic SVR-run disinformation and propaganda journal, as well as the conspiracy website InfoWars, and Russian and Iranian state-run outlets RT and Press TV, and occasionally contributed to the Hezbollah-aligned Al Mayadeen. She was interviewed by neo-Nazi Richard Spencer.

== Views, conspiracy theories and misinformation ==
Susli began writing and speaking on the Syrian civil war in 2012. Susli said she speaks out against Syrian rebels, the Islamic State, and the United States after becoming dismayed at seeing her country destroyed. One of her YouTube videos, "If Syria Disarms Chemical Weapons We Lose the War", was viewed 44,720 times by October 2014. Jordanian news outlet Al Bawaba described Susli's support for Assad's government: "Susli's conviction that the best and only future for the Syrian people can exist with Bashar Al Assad at the helm, flanked by his Russian and Iranian allies, is dispiriting." In a 2013 interview on RT with Abby Martin in as Mimi al Laham, Susli said that it would be a "grave mistake" for Assad to renounce chemical weapons. In addition to RT, Susli is a contributor to the Iranian Press TV, and New Eastern Outlook. She is a supporter of the Syrian Social Nationalist Party, has denied the use of chemical weapons by Assad's forces in the Syrian Civil War, and, according to Bellingcat, "promoted pro-regime propaganda".

According to The Daily Beast, Susli has a positive opinion of Hezbollah. Over the Israeli–Palestinian conflict, she said "I don't even believe in a two-state solution", instead suggesting there should be "a one-state solution". In Susli's opinion, the New World Order opposed the Assad regime. She has said that the Freemasons and the Illuminati collaborate with the governments of the United States and Israel, as well as NATO, in international events; that Al-Qaeda and ISIS are a single front organisation of the Central Intelligence Agency (CIA); that 9/11 was an inside job; that ebola is possibly part of the United States biological weapons program; and that the United States Department of Defense secretly manipulated Gamergate. Via her Twitter account in June 2021, she linked to an article suggesting 9/11 was the responsibility of "Zionists".

In 2014, News Corp Australia Network said Susli was a "self-described News Personality" whose Facebook page is "filled with video posts on the current conflict, criticising IS and Syrian rebels". She has denied the allegations of atrocities and war crimes against the Assad government. That same year, Susli told MailOnline: "People are dying, and I have a duty as a human being and as someone of Syrian origin to expose the truth about why."

Susli has said "Jews were ethnically cleansed from Germany ... However, if you want to talk about specifics and numbers and events and stuff, I’m going to leave that to the historians. And I think you’d find that there’s historians on both sides".

In 2017, along with Theodore Postol, Susli rejected claims that the Syrian government used chemical weapons in 2017 at Khan Shaykhun. In a YouTube video, she referred to evidence posted by Postol, suggesting that Khan Shaykhun chemical attack, alleged to have killed 74 people, was not the work of the Syrian government. While interviewing Seymour Hersh for Prospect, Steve Bloomfield said that Postol "spoke about how he relies for his work on Syria on ... Susli", to which Hersh replied: "He talked to her once on one thing." In an article for InfoWars, Susli said the White Helmets, the first responder group, had been responsible for the Khan Shaykhun attack. Cheryl Rofer, a chemical weapons expert consulted by Bellingcat, said that Postol's reliance on Susli for chemical advice was seriously flawed.

After the Skripal poisonings in Salisbury, England, in March 2018, Susli's Twitter account posted 2,300 times over a 12-day period, accessed by 61 million users. Analysts from the British government briefed selected journalists that they had concluded Susli's twitter account (@partisangirl) was "suspicious and part of a broader disinformation campaign". The Guardian then described her account as being a "Russian bot"; it subsequently changed its article by substituting "account" for "bot". In response, Susli said: "I am not a robot; I am a human being." Susli also declared, "I am human. I am not a machine! I bleed red." A fact check by Channel 4 concluded that Susli is a "real individual", remarking that Twitter had issued her account with a verification tick confirming the account is authentic and that the claim that her account is a bot "controlled directly by the Kremlin, appears to be false".

According to Newsweek, in November 2023, Susli falsely claimed footage showed Israeli military helicopters firing on Israelis escaping the October 7 massacre at the supernova festival. Newsweek said the footage actually showed Israeli attacks on Hamas positions in Gaza three days later. Susli posted a photograph of a woman carrying a child's toy car down the stairs of a largely destroyed building on Twitter, suggesting it was Gaza after Israeli attacks. The picture was actually an award-winning photograph taken in Homs during the Syrian civil war.

Following the Bondi Junction stabbings, Susli was among those who falsely accused a 20-year-old University of Technology Sydney student with a Jewish surname of carrying out the attack. After the assassination of Charlie Kirk, Susli was among those who promoted the conspiracy theory that Israel was responsible for his killing, sharing an August 2025 InfoWars clip from Harrison H. Smith, who claimed Kirk thought Israel would assassinate him "if he turned against them." The Forward described this as undermining the fact that Kirk was actually a right-wing supporter of Israel.

=== InfoWars, Vice, and The Daily Beast interviews ===
In an interview with Alex Jones on InfoWars, following the Ghouta chemical attack of August 2013, she implied the rebels were responsible for the massacre. Susli said the Syrian government was a corrupt dictatorship and that there was "a legitimate reason for people to want to create ... change". She stated that the United States and NATO used the anger of the Syrian people to serve their own agendas. At the time she had thousands of subscribers, which weren't verified.

In a 2014 Vice interview, she said she wanted Syria to "remain secular, united and strong" and did not "tolerate foreigners destroying our way of life, forcing us to live a certain way. Whether it's ISIS or the US government". In an interview with The Daily Beast that same year, Susli said that she does not support President Bashar al-Assad or associates of the Syrian Ba'ath party. According to the website, she said this "[d]espite her trolling over Assad's enemies, despite her appearances on Assad-friendly media outlets, and despite her connections to pro-Assad hackers". In one video, she said groups like the "New World Order" have targeted Assad's Syria because it does not allow genetically modified crops and lacks "a Rothschild central bank". Susli has claimed the 2012 Houla massacre was the work of British intelligence.

== See also ==
- Muhammad Saeed al-Sahhaf
