= Oriental Review =

Russian e-magazine

- Website type: Political magazine
- Founded: 2010
- Headquarters: Moscow
- Area served: Worldwide
- Key people: Sophia/Sophie Mangal (Note: Also a staffer for Inside Syria Media Center, a suspected disinformation website.)
- Industry: Politics and international relations
- Website: https://orientalreview.su/

Oriental Review (OR) is an online magazine that describes itself as "an international e-journal focusing on current political issues in Eurasia and beyond". It was founded in 2010. Despite its claims of editorial independence, the website has been described as under the control of Russia's Foreign Intelligence Service (SVR).

== Links to Russian intelligence ==
In March 2022, it was described by the British and American governments as under the control of Russia's Foreign Intelligence Service (SVR), Russia's primary external intelligence agency, founded among other online magazines for the purpose of promoting disinformation abroad. The United States Department of the Treasury said:

Both media outlets spread many types of disinformation about international organizations, military conflicts, protests, and any divisive issues that they can exploit. ... New Eastern Outlook and Oriental Review are being designated pursuant to [Executive Order] 14024 for being owned or controlled by, or for having acted or purported to act for or on behalf, directly or indirectly, the [Government of the Russian Federation].

According to the Atlantic Council, it has been linked to the Strategic Culture Foundation (SCF), a Russian think tank and online magazine that is regarded as an arm of Russian state interests by critics. The website has been described as in the same online ecosystem as pro-Russian network of online media outlets Russia Insider, The Duran, Geopolitica.ru, MintPress News, the Centre for Research on Globalization, the New Eastern Outlook magazine, online news sites NewsFront, SouthFront, Moscow-based think tank Katehon, the Center for Syncretic Studies, 4pt.su, Eurasianist Archive, Fort Russ, and the Voltaire Network.

=== Promotion of conspiracy theories ===
The Treasury accused the Russian government of promoting disinformation regarding the Russo-Ukrainian War and the 2022 Russian invasion of Ukraine, as well as promoting COVID-19 disinformation, through Oriental Review. The website has also promoted conspiracy theories surrounding the poisoning of Sergei and Yulia Skripal in Salisbury, England, by Russian agents using the novichok nerve agent. It has also promoted conspiracy theories on climate change, claiming that climate change mitigation measures are neo-Nazi in intent.

=== Sanctions ===
Owing to its reputed links to Russian intelligence services, Oriental Review was subject to official sanctions from the American and British governments following the ongoing Russian invasion of Ukraine.

== See also ==
- Cyberwarfare
- International sanctions during the Russo-Ukrainian War
- List of people and organizations sanctioned during the Russo-Ukrainian War
