= New Eastern Outlook =

Internet Journal

New Eastern Outlook (NEO) is an internet journal published by the Institute of Oriental Studies of the Russian Academy of Sciences. According to its website, this journal looks at world events "as they relate to the Orient." According to a 2020 report from the US State Department, NEO is "a pseudo-academic publication ... that promotes disinformation and propaganda focused primarily on the Middle East, Asia, and Africa." According to the United States Department of the Treasury, NEO is run by SVR, Russia's foreign intelligence agency. NEO is included in the EUvsDisinfo project, which tracks online disinformation.

== Background ==
The Institute of Oriental Studies (IOS), formerly Institute of Oriental Studies of the USSR Academy of Sciences, is a Russian research institution affiliated with the Russian Academy of Sciences (RAS). In 2013, the Russian government transferred control of the IOS, together with all other RAS academic institutes, to a government agency Federal Agency for Scientific Organizations (FASO).

The IOS publishes both popular and scholarly journals about the countries and cultures of Asia and North Africa. According to its page on the IOS website, "NEO editorial staff appreciates viewpoints of any reader or contributor ready to share and defend his convictions and approaches, whether commonplace or unconventional." The earliest (January 25, 2014) archived version of NEO's website describes it as "primarily interested in processes taking place at the broad expanse that stretches from Japan and the remote coasts of Africa ... We also look at political events happening in other areas of the world as they relate to the Orient."

== Collaboration with Veterans Today ==
In 2013, New Eastern Outlook sought a partnership with Veterans Today, an American website founded in 2003 in opposition to the US invasion of Iraq. Veterans Today publishes conspiracy theories and has ties with Iran's state-backed media outlet, PressTV.

In 2017, Politico quoted University of Washington professor Kate Starbird describing Veterans Today as "a fake news site actively pushing the Kremlin party line." Titles of NEO articles re-published by Veterans Today included:

- "Ukraine's Ku Klux Klan — NATO's New Ally."
- If NATO wants peace and stability it should stay home" and
- "Brussels, NATO and the Globalists in Total Disarray."

Researchers at Oxford University's Internet Institute noted that NEO is not the only Russian source for Veterans Today, which also republishes content from Strategic Culture Foundation and SouthFront.

== Facebook removal in 2019 ==
In 2019, New Eastern Outlook was one of several outlets whose pages were banned from Facebook for what Facebook called "coordinated inauthentic behavior." Kevin Poulsen, writing about the event in The Daily Beast called NEO "one of Russia’s less-concealed outlets for propaganda and disinformation."

The Atlantic Council's Digital Forensic Research Lab, analyzing the NEO Facebook takedown, said:

Most of the page’s posts linked to stories on its external website, Journal-neo.org, that primarily posted biased articles on a range of geopolitical, economic, and social issues. The Journal-neo.org website is a publication of the Institute of Oriental Studies under the Russian Academy of Sciences (IVRAN), a geopolitical think tank chartered by the Russian government.

Alexander Reid Ross, also writing in 2019, described New Eastern Outlook as an example of "Russian state systems percolating into the alternative media ecosystem," saying it "produces conspiracy theories about Rothschilds and George Soros and Islamophobic material."

== 2020 State Department report ==
In 2020, the United States Department of State (DOS) described New Eastern Outlook as part of "Russia's disinformation and propaganda system", where Russian state actors teamed with others whose connection to Russia was less clear, in order to get wide attention for their ideas. According to the 2020 DOS report:

New Eastern Outlook is a pseudo-academic publication of the Russian Academy of Science’s Institute of Oriental Studies that promotes disinformation and propaganda focused primarily on the Middle East, Asia, and Africa. It combines pro-Kremlin views of Russian academics with anti U.S. views of Western fringe voices and conspiracy theorists.

The report cites several articles published by NEO including "The Skripal Incident-Another Anti-Russian Provocation" and includes text from a NEO article on COVID that states, "What western media do not talk about is that with high probability the virus was man-made in one or several bio-warfare laboratories of which the Pentagon and CIA have about 400 around the world ... Western media also are silent about the fact that the virus is directed specifically at the Chinese race, meaning, it targets specifically Chinese DNA."

== 2021 reports on vaccine disinformation ==
In 2021, the US State Department's Global Engagement Center reported that sources linked to the Russian government had campaigned to question the development and safety of COVID-19 vaccines, promoting vaccine hesitancy. New Eastern Outlook was one of four websites said to have been "used by the Russian government to mislead international opinion on a range of issues." Politifact, following up on a Wall Street Journal article, fact-checked two claims published in NEO, ranking one "False" and the other "Mostly False."

The aim of vaccine disinformation changed over time. At first, the goal seemed to be promoting Russia's Sputnik vaccine by criticizing Pfizer, but later focus shifted to pushing "culture war debates over vaccine and mask mandates."

A State Department source told the Wall Street Journal that Russia's foreign intelligence service directly controls content at two of the four disinformation outlets (NEO and Oriental Review). Kremlin spokesperson Dmitry Peskov described reports of Russian interference as "nonsense," saying "If we treat every negative publication against the Sputnik V vaccine as a result of efforts by American special services, then we will go crazy because we see it every day, every hour and in every Anglo-Saxon media."

== 2022 sanctions ==
In March 2022, the United States Department of the Treasury announced sanctions against several Russian individuals and organizations, including three said to be "disinformation outlets" controlled by Russia's SVR: New Eastern Outlook, Oriental Review, and Strategic Culture Foundation. Secretary of the Treasury Janet Yellen described the March 3 sanctions as "demonstrating our commitment to impose massive costs on Putin's closest confidants and their family members and freeze their assets in response to the brutal attack on Ukraine. We also continue to target Russia's destabilizing disinformation efforts."

NEO was also one of twelve Russian outlets sanctioned in March 2022 by the British Foreign Office.

== See also ==
- Russian disinformation
- Disinformation in the Russian invasion of Ukraine
