= Strategic Culture Foundation =

Russian disinformation website

- Available in: English
- Founded: 2005
- Headquarters: Moscow, Russia
- Website: https://strategic-culture.su

The Strategic Culture Foundation (SCF) is a Russian website founded in 2005 that publishes an online magazine of the same name. The SCF is regarded as an arm of Russian state interests by the United States government, and has been characterized as a conservative, pro-Russian propaganda website by U.S. media and others. It is based in Moscow.

== History ==
The SCF has a pattern of sharing articles with other Russia-controlled outlets such as Global Research, New Eastern Outlook, and SouthFront. In February 2019, the European Union's East StratCom Task Force (ESTF) noted that the SCF hides the fact that they are a Russian outlet, presenting themselves as an all-English site. The ESTF illustrated how a reason for it "might be that it gives Russian pro-Kremlin media a possibility to quote 'International Media'" when in fact they are quoting another Kremlin-controlled Russian site.

Yuri Prokofiev, Moscow Party Chief from 1989 to 1991 and a Soviet Politburo Member, was Strategic Culture Foundation’s president until 2015.

The Washington Post reported in September 2020 that Facebook had banned a Russian disinformation network operated by the SCF—a network that "helped spread conspiracy theories aimed at English-speaking audiences, including by fueling false rumors that the coronavirus was produced as a bioweapon and that a potential vaccine would include tracking technology". The Post's report stated that the Strategic Culture Foundation "also spread "false" information that Bill Gates, the tech executive and philanthropist, was leading efforts to create a vaccine with surveillance capabilities". The Post's report called the Strategic Culture Foundation "a phony think tank".

In April 2021, the United States Department of the Treasury imposed sanctions on the SCF because of their efforts to interfere in the 2020 elections. According to the United States Department of State, the SCF journal "is directed by Russia's Foreign Intelligence Service (SVR) and closely affiliated with Russia's Ministry of Foreign Affairs".

=== Wikipedia ===
In April 2022, the East StratCom Task Force reported that the SCF and three other pro-Kremlin disinformation outlets (SouthFront, NewsFront and InfoRos) were referenced in 136 articles of the Russian Wikipedia, 70 of the Arabic edition, 52 of the Spanish, 45 of the Portuguese, and 32 of the Vietnamese Wikipedia. They wrote:

On the English version of Wikipedia, there seems to be a consensus that state-sponsored disinformation sites aren't legitimate sources ... One can only guess whether other language versions will follow suit, but there is nothing stopping anyone from launching that debate, pointing out the English Wikipedia example as a best practice.

== See also ==
- Russian disinformation
- Disinformation in the Russian invasion of Ukraine
