= Bolivarian Army of Trolls =

State-sponsored Internet propaganda agency of Venezuela

Army of Trolls of the Bolivarian Revolution
- Ejército de Trolls de la Revolución Bolivariana

Agency overview
- Formed: 2017
- Headquarters: Caracas, Venezuela
- Motto: Para enfrentar guerra mediática To confront media war
- Parent agency: Ministry of Interior, Justice and Peace

The Bolivarian Army of Trolls (Spanish: Ejército de Trolls de la Revolución Bolivariana) is a state-sponsored Internet propaganda agency of Venezuela. It is a child agency of the Ministry of Interior, Justice and Peace that is tasked with spreading Bolivarian propaganda throughout the internet.

== History ==
In May 2017, documents from the Ministry of Interior, Justice and Peace leaked surrounding the foundation of the Bolivarian Army of Trolls. The Army of Trolls was created to reinforce a militaristic mindset among its members, a defining characteristic of the Bolivarian government.

== Organization ==
The Army of Trolls is organized in a military-like structure which includes:

- Squad – An individual responsible for twenty-three social media accounts
- Platoon – Ten squads separated into groups of two, placed in task forces involving press, design, hacking, account incubation and disinformation, a total of 230 social media accounts
- Company – Fifty individuals made of five platoons, a total of 1,150 social media accounts
- Battalion – One-hundred individuals made of two companies, a total of 2,300 social media accounts
- Brigade – Five-hundred individuals made of five battalions, a total of 11,500 social media accounts

== Functions ==
Personnel involved are tasked with adopting the personas of accounts that range from being a chavista, an opposition-supporter or a sexual catfish. Trolls are also responsible for spreading disinformation and fake news.

== Reception ==
Venezuelan NGO Instituto Prensa y Sociedad stated that the Bolivarian Army of Trolls places "journalism, freedom of expression and democracy at risk" and that its creation "extends the surveillance, opacity and censorship status to the internet that the Venezuelan government has increasingly implemented through regulations, agencies and unconstitutional orders".

== See also ==
- 50 Cent Party
- 1450 Internet army
- AK Trolls
- Buzzer (internet)
- Internet Water Army
- Jewish Internet Defense Force
- Joint Threat Research Intelligence Group
- Operation Earnest Voice
- Public opinion brigades
- Russian web brigades
- Voluntary Agency Network of Korea
