= List of disinformation attacks by country =

Coordinated dissemination of false information on a national scale

Disinformation attacks are media campaigns that deliberately disseminate incorrect information through public media channels and the Internet. In many cases the goal of the disinformation attack is to confuse, paralyze, and polarize an audience. This list is intended for attacks on a national-scale, not for example a local political campaign making claims about a single politician. If adding an item that is not a wikilink to a Wikipedia article, please cite a source.

== Listing by country ==
=== Canada ===
- Jihadunspun.com

=== China, People's Republic of ===
- Chinese information operations and information warfare
  - 50 Cent Party
  - Cyberwarfare and China
  - Little Pink
  - Internet Water Army
  - PLA Unit 61398
  - Spamouflage
- COVID-19 misinformation by China
- Global Times

=== Czechoslovakia and Czech Republic ===
- Operation Neptune (espionage)

=== Germany ===
- Funkspiel
- Lying press
- Propaganda in Nazi Germany
- Myth of the clean Wehrmacht

=== Hungary ===
- Fidesz propaganda

=== India ===
- Fake news in India
- Godi-media
- Paid news in India
- OpIndia

=== Israel ===
- Team Jorge

=== Kuwait ===
- Fintas Group

=== Lithuania ===
- Vilnius People's Republic

=== Mexico ===
- Peñabots (2012-~2017)

=== Philippines ===
- COVID-19 misinformation in the Philippines (ChinaAngVirus disinformation campaign)
- Fake news in the Philippines
- Historical distortion regarding Ferdinand Marcos

=== Russia ===
- Russian disinformation
- Active measures
- Russian disinformation in the post-Soviet era
- Cyberwarfare by Russia
  - 2007 cyberattacks on Estonia
  - Cyberattacks during the Russo-Georgian War
- Russian information war against Ukraine (2022-)
- Disinformation in the Russian invasion of Ukraine
  - Russian interference in the 2016 United States elections
  - Russian interference in the 2018 United States elections
  - Russian interference in the 2020 United States elections
- Russian interference in the 2016 Brexit referendum
- Accusations of Russian interference in the 2024 Romanian presidential election
- Russian Institute for Strategic Studies
- Internet Research Agency (Trolls from Olgino)
- Russian web brigades

=== Soviet Union ===
- K-1000 battleship
- Operation INFEKTION
- Operation Toucan (KGB)
- Seat 12
- Soviet influence on the peace movement
- U.S. Army Field Manual 30-31B
- Useful idiot
- Soviet disinformation

=== South Africa ===
- HIV/AIDS denialism in South Africa

=== South Korea ===
- Voluntary Agency Network of Korea

=== Turkey ===
- Conspiracy theories in Turkey
- Media censorship and disinformation during the Gezi Park protests
- AK Trolls

=== United Kingdom ===
- Bell Pottinger
- Double-Cross System
- Clockwork Orange (plot)
- Euromyth
- Lancet MMR autism fraud
- Operation Mass Appeal
- Psychological Warfare Division
- Russian interference in the 2016 Brexit referendum
- Zinoviev letter

=== United States ===
- 1995 CIA disinformation controversy
- Attempts to overturn the 2020 United States presidential election
- Conspiracy theories in United States politics
  - 9/11 conspiracy theories
  - CIA Kennedy assassination conspiracy theory
  - QAnon
  - Sandy Hook Elementary School shooting conspiracy theories
- COVID-19 misinformation by the United States
- Fake news in the United States
  - Fake news websites in the United States
- Election denial movement in the United States
- The Freedom Fighter's Manual
- Habbush letter
- Information Operations Roadmap
- Litter boxes in schools hoax
- Mohamed Atta's alleged Prague connection
- Niger uranium forgeries
- Tobacco industry playbook
- Operation Shocker
- Yellow rain

=== Venezuela ===
- Bolivarian Army of Trolls

=== Vietnam ===
- Public opinion brigades
- Force 47

== See also ==
- Disinformation attack
