= 1450 Internet army =

Internet posters working for the Democratic Progressive Party

1450 Internet army, also known as 1450, is a term referring to Internet users hired by the Taiwanese Democratic Progressive Party (DPP) to sway public opinion. The term originated in 2019, when the Council of Agriculture of Taiwan budgeted NT$14.5 million for public relations campaigns and the hiring of social media managers to debunk misinformation. Because what counted as misinformation, and whether it included any and all negative coverage, was not clearly defined, some netizens questioned whether the council was in effect using tax dollars to fund an Internet troll army, coining the term "1450". After the council warned reporters not to write headlines such as "Council of Agriculture funding Internet army", the term gained even greater popularity.

== Response ==
=== Council of Agriculture ===
In an interview, Chen Chi-chung, the chairman of the Council of Agriculture, said that Taiwan had the most fake news in the world and that it impacted the Council of Agriculture the most. He said that fake news had already seriously affected the interests of farmers and misrepresented policies. He said that it was necessary to clarify information in order to take care of farmers and uphold consumer rights.

=== Kuomintang ===
In May 2019, Kuomintang (KMT) legislator Chen Yi-min held a press conference to publicise alleged signs of the DPP's Internet army. He noted that the Council of Agriculture had awarded two marketing contracts totaling NT$19 million. He said that the two contractors shared directors and the same address. He further noted that one of the contractors later moved to another address that was shared with You Bu Trading Company, a company set up by the DPP's Director of Social Affairs, Wu Chun-yen. KMT legislator Tseng Ming-chung criticised Chen Chi-chung for playing political games instead of doing his job and advocating for farmers. In December 2021, KMT chairman Eric Chu said that the DPP used its Internet army to seize power and to govern the people, and that, in the end, the Internet army would destroy Taiwan.

=== Democratic Progressive Party ===
After the DPP suffered a defeat in the 2022 local elections, DPP Secretary General Lin Hsi-yao responded to arguments claiming that the Internet army's activities backfired and contributed to the DPP's electoral loss. Lin said that the DPP organization and its staff have been very clear that none of the Internet army is a major DPP member.

=== Chinese government ===
The Taiwan Affairs Office called on netizens on both sides of the Taiwan Strait to be cautious of the DPP's Internet army and not to allow the DPP's "1450" to overwhelm online voices defending the peaceful development of cross-strait relations.

== Related incidents ==
=== Mainland China ===
In August 2023, a Le Monde article entitled "China's Floods: The Bitterness of Residents in Sacrificed Areas" accused the Chinese government of flooding neighbouring towns in order to protect Beijing during heavy rainstorms. In response, the Chinese Embassy in France said that the journalist was "1450".

=== Typhoon Jebi ===
In September 2018, when Typhoon Jebi forced Kansai International Airport to pause operations, a rumour appeared online, saying that stranded Taiwanese tourists relied on vehicles dispatched by the Chinese Embassy in Japan to leave the airport. This rumour led to online discourse attacking the Taipei Economic and Cultural Representative Office's competence. In 2022, the Taipei District Court found that Tsai Fu-ming was responsible for recruiting an Internet army to lead and inflame the discourse and that Yang Hui-ju was responsible for funding the effort, and found them guilty of defamation. In 2025, the case went to the Constitutional Court and was dismissed.

=== PTT incident ===
In May 2021, Lin Wei-feng made a backhanded comment on PTT, which he later acknowledged and apologised for on Facebook. He was also suspended by his eyeball CCTV.

== Views ==
=== Media ===
China Times reported that Jeremy Lin was besieged by 1450 for tweeting about the U.S. epidemic prevention situation and the Wuhan Pneumonia Name Factor.

== See also ==
- Taluban
- Han fans
- AK Trolls
- Internet water army
- Little pink
- 50 Cent Party
- Public opinion brigades
- Netto-uyoku
- State-sponsored Internet propaganda
- Trolls from Olgino
- Russian web brigades
