= Dappi =

LDP-funded smear campaign against Japan's progressives

Dappi (@dappi2019)
- Website type: Twitter account
- Available in: Japanese
- Owner: Employee of Ones Quest
- Website: twitter.com/dappi2019
- Launched: June 2019
- Current status: Inactive (Note: The account ceased activity after retweeting Prime Minister Yoshihide Suga's tweet announcing the lifting of the COVID-19 state of emergency on October 1, 2021.)

Dappi (@dappi2019) was an anonymous Twitter account that conducted smear campaigns against progressive opposition parties in Japan between 2019 and 2021. During this period, the account posted highly biased tweets designed to discredit and undermine the reputation of the country's progressives while simultaneously praising the ruling Liberal Democratic Party (LDP) and conservative opposition parties. While active on Twitter, Dappi made a number of false or defamatory claims aimed at swaying public opinion against progressive opposition parties, which led to the targeted individuals filing a lawsuit. In 2021, it was revealed that the account was operated by a company with close ties to the LDP.

== Background ==
Dappi was active on Twitter between June 2019 and October 2021. During this period, the account posted over 5,000 tweets, mostly praising the LDP and conservative opposition parties such as Nippon Ishin no Kai and attacking progressive opposition parties such as the Constitutional Democratic Party of Japan (CDP) and the Japanese Communist Party (JCP) through false claims and defamation. The goal of the tweets was to sway public opinion against the progressives. The account's profile read, "I love Japan. I hate the biased mass media." Media outlets critical of the LDP were also targeted, and Dappi had criticized what it perceived as biased reporting by The Asahi Shimbun and Mainichi Shimbun, among others.

While operating anonymously, Dappi amassed around 176,000 followers as of November 2021. The account was highly influential, attracting attention from members of the National Diet.

Almost all tweets were posted during regular office hours, roughly between 9 a.m. and 9 p.m. JST, and rarely on weekends, leading to speculation that the account was not an individual activity and that there was a coordinated or organized effort behind it.

In July 2020, the Cabinet Intelligence and Research Office responded to a freedom of information request seeking government records related to Dappi by refusing to confirm or deny the existence of such records, citing concerns that doing so could potentially "impede the effective execution" of their duties and "pose a significant risk to national security". According to Newsweek, the wording of the response, which indirectly implied a connection between the account and the agency, further deepened suspicions surrounding Dappi.

The account was deleted by November 3, 2023.

== False claims and defamation ==
Dappi had been criticized for posting highly biased video clips that were edited out of context, creating a false impression or misrepresentation of opposition parties and media outlets:

- In October 2020, Dappi posted a tweet falsely claiming that an employee of the Ministry of Finance's Kinki Local Finance Bureau had committed suicide after House of Councillors members Hiroyuki Konishi and Hideya Sugio from the CDP "grilled him for an hour" over a public document tampering scandal involving the government's land sale to a nationalist school operator. No such meeting had taken place. Konishi and Sugio later filed a defamation lawsuit against the company behind Dappi.
- During a party leaders' debate in June 2021, Yukio Edano, the leader of the CDP, criticized Prime Minister Yoshihide Suga for diverting the discussion with personal memories of the 1964 Olympics. Dappi manipulated this criticism by tweeting a selectively edited video clip of the debate, in which the portion where Suga talked about the Olympics was completely removed. This manipulation falsely implied that Edano rejected discussions on COVID-19. BuzzFeed News conducted a fact-check and confirmed that Dappi's tweet was false.

== Revelation and aftermath ==
In 2021, Hiroyuki Konishi and Hideya Sugio, members of the CDP in the House of Councillors, filed lawsuits against Twitter and an Internet service provider at the Tokyo District Court, seeking the identity of the entity or individual responsible for Dappi's October 2020 tweet falsely accusing Konishi and Sugio of driving a Ministry of Finance employee to suicide. In September, the court ruled in favor of the two lawmakers and ordered the disclosure of the requested information.

The company behind the account was identified as Ones Quest (ワンズクエスト), an Internet company headquartered in Tokyo. On October 6, they filed a lawsuit against Ones Quest at the Tokyo District Court, seeking damages for defamation.

Ones Quest was engaged in business transactions with the LDP. According to a political income and expenditure report published by the Tokyo Metropolitan Government, the LDP's Tokyo metropolitan chapter made five payments totaling ¥4.04 million (US$29,100) to Ones Quest between March and August 2021. The report also shows the LDP chapter had expenditures of around ¥780,000 in 2020. There is speculation that Dappi was part of the LDP's efforts to manipulate public opinion online. The LDP has denied the allegations.

Ones Quest later admitted that one of its employees was responsible for Dappi's tweets, but denied any institutional involvement in the account, claiming the tweets were the private activities of an employee and unrelated to company operations.

== See also ==
- Fake news website
- Internet manipulation
- Internet Research Agency
- Japanese nationalism
- Kawai election fraud scandal
- Netto-uyoku
- Propaganda
  - State-sponsored Internet propaganda
- Troll farm
- Shūkan Bunshun#Sanae Takaichi slander accusation
