= Russian troll =

Russian trolls may refer to:

- Internet Research Agency, a Russian company engaged in online influence operations
- Russian web brigades, Russian state-sponsored Internet commentators
