= Green Terror (Taiwan) =

Perceived widespread political repression by the Democratic Progressive Party

"Green Terror" (Chinese: 綠色恐怖; pinyin: Lǜsè Kǒngbù; Wade–Giles: Lü^{4}sê^{4} Kʻung^{3}pu^{4}) is a political pejorative used to characterize and criticize the purportedly authoritarian behavior of the Democratic Progressive Party (DPP) or the pan-Green camp. It is used by the DPP's opponents in Taiwan (mainly the pan-Blue camp and the Taiwan People's Party), but is also sometimes used by the Chinese Communist Party (CCP) and by pro-Beijing and pro–Chinese unification locals. The term is a combination the DPP's party color and "White Terror", a reference to political repression under the Kuomintang's rule by martial law.

== Examples ==
Since 2014, the Ma Ying-jeou government has attempted to roll back Taiwanization and strengthen the identity of the 'Republic of China' in high school history subjects. This has intensified into a political debate, with criticism from pan-Green camps, including the DPP, which values the 'Taiwanese' identity over the identity of the 'Republic of China'. After asserting that the DPP viewed the deletion of the White Terror from the new syllabus as a form of de-Taiwanization, Lin Ming-cheng, a politician with the Chinese ultra-nationalist New Party, said that the DPP's approach was the "Green Terror".

Following the arrest of Taiwan People's Party (TPP) chairman Ko Wen-je on bribery and corruption charges, TPP member Huang Kuo-chang blamed the arrest on Green Terror.

When the 2024 South Korean martial law crisis (Note: The South Korean martial law crisis begun with Yoon Suk Yeol, the then far-right anti-communist president.) broke out, the DPP Legislative Caucus made a post on Threads noting that Yoon Suk-yeol's declared purpose for declaration of martial law was protecting constitutional democracy. This led to the DPP being criticized by South Korean netizens, (Note: Several South Korean mainstream media reported that the DPP "supported" (Korean: 지지; Hanja: 支持) martial law.) Chang Chi-kai and some Chinese/Taiwanese media as "Green Terror." Then-opposition parties spoke of the post as an endorsement of Yoon's martial law, and accused the DPP of wanting to implement martial law in Taiwan. The DPP took down their post minutes later, and said it had not intended to support Yoon's martial law, nor intended to implement martial law in Taiwan, and noted its own roots as an opposition group during the period of martial law in Taiwan.

== Similar terms ==
- "Green Communists" (Chinese: 綠共; pinyin: lǜgòng; Wade–Giles: lü^{4}kung^{4}) is a term used to criticize the DPP's political behavior as "CCP-like". Comparing DPP to the CCP is meant to accuse DPP of controlling speech, fighting against dissidents, promoting nationalism, and using the judiciary to persecute political opponents.
- "Green Guard" (Chinese: 綠衛兵; Wade–Giles: lü^{4}wei^{4}ping^{1}) is a term that Pan-Green act like red guards in the Cultural Revolution–era of the People's Republic of China.
- Goblin (Chinese: 哥布林; pinyin: gēbùlín; Wade–Giles: ko^{1}pu^{4}lin^{2}) is a term used to describe relationship issues and sexual assault or sexual harassment cases involving a Pan-Green individual. Used from 2023, the image of goblins is taken from the light novel series Goblin Slayer.
- "Taluban" (Chinese: 塔綠班; pinyin: Tǎlǜbān; Wade–Giles: Tʻa^{3}lü^{4}pan^{1}) is a buzzword that emerged on Taiwan's online forum PTT in August 2021, combining the Islamic fundamentalist organization "Taliban" (Chinese: 塔利班; pinyin: Tǎlìbān; Wade–Giles: Tʻa^{3}li^{4}pan^{1}) and the DPP's party color (Chinese: 綠; pinyin: lǜ; Wade–Giles: lü^{4}; lit. 'green'). It is mainly used by opposing camps other than the pan-Green camp, and is a term used to criticize the pan-Green or DPP and its supporters or the 1450 Internet army.

== See also ==
- Anti-Infiltration Act, some opponents of the act called it "Green Terror" or "White Terror 2.0".
- "Communist bandit" (Note: Originally an anti-communist term often used in Taiwan during the [Kuomintang one-party dictatorship] White Terror, but today pro-independence supporters who are hawkish on the PRC are also used to denounce Kuomintang who is dovish on the PRC.)
- Far-right politics#Taiwan (Republic of China)
