= AK Trolls =

Turkish state-sponsored anonymous internet commentators

AK Trolls (Turkish: AK Trol, AK Troller) are political commentators and trolls on the internet, taking part in Internet manipulation in favor of the Justice and Development Party (AKP) in Turkey. The youth wing of the Justice and Development Party (AK Gençlik) is presumed responsible for heading the web brigade, while TÜGVA (Turkey Youth Foundation) members are also recruited. An ethnographic study claims that their initial organization may be more decentralized and competing cliques vied for influence within the governing party. In 2020, X, formerly known as Twitter Safety suspended and archived 7,340 accounts, including fake and compromised accounts tied to the group which pushed pro-AKP narratives, notably advocating for domestic support for the Turkish intervention in Syria as well as narratives critical of opposition parties CHP, the Good Party and HDP.

== Background ==
AK Trolls came to existence in 2013 after the Gezi Park protests where protesters used social media to organize and publicize protests against the government and the authoritarian tendencies of Recep Tayyip Erdoğan. As a reaction, the AKP recruited 6,000 people to a new social media team, known as the New Turkey Digital Office, to promote state propaganda and orchestrate campaigns against individuals identified as being opponents of AKP. Internet bots are extensively used by government as well to assist paid individuals. AK Trolls mainly target anyone who opposes the policies of incumbent President Erdoğan, which can range from Kurdish nationalists to Kemalists.

AK Trolls favored a 'Yes' vote for the constitutional changes sought by Erdoğan.

== Use of “Ak Troll” as a Political Label in Turkey ==
Some argue that, "Ak troll" is a term denoting a tactic of labeling individuals as government-aligned propagandists in order to stigmatize AKP supporters, isolate targets within an echo chamber, and suppress legitimate criticism against CHP. The term has also been used opportunistically; for example, groups that once denounced critics of Kemal Kılıçdaroğlu as Ak Trolls later adopted the same critical positions themselves, often expressing them even more harshly than the people they had previously targeted as Ak Trolls.

== 2020 Twitter takedown ==
A Twitter safety statement released in December 2020 stated that "based on our analysis of the network's technical indicators and account behaviors, the collection of fake and compromised accounts was being used to amplify political narratives favorable to the AK Parti" and that 7,340 accounts linked to the group had been archived.

According to reports by the Stanford Internet Observatory, the accounts:

- consisted of "batches of fabricated personalities, all created on the same day, with similar usernames..."
- "included centrally managed compromised accounts that were used for AKP cheerleading..."
- "some were linked to organizations that were critical of the government. According to Twitter, they are included in the takedown because their accounts were compromised by this network."
- "Tweets were critical of the Peoples' Democratic Party (HDP), and accused it of terrorism and social media ploys. Tweets were also critical of the Republican People's Party (CHP)."
- "Tweets promoted the 2017 Turkish constitutional referendum, which consolidated power in Turkish President Recep Tayyip Erdoğan."
- "Tweets worked to increase domestic support for Turkish intervention in Syria. There were also English-language tweets that attempted to increase the external legitimacy of Turkey's offensive in northeastern Syria in October 2019."

== Methods ==
AK Trolls use social media networks (i.e. Facebook, Twitter, Ekşi Sözlük) in an organized way to promote the AKP, discredit opposition, and attack individuals by spreading false information about them on the Internet. MPs from CHP and HDP asked to start an investigation on AK Trolls as the group is extensively employed to silence individuals through character assassination, insults, and threats. AK Trolls also use images to incite emotional responses from the target population.

AK Trolls use fake Twitter trends as a means to launch campaigns against opposition. A study by Swiss Federal Institute of Technology in Lausanne (EPFL) found that at least 47% of Twitter trends in Turkey were fake, created automatically using fake and compromised accounts. It is reported that in 2019, there were 6500 fake trends. Of those, 802 were about politics and 472 were pro-AKP, including campaigns against Istanbul mayor Ekrem İmamoğlu such as #ÇünküÇaldılar, which claimed that he stole the votes.

== See also ==
- 50 Cent Army
- Internet Water Army
- Public opinion brigades
- Netto-uyoku
- 1450 Internet army
- State-sponsored Internet propaganda
- Trolls from Olgino
- Russian web brigades
