= Public opinion brigades =

Communist Party of Vietnam groups

The public opinion brigades (Vietnamese: dư luận viên, or tuyên truyền viên) is a state-sponsored web brigade of the Communist Party of Vietnam or linked to the Communist Government of Vietnam.

Similar to Russia's web brigades and China's 50 Cent Army, participants report that they are organized into teams and groups of commentators that participate in Vietnamese and international political blogs and Internet forums using sockpuppets and large-scale orchestrated trolling and disinformation campaigns to promote pro-Vietnamese communist propaganda with a usual overtone of opposition to diversity, equity and inclusion, and of support for Russian imperialism, due to Vietnam's friendly relationship with Russia.

== Background ==
It is unclear how the brigades started since the Communist Party of Vietnam (CPVN/VCP) often controls political information. However, the earliest form of Internet propaganda supporting CPVN seems to have begun in 2007, when the Government announced to "eliminate any wrong news that threaten the Party's rule". As the Communist Party is the only party allowed by Vietnamese constitution, it was the beginning of the brigades. In 2017, Lieutenant-General Nguyen Trong Nghia, deputy head of the Vietnamese military's political department, confirmed that Vietnam has a new, 10,000-strong military cyber warfare unit to counter criticisms of the government on the Internet. The cyber unit named Force 47 is active in several sectors.

== Force 47 ==
Force 47 (Lực lượng 47) is a large cyberspace military unit of Vietnam revealed in December 2017 with a focus on combating "wrong views" on the Internet. Internet security firms such as Volexity and FireEye report pro-Hanoi or Hanoi regime-sponsored hackers installed spyware on anti-government, dissident websites to track who visits them.

== Methods ==
The methods used are not always clear, but includes criticism of opposing views to those of the Communist Party. Vietnamese nationalists, dissidents and anti-communists claim that the CPVN has been doing this for a long time, to brainwash people's minds and distort and truth, branding who disagree with the Communist Party as "traitors of the nation".

BBC and Deutsche Welle correspondents have also reported about the brigades' activities. Other Governments also accused Vietnamese Communist Party's troll army for attacking and hacking websites that criticize the CPVN.

=== Distortion of history ===
The CPVN has attempted to rewrite history, including war crimes by North Vietnam and the Viet Cong during the Vietnam War having been completely erased to serve the Party's agenda, promoting only themselves as the "heroes" of Vietnam.

== See also ==
- Astroturfing
- Black propaganda
- Cyberwarfare in Russia
- Fake news website
- Hasbara
- Information warfare
- Internet activism
- Internet police
- PLA Unit 61398, Chinese PLA online hacking & malware implantation unit
- State-sponsored Internet propaganda in other countries:
  - Internet Water Army; 50 Cent Party; 50 Cent Army, Chinese communist government's version of Dư luận viên
  - Operation Earnest Voice, Jewish Internet Defense Force, and AK Trolls — the former Western Bloc's versions of Dư luận viên
  - Trolls from Olgino
  - Web brigades
- Information security
- Netto-uyoku
- Vatnik (slang)
