= State-sponsored influencer =

Propaganda technique

A state-sponsored influencer or government influencer is a social media influencer who is paid or sponsored by a national government. In some cases, influencers are enlisted by governments or state media outlets to produce content targeting foreigners, often for public diplomacy or political propaganda purposes. In others, influencers are contracted to disseminate public interest communications such as public health policies or financial education.

== China ==
China has commonly used state-sponsored influencers to spread government narratives on social media such as TikTok, YouTube, Instagram and Facebook. Influencers commonly promote Chinese government talking points about international affairs and human rights abuses, and highlight positive aspects of Chinese culture or lifestyle.

=== State media ===
Many reporters of Chinese state media such as China Global Television Network (CGTN), China Radio International (CRI) or Xinhua News Agency run social media accounts presenting as influencers or bloggers without disclosing their affiliation. Influencers recruited by state media typically either have a background in journalism or are graduates from Chinese foreign language schools. A 2023 report by Microsoft found over 230 state media employees or affiliates acting as influencers on Western social media platforms, producing content in 30 languages. The combined following of state-affiliated influencers reached 103 million. Some of these accounts have been labeled as state-controlled media on Facebook.

According to the Wilson Center, China Media Group, which comprises CGTN and CRI, first attempted to position its reporters as influencers in 2020, testing the concept in Africa and Southeast Asia before expanding to other parts of the world. State media influencers are typically bilingual and often begin their social media presence by posting entertainment content about everyday life and cultural topics, then move to more political content once better established. Often, influencers are women and post photos and videos of China which promote it as an idyllic travel destination.

=== Use of ethnic minorities ===
Ethnic minority influencers from regions such as Xinjiang, Tibet and Inner Mongolia have been used by the Chinese government to whitewash human rights abuses taking place there. The Australian Strategic Policy Institute described them as "frontier influencers". Such influencers, often young and female, are carefully politically vetted. Their content is overseen by special agencies called multi-channel networks (MCNs), which allows them to post on Western platforms like YouTube that are blocked in China.

=== Use of foreigners ===
China has paid or sponsored influencers from foreign nations to travel to the country and produce positive content about it. Influencers are allowed to visit areas of China where authorities typically do not allow foreign journalists, and many have lived in China for years. Their content has been promoted by Chinese diplomats and representatives, including at news conferences. According to the Global Taiwan Institute, China has attempted to recruit Taiwanese influencers and celebrities as part of this effort.

In 2021, CGTN launched a competition for English speakers where the winners would get jobs as influencers. In 2025, state media outlet China Youth Daily offered five influencers with over 300,000 followers a free trip to China.

== Israel ==
In 2025, it was reported that Israel was paying influencers in the United States as part of the so-called Esther Project.

== Russia ==
=== State media ===
In March 2025, the Organized Crime and Corruption Reporting Project found that state media outlet RT was covertly paying influencers to spread pro-Russian content online. Influencers have commonly shared Russian government talking points on the Russo-Ukrainian war and promoted the idea of Westerners moving to Russia in pursuit of traditional values. One such influencer, Alexandra Jost (known as "Sasha Meets Russia") was sanctioned by the European Union in June 2026. In 2025, Czech investigative outlet Investigace.cz identified an influencer targeting Czech viewers who was on the payroll of Rossiya Segodnya, another Russian state media group.

=== Use of foreigners ===
In September 2024, the United States indicted two Russia Today employees for allegedly funneling $10 million into Tenet Media, a company employing American and Canadian right-wing influencers. Prosecutors stated the influencers themselves were not aware of the scheme.

According to the Africa Center for Strategic Studies in 2024, Russia has paid influencers in Africa as part of disinformation campaigns.

== United States ==
In August 2026, The Washington Post reported that the United States Department of Defense had hired conservative military veterans with large social media followings as influencers.

== See also ==
- State-sponsored Internet propaganda
- Foreign information manipulation and interference
