= 2024 Tsai A-Ga employee embezzlement scandal =

- Date: June 6, 2024
- Also known as: Tsai A-Ga former employee betrayal scandal
- Type: Embezzlement, breach of trust, and fraud
- Participants: Formosa Transnational Attorneys at Law
- Property damage: Approximately NT$30 million
- Accused: Lin Pei-chen (nickname: Laura)

The 2024 Tsai A-Ga employee embezzlement scandal refers to a series of illegal acts allegedly committed by a senior employee of Taiwanese YouTuber Tsai A-Ga's studio in 2024. The employee was accused of using "AB contracts" to embezzle company income, exploiting the company's name for personal gain, bullying coworkers, and engaging in other misconduct, causing severe losses to the company. The employee was ultimately dismissed, and multiple legal actions followed. After being exposed by the media, the incident quickly attracted widespread public attention and sparked discussions regarding workplace ethics, influencer industry management, and corporate governance.

== Development ==
=== 2023 ===
10 April,Tsai A-Ga uploaded a video to his YouTube channel Tsai A-Ga Life, showing multiple luxury Hermès handbags stored under senior employee Laura's bed. The total value of the collection was estimated to be several million New Taiwan dollars. The video drew attention from some netizens and media outlets, with discussions focusing on the items shown and her lifestyle.

=== 2024 ===
6 June,Tsai A-Ga's studio, through Formosa Transnational Attorneys at Law, issued a statement announcing the dismissal of senior employee Lin Pei-chen (nicknamed "Laura") due to illegal acts that had caused serious losses to the company. The statement emphasized that Laura no longer had any affiliation with the company and was prohibited from conducting activities in its name. It further stated that neither Tsai A-Ga nor the company's staff had prior knowledge of her actions and that legal procedures had been entrusted to attorneys.

Because Formosa Transnational Attorneys at Law is known for handling major cases and charging relatively high fees, and has represented numerous celebrities and prominent business figures, some netizens speculated that the alleged misconduct must have been serious. Industry insiders also remarked that Laura had displayed poor work ethics and professionalism in the past and often clashed with business partners, making her dismissal unsurprising.

4 July,After a month spent contacting clients, restructuring internal procedures, and handling legal matters, Tsai A-Ga, his wife, and videographer Tsai Tsung-han released a video explaining the incident.

The video revealed that Laura had used AB contracts to embezzle more than 10 million New Taiwan dollars in company revenue, affecting over 20 business partners. It was also disclosed that she had, without authorization, used Tsai A-Ga's name to request large quantities of complimentary products from companies for personal use, including household appliances and expensive cosmetic procedures.

Laura was further accused of slandering her employer and colleagues while elevating her own status and insisting that clients could cooperate only through her. Tsai A-Ga stated that her annual salary alone exceeded NT$2 million, excluding benefits, and that she had enjoyed privileges such as a private office, flexible working hours, and the ability to work remotely, denying that poor treatment had motivated her actions. Despite this, Laura reportedly showed no remorse, offered no apology, and simply exited the company's group chats.

5 July,Tsai A-Ga's fan page announced the rehiring of former employee Chou Ying-chien (nicknamed "Ye Nen"), who returned to fill the vacancy left by Laura's dismissal.

Members of Big Buddha Entertainment Co., Ltd., including Tsai A-Ga, subsequently avoided referring to Laura by her real name in videos and instead described her simply as "the former employee."

18 July,Following his return, Ye Nen stated on a podcast that Laura had frequently excluded and bullied him in the workplace while maintaining a friendly image in front of Tsai A-Ga and his wife. He said that he had originally resigned because he could no longer tolerate her behavior.

November,Citing a notarized document signed by Laura acknowledging her illegal gains and debts, which she had repeatedly refused to repay, Tsai A-Ga applied to the New Taipei District Courtto seize her assets. The court approved both the asset preservation request and subsequent distraint compulsory enforcement.

30 December,Tsai A-Ga appointed one of his employees to represent the company as a creditor. Accompanied by a judicial officer from the New Taipei District Courtand police officers from the Luzhou Precinct of the New Taipei City Police Department, they carried out compulsory enforcement at Laura's rented residence in Luzhou District, New Taipei City.

During the operation, police unexpectedly discovered cartridges containing the Schedule II controlled substance etomidate, commonly known as "zombie vape cartridges". Laura and a man surnamed Kuo, who was allegedly consuming drugs at the scene, were arrested and transferred to the New Taipei District Prosecutors Officefor investigation under the Narcotics Hazard Prevention Act.

31 December,Laura posted an apology on her personal Instagram account. However, she also accused Tsai A-Ga's company of large-scale tax evasion, profiting through unethical means, and selling products with unclear sources of ingredients. She further alleged that Tsai A-Ga had used his influence as an internet celebrity to cultivate an internet water army, rally online supporters, and manipulate public opinion.

In response, Tsai A-Ga issued an official statement through his lawyers, denying all allegations and announcing that legal action would be pursued. His wife, Lee Pei-chieh, also expressed shock and described Laura's actions as "distressing".

Subsequently, Tsai A-Ga released a video titled "Complete Record of Debt Collection" on his YouTube channel, providing additional details about the case. In the video, Tsai A-Ga and his team accused Laura of committing fraud through the use of AB contracts involving over NT$10 million.

The video further showed that Laura's residence had been registered as a shared workspace and revealed clues connected to the alleged fraud. A narration in the video stating, "The landlord knew about the situation and still let her stay—he really isn't a saint," sparked widespread discussion among netizens. Internet users later discovered that the landlord of the shared workspace was YouTuber Saint (Sheng Chieh-shih), whose company was named Not a Saint Co., Ltd. ("不是圣人股份有限公司").

=== 2025 ===
January 2, Saint (Sheng Chieh-shih)issued a statement on social media providing further clarification after becoming implicated in Laura's fraud case. He acknowledged that Laura had used a shared workspace managed by his company, Not a Saint Co., Ltd., and explained that the arrangement stemmed from an investment agreement signed on 18 May 2024. Under the agreement, Laura, as one of the investors, was entitled to use the shared workspace for two years and was prohibited from withdrawing her investment.

Saint emphasized that Article 154, Paragraph 1 of the Code of Criminal Procedure establishes the principle of the presumption of innocence, arguing that there were no grounds to forcibly terminate Laura's right to use the space unless she was convicted by a court. He added that if she were found guilty, he would not protect her and would evict her from the premises.

In addition, Saint revealed that, before the scandal was exposed, Laura had used the shared workspace for office work, meetings, and private gatherings. Responding to accusations that he had sheltered Laura, Saint insisted that he had no knowledge of her specific actions. He stated that, before Laura admitted to her misconduct on Instagram on 31 December, he had no reason to interfere with her use of the premises.

January 6, Tsai A-Ga uploaded a video to his channel refuting the allegations made by Laura in her apology statement, describing them as entirely unfounded. He also urged Laura to face the judicial process honestly, fulfill her responsibilities, and refrain from using smear tactics to mislead the public.

January 7, Tsai A-Ga adapted the popular song "Paramela" (帕拉梅拉) by rewriting its lyrics to create a parody entitled Pay Back the Money, Laura (还钱萝拉). The song mocked Laura over her unpaid debts and alleged drug use, and a video of Tsai performing the song was uploaded to his YouTube channel.

March 11, Tsai A-Ga uploaded a video to his channel detailing the second compulsory enforcement action against Laura. The video showed that Tsai A-Ga and his wife had returned to Laura's residence with additional personnel on 30 December 2024 and, anticipating that she might refuse to answer the door, had specifically brought a locksmith. Upon entering the residence, they discovered that the bathroom in Laura's room was locked, while sounds of a cat could be heard inside, confirming that Laura was hiding there. After a period of standoff, Laura eventually opened the door and claimed that she had contracted influenza A and needed to remain in isolation, attempting to avoid the debt collection process.

In the video, Tsai A-Ga stated that valuable items, including electrical appliances, luxury goods, and expensive liquor, were removed from Laura's room as collateral for her debts. During the process, however, police conducted a search and discovered an electronic cigarette and cartridges containing the Schedule II controlled substance etomidate, commonly known as "zombie vape cartridges", inside Laura's bedside cabinet. The video showed that Laura initially denied ownership but later stated, "If someone has to admit it, then I will admit it, but these things are not mine." The statement attracted public attention. Police tested the cartridges on-site, confirmed the presence of narcotic substances, and expanded their investigation.

In addition, Tsai A-Ga disclosed in the video that, as of 13 January 2025, Laura had repaid only approximately NT$800,000 through court-ordered enforcement and asset seizure procedures. Around NT$400,000 had come from the seizure of stocks, while another NT$300,000 had been paid on her behalf by a friend through the court rather than voluntarily by Laura herself. Compared with the NT$30 million she was alleged to have obtained through the use of AB contracts, the amount repaid remained far below the total. At the end of the video, Tsai A-Ga stated that he had obtained information indicating that Laura had attempted to smear him and emphasized that he would continue pursuing repayment through legal means.

He further revealed that Laura had attempted to delay the debt collection process and had called for "reinforcements" by telephone. One woman identified herself as a relative of the property owner, while a man claimed that the owner was his niece. Subsequent media reports revealed that the property was registered under a company owned by YouTuber Saint (Sheng Chieh-shih), indirectly confirming that the "reinforcements" were in fact Saint's in-laws, including his mother-in-law and his wife's uncle.

In response, Saint issued a statement on social media emphasizing that neither he nor his company had any connection with Laura or these relatives. He thanked Tsai A-Ga for "doing him a big favor" by exposing the problems associated with these individuals. He further stated that those relatives had previously been involved in multiple controversies and that he had unsuccessfully attempted to dissuade them, even considering filing lawsuits against them. He also warned the public to remain vigilant and to report directly to the police if anyone attempted to borrow money or conduct cryptocurrency-related activities in his name.
