= Troll farm =

People employed to post divisive content

A troll farm or troll factory is an institutionalised group of internet trolls that seeks to interfere in political opinions and decision-making. A troll farm may use sockpuppetry, bots or coordinated fake accounts to create the appearance of independent public opinion.

A 2017 report from Freedom House showed that 30 governments worldwide (out of 65 covered by the study) paid keyboard armies to spread propaganda and attack critics. According to the report, these governments use paid writers and bots to harass journalists and erode trust in the media. Attempts were made to influence elections in 18 of the countries covered by the study.

== Governments ==
=== Iran ===
In 2018, a group of Reddit moderators uncovered a network of Iranian-affiliated websites and user accounts spreading pro‑Iran and anti‑Western narratives. Also in 2018, Twitter released over 10 million tweets from 4,570 accounts linked to Russian and Iranian state-backed troll operations to help researchers study how these actors used the platform to influence public opinion, including during the U.S. presidential election and the Brexit referendum. In 2024, a report by the Microsoft Threat Analysis Center showed that the Iranian government had launched cyberattacks promoting AI‑supported fake news sites aimed at polarizing swing‑state voters.

=== Brazil ===
It has been widely suspected that Brazil's former president Jair Bolsonaro and his family created troll farms to promote support for his government policies and to attack and harass rivals through the Internet. These fake accounts and bots are possibly controlled by an office inside one of Bolsonaro's government buildings led by his son Carlos known as 'office of hate', which is suspected to have created more than 1000 fake accounts to support Bolsonaro's government.

Troll accounts have also been linked to misinformation related to the COVID-19 pandemic in Brazil, as Bolsonaro's government is known for having adopted a denialist posture regarding the pandemic.

=== China ===
The "50 Cent Party" consists of paid Chinese bureaucrats who cheerlead for the Chinese Communist Party (CCP) or try to change the subject during online discussions.

=== India ===
India's ruling party BJP has a large number of online supporters who support its agenda and attack political rivals. Their methods were recorded by investigative journalist Swati Chaturvedi, who described them as a "digital army" in her book on the subject, I Am a Troll: Inside the Secret World of the BJP's Digital Army.

=== Malaysia ===
In 2022, Meta Platforms announced that it has removed hundreds of Facebook and Instagram accounts that were directly linked with the Royal Malaysia Police (RMP), as they were used as part of a troll farm to disseminate propaganda and manipulate public discourse about the Malaysian police and the government. Meta added that such actions were against its policy of "coordinated inauthentic behaviour".

=== Nicaragua ===
In November 2021, Facebook reported that it closed accounts, groups and pages in Facebook and Instagram linked to a troll farm operated by the Sandinista National Liberation Front, the ruling party in Nicaragua.

=== Philippines ===
The Philippines has been called "patient zero in the global disinformation epidemic." Studies into the country's troll farms found that political campaigns pay trolls $1,000 to $2,000 per month to create multiple fake social media accounts to post political propaganda and attack critics. A 2017 study found that the political campaign of President Rodrigo Duterte had spent $200,000 to hire online trolls. Duterte admitted to hiring trolls for his campaign.

Since then, trolling behaviour supportive of Duterte has been traced back to taxpayer-funded government institutions.

=== Russia ===
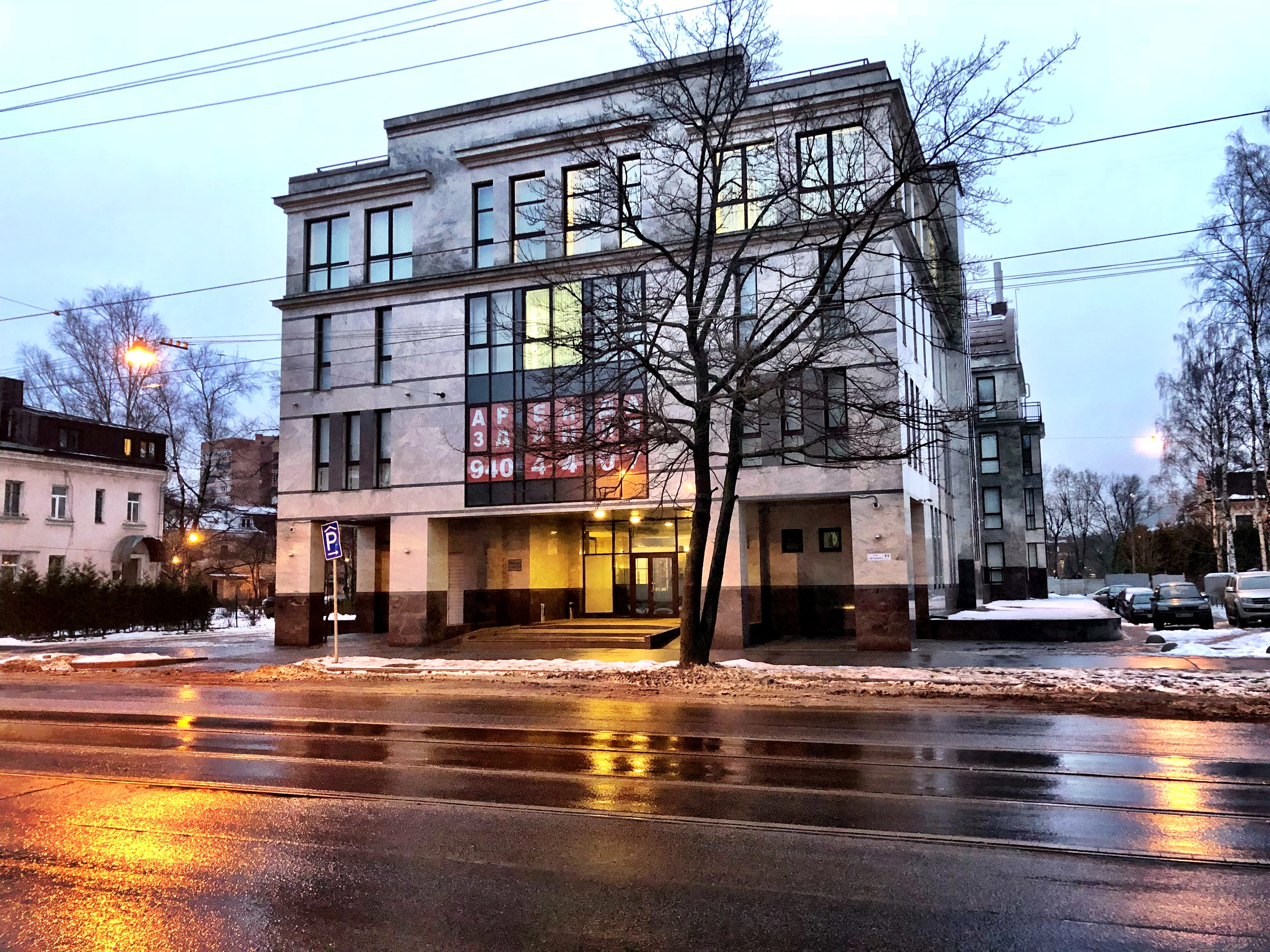
The former Internet Research Agency building, dubbed the Russian troll factory, in Savushkina Street in St. Petersburg, Russia.

The Russian web brigades, including Internet Research Agency, became known in the late 2010s for the Russian interference in the 2016 United States elections. The Internet Research Agency has employed troll armies to spread propaganda, command Twitter trends, and sow fear and erode trust in American political and media institutions.

=== Turkey ===
The ruling Justice and Development Party of Turkey has a troll farm commonly known as AK Trolls.

=== Ukraine ===
Ukrainian oligarchs and politicians actively use "troll factories" for their business and political purposes. Journalists from Radio Liberty note that the services of trolls, among others, were used by such oligarchs as Rinat Akhmetov and Ihor Kolomoyskyi. In the fall of 2019, two large-scale journalistic investigations about “troll factories” in Ukraine were published.

== Non government entities ==
=== Facebook ===
In 2020, during the COVID-19 pandemic, Facebook found that troll farms from North Macedonia and the Philippines pushed coronavirus disinformation. The publisher, which used content from these farms, was banned.

In the run-up to the 2020 United States elections, Eastern European troll farms operated popular Facebook pages showing content related to Christians and Blacks in America. They included more than 15,000 pages combined and were viewed by 140 million US users per month. This was in part due to how Facebook's algorithm and policies allow unoriginal viral content to be copied and spread in ways that still drive up user engagement. As of September 2021, some of the most popular pages were still active on Facebook despite the company's efforts to take down such content.

=== Harassment of Jessikka Aro ===
Finnish investigative journalist Jessikka Aro interviewed workers at a “troll factory” in Saint Petersburg. Aro was harassed online after she published her story. A court in Helsinki convicted three persons who had harassed Aro on charges of defamation and negligence. Aro has stated that online trolls can negatively affect freedom of speech and democracy.

=== Pro-Trump misinformation ===
In the Macedonian city of Veles, locals launched at least 140 United States political websites supporting Donald Trump.

=== Turning Point USA ===
During the 2020 United States presidential election and the COVID-19 pandemic, Turning Point USA and its affiliate Turning Point Action were described as troll farms for paying young conservatives in Phoenix, Arizona, some of them minors with parental support, to post misinformation about the integrity of the electoral process and the threat of COVID-19. The payout included bonuses for posts that generated greater engagement. They used their own social media accounts or fake accounts without disclosing their relationship with Turning Point and were instructed by Turning Point to slightly alter and repost the modified messages a limited number of times to avoid automatic detection.

== See also ==
- Demoralization (warfare) – Warfare tactic used to erode morale
- Disinformation – Deliberately misleading information
- Fake news website – Website that deliberately publishes hoaxes and disinformation
- Firehose of falsehood – Propaganda technique
- Fraud factory
- State-sponsored Internet propaganda
