= State-sponsored Internet propaganda =

Employment of internet propaganda by a government

Internet manipulation and propaganda has been sponsored by sovereign states to influence elections, sow distrust in institutions, and spread rumors and disinformation, typically using bots, troll farms, or influencers to create and spread content, particularly via social media. Propaganda is used internally to control populations, and externally to influence other societies. The term foreign information manipulation and interference (FIMI) is also used, particularly by the European Union, for state-sponsored Internet propaganda.

== Africa ==
- Egypt: Since taking power in 2014, Abdel Fattah el-Sisi has been accused of hacking to promote support for his regime.

== Americas ==
- Mexico: According to researchers quoted by the BBC, the Mexican government and multiple competing political parties have used bots. According to a 2017 paper, government-sponsored "spam-bots" have been used to "target journalists" and "spread misinformation".
- United States:
  - ZunZuneo (2010–2012) – Attempt to establish a microblogging service controlled by the United States Agency for International Development to undermine the Cuban government
  - Operation Earnest Voice – Sock puppet campaign, officially started in 2011
  - During the first presidency of Donald Trump, the CIA allegedly used social media accounts with fake identities to spread rumors about the Chinese government, according to an investigation by Reuters.
  - #ChinaAngVirus disinformation campaign
- Venezuela: The Bolivarian Army of Trolls, founded in 2017, is tasked with disseminating Bolivarian propaganda and spreading disinformation. According to a document from Venezuela's Ministry of the Interior and Justice leaked in 2017, the Bolivarian Army of Trolls has five squads: pro-government, opponents, neutrals, distraction, and fake news.

== Asia-Pacific ==
- Islamic Republic of Afghanistan: The former government of Afghanistan used a state-sponsored Internet troll army to push their narrative and exaggerate Afghan Taliban casualties. Sometimes, the information posted by the army was picked up by uncritical sections of Afghanistan's media and reported without any additional confirmation.
- Bahrain: Since the Arab Spring and subsequent uprising, the Government of Bahrain has increased its political and media censorship, as well as launching propaganda disinformation. In 2019, Bahrain was listed as one of 70 countries with widespread Internet propaganda misinformation and hiring cyber hackers to censor bad news about Bahraini government. From 2017, when conflict with Qatar emerged, Bahrain also participated on an Internet propaganda campaign against Qatar and trying to spread sectarian conflicts.
- China: The 50 Cent Party and Internet Water Army are terms used to describe different types of state-sponsored pro-Chinese Communist Party (CCP) Internet propaganda and disinformation operations. According to an article by the South China Morning Post, supporters of the 2019–20 Hong Kong protests remarked on the number of "50 cent trolls", but Fang Kecheng, a professor at the Chinese University of Hong Kong who has researched Chinese internet nationalism, stated that "the CCP is also acutely aware that radical nationalists may go out of control and cause trouble. So the endorsement is specific to several organs rather than an overall strategy." In June 2020, Twitter deleted over 170,000 accounts allegedly linked to a Chinese government disinformation campaign that targeted Hong Kong and sought to discredit the United States. In December 2021, Twitter removed accounts linked to the Chinese government that aimed to deny human rights abuses of Uyghurs in Xinjiang. In 2022, Chinese public relations firm Shanghai Haixun Technology Co. began planting pro-Beijing stories in almost three dozen news outlets in an effort to help the Chinese government improve its image. In September 2022, Meta Platforms said it disrupted the first known China-based influence operation aimed at targeting U.S. users with political content ahead of the U.S. November midterm elections. In May 2023, Meta Platforms detailed new tactics by the Chinese government in its online disinformation efforts including the creation of a front media company in the West, hiring freelance writers around the world, offering to recruit protesters, and co-opting an NGO. Disinformation networks known as Spamouflage or "Dragonbridge" have been linked to China's Ministry of Public Security and used to attempt to influence U.S. elections. In April 2024, Microsoft Threat Analysis Center observed that deceptive CCP-affiliated social media accounts have started to pose contentious questions on controversial U.S. domestic issues to collect information on key voting demographics before the November 2024 U.S. presidential election. On 26 April 2026, Tibetans in 27 countries voted for their Parliament-in-Exile, despite a China-linked online campaign trying to undermine the election. Researchers at the Digital Forensic Research Lab (DFRLab) said the Spamouflage network, tied to Beijing, spread fake posts attacking the re-elected Sikyong Penpa Tsering and questioning the vote's legitimacy. Most of the effort failed, showing China's ongoing attempts to influence and control how Tibetan politics are seen abroad.
- India: Sponsored trolls are reported to include BJP IT Cell. The Bharatiya Janata Party (BJP) has allegedly used troll disinformation to repress and monitor government opponents. In 2019, a European watchdog discovered 265 bogus media outlets in 65 countries which are managed by an "Indian influence network". The network of fake news websites were said to be used to target policy makers in the United States and the European Union to act against Pakistan. The aim of those websites is to spread propaganda and influence public perception on Pakistan. Now defunct, the Tek Fog was a software application operable via a mobile phone. Indian news portal The Wire stated that it was used by the BJP to infiltrate social media platforms in order to promote favourable viewpoints and target perceived opponents. However, it turned out to be a social media disinformation hoax against the BJP.The Wire issued a formal apology to its readers and took down the Meta and Tek Fog reports. The Washington Post and the Byline Times also reported that a lieutenant colonel of India's foreign intelligence agency, the Research and Analysis Wing, established a fake news site called the "Disinfo Lab" to spread disinformation against critics of the Modi government.
- Indonesia: Indonesia has engaged by using state-sponsored troll army to spread propaganda against independence movement of West Papua and accused of promoting pro-incumbent campaign in 2019 Indonesian presidential election. At the other hand, Indonesian president Joko Widodo has accused his opposition group for using propaganda, especially from Russia, to spread hoaxes against his administration.
- Iran: Islamic Republic's troll army are known supporters of Supreme Leader Ayatollah Ali Khameini and the current government of Iran, while criticizing any opposition. In April 2019, the Oxford Internet Institute Computational Propaganda Project published a study on an Iranian-related campaign on Twitter targeting Arab users. The Computational Propaganda team found that this Iranian-related campaign on Twitter focused on masquerading as Arabic news outlets to gain the trust of Arab Twitter users.
- Iraq: Due to the sectarian nature of the country, Iraqi Internet propaganda is also ranged between different groups. During the rise of Islamic State of Iraq and the Levant, the group had managed to operate a systematic propaganda indoctrination on the Internet to confuse Iraqi civilians. According to human rights activist Faisal Al Mutar, Iraqi online propaganda has been in full speed even after the death of Saddam Hussein.
- Israel: Israeli State-sponsored Internet propaganda include the Hasbara, Hasbara Fellowships, Act.IL, and the Jewish Internet Defense Force. Supporters generally frame this "hasbara" as part of its fight towards improving their image abroad, and also against anti-Israeli agitation and attempts to criticize it. There is substantive evidence that Israel heavily uses data-driven strategies, trolling and disinformation and manipulated media, as well as dedicating funds to state-sponsored media, for overt propaganda campaigns.
- Japan: Between 2019 and 2021, an anonymous Twitter account Dappi (@dappi2019) posted a number of tweets praising the ruling Liberal Democratic Party (LDP) and conservative opposition parties, while attacking left-wing opposition parties and news outlets critical of the LDP through false claims and defamation. Dappi's aim was to sway public opinion against the opposition parties. The tweets were primarily posted during regular office hours, and rarely on weekends, leading to speculation that coordinated efforts were behind the account. In 2021, the individual behind Dappi was identified through a legal request filed by two members of the Constitutional Democratic Party of Japan (CDP) in the House of Councillors, who sought compensation for the damages caused by the tweets. The individual was revealed to be an employee of the IT company called Ones Quest (ワンズクエスト), which had business dealings with the LDP.
- Jordan: Recent widespread protests in regard to the Arab Spring have led to increasing propaganda and Internet censorship in Jordan, laws have been passed threatening freedom of speech. Internet operation by the state propaganda also seeks to weaken the independent voices of journalists in the country. By 2019, freedom of media in Jordan has declined with regard to growing Internet propaganda by the government.
- Kazakhstan: The government of Nursultan Nazarbayev had historically sponsored a group of internet trolls called "Nurbots" to spread disinformation and divert attention from inner issues. Nazarbayev's successor, Kassym-Jomart Tokayev, has largely continued its legacy of stifling dissent using internet propaganda while masquerading under the mask of democratisation and reforms.
- Malaysia:

1. The federal government has begun a systematic campaign online to defame Shiites in accordance with the recent ban of practicing Shi’a Islam in country since the 2010s.
2. The "Onion Army" (Malay: Tentera Bawang) also appeared at certain pro-Israeli Facebook pages to defend Malaysian government's action of barring Israeli participants during the 2019 World Para Swimming Championships.
3. The Special Affairs Department (Malay: Jabatan Komunikasi Komuniti, "Community Communications Department"; often abbreviated as "J-KOM") is a government agency that has been used as a propaganda machine for the Barisan Nasional (BN) / United Malays National Organisation (UMNO) administration to attack opposition parties and political rivals. The agency has been attributed to engage in state-sponsored anonymous political commentators and trolls by spreading pro-government propaganda on the internet, colloquially known as "cybertroopers" in the country.
4. In 2022, Meta Platforms announced that it has removed hundreds of Facebook and Instagram accounts that were directly linked with the Royal Malaysia Police (RMP), as they were used as part of a troll farm to disseminate propaganda and manipulate public discourse about the Malaysian police and the government. Meta added that such actions were against its policy of "coordinated inauthentic behaviour".

- Myanmar: The Tatmadaw and the Burmese government has sponsored propaganda through Internet and dismiss its atrocities towards its minorities like the Rohingya, Shan, Kachin and Karen people.
- North Korea: the troll army of North Korea is known to be supportive of the Kim dynasty's rule, anti-South Korean, and anti-American. They first appeared in 2013. Reportedly, North Korea has 200 agents that post propaganda messages on South Korean portals under assumed identities stolen from South Koreans, with 27,000 posts in 2011 and over 41,000 posts in 2012.
- Pakistan: The Pakistan Armed Forces have used propaganda to influence the government, to bolster the military's image, and to protect the power of the military's authority in the country by labelling the critics as "anti-state". In 2019, Meta discovered and removed a network of 103 pages, groups and accounts linked to employees of the Inter-Service Public Relations of the Pakistani military "for engaging in coordinated inauthentic behavior on Facebook and Instagram."
- Philippines: Oxford University released a study stating that hired "keyboard trolls" played a role in President Rodrigo Duterte's 2016 electoral campaign. The study said the Duterte campaign team spent at least $200 thousand and hired 400 to 500 people to defend Duterte from online critics. It added the hired "trolls" remained to support Duterte and his administration after he was elected, and allegedly used to silence critics with threats of violence and rape. Duterte, while admitting to paying online supporters during the elections, also insisted he has followers such Mocha Uson (owner of Mocha Uson Blog) who offered services for free.
- Qatar: Qatari propaganda has previously been in line with Saudi and Emirati until the 2017–19 Qatar diplomatic crisis, with Al Jazeera being a notable evidence of Qatari propaganda spreading in promotion of violence, its anti-American view and nurturing Islamist movements. Since 2017, Al Arabiya, a Saudi-based channel, accused Qatari Government for ongoing media onslaught by sponsoring massive propaganda networks in Politico to defame the Saudis and raise support for Qatar. According to an investigation by The Bureau of Investigative Journalism, Qatar was one of the clients of Portland Communications, a company involved in "wikilaundering" - editing Wikipedia article to make them more favourable towards their clients. The changes included burying references to the reporting related to the 2022 FIFA World Cup and obscuring mentions of Qatari businessmen involved in financing terrorism.
- Saudi Arabia:

1. King's Brigade, known to be supportive for the Saud family and the monarchy. Its mission is to denounce any criticisms against the Saud family, and praising Shari‘a Law as well as lethal actions by the government. Recently, it has targeted Palestinians and other opposing the Saudi influence like Qatar.
2. In December 2019, Twitter removed 5,929 accounts for violating their manipulation policies. The company investigated and attributed these accounts to a single state-run information operation, which originated in Saudi Arabia.

- Singapore:

1. Ruling party People's Action Party and its youth wing Young PAP have been officially reported to have organized teams to work both publicly and anonymously to counter criticism of party and government in cyberspace since 1995. As reported by The Straits Times, as of 2007, the group consists of two teams, led by members of parliament of People's Action Party, where one team strategises the campaign the other team executes the strategies.
2. The Info-communications Media Development Authority (IMDA) frequently engages advertising agencies to promote civic campaigns and national day celebrations on traditional media, video-sharing websites and social media. Some of these nation-building efforts are seen as selective in choosing the historical narratives, often only focusing the achievements of the ruling party.

- Syria: Owing to its long history of censorship, Syria has some of the most extensive state-sponsored propaganda. Since the Syrian Civil War began, President Bashar al-Assad has frequently allowed pro-regime sockpuppets to disinform about the conflict in favor for his regime. The White Helmets, a humanitarian organization rescuing Syrian civilians from conflict zones, is a major target of the Syrian government's disinformation campaign.
- Thailand: The Royal Thai Army have been coordinating with the Russian government to sow Anti-Americanism, support the government of Prayuth Chan-o-cha, and discredit Thailand's democratic movements since 2010.
- Turkey: 6,000 paid social media commentators known as "AK Trolls" mainly spreading pro-Erdoğan propaganda and attack those opposing him (2016). In June 2020, Twitter removed 7,340 accounts engaging in "coordinated inauthentic activity" targeted at Turkish citizens; the removal prompted Erdoğan's administration to appear to threaten Twitter with government restrictions.
- United Arab Emirates: During the 2017–19 Qatar diplomatic crisis, the Emirati government openly allowed and funded the troll propaganda army to dismiss Qatari rejection and spread anti-Qatari propaganda.
- Uzbekistan: In order to control its population, the Uzbek government established its own social network to spread Internet censorship and propaganda. Even with the death of Islam Karimov, Tashkent remains firm to ongoing political censorship on social media.
- Vietnam:

1. Public opinion brigades. As of 2017, the military currently employs at least 10,000 members in a special force, named Force 47, to counter criticisms of the government in cyberspace and hacking into dissident anti-government websites and installing spyware to track visitors.
2. In December 2019, Facebook removed 900 accounts, groups, and pages on its own platform and Instagram, due to inauthentic behavior and spreading political agenda. These accounts reportedly belonged to two separate groups in Georgia and Vietnam.

== Europe ==
- Azerbaijan: Multiple sources have documented evidence of coordinated pro-Azerbaijani influence operations on Wikipedia promoting government narratives related to Armenia and Nagorno-Karabakh. These actions are viewed as part of a broader issue of media freedom in Azerbaijan, in which authorities engage in digital propaganda, public relations manipulation, and efforts to suppress or distort Armenian-related content. One investigation cites evidence suggestive of the involvement of state-linked actors. In 2011, Azerbaijan targeted Wikipedia as a potential threat to national security. The Azerbaijani government has hired public relations firms, some of which are documented to have previously rewritten Wikipedia articles.

Activities have included recruiting editors via social media, copying official press releases, and uploading state-sourced media, while certain organized editing campaigns in Azerbaijan have supported these efforts. There have been reports of editorial policy violations related to neutrality, sockpuppetry, the abuse of administrative privileges, and the regulation of key decision-making to private channels, and undisclosed paid editing.

- Belarus: the Lukashenko Government has taken a step to spread disinformation in accordance with his rule and, sometimes, in line with Russian troll propaganda, from blaming Poland and Ukraine for instigating problems to lethal threats against activists. Disinformation became increasingly intensified following the 2020 Belarusian protests, with trolls from Russia and Serbia actively participated to spread disinformation and igniting fears for Belarusian population to turn against the protests.
- Bulgaria: Internet trolls have become a problem in Bulgaria since the 2010s, with troll armies being used by various political parties to attack and threaten each other. Despite attempts to reduce and end the internet trolls since 2014, the issue remains unaddressed and becomes increasingly intensified by 2020 under the corruption of Boyko Borisov's government.
- France: Facebook alleges in December 2020, that accounts linked to the French military have been posing as Africans in French and Arabic language websites catering to the region to promote views in favor of France. The accounts promoted claims of Russian interference in the election in the Central African Republic, expressed supportive views on the French military involvement in the region and criticized Russian military involvement in the region. These accounts also interacted with alleged Russian accounts.
- Poland: Since the ascension of Andrzej Duda to the presidency in the 2010s, media freedom in Poland has suffered significant deterioration, with state-sponsored, conservative-aligned Internet media attacking liberal groups in Poland and criticizing European leaders for their politics, which the Polish state-sponsored media regards as abnormal. In 2019, a troll farm group aligned to the conservative movement close to the Polish government was discovered in Wrocław. In 2020 Polish presidential election, Duda Government was accused of spreading propaganda to manipulate public and to enhance the authoritarian rule. In the 2023 Polish parliamentary elections however, Pis majority government, of which Duda is a member, has been ousted, following an establishment of a new ruling liberal coalition, which partially depoliticised public media.
- Russia:

1. Web brigades first alleged in April 2003
2. CyberBerkut; pro-Russian hacktivist group engaging in attacks against post-2014 Ukraine
3. Internet Research Agency, also known as "Trolls from Olgino". Identified as a "trolling"/astroturfing company operating on numerous sites.
4. Vulkan files leak
5. Pravda network disinformation website campaign has increasingly spread content that serves as training data for large language models in order to influence the output produced by popular chatbots.

- Serbia: Since 2017, the Serbian government has been accused of sponsoring a troll army (known by locals as bots, Serbian: ботови) to silence critics and promote anti-Albanian sentiment with regard to Kosovo. The troll army is believed to be sponsored by President Aleksandar Vučić, who was the Minister of Information and an expert in propaganda during the Yugoslav Wars.
- United Kingdom: "Online Covert Action" and other missions (like the "77th Brigade) by the Joint Threat Research Intelligence Group, revealed by Edward Snowden in February 2014.

== See also ==
- Agent of influence
- Black propaganda
- Front organization
- Online nationalism
- Patriotic hacking
- Shill
- Sock puppet account
- State-sponsored influencer
- Vote brigading
- Troll farm
