= Buzzer (internet) =

Indonesian term referring to paid Internet commentators

Buzzer (Indonesian: buzzer, pendengung) is an Indonesian internet slang word used to refer to a person who works to "buzz" certain messages or perspectives with regards to a certain issue, opinion, or brand, in order to make the opinion appear as common as possible. Buzzers also regularly spread propaganda by using biased language. Scholars have differing opinion on how to regard buzzers in terms of their use of accounts: some argue that buzzers exclusively refer to sockpuppet operators; while others argue that buzzers may use influencer accounts, if not both. Scholars also differ over compensation: some argue that buzzers refer only to those paid by money (then known as buzzeRp); while others argue that buzzers can have non-monetary compensation such as position, social relations, patronage, as well as conviction and commitment to the cause.

== See also ==
- 50 Cent Party
- State-sponsored Internet propaganda
- Fake news
- Troll
- Astroturfing
