= Foreign information manipulation and interference =

Propaganda and disinformation tactic

Foreign information manipulation and interference (FIMI) is the intentional and coordinated manipulative activity by foreign state or state-linked actors aimed at distorting the information environment and undermining trust, democratic processes, or security. The European External Action Service (EEAS) sees it as an ongoing security and foreign policy threat for the European Union and created the East StratCom Task Force to address it.

FIMI is defined by the EEAS as "a mostly non-illegal pattern of behaviour that threatens or has the potential to negatively impact values, procedures and political processes. Such activity is manipulative in character, conducted in an intentional and coordinated manner. Actors of such activity can be state or non-state actors, including their proxies inside and outside of their own territory."

The European Union introduced the term in 2021, notably in the EU–US summit statement in June. It has been increasingly featured alongside with or has outright replaced the term "disinformation" in EEAS communications.

== See also ==
- Cognitive warfare
- Disinformation
- Internet manipulation
- Information warfare
- Foreign electoral intervention
- Political warfare
- State-sponsored Internet propaganda
- Information integrity
