= Beate Roessler =

German-Dutch philosopher

Beate Roessler (born 1958 in Heidelberg) is a German philosopher and researcher who is a Professor of Ethics at the University of Amsterdam.

== Biography ==
Roessler studied philosophy in several German and English cities, among them London, Oxford, and Berlin. Her Ph.D. was completed in 1988 at the Free University of Berlin. Roessler’s habilitation developed a theory of the value of privacy, and was finalized in 2001 at the University of Bremen.

Roessler was the Socrates Professor of the Foundations of Humanism at Leiden University between 2003 and 2010. Roessler has held various shorter-term research and teaching positions; she was a fellow at the Berlin Institute for Advanced Study in 2003 and 2004. Roessler was a visiting scholar at Macquarie University, Sydney, the Law School at the University of Melbourne, and at New York University. In 2023, she will be teaching as a Bok Fellow at the Law School of the University of Pennsylvania.

Beate Roessler is a founding member of the Amsterdam Platform for Privacy Research and Platform for the Ethics and Politics of Technology. Roessler is a co-editor of the European Journal of Philosophy and the Privacy Studies Journal. She is part of the project Political Microtargeting: Safeguarding Public Values and the consortium of the gravitation program Public Values in the Algorithmic Society. Roessler's board memberships also include the editorial board of the book series Essex Studies in Contemporary Critical Theory (Rowman and Littlefield) and the International Advisory Board of the Institute for Social Research, Frankfurt/Germany.

Roessler is a corresponding member of the Göttingen Academy of Sciences and Humanities, a member of the Academia Europaea and of the American Academy of Arts and Sciences.

== Bibliography ==
=== Books ===
- Die Theorie des Verstehens in Sprachanalyse und Hermeneutik, Berlin: Duncker und Humblot 1990
- Der Wert des Privaten, Frankfurt: Suhrkamp, 2001; English translation: The Value of Privacy, Polity Press, 2005
- Autonomie. Ein Versuch über das gelungene Leben, Berlin: Suhrkamp, 2017; Dutch translation: Autonomie. Een essay over het vervulde leven, Boom 2018; English translation: Autonomy: An Essay on the Life Well-Lived, Polity Press, 2021

=== Edited books ===
- Forthcoming: On Being Human in the Digital World, edited with Valerie Steeves (Ottawa), Cambridge University Press, 2024 (with contributions by H. Nissenbaum, F. Pasquale, J. Millar, J. Cohen and others)
- Social Dimensions of Privacy: Interdisciplinary Perspectives, edited with Dorota Mokrosinska, Cambridge: Cambridge University Press, 2015
- Privacies. Philosophical Evaluations, Stanford University Press, 2004
- Autonomy. Problems and Limits (Special Issue of the Philosophical Explorations), Vol V, Nr. 3 October 2002

=== Selected articles ===
- "Online Manipulation. Hidden Influences in a Digital World", co-authored with Daniel Susser and Helen Nissenbaum, in: 4 Georgetown Law Technology Review 1, 2019.
- "Privacy as a Human Right", in: Proceedings of the Aristotelian Society 2017, 2
- "Privacy and/in the Public Sphere", in: Yearbook for Eastern and Western Philosophy, 2016,1, p 40–60, Berlin: De Gruyter, 2016
- "Wie wir uns regieren. Soziale Dimensionen des Privaten in der Post-Snowden Ära", in: WestEnd. Neue Zeitschrift für Sozialforschung, Jg 13, Heft1, 2016. S. 103-119
- "Are Private Data Tradable Goods", in: Social Dimensions of Privacy: Interdisciplinary Perspectives, edited with Dorota Mokrosinska, Cambridge: Cambridge University Press, 2015
- "Autonomy, Self-Knowledge, and Oppression", in: Oshana, M. (ed.), Personal Autonomy and Social Oppression, London: Routledge, 2014
- "Kantian Autonomy and its social Preconditions: On Axel Honneth's Das Recht der Freiheit", in: Krisis. Tijdschrift voor Aktuele Filosofie, 2013, issue 1
- "Privacy and Social Interaction", co-authored with Dorota Mokrosinska, in: Philosophy & Social Criticism October 2013 39: 771-791

=== Selected articles in popular media ===
- “What is there to lose? Privacy in offline and online friendships” Eurozine 2015
- "Desperately seeking Women" Eurozine Febr 2014
