= PTT Bulletin Board System =

Taiwanese bulletin board

PTT
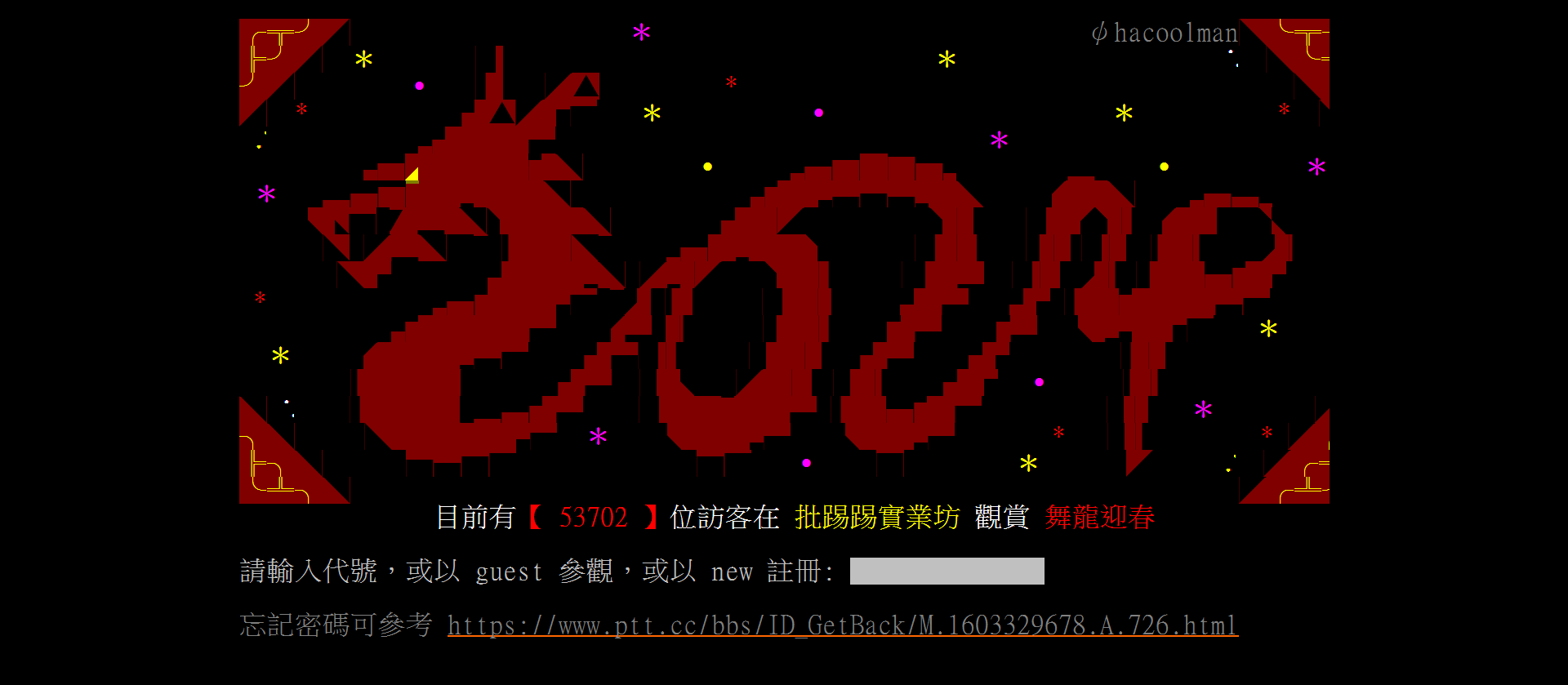
- Login screen
- Website type: Bulletin board system
- Available in: Chinese
- Owners: The BBS Technology Research Club, National Taiwan University
- Creator: Yi-Chin Tu
- Website: www.ptt.cc
- Commercial: No
- Registration: Optional
- Launched: September 14, 1995 (31 years ago)
- Current status: Active

PTT Bulletin Board System (PTT, Chinese: 批踢踢實業坊; pinyin: Pītītī Shíyè Fāng; Pe̍h-ōe-jī: Phi-thek-thek Si̍t-gia̍p-hong) is the largest terminal-based bulletin board system (BBS) based in Taiwan. It was founded by Yi-Chin Tu and other students from the National Taiwan University in 1995 as Professional Technology Temple, and it is currently administered by the Electronic BBS Research Society as a non-commercial and open-source BBS.

PTT has more than 1.5 million registered users, with over 150,000 users online during peak hours. The BBS has over 20,000 boards covering a multitude of topics, and more than 20,000 articles and 500,000 comments are posted every day as of 2014.

== Background ==
Using the TELNET protocol, PTT provides a quick, free of charge, and open online forum community. Currently, PTT has two branch sites, PTT2 (批踢踢兔) and PTT3 (批踢踢參). Of the three sites, the main site PTT is the largest Chinese language-based BBS in the world.

The main site was founded on 9 September 1995 by Yi-Chin Tu (杜奕瑾 Dù Yìjǐn), then a sophomore in the Department of Computer Science and Information Engineering at National Taiwan University. PTT2 was founded in 2000, with the aim of providing a similar system centered around groups and individuals. PTT3, powered by MediaWiki, was founded in 2004 in Washington, D.C., United States for Taiwanese students studying abroad. PTT also provides wiki and blog services for registered users. The PTTwiki service was activated on 5 February 2004 and powered by Tavi wiki system. It is the main wiki service for individuals in Taiwan.

PTT is an open source project. The source code is released under GPL 2.0.

== Organization ==
PTT is registered as a student organization at the National Taiwan University. The BBS Technology Research Club (臺大 BBS 研究社) was founded in 1999 by several BBS sites at NTU, with Yi-Chin Tu as its leader. In 1999 and 2000, the club held public events on campus for BBS users.

Although PTT is a club and the most famous BBS site in Taiwan, it is not the official BBS site for NTU. The machines and other hardware used to set up PTT was obtained by the administrators without the help of the university, and hence it operates with a high level of freedom. However, it still operates on the NTU network, and hence must abide by its rules and regulations.

== System ==
PTT runs under Linux, while PTT2 runs under FreeBSD 4.11 and PTT3 runs under cloud services provided by Microsoft Azure. The BBS system used by PTT, PTT2, PTT3 is called Open PTT, and is under the GPL.

== Development ==
The code for PTT was originally forked from MapleBBS 2.36 that operated the Sun of Beach BBS. Many programmers and system administrators contributed to the PTT project, with the goals of making PTT efficient in terms for memory usage and disk access and allowing as many users on the system at a single time as possible. The code is licensed under GPL 2.0.

=== Open PTT ===
Open PTT is a BBS implementation known for its ease of installation, which is why many BBSes directly run Open PTT as their system.

=== Current PTT ===
Another fork of the PTT code is known as Current PTT, which is documented at the PttCurrent board. This is the version of the code that runs PTT and PTT2, with many additional features. It currently supports the FreeBSD and Linux platforms.

=== Commenting: commendation and criticism ===
PTT implements an article commendation (推文) and criticism (噓文) scheme as its article rating and commenting system, in place since 25 May 2002. PTT was the first Chinese-language BBS to implement such a system. Under this system, users can evaluate an article by giving it a tuei (推), adding a point, or a hsü (噓), subtracting a point. Individual boards can turn off this feature or set a minimum amount of waiting time between comments.

=== Sticky posts ===
Sticky posts reside at the bottom of the forum, right after the most recent posts.

=== Boards ===
The forums are subdivided into boards (Chinese: 看板; pinyin: Kànbǎn; lit. 'noticeboard', 'bulletinboard') and named by a string of alphanumeric characters. These boards can be searched as well as ordered by popularity. They can also be added to a user's list of favorite boards.

=== Guardian Angels ===
The Guardian Angels is a group of experienced PTT users who act as mentors and help answer questions that new users might have. The guardian angels remain anonymous. This system has been in place since May 2004. The 29th of every month is Guardian Angel Day, during which users express their gratitude towards their guardian angels.

== Culture ==
=== Glossary ===
Term	Pinyin transliteration	Literal meaning	Context
五樓	Wǔ lóu	"fifth floor"	The fifth comment of a post, which is often regarded as words of wisdom.
五樓請給分		"fifth floor, please rate this post"	The fifth comment of a post, which is often regarded as words of wisdom.
鄕民	Xiāng mín	"villager"	Refers to PTT users. Comes from the line 「我是跟鄕民進來看熱鬧的」 in the Stephen Chow movie Hail the Judge. This term can also be pejorative, suggesting that users blindly follow other users.
新警察	Xīn jǐngchá	"rookie police officer"	Refers to new users (like the term "newbie").
科科	Kē kē	kk	A chuckle, normally ㄎㄎ, but changed to 科科 when the use of bopomofo is prohibited.
臺肯		"to hit home"	A pun on 中肯 (Zhòngkěn), meaning "to hit home", referring to efforts of the Chen Shui-bian government to replace the character 中 (China) with 臺 (Taiwan).
靠邀，圖咧？		"wtf, where's the picture?"	PTT users often ask for pictures, similar to some Western online communities.
沒圖沒眞相		"pics or it didn't happen"	PTT users often ask for pictures, similar to some Western online communities.
原po是正妹	Yuán po shìzhèng mèi	"the original poster is a pretty girl"	
孩子的學習不能等	Háizi de xuéxí bùnéng děng	"our children's education cannot wait"	
丁丁是個人才	Dīngdīng shìgè réncái	"Tinky Winky is talented"	Said ironically, to insinuate that someone is stupid.
腦殘	Nǎocán	"brain-damaged"	
閃開 讓專業的來	Shǎn kāi ràng zhuānyè de lái	"Step aside, let the pro do the job"	
五二零	wǔ èr líng	520	A pun on "wǒ ài nǐ" (我愛你), which means "I love you".

Some of the popular terms used by PTT users are vulgar, which has caused public concern, while others believe that as long as this behavior is contained online and does not affect the user's real-life behavior, this is nothing to be concerned about.

=== Aligned comments and comment art ===
Aligned comments (推齊) is a cultural phenomenon in which users align their comments for special effect. Comment art (推圖) is a phenomenon inspired by the 2chAA community, in which lines of comments collectively form a picture. Since comment art is sometimes perceived as waste of system resources, some of the forums prohibit its use.

=== Blood drive ===
In 2004, PTT activities coordinator Huan-Yu Chen (陳奐宇) teamed up with an on-campus organization NTU Blood-Donating Bus (台大號捐血車) to hold a blood drive to solicit blood donations in exchange for PTT money, which led to the creation of the Donate-Blood forum.

=== 2018 logo design contest ===
The management team of PTT held a logo design contest from May 6 to July 15, 2018. Users could submit their logo designs by posting on the contest board with their PTT ID as the title of the post. The submission session lasted from May 6 to June 15, 2018. All PTT users had two weeks (June 16, 2018 – June 30, 2018) to vote for their favorite design. The management team then together decided three winners of this contest from the ten most voted designs (July 3–13, 2018). The winner (announced on July 15, 2018) was awarded 1,000,000 P coins (currency on PTT) along with other souvenirs. The winning design was posted on the official Facebook page and website for a year.

== Incidents and controversy ==
As PTT is a liberal platform for public opinion, it allows netizens to access and comment on social matters easily, including news or specific persons, based on their personal perspective and/or agenda. However, since netizens on PTT do not need to disclose their real names while citing news or publishing their opinions, some netizens abuse their status of anonymity and make undesirable comments. PTT is therefore easily used to publish fake news and incite cyberbullying. The death of model and actress Cindy Yang is an occurrence of this, and it is the first time that PTT users were made aware of this issue. Cindy Yang, a model and actress, committed suicide in 2015 after suffering from taunts and accusations from various social media users, notably those on PTT.

The news about Yang's suicide triggered a heated discussion. Some netizens began to self-examine the bullying culture in PTT. Celebrities, politicians, and their families are often targets of bullying by PTT users, including Chen Hsing-Yu, the daughter of former president Chen Shui-bian. She and her boyfriend's (now husband's) relationship became the cover story of the first issue of The Next Magazine. Subsequently, corruption incidents attributed to her father, and insider trading allegations against her partner were leveraged for harassment by users of PTT for several years.

Additionally, in 2017, the Islamic Association of Taiwan publicly criticized PTT for allowing its users to spread fake news and post hate speech about Muslims, and calling it names such as "garbage religion" or "Muslims are trash", thus the Islamic Association of Taiwan protested against the government to voice concern about the abuse of anonymity on PTT. Much of the fake news is copied and recycled by tabloids and even mainstream media, and causes foreign media to be confused, particularly during elections.

In 2009, Dell Computer's mispricing of its LCD monitor and notebook products on its official website aroused lots of PTT users to search for cheap deals. Thousands of netizens were mobilized to order the mispriced items to sell at a fraction of their original prices within just a few hours. At the beginning, some netizens ordered a small amount of the mispriced products. Many of them posted photos about their orders and led other PTT users to engage in irrational and extreme behavior. A PTT account with the username "connyli", for instance, posted the photo showing his orders were valued more than NT$360 million. By 7:00 a.m. the next morning, when Dell urgently closed its online order system, more than 43,000 orders, valued at NT$2 billion, had been placed from PTT causing Dell computer to almost collapse. The court, however, finally ruled against PTT users who tried to take advantage of erroneous information to force Dell to sell below their cost, and the case was dismissed.

=== The death of Taiwan's representative in Osaka ===
Like all other anonymous or semi-anonymous internet communities in Taiwan, there is plenty of fake news and many acts of cyberbullying on PTT. In recent years, the most notable is one of Su Chii-Cherng (蘇啟誠), Taiwan's representative in Osaka, who committed suicide in 2018. Su Chii-Cherng left a letter saying that he was suffering from the hate speech he had received. His office was accused of not assisting Taiwanese tourists stranded at the Kansai International Airport in the wake of Typhoon Jebi.

During the Typhoon Jebi crisis, it was falsely reported that Taiwanese tourists had to identify themselves as Chinese in order to be allowed to board a Chinese bus that was used during the rescue efforts, which resulted in Frank Hsieh, Taiwan's representative in Japan, receiving criticism from other PTT users.

A PTT account with the username "idcc" posted messages that claimed that the Osaka office was beyond Hsieh's control and said that the Osaka office should take all responsibility for the crisis. This was untrue because the Osaka office directly reports to Frank Hsieh's office, which is the highest-ranking government office of Taiwan in Japan; the Taiwan Representative Office. Yet, the Osaka office took the blame from the media and netizens. Su found it unbearable and committed suicide.

Prosecutors later found that the account's IP address could be linked directly to Slow Yang, who is considered as pro-DPP figure and a member of Frank Hsieh's faction. Furthermore, Slow Yang was accused of paying and asking others to post fake news in order to protect Frank Hsieh at the expense of Su's life.

=== Manipulation of public opinion by political parties ===
According to interviews from Common Wealth Magazine, one of the biggest business magazines in Taiwan, people try to form public opinions in PTT and seek to influence the larger society especially during an election year.

=== Han Kuo-Yu and FFASIC ===
In April 2019, a PTT account with the username "ken4645" posted an article titled "Are Wang Jin-Pyng and Han Kuo-Yu related to China's online warriors?" This article, along with several fake photos, alleged that the Farmers' and Fishermen's Association South Information Center (FFASIC) and KMT presidential candidate Han Kuo-Yu received funds from China and tried to purchase Facebook pages for spreading misleading information in order to influence public opinion related to the election. However, the article was later proved to be false. The user spreading the hoax was proved to be linked to the pro-DPP group and thereafter was investigated by the prosecutor.

=== Tsai Ing-wen's dissertation ===
In June 2019, the Taiwan People News published a column written by Cao Chang-Qing which alleged that President Tsai Ing-Wen paid off officials at the London School of Economics (LSE) to obtain her Ph.D. This article raised thousands of comments on PTT. However, after several months, LSE officially verified that Tsai was awarded her Ph.D. in 1984 and disproved the accusations against her. However, even after the official statement from LSE, some people continued to call the authenticity of President Tsai's PhD degree into question. For instance, Dennis Peng, who has openly questioned Tsai's PhD title since 2019.

== See also ==
- 2channel
- 4chan
- Digg
- Diigo
- Delicious
- Fark
- Imgur
- MetaFilter
- Reddit
- StumbleUpon
- Slashdot
- Social bookmarking
- Social news
- Web 2.0
