= Operation Earnest Voice =

American communications program

Operation Earnest Voice (OEV) is a psychological operation by the United States Central Command (CENTCOM) that uses sockpuppets to spread pro-American propaganda on targeted social networking services based outside of the United States.

== Details ==
OEV was first used in Iraq against forums used by al-Qaeda members and insurgents. It was thought to have been later directed at jihadists in Pakistan, Afghanistan as well as countries in the Middle East. In 2011, the US government signed a $2.8 million contract with the Ntrepid web-security company to develop specialized software, allowing agents of the US government to post propaganda on "foreign-language websites" with the use of sockpuppets.

Main characteristics of the software, as stated in the software development request, are:

- Fifty user "operator" licenses, 10 sockpuppets controllable by each user.
- Sockpuppets are to be "replete with background, history, supporting details, and cyber presences that are technically, culturally and geographically consistent." Sockpuppets are to "be able to appear to originate in nearly any part of the world."
- A special secure VPN, allowing sockpuppets to appear to be posting from "randomly selected IP addresses," in order to "hide the existence of the operation."
- Fifty static IP addresses to enable government agencies to "manage their persistent online personas," with identities of government and enterprise organizations protected which will allow for different state agents to use the same sockpuppet, and easily switch between different sockpuppets to "look like ordinary users as opposed to one organization."
- Nine private servers, "based on the geographic area of operations the customer is operating within and which allow a customer's online persona(s) to appear to originate from." These servers should use commercial hosting centers around the world.
- Virtual machine environments, deleted after each session termination, to avoid interaction with "any virus, worm, or malicious software."

== Statements ==
CENTCOM commander David Petraeus, in his congressional testimony, stated that Operation Earnest Voice would "reach [a country's] regional audiences through traditional media, as well as via Web sites and regional public-affairs blogging," as an effort to "counter extremist ideology and propaganda". However, his successor, Jim Mattis, altered the program to have "regional blogging" fall under general CENTCOM public-affairs activity. On how they would operate on these blogs, Petraeus said: "We bring out the moderate voices. We amplify those. And in more detail, we detect and we flag if there is adversary, hostile, corrosive content in some open-source Web forum, [and] we engage with the Web administrators to show that this violates Web site provider policies."

== See also ==
- State-sponsored Internet propaganda
- Propaganda in the United States
- Internet Research Agency
- CIA influence on public opinion
- Congress for Cultural Freedom
- Operation Wandering Soul
- United States Congressional staff edits to Wikipedia
