= Jewish Internet Defense Force =

Online activist group

- Abbreviation: JIDF
- Purpose: Online activism, Israel advocacy
- Website: thejidf.org (Archived February 2014, now dead)

The Jewish Internet Defense Force (JIDF) was an organization that ran social media campaigns from 2000 to 2014 against websites and Facebook groups that it described as Islamic terrorism or antisemitism. The group's website, whose former domain now links to a gambling site, described the JIDF as a "private, independent, non-violent protest organization representing a collective of activists". The JIDF's activities were termed "hacktivism" by the BBC and Haaretz. The JIDF web site was live in February 2014 with little activity, and is no longer available.

== Organization and methods ==
According to the JIDF, they "formed as a grassroots effort in 2000, to mount mass e-mail campaigns, in response to the outbreak of the Second Intifada." The website was run by a person who identified himself as "David Appletree." According to a reporter from The Jewish Week in 2009, he "[would] not say if that is his true surname". In the same article, Appletree accused Facebook administrators of antisemitism for closing down his account. A Facebook spokesperson replied that the account was terminated because the website did not believe he was using his real name, a breach of Facebook's "real name culture". Appletree said that he maintained about 40 Facebook groups focused on combating terrorism and antisemitism.

The group focused its attention on websites like Facebook, YouTube, Google Earth, and Wikipedia. The JIDF redirected anti-Israel Facebook groups to other pages it preferred and changed the names of Muslim members of such groups to "Mossad collaborator," among other actions. A website spokesman told the Israeli newspaper Haaretz that they don't break any laws and that the JIDF "prefers the terms 'seize control,' 'take over' or 'infiltrate' rather than 'hack' to describe there actions.'

In an interview with Arutz Sheva, Appletree maintained, "The Jewish establishment... has completely failed Israel and the Jewish people in every way imaginable."

=== On Facebook ===
During 2007, a controversy on Facebook was reported involving "the drop-down list of places members can use to show where they live". A Facebook group titled, "Palestine Is not a country ... Delist it from Facebook as a country!", had been formed in 2007 which petitioned Facebook management to remove Palestine from Facebook's list of countries. Several Facebook groups formed to support or oppose this removal including "Israel is not a country! Delist it from Facebook as a country". Matt Hicks of Facebook responded by saying: "As long as the groups meet our terms of use, they can stay up. But we encourage users to report anything that is racist or objectionable." The JIDF claimed the "Israel is not a Country" group was antisemitic and mobilized supporters to complain to Facebook in an effort to have it deleted. After Facebook refused to shut the group down, the JIDF said it somehow took control of the group in July 2008.

According to a November 2008 article in Haaretz, the JIDF forwarded lists of Facebook groups that it deemed promoted hatred or violence to the website's administrators, hoping they would be removed. According to a man named "David" quoted in the Haaretz article, Facebook either did nothing or waited months before taking action. "David" told Haaretz that his group then decided to try to technically "intercept Facebook groups and make them impossible to access." The JIDF was particularly upset about Facebook groups praising the shooting of students at Jerusalem's Mercaz HaRav Yeshiva in March 2008.

In July 2009, the JIDF and Avi Dichter took credit for successfully pressuring Facebook into removing a fan page for Hizbullah leader Hassan Nasrallah. The JIDF said it mobilized supporters to complain about the page to Facebook's owners. The JIDF website claims that it deleted the vast majority of a pro-Hezbollah fan page's 118,000 members. The JIDF sites says it has removed more than 100 antisemitic groups from Facebook, In September 2009 that it hijacked a Facebook group titled "Eliminate Israel from Being" and deleted more than 5,000 members before Facebook management "returned control of the site to its administrators."

The JIDF criticized Facebook for allegedly condoning and hosting Holocaust denial groups on its network. The group charged that Facebook is hypocritical in removing groups that support the Ku Klux Klan, for instance, while not removing what it considers Holocaust denial groups and claimed it would continue to criticize Facebook over the matter.

=== Elsewhere on the Web ===
JIDF's measures "include reporting Wikipedia editors it claims are anti-Israel, and taking action against entries seen as including one-sided or false accounts of the history of Israel and the Mideast conflict," Haaretz wrote. The group sought to have Palestinian villages listed as having been destroyed during the foundation of Israel removed from Google Earth and campaigned against the description of "Palestine" as a country.

The JIDF organized a pro-Gilad Shalit campaign in 2009 on the social networking site Twitter. During the "Tweet4Shalit" campaign Twitter users drove the Gilad Shalit name to the second highest trend on the day of his 23rd birthday. Tweets for Shalit ranged from the demand to "Free Shalit" to requests for international supervision of the case.

The JIDF was recognized by the JTA as one of the "100 Most Influential Jewish Twitterers" in 2009 and was ranked as the top-ranked Jewish Newswire.

== Criticism ==
In October 2008, the German newspaper the Frankfurter Allgemeine Zeitung (FAZ) wrote "the JIDF follows an open political agenda as well. Many of its members protested the clearing of Israeli settlements in the Gaza Strip in 2005 – they regard this policy of trading Land for Peace as wrong." The newspaper wrote that "Ultimately the JIDF also wants to propagate 'Jewish values on the Internet'. This leads to the self-appointed warriors against online-hatred to link their own homepage to a dubious site named 'thereligionofpeace.com'. The JIDF website itself said "Mohammed was a genocidal pedophile... Millions of Muslims promote the idea that if we "insult" him (despite the fact that he's dead), that we should be killed." The website said that Mohammad was a "false prophet" and that the "Islamic ideology itself... is determined to dominate the world, just as Nazism was." The website came out against plans to build an Islamic cultural center near Ground Zero in New York, "we are against ALL mosques. We are against Islam, just as we are against Nazism. Just as we don't wish to see Nazi institutions springing up everywhere, we don't need to see Islamic one's springing up everywhere, either." The JIDF also claimed that all Muslims are "terrorists".

In May 2009, CNN wrote that the JIDF is "sometimes guilty of sweeping generalizations of its own", citing a 2008 interview published on Facebook critic Brian Cuban's site in which a JIDF representative discussed "the issues surrounding [then-candidate Barack Obama's] terrorist connections as well as his racist and anti-Semitic church, which has supported Hamas and the Rev. Louis Farrakhan", and the reply when asked how the Jewish and Muslim communities saw the JIDF, that "99.9% of Muslims hate us". CNN quoted a JIDF spokesperson as saying he would rather people not focus on those specific quotations as the interview had been "informal" and Cuban "would not let us correct any of our statements after we quickly answered him to help him meet his deadline." Asked in the Cuban interview, "What is the position of the JIDF on the 'Palestinian Question' regarding disputes over occupied lands", the spokesman replied, "Palestinians should be transferred out of Israeli territories. They can live in any of the other many Arab states. We are against all land concessions to our enemies. We are against the release of terrorist prisoners from Israeli prisons."

== See also ==
- Public diplomacy of Israel
- Internet activism
- Internet Haganah
- HonestReporting
- Committee for Accuracy in Middle East Reporting in America
