= 50 Cent Party =

Chinese government employees making online posts

- Simplified Chinese: 五毛党
- Traditional Chinese: 五毛黨
- Literal meaning: five-dime party
Transcriptions
Standard Mandarin
- Hanyu Pinyin: wǔmáo dǎng
- Bopomofo: ㄨˇ ㄇㄠˊ ㄉㄤˇ
- Wade–Giles: wu^{3}-mao^{2} tang^{3}
Yue: Cantonese
- Jyutping: ng^{5}mou^{4} dong^{2}

Ziganwu
- Simplified Chinese: 自干五
- Traditional Chinese: 自乾五
Transcriptions
Standard Mandarin
- Hanyu Pinyin: zì gān wǔ
- Bopomofo: ㄗˋ ㄍㄢ ㄨˇ
- Wade–Giles: tzŭ^{4} kan^{1} wu^{3}
Yue: Cantonese
- Jyutping: zi^{6} gon^{1} ng^{5}

Internet commentator(s)
- Simplified Chinese: 网络评论员
- Traditional Chinese: 網絡評論員
Transcriptions
Standard Mandarin
- Hanyu Pinyin: wǎngluò pínglùn yuán
- Bopomofo: ㄨㄤˇ ㄌㄨㄛˋ ㄆㄧㄥˊ ㄌㄨㄣˋ ㄩㄢˊ
- Wade–Giles: wang^{3}-luo^{4} ping^{2}-lun^{4} yüan^{2}
Yue: Cantonese
- Jyutping: mong^{5}lok^{3} ping^{4}leon^{6} jyun^{4}

The 50 Cent Party, also known as the 50 Cent Army or wumao (/ˈwuːmaʊ/; from Chinese: 五毛; lit. 'five dimes'), are Chinese government employees posting online comments to divert public attention or promote positive sentiment. The program was created during the early phases of the Internet's rollout to the wider public in China. Government workers produced about 448 million out of 80.4 billion (or 1 out of 178) posts on the Chinese internet every year, concentrated heavily on official government websites and during major events.

The name "50 Cent Party" is derived from claims that government hired commentators are reportedly paid RMB¥0.50 (5 jiao) for every post in order to shape public opinion in ways favorable towards Chinese Communist Party (CCP) policies.

Some Internet commentators describe themselves as ziganwu (Chinese: 自干五, short for 自带干粮的五毛, zì dài gānliáng de wǔmáo, lit. 'wumao who bring their own dry rations'), stating that they express voluntary support for China and are not paid by authorities.

A study published in 2017 points out that almost everything known about the 50 Cent Party in the past had been wrong. Most combative posts and commentators attributed to the 50 Cent Party were instead linked to private nationalistic individuals. Actual 50 Cent Party content largely avoids heated discussions, controversial or sensitive topics, and focuses instead on cheerleading unrelated valence issues. This is likely meant to distract, change the subject, or promote positive sentiment. These posts are made by government employees contributing part time outside their regular jobs and not paid for extra, which would cost an enormous sum every year. Approximately half of these are posted on the government's own websites.

== History ==
In October 2004, the local CCP Propaganda Department of Changsha started hiring Internet commentators, in one of the earliest known uses of professional Internet commentators.

In March 2005, the Ministry of Education enacted a systematic censorship of Chinese college bulletin board systems (BBS). The popular "Little Lily" BBS, run by Nanjing University, was forced to close. As a new system was prepared to be launched, school officials hired students as part-time web commentators, paid from the university's work-study funds, to search the forum for undesirable information and actively counter it with Party-friendly viewpoints. In the following months, party leaders from Jiangsu began hiring their own teams. By mid-2007, web commentator teams recruited by schools, and party organizations were common across China. Shanghai Normal University employed undergraduates to monitor for signs of dissent and post on university forums. These commentators not only operate within political discussions, but also in general discussions. Afterwards, some schools and local governments also started to build similar teams.

On 23 January 2007, Chinese leader Hu Jintao demanded a "reinforcement of ideological and public opinion front construction and positive publicity" at the 38th collective learning session of the Politburo of the Chinese Communist Party. Large Chinese websites and local governments have been requested to publish the sayings of Hu, and select "comrades with good political quality" to form "teams of Internet commentators" by the CCP Central Committee (中共中央办公厅) and General Office of the State Council (国务院办公厅).

Negative reporting of local authorities has increased on the Internet since then. In one instance described on the China Digital Times, the Jiaozuo (Henan) City Public Security Bureau established a mechanism to analyze public opinion after criticism of the police handling of a traffic incident appeared on the Internet. The Bureau responded with 120 staff calling for the truth to be revealed in line with the public opinion, which gradually shifted and eventually supported the police position, denouncing the original poster. In the aftermath of the 2008 Weng'an riot, Internet forums were filled with posts critical of the local authorities; the China Newsweek later reported that "the major task of the propaganda group was to organize commentators to past [sic] posts on websites to guide online public opinions."

In 2010, the Shanghai Communist Youth League's official website published a summary, saying that there were more than 200 topics by Shanghai Municipal Authorities' Internet commentators posted at People's Daily, Xinhua News Agency, Eastday (东方网), Sina and Tianya after many incidents in 2009, including the Lotus Riverside incident, the forced installation of Green Dam Youth Escort software, the Putuo Urban Administrative incident, the control of H1N1, the Shanghai entrapment incident (钓鱼执法), the self-immolation of Pan Rong (潘蓉), etc. It was praised by the Shanghai Internet Publicity Office.

In December 2014, a Chinese blogger hacked into and published email archives for the Internet Propaganda Department of Zhanggong District in Ganzhou, including over 2,700 emails of 50 Cent Party Internet commentators. For instance, on 16 January 2014, Shi Wenqing, secretary of the Ganzhou branch of the CCP, held a televised "Internet exchange" in which he answered questions from a local news website forum; 50 Cent Party commentators were instructed to post seven discussion points, such as (translated) "I really admire Party Secretary Shi, what a capable and effective Party Secretary! I hope he can be the father of Ganzhou for years to come."

In the 2020s, the Chinese government began outsourcing these types of astroturfing and censorship jobs to private for-profit companies for better precision and cost effectiveness.

== Range of operation ==
The Ministry of Culture now holds regular training sessions, where participants are required to pass an exam after which they are issued a job certification. As of 2008, the total number of 50-cent operatives was estimated to be in the tens of thousands, and possibly as high as 280,000–300,000. Every large Chinese website is instructed by the Information Office to create a trained team of Internet commentators. The Cyberspace Administration of China (shortened as Chinese: 网信办) directly recruit and provide continuous training for internet commentators (Chinese: 网评员) to respond to online emergencies under new forms of public opinion dissemination channels on various social media platforms, and state-owned entities regularly hold commemoration ceremonies for outstanding staff on the provincial and county-levels.

According to the Chinese Communists' opinions of the recruitment of university Work Committee (tentative), the university Internet commentators are mainly selected from cadres or student cadres at the local CCP Publicity Department of universities, Youth League, Office of Academic Affairs, Network Center, Admissions Employment Department, Political Theory Department, Teaching Department and other units.

The court of Qinghe District, Huai'an organized a team of 12 commentators. Gansu Province hired 650 commentators, sorted by their writing abilities. Suqian Municipal Publicity Department's first 26 commentators' team were reported by Yangtse Evening Post in April 2005. According to high-profile independent Chinese blogger Li Ming, the pro-Chinese government web commentators must number "at least in the tens of thousands".

A 2016 Harvard study estimated that the group posts about 488 million social media comments per year.

According to a post by Xiao Qiang on China Digital Times, the following was a leaked directive sent to 50 Cent Party Internet commentators.

In order to circumscribe the influence of Taiwanese democracy, in order to progress further in the work of guiding public opinion, and in accordance with the requirements established by higher authorities to "be strategic, be skilled", we hope that internet commentators conscientiously study the mindset of netizens, grasp international developments, and better perform the work of being an internet commentator. For this purpose, this notice is promulgated as set forth below:

1. To the extent possible make America the target of criticism. Play down the existence of Taiwan.
2. Do not directly confront [the idea of] democracy; rather, frame the argument in terms of "what kind of system can truly implement democracy."
3. To the extent possible, choose various examples in Western countries of violence and unreasonable circumstances to explain how democracy is not well-suited to capitalism.
4. Use America's and other countries' interference in international affairs to explain how Western democracy is actually an invasion of other countries and [how the West] is forcibly pushing [on other countries] Western values.
5. Use the bloody and tear-stained history of a [once] weak people [i.e., China] to stir up pro-Party and patriotic emotions.
6. Increase the exposure that positive developments inside China receive; further accommodate the work of maintaining [social] stability.

In 2010, a contributor to The Huffington Post stated that some comments she received on one of her posts were from the 50 Cent Party; she also stated that the 50 Cent Party monitors popular US websites, news sites and blogs and posts comments that advance Chinese governmental interests.

== Terminology ==
There is an alternate official term for the Internet commentator, as well as several unofficial terms coined by netizens for them:

	Chinese (Simp. / Trad.)	Pinyin	Literally in English	Commonly in English	Note
Official name (primary)	网络评论员 / 網絡評論員	wǎngluò pínglùn yuán	Internet commentator		Abbreviation in Chinese: 网评员 / 網評員 (wǎng píng yuán)
Official name (secondary)	网络阅评员 / 網絡閱評員	wǎngluò yuè píng yuán	Internet examiner and commentator	N/A	Abbreviation in Chinese: 网评员 / 網評員 (wǎng píng yuán)
Unofficial term	五毛党 / 五毛黨 or simply 五毛	wǔmáo dǎng or wǔmáo	Five-dime Party, or simply "five dimes"	50 Cent Party, 50 Cent Army.	The most common name, used pejoratively.
Unofficial term	网评猿 / 網評猿	wǎng píng yuán	ape that comments on the 'net	N/A	A pejorative pronounced identically with the Chinese abbreviation 网评员; wǎng píng yuán above, punning yuán (猿; "ape; monkey") for yuán (员; "personnel, staff member").
Other English terms	红马甲 / 紅馬甲, 红卫兵 / 紅衛兵	hóng mǎjiǎ, hóng wèibīng	red vest, red guard		The Chinese translation for these English terms are rarely used.

Among those names, "50 Cent Party" (五毛党) was the most common and pejorative unofficial term.

According to Foreign Policy, Chinese cyberspace is also noted for its ideological contests between "rightists" – reformists who advocate Western-style democratic reforms, versus "leftists" – conservatives and neo-Confucianists who advocate Chinese nationalism and restructured socialism. In this backdrop, rightists sometimes refer to leftists derogatorily as "50 Centers", regardless of their actual employment background.

The Hong Kong-based Apple Daily reported that although a search for "五毛党" ("50 Cent Party" in Chinese) on a search engine produces results, most were inaccessible and had been deleted.

Some internet commentators label themselves ziganwu (Chinese: 自干五, short for 自带干粮的五毛, zì dài gānliáng de wǔmáo, lit. 'wumao who bring their own dry rations'), stating that they are not paid by authorities and express their support for the Chinese government out of their own volition. Journalist Shuyu Zhang writes that this "voluntary 50 cent army" displays "a genuine faith in the party and its commitment to rejuvenate the nation, together with distrust of Western liberal-democratic ideals. They portray themselves as not only more patriotic, but also more rational than most citizens in 'defending the nation against online sabotage and emphasizing facts and logic.'"

== Reception ==
Accoridng to China analyst David Bandurski, the activities of the 50 Cent Party are consistent with what Hu Jintao described as a new pattern of public opinion guidance in 2008.

David Wertime, writing in Foreign Policy, argued that the narrative where a large army of paid Internet commentators are behind China's poor public dialogue with its critics is "Orwellian, yet strangely comforting". Rather, many of the Chinese netizens spreading nationalist sentiment online are not paid, but often mean what they say.

== Misuse ==
Patrick Winn of The World noted that in the English-speaking world, wumao is often used as a pejorative term against perceived supporters of the Chinese government. In this way, it is often misapplied to nationalist Chinese posters acting out of their own volition, thus making it easier to discredit their beliefs and to rile them up. An analyst from the Wilson Center noted that ethnic Chinese are more likely to be called wumao than other groups of people in the English-speaking world. She attributed some of this to racism and the perception that they are less critical of the Chinese government.

A comprehensive study published in 2017 points out that almost everything about the 50 Cent Party in the past as described by journalists, academics, and critics had been wrong. Most combative posts and commentators attributed to the 50 Cent Party were instead linked to private nationalistic individuals. Actual 50 Cent Party content largely avoids heated discussions, controversial or sensitive topics, and focuses instead on cheerleading unrelated valence issues.

== See also ==
- 1450 Internet army, a similar phenomenon in Taiwan
- Buzzer, a similar phenomenon in Indonesia
- Internet censorship in China
- Internet water army, privately paid Chinese commentators
- Little Pink, Chinese nationalist netizens
- Netto-uyoku, Japanese nationalist netizens
- State-sponsored Internet propaganda
