= Internet water army =

Private paid Chinese Internet commentator

An Internet water army (simplified Chinese: 网络水军; traditional Chinese: 網絡水軍; pinyin: Wǎngluò shuǐjūn) is a group of users who are paid to post online comments with vested interest on Chinese language websites. Internet water armies started in the early 2010s. They post news, comments, gossip and disinformation on online platforms like Weibo, WeChat and Taobao, China's eBay-like platform. In this astroturfing technique for public relations and media manipulation, online Chinese companies employ people to post on social media to change public opinion. It has been developed into an industry in which a company specializing in internet water armies can earn 7.6 million yuan within three months and has made over 2.500 transactions. The private Internet water army operations parallel the official 50 Cent Party internet commentators hired by the government of the People's Republic of China or the Chinese Communist Party (CCP) to spread propaganda and disinformation.

The most prominent group is Li Yi Bar.

== Name ==
The water army metaphor refers to "the large number of people who are well organized to flood the Internet with purposeful comments and articles". The Chinese etymology of shuijun meaning "navy" instead of "water army" is translated in the Shuijunshiwan 水军十万 (lit. "navy 100,000") company slogan: "Thousands of navy, for your assignment".

Adam Clark Estes describes the name as, "If the term 'Internet troll' conjures up unintimidating images of angry, acne-faced computer geeks, the phrase 'Internet water army' just sounds horrifying, like a force of besuited villains from a graphic novel. In reality, it's not that scary, but the continually booming business for paid spammers and mission-driven trolls is definitely unsettling."

Xinhua News Agency reported on a new name: "zombies" (jiangshi 僵尸, transl. "zombie"), who are paid followers of Sina Weibo microblogs, and "can be bought and sold online for as little as 4 yuan (63 cents) a thousand".

== Features ==
Paid posting involves thousands of individuals and posters using different online IDs. As of 2008, every day, around 40 percent of the trending hashtags on the social media platform Weibo were created by Internet water armies. The content is usually well-prepared and there is a quality control team to check whether the postings meet the customer's standards. Some companies hire Internet water armies to leave good reviews, and some singers or film stars also pay them to be fake followers on Sina Weibo. The price for posting good comments and bad comments depends on the content. If there are negative reviews about a product or some gossip targeting a person, they must pay the Internet water army to screen and delete the negative comments.

Governmental programs of social media manipulation are found worldwide. China's 50 Cent Party (named from the 0.5 yuan payment per posting) trains and employs tens of thousands of online commentators to promote the PRC party line and control public opinion on microblogs, bulletin board systems, and chatrooms. Nevertheless, there is some difference between internet water army and 50 Cent Party. The concept of 50 Cent Party is narrower since it only refers to paid posters who deflect political discussions and post any positive and supporting reviews related to the central government or CCP. According to a Harvard University study in 2017, it was estimated that there were 448 million social media comments fabricated by the 50 Cent Party hired by the Chinese government at the time. These comments avoid touching upon controversial and sensitive issues.

Water army groups may often be staffed by migrants, housewives and students.

=== Types ===
There are three types of Internet water armies. The first type voluntarily spreads posts promoting social justice, the second is mainly hired by the government or state-owned companies to promote CCP propaganda, and the third works for private companies, such as public relations companies, to pursue their own interests.

=== Tactics ===
A 2010 news story on China Central Television listed three customer services of Internet water armies: promotion of a specific product, company, person or message; slandering an adversary or their products or services, and helping delete negative or unfavorable posts or news articles.

Pricing for Internet water armies tactics varies. Shanghai Daily quoted Tang Jing, an employee of the Web PR company Shuijunshiwang.com, that prices range from a "basic zombie" for less than 5 yuan ($0.79) per 1,000 on the internet marketplace Taobao to an "A-level zombie" having "the characteristics of a real person, with a photo, self-description, tags of categories and its own fans" for 120 yuan ($18.86) per 5,000.

Cheng Chen, a computer science researcher at the University of Victoria, and three colleagues performed an academic study of Internet water army activities. To learn how online Chinese ghostwriters operate, Cheng registered undercover with an Internet PR company that trained and paid him to make social media postings. Each mission had a project manager; a trainer team that plans schedules, distributes shared user IDs, and maintains quality control; a posters team, typically college students and unemployed people, that gets 30 to 50 cents per validated post; a resources team that registers and collects online user IDs; and a PR team that maintains relationships with social media webmasters.

== Reasons ==
Online marketing in China has become a sizeable business and has spawned many Internet public relations agencies. Internet water armies working for these PR firms not only advertise products but also remove negative feedback.

Many celebrity agencies in the entertainment industry and their die-hard fans have been willing to spend a lot of money to hire Internet water armies to generate positive online reviews for their songs and movies. The armies can range from a handful of people to hundreds, who often help celebrities inflate their social media accounts' followers with thousands of fake followers. In addition, some entertainment companies use Internet water armies to bump up film ratings and smear a rival's reputation.

Many people who join an Internet water army think online paid posting is a new type of online part-time job opportunity and an easy way to make money. With the ubiquity of personal computers and smart phones along with easy-to-use microblogging platforms, the entry barrier is low. The income of Internet water armies is a primary reason why many people choose to join them, more than 60% of Internet water army members earn more than a thousand yuan per month by posting and deleting reviews.

== Current affairs ==
In 2017, Chinese Internet regulators imposed strict bans on hiring paid posters as a part of a sweeping campaign to tighten Internet control. Police arrested more than 200 people in 40 water army cases and closed 5,000 paid poster accounts since May 2017. In June, a man was sentenced to five years and nine months in prison and fined 920,000 yuan ($135,000) for generating fake transactions and product reviews on Taobao; it is the first judicial case that a suspect was charged with this offense in China.

In July 2018, the producer of Asura said that their movie's ratings was brought down by fake comments on an influential rating platform.

In August 2018, Guangzhou's latest move targeting the Internet water army was about a larger scale crackdown launched by China's public security authority, involving 77 suspects and 4 million yuan ($635,000).

== Legality ==
Net marketing companies like Internet water armies sometimes operate on murky legal grounds, particularly under international law. The US companies Facebook and Digg sent cease and desist orders to the Australian company uSocial, which ignored them and continues to market "friends" and "votes".

China, unlike many countries, has a strict cyber defamation law, and some Internet Water Army companies have been accused of violating it.

Internet water army practices often result in privacy violations or damaged reputations, and the 2009 revision of China's Tort Liability Law stipulated that in such cases, "the victim has the right to inform the Internet service provider (ISP) to delete harmful postings and that the ISP must face joint liability for damages if it fails to act". China's State Council Information Office announced in 2011 that it "is working out laws to regulate the increasing numbers in the "Internet Army." Wang Chen, director of the office, announced that the Chinese government has paid constant attention to the posters and commentators, who have been found damaging social order both in the real and the virtual world."

In 2007, the cosmetics firm Doctor Bai and health-food company BiosTime both sued the consumer protection website 315ts.net for posting fake comments about their products. "Judges eventually ruled in the website's favor because there was no evidence to suggest the posts were not genuine." According to a 2010 China Daily report, Mengniu Dairy denied paying a Wangluo zhujun company to spread false rumors about dairy products of their competitors Yili Group and Synbutra International. The Shanghai Daily reported in 2011 that the online shopping website Taobao shut down over 200 Internet Water Army companies selling microblog followers.

== Detection ==
Internet water armies are a big threat for cyber security.

Some scholars adopted the Dirichlet process mixture model (DPMM)-based GSP algorithm to detect Internet water armies from Tianya forum. They used DPMM to effectively analyze Internet water army user behavior and use the sequential pattern mining algorithms to determine paid posters' accounts.

An information technology engineer, blogging as Chen Chuanliang Peter, claimed to have developed software that differentiated paid blog "followers", and found that about 17 percent of followers on Sina's ten most popular microblogs "never interacted or responded to those they were following. In other words, they were zombies."

Cheng Chen et al. chose a detection case study of online comments about the 360 v. Tencent conflict between two major Chinese IT companies, each of which was suspected of paying for posts. In 2010, Qihoo, creator of 360 Safeguard, claimed that Tencent's instant message client Tencent QQ secretly scanned users' hard drives. After Tencent blocked 360 Safeguard users from using their messenger app, controversy erupted on social media websites. Cheng's researchers analyzed two large datasets of 360 v. Tencent postings, over 1000 comments from 200 users on Sohu.com and over 20,000 comments from 500 users on Sina.com. They concluded: "Although both 360 and Tencent claimed that they did not hire online paid posters, we now have strong evidence suggesting the opposite. Some special patterns are definitely unusual, e.g., many negative comments or replies came from newly registered user IDs but these user IDs were seldom used afterwards. This clearly indicates the use of online paid posters." The researchers designed and validated detection software, and concluded the "test results on real-world datasets show[ed] very promising performance".

== See also ==
- State-sponsored Internet propaganda
- Little Pink
- Shill
