= Vietnamese Wikipedia =

Vietnamese-language edition of Wikipedia

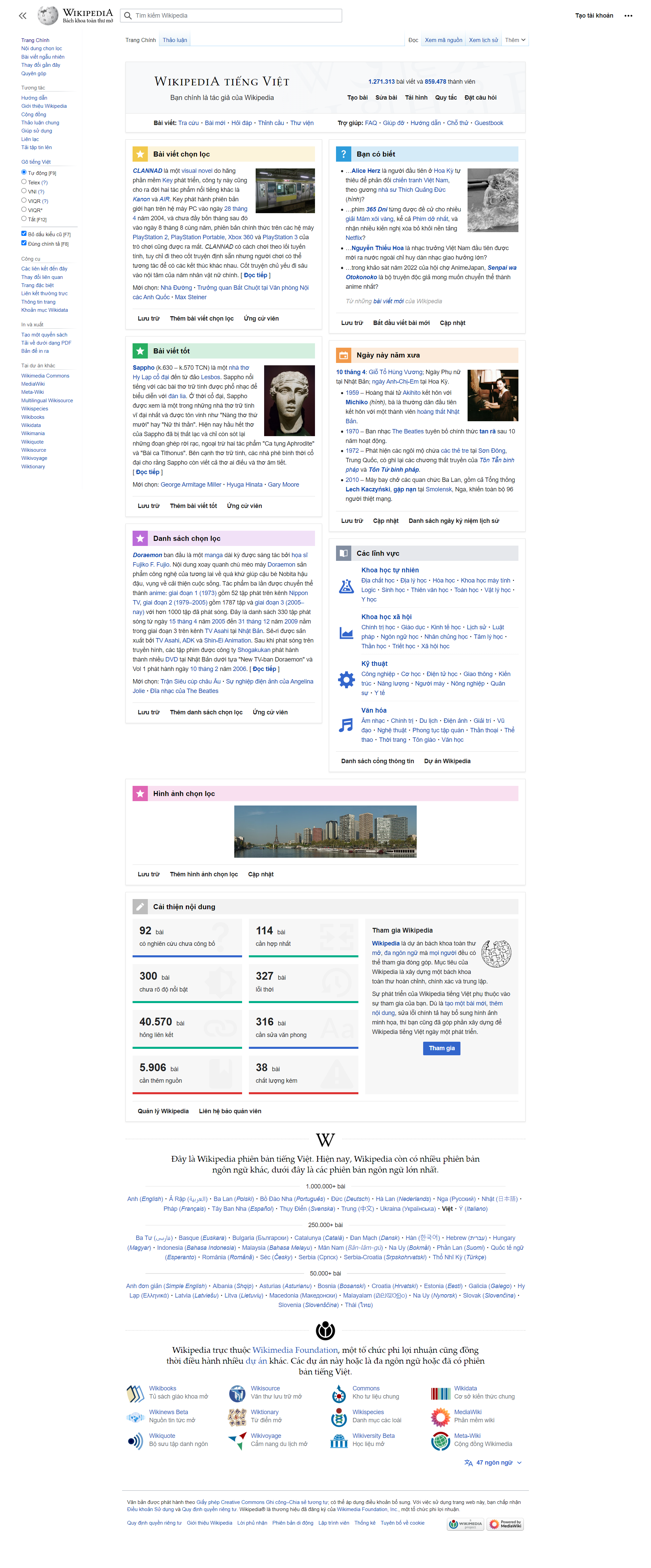
- Main page of the Vietnamese Wikipedia in 10 April 2022
- Website type: Internet encyclopedia project
- Available in: Vietnamese
- Headquarters: Miami, Florida
- Owner: Wikimedia Foundation
- Website: vi.wikipedia.org
- Commercial: No
- Registration: Optional
- Launched: November 2002; 23 years ago
- Content license: Creative Commons Attribution/ Share-Alike 4.0 (most text also dual-licensed under GFDL); Media licensing varies

The Vietnamese Wikipedia (Vietnamese: Wikipedia tiếng Việt) is the Vietnamese-language edition of Wikipedia, a free, publicly editable, online encyclopedia supported by the Wikimedia Foundation. Like the rest of Wikipedia, its content is created and accessed using the MediaWiki wiki software.

== Content ==
As of 20 September 2026, it has 1,304,481 articles and is the 16th-largest Wikipedia. It is the fifth-largest Wikipedia in a non-European language, as well as the third-largest in a language which is official in only one country. In contrast to the English Wikipedia, the Vietnamese Wikipedia allows bots to create articles: as of 2023, more than 58% of its articles had been generated in this way.

== History ==
The Vietnamese Wikipedia initially went online in November 2002, with a front page and an article about the Internet Society. The project received little attention and did not begin to receive significant contributions until it was "restarted" in October 2003 and the newer, Unicode-capable MediaWiki software was installed soon after.

By August 2008, the Vietnamese Wikipedia had grown to more than 50,000 articles—of these, approximately 432 of them were created by bots. By the time the project reached 100,000 articles on September 12, 2009, bot-generated articles made up around 5% of its corpus. Stubs on the wiki number in the hundreds of thousands, including most of the bot-generated articles.

An experimental Wikipedia edition in the obsolete chữ Nôm script began in October 2006 at the Wikimedia Incubator. It was deleted in April 2010.

The Vietnam Wikimedians User Group supports the development of the Vietnamese Wikipedia and other Vietnamese-language Wikimedia projects. It gained formal recognition as a Wikimedia user group on 28 August 2018.

Milestone logos
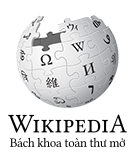
Official logo (current)

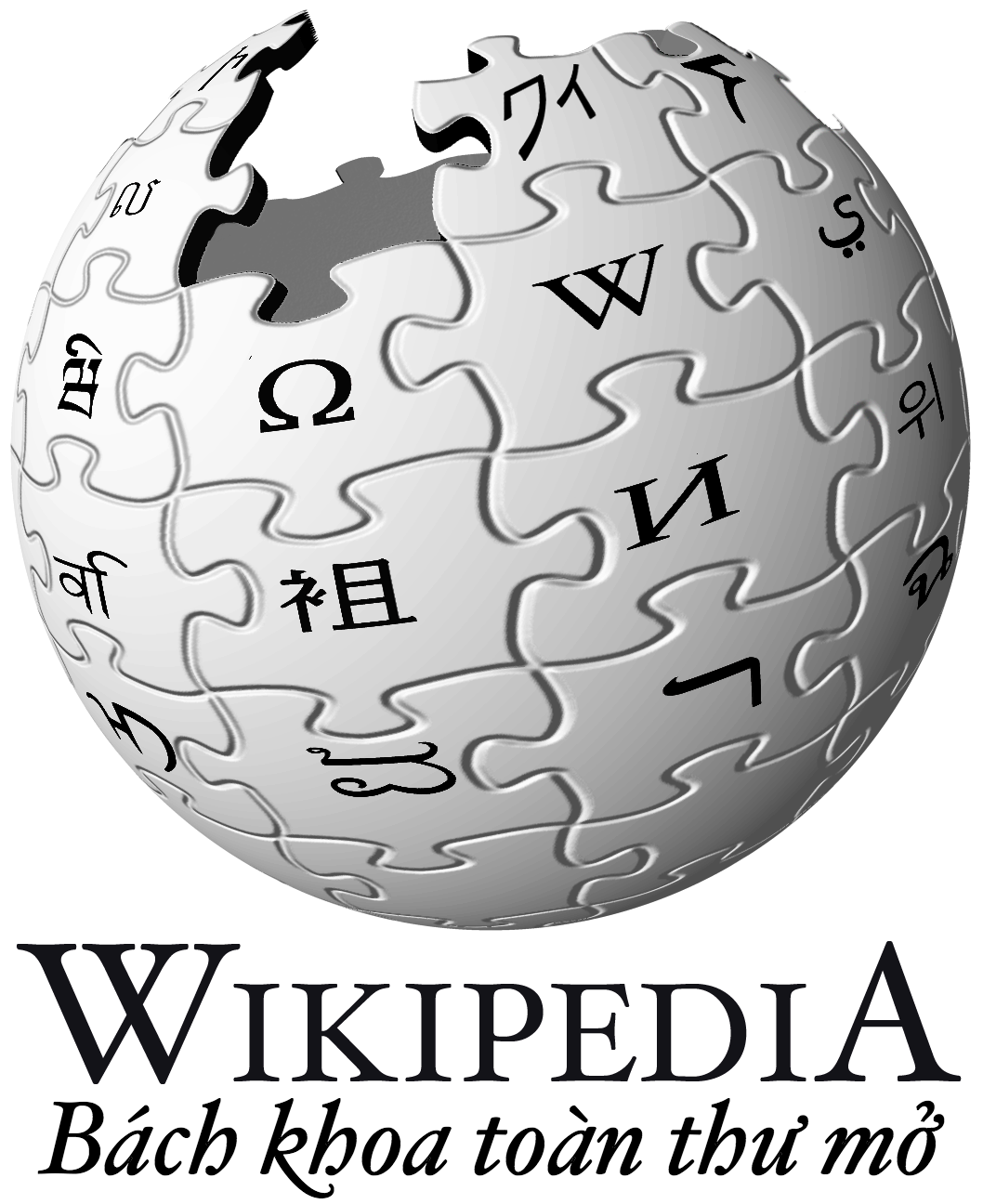
Official logo (no longer in use)

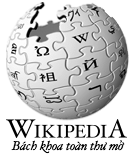
Official logo (no longer in use)

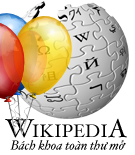
10,000-article logo

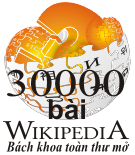
30.000-article logo

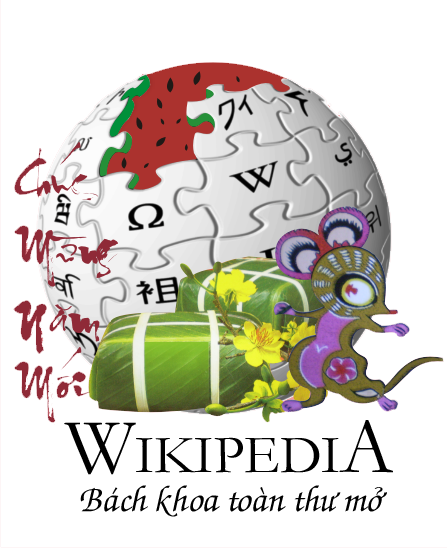
Tết Mậu Tý 2008

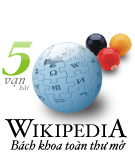
50.000-article logo

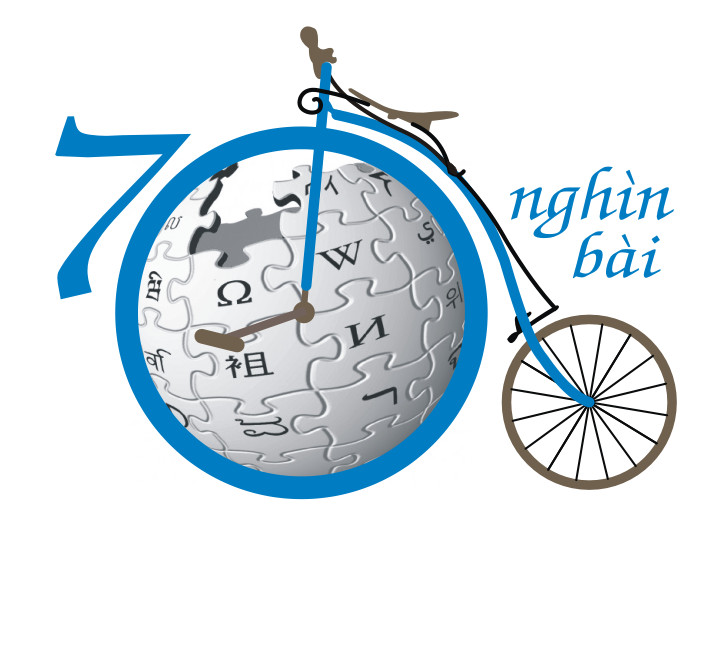
70.000-article logo

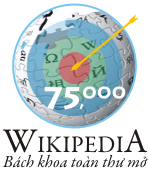
75.000-article logo

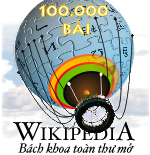
100.000-article logo

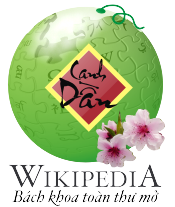
Tết Canh Dần 2010

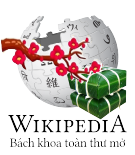
Tết Tân Mão 2011

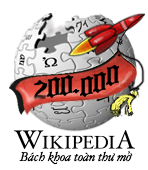
200.000-article logo

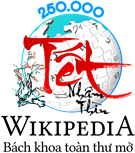
Tết Nhâm Thìn 2012
and 250.000-article logo

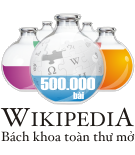
500.000-article logo

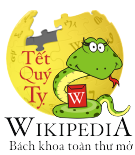
Tết Quý Tỵ 2013

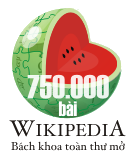
750.000-article logo

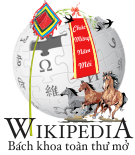
Tết Giáp Ngọ 2014

1 million-article logo

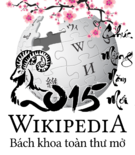
Tết Ất Mùi 2015

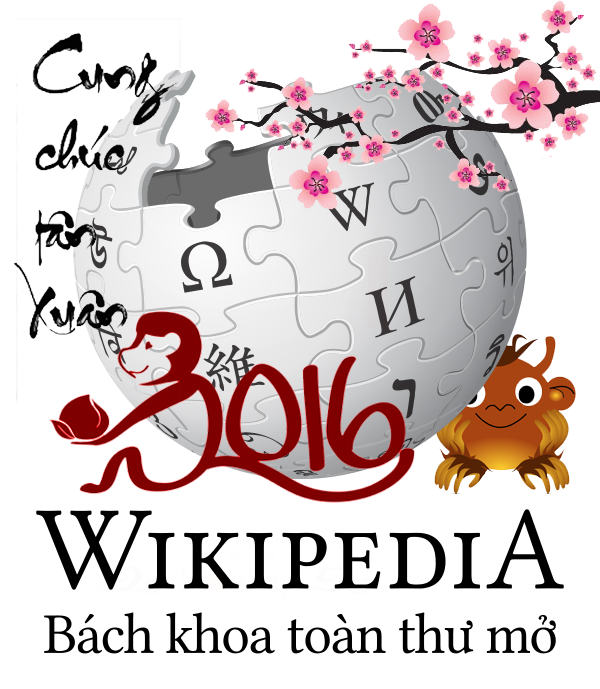
Tết Bính Thân 2016

Tết Đinh Dậu 2017

Tết Mậu Tuất 2018

Tết Kỷ Hợi 2019

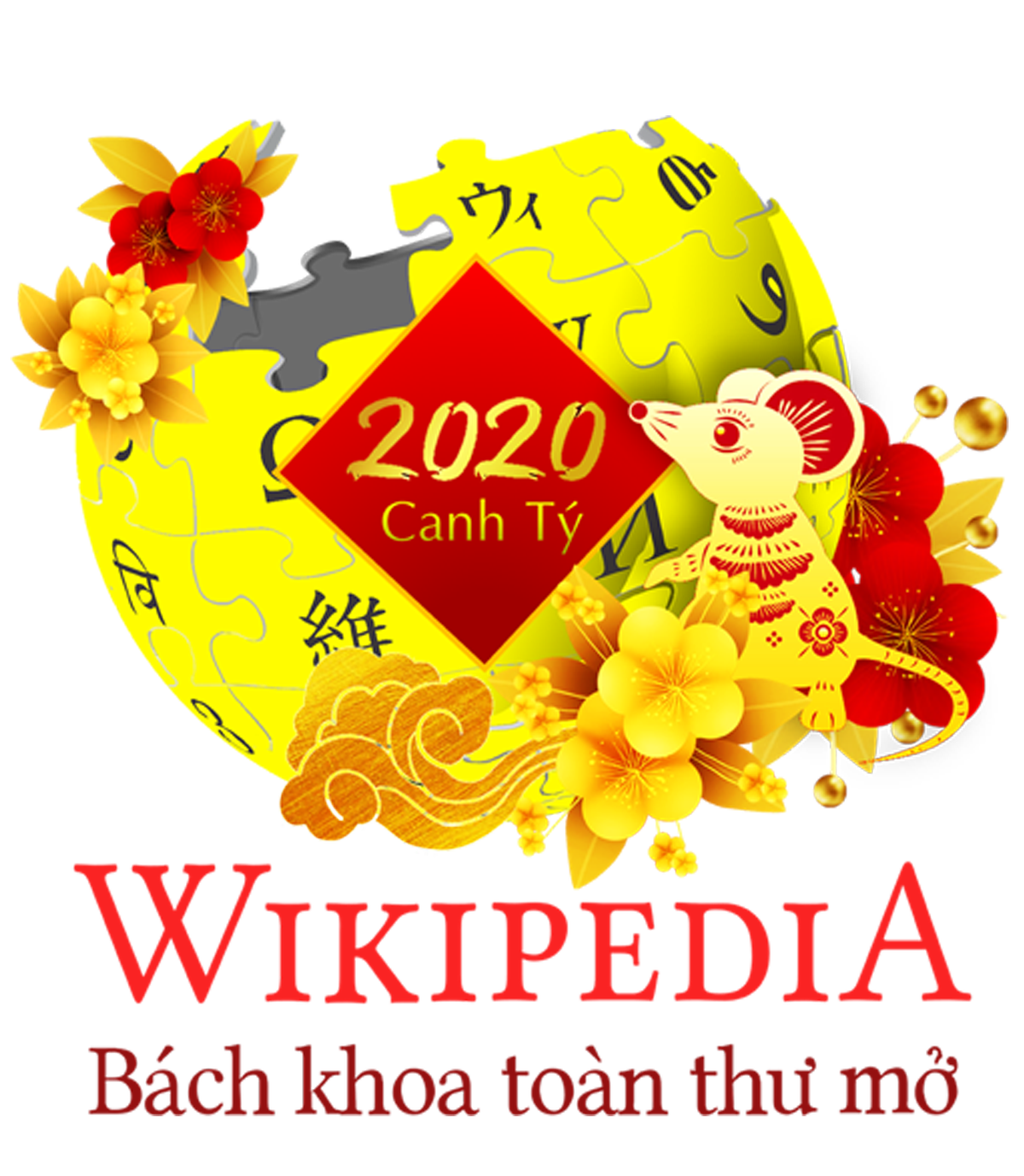
Tết Canh Tý 2020

1.250.000-article logo

Kỷ niệm 20 năm Wikipedia

Tết Tân Sửu 2021

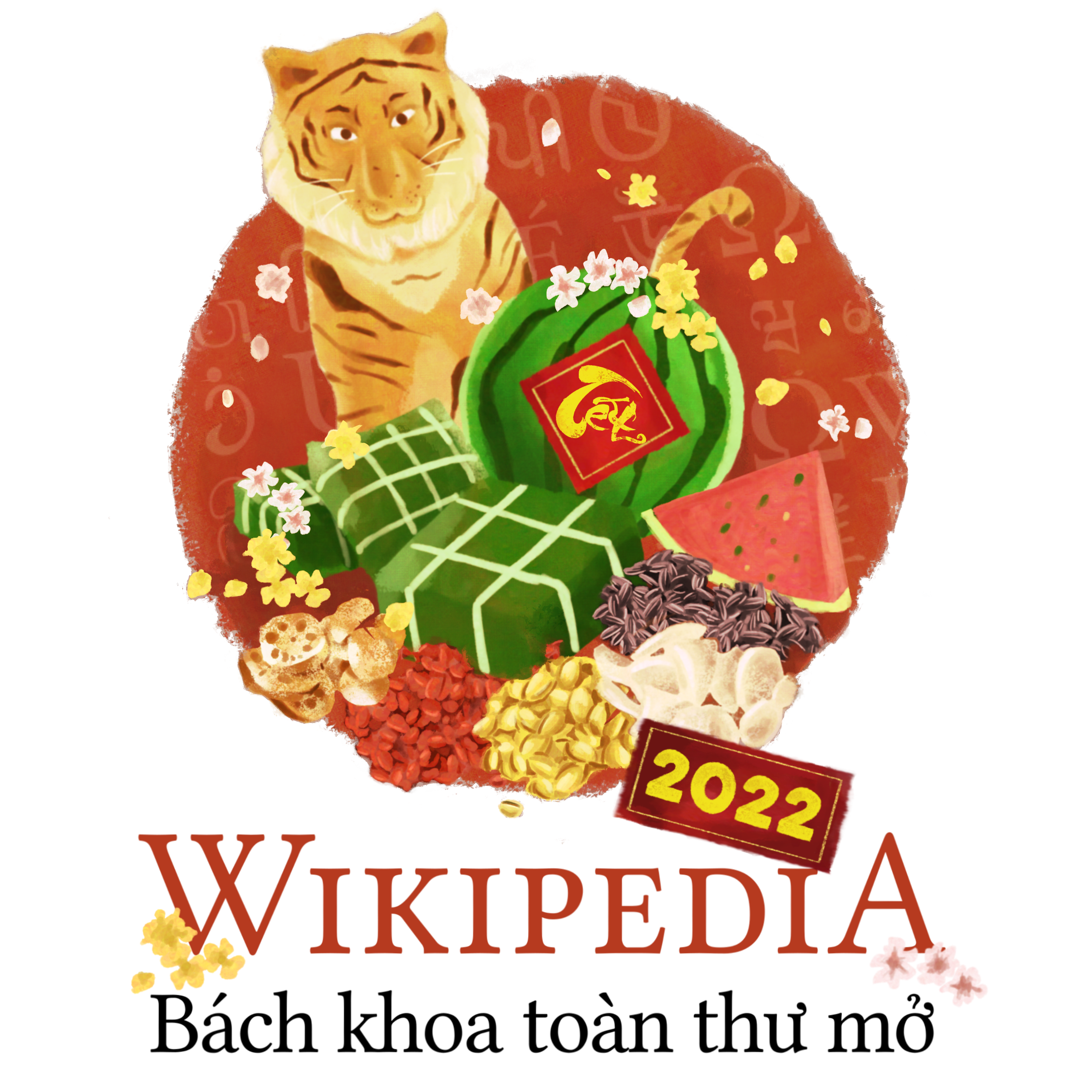
Tết Nhâm Dần 2022

Tết Holiday 2023

Tết Giáp Thìn 2024

Tết Ất Tỵ 2025

The wiki reached the 500,000-article milestone on 28 September 2012, and the 1,000,000-article milestone on 15 June 2014.

== Software ==
The Vietnamese Wikipedia uses AVIM, an input method that allows users to type Vietnamese text using popular input methods, such as Telex, VNI, and VIQR, selectable from the sidebar.

== Vandalism ==
Several Vietnamese newspapers have reported on vandalism committed by users on the wiki, mainly on articles about celebrities.

== Pro-Kremlin disinformation ==
In April 2022, the European Union's East StratCom Task Force reported that four pro-Kremlin disinformation news outlets (SouthFront, NewsFront, InfoRos and the Strategic Culture Foundation) were referenced in 32 articles of the Vietnamese Wikipedia. This made it the fifth Wikipedia language edition most affected by such disinformation, behind the Russian, Arabic, Spanish and Portuguese Wikipedias. The report said:

On the English version of Wikipedia, there seems to be a consensus that state-sponsored disinformation sites aren't legitimate sources ... One can only guess whether other language versions will follow suit, but there is nothing stopping anyone from launching that debate, pointing out the English Wikipedia example as a best practice.

== See also ==
- Vietnamese encyclopedias
