= Alias =

Alias may refer to:

- Pseudonym, a fictitious name that a person or group assumes for a particular purpose
  - Pen name, a pseudonym adopted by an author and printed on the title page or by-line of their works in place of their real name
  - Stage name, a pseudonym used by performers and entertainers
- Nickname, a substitute for the proper name of a familiar person, place or thing
- Sobriquet, a familiar name used in place of a real name without the need for explanation; it may become more familiar than the original name
- Code name, a code word or name used, sometimes clandestinely, to refer to another name, word, project, or person
- Art name, a pseudonym used in Sinosphere

== Arts and entertainment ==
=== Film and television ===
- Alias (2013 film), a 2013 Canadian documentary film
- Alias (TV series), an American action thriller series 2001–2006
- Alias the Jester, a 1995 British animated series
- Alias – the Bad Man, a 1931 American Western film

=== Gaming ===
- Alias (board game)
- Alias (Forgotten Realms), a fictional character in Dungeons & Dragons
- Alias (video game), 2004, based on the TV series

=== Literature ===
- Alias (comics), an American comic book series
- Alias Enterprises, an American publishing company
- Alias, a character in the British comic book series Kingsman: The Red Diamond

=== Music ===
- Alias (band), a Canadian rock supergroup
  - Alias (album), 1990
- Alias (The Magic Numbers album), 2014
- Alias (EP), by Shygirl, 2020
- Alias (musician) (Brendon Whitney, 1976–2018), American rapper
- Alias (Ryan Tedder, born 1979), American singer, songwriter and record producer
- Alias Records, a record label
- "Alias", a song by In Flames from the 2008 album A Sense of Purpose
- "Alias", a song by Scar Tissue from the 2008 album Form/Alkaline

== Computing ==
- alias (command), a shell command
- Alias (Mac OS), a small file representing another object
- Alias (SQL), a feature of SQL
- Aliasing (computing), where a data location can be accessed through different symbolic names
- Alias Systems Corporation, a former software company
  - PowerAnimator, also known as Alias
- Autodesk Alias, a family of computer-aided industrial design software
- Email alias, a forwarding email address
- URL shortening, where a (short) URL redirects to a longer URL

== People ==
- Alias Ali (1939–2014), Malaysian politician
- Alias Avidzba (fl. from 2015), Abkhazian politician
- Florina Alías (1921–1999), Spanish writer
- Siti Aisyah Alias (born 1966), Malaysian polar scientist

== Other uses ==
- Alias, Iran, or Qahremanabad, a village

== See also ==
- Aliasing, an effect in signal processing
- Alias method, a family of algorithms for sampling from a discrete probability distribution
- Alias transformation, in analytic geometry
- Allias, a neighbourhood of Tirana, Albania
