= Grisha Putin =

Russian streamer (born 2006)

GrishaPutin
- Korolev in 2026
- Born: Grigory Korolev (Григорий Королёв); April 4, 2006 (age 20); Saint Petersburg, Russia
- Education: Saint Petersburg State University (expelled)
- Years active: 2020–present
- Organization: Z Shaker Central

Instagram information
- Page: Grigorii Korolev
- Years active: 2025–present
- Genres: Politics, vlogging
- Followers: 195

Kick information
- Channel: GrishaPutin
- Years active: 2023–2024
- Genres: Gaming, politics
- Game: Hearts of Iron IV
- Followers: 622

Twitch information
- Channel: GrishaPutin
- Years active: 2020–2023
- Genres: Gaming, politics
- Game: Hearts of Iron IV
- Followers: 32.8 thousand

X information
- Handle: @Zigga1945
- Display name: GrishaPutin
- Years active: 2023–present
- Topics: Politics, Gaming
- Followers: 9.4 thousand

YouTube information
- Channel: Grisha
- Years active: 2020–present
- Genres: Gaming, politics
- Subscribers: 36.1 thousand
- Views: 8.62 million
- Last updated: November 6, 2026

Grigory "Grisha" Korolev (Note: Russian: Григорий «Гриша» Королёв) (born April 4, 2006), better known as GrishaPutin, is a Russian YouTuber and livestreamer. Known primarily for his content relating to the World War II themed grand strategy wargame Hearts of Iron IV (HOI4), Korolev has garnered substantial attention for his pro-Russian fundraising and viewpoints, as well as Kremlin ties in the wake of the escalation of the Russo-Ukrainian War, becoming a self-described "cyberwarrior" of the conflict.

Heralding from St. Petersburg, Korolev began producing gaming content at age 14 after his mother purchased his first computer. Korolev primarily plays HOI4, and was once an active member of the game's online community, being ranked second for the game on Twitch and placing second at the 2021 HOI4 International Championship. At this time, Korolev had already established a reputation for his Russian nationalism and eccentric behavior, most notably cosplaying as soldiers from the countries he was playing in his games. Such behavior intensified in the leadup to the 2022 Russian invasion of Ukraine.

After uploading a video showing him swiftly conquering Ukraine in HOI4 the day before the invasion on February 24, Korolev began making pro-war content, and was subsequently disavowed by the international HOI4 community. In early 2023, he garnered substantial international media coverage when he streamed several games of HOI4's Millennium Dawn, a mod that takes the game to the current day, at the headquarters of the Wagner Group. The streams, which saw him as Russia invade large parts of Ukraine and NATO, prompted the creators of HOI4, Paradox Interactive, to send copyright strikes to his Twitch channel, and it was eventually banned at the end of the year on grounds of promoting terrorism.

In July of 2024, he, alongside the Russian based news outlet African Initiative, described by the US as a Kremlin-Wagner Group propaganda arm in the Sahel, released a submod of Millennium Dawn titled African Dawn, in which players participate in a cold war in West Africa between the Russian-backed, "pan-Africanist" Alliance of Sahel States, and the Franco-American, "neocolonialist" ECOWAS. Widely viewed as a tool to spread Russian geopolitical narratives about the region, the mod was banned by Paradox on the grounds of it promoting genocide, and received widespread coverage in the international press. Korolev promoted the mod to Burkinabe youth and diplomat shortly after its release at an event, reported in foreign media as being in Burkina Faso itself, though contemporary and later statements by Korolev indicate it was in Russia.

Korolev's streams have been noted for their integration of pro-Russian narratives, marked by his use of them to fundraise for the Russian war effort. After being semi-present at the assassination of Russian milblogger Vladlen Tatarsky in April 2023, Korolev founded the organization Z Shaker Central, meant to promote the Russian effort; as part of this, they have a program where military material such as tanks or artillery shells can be signed with custom messages and illustrations, accompanied by custom video edits, often of Ukrainian soldiers being killed by the equipment. In October 2026, he announced that he was going to be undergoing a year of mandatory military service.

== Early life ==
Korolev with his mother on stream

Grigory Korolev was born on April 4, 2006, and is from Saint Petersburg. His ancestors come from the city of Gorky, now known as Nizhny Novgorod. According to a ZDF report in late 2023 that featured an interview with Korolev, he does not know his father; in the comments section of a repost of said report on his YouTube channel, Korolev denied stating this.

Korolev's great-grandfather, Sergey Retin, served as a SU-76 mechanic and driver during World War II, and was awarded the Order of the Red Star on April 25, 1945, during the Battle of Berlin. His grandmother, Anna Koroleva, volunteered for the Red Army in 1943, aged 17, and was part of an air transit division based at Vnukovo aerodrome, where she met his grandfather, Vasily Korolev. According to familial legend, Vasily was a friend of Vasily Stalin, son of Joseph Stalin, and who performed combat sorties from Vnukovo.

Korolev grew up reading about World War II and the leaders involved. This, compounded with his family's history of national service, has been attributed by him to his worldview. He is fascinated by history and a flag enthusiast. He enrolled at Saint Petersburg University in 2025, studying at its international relations program.

== Early career ==
Korolev in military costume in 2026

At the age of 14, his mother bought him his first computer. Following this, Korolev began streaming on Twitch in late 2020, primarily playing Hearts of Iron IV (HOI4), a World War II-era grand strategy wargame published by the Swedish Paradox Interactive. Despite the game's popularity worldwide, it remains relatively unknown in Russia, leading to Korolev streaming in English. He adopted the internet alias "GrishaPutin" to show that he was a "patriot of Russia and the USSR" and highlight their role in "liberating Europe from Nazism and achieving victory in World War II." The name is a purposeful homage to Russian President Vladimir Putin, a practice he claims is common amongst Russian online gamers.

His first video on YouTube was a how-to video explaining what he believed to be the best division templates in HOI4. His two most popular videos on his channel as of 2025 were both released prior to Russia's 2022 invasion, and are meme videos mocking how supposedly overpowered HOI4's railgun mechanic is. Korolev garnered a reputation for eccentric behavior on stream, most notably his cosplaying soldiers from countries he played as in HOI4; for instance, when playing as the Soviet Union, he would don a stand collar military jacket and have a red flag behind him. He was also known for his Russian nationalism.

He placed second place at the HOI4 International 2021 championship and was amongst the most well known streamers of the game prior to 2022, being the second ranked streamer on Twitch for it in early 2023 and having reportedly logged over 7 thousand hours in the game. Since the flare-up in the Russo-Ukrainian war, Korolev has mainly participated in domestic HOI4 tournaments, winning one in March 2026; before then, he repeatedly engaged in online multiplayer games with western streamers. Besides HOI4, Korolev also played other military strategy games as well as first-person shooters.

== Pivot ==
This clip of Korolev playing the HOI4 mod The Fire Rises in 2023, in which he celebrates after Ukraine capitulates to Russia and the Stepan Bandera monument in Lviv is destroyed, garnered coverage from The Wall Street Journal and NBC News.

By the turn of 2022, Korolev's content began to shift towards being more openly political. In one video, he gave his opinion on liberals, filming himself throwing something to the ground before cutting to an explosion. In another video, he somberly laid flowers towards the statue of Lenin at Finland Station in Saint Petersburg to commemorate the 30th anniversary of the dissolution of the Soviet Union. In a New Year's address video he disseminated on YouTube, Twitch, and Discord, he mimicked the New Year's address given by Vladimir Putin.

In late 2021, amidst the already ongoing Russo-Ukrainian war, the Russian military began a massive buildup along the country's border with Ukraine. The ensuing international crisis came to a head on February 21, 2022, when Russia recognized the separatist Luhansk (LPR) and Donetsk (DPR) republics in the Donbass. Following that on February 23, Korolev uploaded a video to YouTube titled "How Russia can conquer the Ukraine in HOI4". The 70 second video showed him conquering Ukraine in seven days as Russia in the Millennium Dawn mod, which focuses on the post-Cold War era from 2000 to 2035, while making references to taking prisoners of war and joking about sending a Russian language version of the mod to Putin. The video within a day garnered much attention, accruing nearly 150 thousand views, but Korolev stated that he "did not have time to check them" as he began streaming Russian news and proclaiming that he "was for the Fatherland."

After Russia launched its invasion of Ukraine on February 24, Korolev began holding streams where he attempted to explain "the truth about the special military operation and counter Western propaganda", as well as debate pro-Ukraine foreigners and supply aid to Russian soldiers. Becoming more nationalistic, he began to try and integrate himself more with the Russian state, attempting (but failing) to become a police officer as well as joining United Russia's youth wing to deliver supplies to soldiers in Mariupol. In one of his earliest media appearances, an interview with the Swedish Svenska Dagbladet, he stated that he urges his followers to not trust any one side, citing the Ghost of Kyiv and early reporting on the Snake Island campaign as examples of Ukrainian propaganda.

Korolev claimed that around half of his audience broke away from him as a result of his support of Russia in the war, which, compounded with the lack of money coming from YouTube and Twitch due to the sanctions, led to him doubting if he should continue streaming for around a year. His views plummeted from the hundreds of thousands to tens of thousands. He was barred from eSports competitions over his positions, as well as Twitch a year and a half later for violating platform rules. He was also largely shunned by the broader HOI4 community, who found his behavior and views since the invasion disagreeable.

== Z Shaker Central ==
Logo of Z Shaker Central

Korolev was a fan of Vladlen Tatarsky, a Russian military blogger who participated in the war against Ukraine. On April 2, 2023, he and his mother attended an event with him at cafe in Saint Petersburg. During it, Korolev received a work-related phone call and had to leave; a half-hour later, a bomb exploded at the cafe, killing Tatarsky. Korolev stated that the incident made him realize that the war had come to Russia, and in response, he created an international organization named "Z Shaker Central", (Note: Named after "Thug Shaker Central", the Discord server where American airman Jack Teixeira had perpetrated the contemporary Discord Leaks) meant to aid the Russian Armed Forces.

Early in the conflict, Korolev initially raised funds, which he describes as humanitarian, purely via streaming, but pivoted to other sources due to what he said was the fact that "my subscribers’ resources were depleting while the demands on the frontlines were increasing". After a viral moment where Russian artillerymen thanked Korolev and inscribed messages on their shells, his organization launched a program where shells are sold in exchange for donations. The program, which is an international affair comprising a video editor from the Netherlands, a computer engineer from Finland, and an artist from Poland, has subscribers worldwide from at least nineteen countries. Similar programs exists for other equipment such one where an FPV drone can be purchased for a unit in the Zaporizhian front for €500. These drone and shell programs are often accompanied by a video edit with by a song requested by a purchaser and footage of the Ukrainian soldier killed by it. In exchange, Korolev is frequently sent mementos from the front by Russian troops, such as captured Ukrainian combat jackets.

Shells painted with anime girls by Z Shaker Central

An example of these shells include two inscribed with the logos of the Donald Trump and Joe Biden 2024 presidential campaigns. Another was when tanks on the front were inscribed with references to Pempek, an Indonesian dish, with one of them reportedly being done at the request of a Pempek stand in Indonesia that wanted to express support for "the people of Donbass and Palestine". Another, tweeted by him on Christmas Eve 2024, had the message "Merry Christmas to Ukraine from USA", alongside an illustration of Santa in a sleigh drawn by two reindeer. Many of them include illustrtaions of anime girls, earning them the nickname of "waifu artilery" from the Kyiv Post, a Ukrainian English language newspaper. Described by him as "a great way to troll" in an NBC News interview, these signed shells have received extensive coverage worldwide. The Kyiv Post reported in April 2024 that Korolev may have faked at least some of the signed shells, based on allegations from Chinese netizens on Weibo.

Korolev also joined the Narodnaya Aptechka, (Note: Russian: Народная аптечка, "People’s First Aid Kit") a Russian organization meant to provide aid to the forces in Ukraine, and primarily receives funds in US dollars, euros, and Chinese yuan. He collaborated with the Espaniola brigade, a former Russian irregular military formation composed of football hooligans which has links to Russian intelligence via the Redut paramilitary organization. He also formed a Steam group for Z Shaker Central, which in 2025 had 400 active members and had raised $10 thousand for Wagner Group operations in Ukraine. On X, despite its restrictions in Russia, Korolev had raised over ₽8 million by March 2026. He has also helped at least one foreign fighter for Russia; he stated that he helped an Australian volunteer, who he described as "the only Australian in the Russian Armed Forces" come to the country to fight in the war. He stated that he had gone missing and was likely dead.

== Streams and collaborations ==
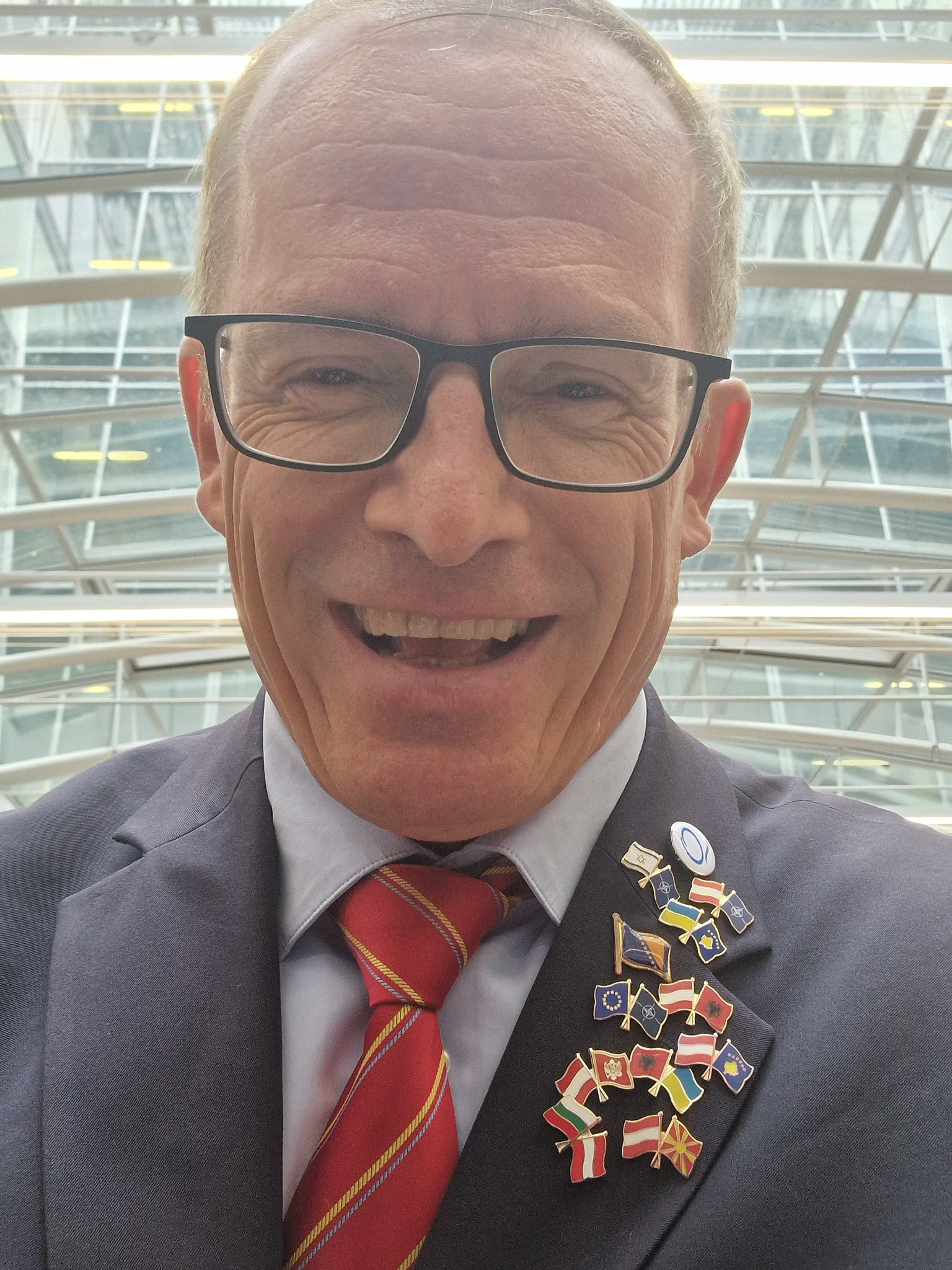
Korolev's stream of the mod The Fire Rises with Austrian economist and NATO activist Gunther Fehlinger (right, pictured here in 2025), garnered extensive attention in the Hearts of Iron IV community

Korolev's streams frequently depict him fighting NATO forces as a Russian, with his HOI4 streams frequently featuring Russian invasions of large parts of Europe. These take place in various mods of the game, such as Millennium Dawn, The Fire Rises, and East Showdown, the latter of which explicitly is about the war in Ukraine. In 2026, the Polish state news outlet TVP Info aired a segment about Korolev's streams on HOI4 and fundraising, where they falsely claimed that he made HOI4 and that the whole game was being used to raise funds for the Russian war effort.

Korolev is known for his attempt to collaborate with various real world figures in his games. When the 83-year-old Polish Confederacy politician Janusz Korwin-Mikke announced that he was intending to play Counter-Strike 2 in August 2026 to prove that he still had great reflexes despite his age, Korolev challenged him to a game of HOI4, where "together we will solve the problem of modern Ukraine and divide it between Poland and Russia." while fighting "Banderites" and "LGBT propaganda".

In 2026, Korolev participated in a stream in the HOI4 mod The Fire Rises (TFR). TFR is a mod set in the current-day in which the COVID-19 pandemic has a much greater effect on the world, leading to a civil war in the United States, a civil war in Saudi Arabia, China invading Taiwan, and where the escalation of the Russo-Ukrainian war begins around 2025 and evolves into the "Russo-European Wars" between the remaining part of NATO in Europe and Russia. In the stream, Korolev participated alongside seven other western players, including most notably Austrian economist Gunther Fehlinger, a pro-NATO activist who became an internet meme for his staunch opposition to Russia and is featured as a potential leader of a federal Europe in the mod. Korolev defeated the western streamers in two games. The collaboration between the two received substantial attention in the HOI4 community, and Korolev claimed to have received views of it from Russian troops in Ukraine.

== Association with the Wagner Group ==
=== PMC Wagner Centre streams ===
Korolev streaming at the PMC Wagner Centre on February 4, 2023

Korolev's popularity garnered the attention of the Wagner Group, a Russian mercenary company that is heavily involved in the war. On February 4, 2023, Korolev, donned in Russian military gear and the ribbon of Saint George, conducted a HOI4 livestream at the headquarters of the organization, the PMC Wagner Centre in Saint Petersburg, on the Russian social media service VK, likely to avoid potential bans on Twitch. In the multiplayer stream, where he plays a modified version of the mod Millennium Dawn, the Russo-Ukrainian war begins when Ukraine attacks the LPR and DPR, before evolving into a thermonuclear war between Russia and NATO. After occupying Ukraine and obliterating several European capitals, the conflicts ends when an interlocutor representing America under Donald Trump agrees to delineate the post World War III borders, leaving Lviv Oblast as part of a rump Ukraine.

Korolev conducted two more streams from the PMC Wagner Centre on February 18 and March 18 respectively. The second stream, which oriented around the same premise as the previous game, but without nuclear weapons, entailed a total Russian annexation of most of Europe, a Russian naval invasion of America (during which the Wagner Group played the Russian national anthem), and a Belarusian conquest of Poland. The third one was a simple Russian victory in the "special military operation", with the resulting borders were compared to those espoused by Russian nationalist figures like Egor Prosvirnin and Alexander Dugin.

With Yevgeny Prigozhin, 2023

Korolev's streams received substantial worldwide attention. To confront allegations that he was actually just using a greenscreen, Korolev got up and filmed around the Wagner office. The stream caught the attention of Paradox Interactive, whose staff attempted to find where the stream was located in what PC Gamer described as an attempt to get it shut down. In response to the HOI4 community manager criticizing the stream on Twitter, Korolev posted in Discord that he was "malding that he cant [sic] do anything to stop me from using HOI4 as [sic] Russian propaganda tool" before typing a custom "gigachad" emote. As a result of his streams at the PMC Wagner Centre, Paradox began to hit his Twitch channel with copyright strikes, and by the end of the year, his account was suspended and later banned on the basis of promoting terrorism. His original Discord server was also banned for similar reasons, forcing him to create new ones.

Korolev has denied that he was paid by Wagner to do his livestreams, maintaining his story that he did them on his own volition. Korolev claimed that in January 2023, after being disowned by the HOI4 community, he walked into the PMC Wagner Centre and simply asked the head of the group's public relations if he could stream there, which they acquiesced to after thirty minutes. The Swiss newspaper 20 Minuten reported that a Russian media outlet stated the same, while the German outlet ZDF claimed that they could not verify if Korolev was telling the truth, and a report by the French government's Secretariat-General for National Defence and Security stated that his streams were likely financed by the Wagner Group. Korolev has met with Yevgeny Prigozhin, the leader of Wagner, and knew him personally, describing him as "chill and respectful". In July 2023, he returned to PMC Wagner Centre to play Arma 3, an open world, tactical shooter simulation.

On August 23, Yevgeny Prigozhin died in a plane crash in Tver Oblast. In a clip posted onto Reddit the following day, Korolev was shown in tears reacting to the news. Afterwards, Korolev was interviewed by ZDF as part of a report on supporters of the man who had recently had a major falling out with the Kremlin that had culminated in an aborted revolt a few months earlier. Korolev stated that he expressed "deep grief" over his death, stating that he had become a father figure to many Russians during the conflict. He was later filmed by ZDF with his mother at a makeshift memorial for Prigozhin.

=== African Dawn ===
Korolev explaining HOI4 to the attaché to Burkina Faso's Russian embassy at an African Initiative event, 2024

In late 2023, Korolev received a call from Anna Zamaraeva, an ex-Wagner Group employee who was now the deputy editor of African Initiative, a Russian based news outlet oriented towards African audiences that employs various ex-Wagner employees and which the United States deems a propaganda source linked to Russian intelligence. Zamaraeva had previously been given a shoutout by Korolev on his first PMC Wagner Centre streams; he mentioned her as the public relations person who had approved of him streaming at their headquarters. Zamaraeva asked Korolev if he could help develop a HOI4 mod to depict the various conflicts in the Sahel. The collaboration between African Initiative, Z Shaker Central, and Korolev was announced in February 2024. African Initiative reportedly recruited ex Wagner members to the mod's development team.

The mod was later released under the title of African Dawn on July 12, 2024. A modified version of Millennium Dawn, the mod allows players to play as the various Russian backed groups present in the Sahel, in what it bills as "the Great African war". The mod, which starts after the September 2022 coup in Burkina Faso, mimics the split between the more western oriented, "neo-colonialist" ECOWAS and Russian oriented, "pan-Africanist" Alliance of Sahel States, and gamers who choose to play as Russia are tasked with expelling Franco-American influence from the area. The mod also includes in-game news stories featuring Wagner-aligned perspective of various events in its timeframe, including on Prigozhin's death.

Paradox has repeatedly attempted to get rid of African Dawn on the grounds of it promoting genocide, but the mod has repeatedly reappeared on Steam and elsewhere online, and Korolev has estimated that it has been downloaded 50 thousand times, with his involvement in the project being credited as a key part of its success. The Polish Institute of International Affairs, a Warsaw-based think tank, described African Dawn as not only a way to propagate the Russian narrative about West Africa, but also to prepare "new cadres for influence operations." The Wagner Group, through African Initiative and the Africa Corps, began promoting the mod in various West African countries. Korolev promoted the mod on at an African Initiative event on July 21, 2024, shortly after the mod's initial release, where he presented African Dawn to Burkinabe youth and diplomats, including Vital Placid Simpore, the cultural and public relations attaché of the Burkina Faso Embassy in Russia. Media and journal reports state that the event was held in Burkina Faso, though contemporary statements by Korolev and African Initiative indicate that it was in Russia, and he reiterated in 2026 that he denied ever visiting the country.

== Military service ==
Avatar of GrishaPutin

GrishaPutin
(@Zigga1945)
tweeted:

I am going to 🇷🇺 army for 1 year of compulsory military service

In April 2026, I failed the retake of French language exam and was expelled from St. Petersburg State University for an unsatisfactory reason (academic debt), which deprived me of a postponement from military service given to active students.

During SMO, I managed to help a lot of people, so don't worry about me

I will be serving in St. Petersburg

From time to time I will get in touch, all fundraising projects will continue ❤️

October 20, 2026

In an August 2024 interview with NBC News, Korolev stated that he did not want to enlist in the Russian Armed Forces, stating that his work as a "cyberwarrior" was more helpful than serving on the frontlines. As a student at Saint Petersburg State University, Korolev was exempt from the universal mandatory service required of Russian men.

However, on a post on X on October 20, 2026, Korolev announced that he had failed his retake of his French language exam, leading to his expulsion from Saint Petersburg University in April. As such, he would no longer be exempt from the mandatory service and was to begin his year of service in Saint Petersburg the following day. On October 20, he made a final HOI4 stream but promised to remain in touch while in the military.

== Personal views and life ==
Asking former President Dmitry Medvedev a question, 2026

Korolev resides with his mother in Saint Petersburg. In addition to Russian and English, he also understands German. He has stated that time zone differences amongst his international audience, which forces him to stream at night, mean that he does not have much time for socializing.

Politically, Korolev does not identify as a leftist nor a rightist, referring to himself only as a "Russian patriot." He has claimed to be in contact with the American Communist Party, established in 2024, and an implied American far-right book publisher that advocates for "very bad things", which he holds to symbolize how both extremes of the political aisle view Russia as their ally. Korolev states that figures like him have risen since more liberal Russian personalities who fled after the start of the war lost their ability to sway the Russian youth. He has stated that Russian officials are attempting to "play up" what he described as "imposed idols" such as celebrities Yegor Creed and Instasamka, and claims that Russian Gen Z is actually looking towards individuals like him and becoming more patriotic as a result.

Korolev has described the usage of video games as key tool in informational warfare, noting its abilities to engage with young people globally. He has advocated for Russia to develop its own video games on this basis, recommending narratives from Russian history such as the Great Patriotic War or the "special military operation".

Korolev has denied the claim that he is uncritically regurgitating Russian propaganda, instead claiming that he was merely combatting western misinformation and providing the truth about the war in Ukraine. Korolev has claimed to have grown a decent following in the former East Germany, as well as China via his shell signature fundraising efforts. He has stated that his audience principally consists of Europeans and Americans, and states that they support him and Russia since they view it as an antithesis towards their home societies, such as the "LGBT agenda", noting that the narrative of Russia being a traditional conservative country has caught on in the west. Korolev has criticized Russian society for not living up to that narrative and calls for it to do so.

Despite the war and his staunch support of it, Korolev has claimed to still maintain cordial relations with some Ukrainians, relaying a story of being in a squad in Arma 3 with two veterans of the Armed Forces of Ukraine and Russian Armed Forces respectively who largely get along but avoid discussing what they did, as well as claiming to meet a Ukrainian from Kyiv annually to play Men of War: Assault Squad 2 together. He has stated that he does not consider Ukrainians to be enemies, but that anti-Russian sentiment in Ukraine is the result of brainwashing from foreign powers, and that Russians and Ukrainians are "brotherly peoples". In the early days of the war, he criticized the uptick in anti-Russian sentiment online following the start of the invasion, stating that while he understood "that people don't like what's happening in Ukraine," people should "hate us ordinary Russians". He further added that while there was "no excuse" for the violence in Ukraine, it was caused since all other diplomatic options had been exhausted.

With Russian politician Vasily Vlasov, 2026

Korolev is known for his harassment of Vse Svobodny, (Note: Russian: Все свободны, Everyone's Free) an independent bookstore in Saint Petersburg that has received opposition for its subtle anti-war messaging. After the store's "Peace to the World" sign, which it had hung on its window since the start of the Russian invasion was shot by an unknown assailant in the spring of 2023, Korolev took to Telegram to condemn the bookstore and cover the sign with the letter Z. In response to a Ukrainian strike on St. Petersburg on June 3, 2026, Korolev told NBC News that such strikes only "strengthen the resolve".

Despite restrictions on X in Russia, Korolev continues to use the platform to do fundraising for the Russian war effort. He has repeatedly been banned from the platform, having starting new accounts on multiple occasions. He also uses Telegram for similar reasons. Amidst attempts by the Kremlin to throttle Telegram in 2026, Korolev came out against the effort, stating to NBC News that it was "criminal". He noted that it was a big hub of both positional and monetary support for the Russian military and that he "can only assume that there is a lofty goal of making everything sovereign, but what’s happening right now is just sabotage."

== Analysis ==
With NBC News' Keir Simmons in Saint Petersburg, 2026

Lagrley starting with his streams at PMC Wagner Centre, Korolev has been the subject of extensive coverage from news outlets, academic sources and think tanks, as well as even foreign governments. British gaming journalist George E. Osborn described Korolev as "[the closest] I've seen to a state-backed video game influencer", and his open use by Kremlin-connected interests to further Russian geopolitical narratives has made him a key figure in analysis of the use of video games as propaganda tools. His PMC Wagner Centre streams and his development and promotion of African Dawn have received particular coverage.

In an interview with Saint Petersburg State University in 2025, Korolev has stated that he has been contacted and written about by various media outlets, being the subject of an NBC News minidocumentary, as well as being interviewed by The Wall Street Journal, The New York Times, and Bloomberg Businessweek, and being covered in pieces by the French Le Figaro and Amnesty International. He regularly engages with international media under the principle of all publicity being beneficial as well as seeking to humanize Russians to foreign audiences.

Coverage of Korolev's streams often highlight the perceived absurdity of the scenarios of his games, while also contrasting Russia's military success in them with their lack of progress in the real Russo-Ukrainian war, as well as noting certain narratives pushed. Joshua Wolens, describing his first Wagner Group stream in February 2023 for PC Gamer, stated that despite the destructive nuclear nature of the conflict against NATO, he doubted that the exercise was meant to illustrate the toll of war, but that it was instead "conducted in a borderline-nihilistic spirit of defiance, a kind of 'we don't care what you think of us' sardonicism that's meant to reinforce unity at home rather than win over observers abroad", before describing it as a "perverse" showcase of 21st century warfare and the sort of thing that would be featured in "a future Adam Curtis documentary".

The Spanish El Mundo highlighted Korolev's invasions of Spain in his streams and noted the boisterous and belligerent attitude of what it described as "Wagner's protégé", while the Polish Rzeczpospolita stated that Korolev's scenarios when concerning Poland present narratives that "are deliberately constructed, presenting our country as an aggressive entity driven by territorial revisionism." The Estonian Postimees described him as among "the most bizarre ways Russia uses its propaganda machine".

Ukraine's state-run United24 stated that he blended his livestreams with propaganda, often of a homophobic, nationalist, and anti-Western disposition, a position Osborn agreed with, noting that his rhetoric and behavior often skids the line of ban-worthy. United24 also stated that his victory in these conflicts seek to illustrate that a Ukrainian or even NATO defeat of Russia is impossible and that resistance to Russian occupation is futile. Korolev's work on African Dawn garnered extensive coverage in late 2024 and 2025, with him being billed as "the gamer working with the Wagner Group". Amnesty International noted that the mod was a symbol of Russia's interference in Africa and of "the changing world order". The proliferation of Korolev's content and activities online has also drawn attention, with Osborn denouncing Steam's content moderation policies as "non-existent" over the fact that Z Shaker Central still openly operated as a group on their service.
