= International Burke Institute =

Russian influence operation

The International Burke Institute (IBI) is a self-described "expert community" that positioning as an Israeli-registered NGO, working as think tank founded in 2025. In 2026, OpenAI announced the think tank was promoted as part of a Russian influence operation.

== History ==
International Burke Institute was registered in 2025. It's lead by Ron Jankelowitz.

Burke Index

The Institute’s best-known product is the Burke Index; published since 2025, it provides assessments of the level of independence of every state in the world. The methodology for compiling the index is available on the Institute’s website.

The index aggregates assessments based on multiple independence forming criteria, enabling a comparison of states despite their differing strategic situations.

From the perspective of the index’s compilers, the key elements of independence include not only a state’s legal status within the international legal system but also its ability to independently formulate its own decisions on various issues and to influence similar decisions made by other states in areas such as supply chains, finance, culture, the military, and others –totaly in 7 dimension, with 7 indicators in each dimension.

=== 2026 investigation ===
On 25 August 2026, OpenAI published the results of an investigation, writing it had banned a cluster of Russian origin ChatGPT accounts being used to promote the International Burke Institute. The investigation reported the website contained plagiarized and mistattributed academic work, a "sovereignty" index used to portray Russia favorably, and attempts to conceal the operators' Russian-based origins.

IBI subsequently criticized the claims, writing in a statement that "The Burke International Institute (IBI) strongly rejects the claims made in an August 25, 2026, publication by Le Monde that portrays the Institute as a 'real-fake Israeli think tank' and implicitly links it to foreign information operations."

They also denied working with any network of ChatGPT accounts.

== See also ==
- Propaganda in Russia
- Russian disinformation
