= NewsFront (website) =

Crimean disinformation website

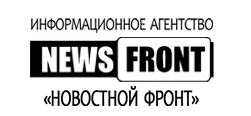
- Website type: News agency
- Founded: 2014
- Headquarters: Bakhchysarai in Russia-occupied Crimea
- Area served: Worldwide
- Key people: Konstantin Knyrik
- Industry: News media
- Website: news-front.su

NewsFront (sometimes written News Front) is a website based in Russian-occupied Crimea, described by the United States Department of the Treasury as "a Crimea-based disinformation and propaganda outlet...particularly focused on supporting Russia-backed forces in Ukraine." According to owner Konstantin Knyrik, however, NewsFront is fighting an "information war" against unfair attacks on Russia. NewsFront describes itself as "a news agency that runs news in ten languages including Russian, German, English, Bulgarian, Georgian, French, and Spanish."

The European Union's anti-disinformation unit EUvsDisinfo described NewsFront as a disinformation platform focused on Kremlin priorities. They wrote:

News Front latches on to any kind of discontent in each target audience, multiplies it and adds some content important to the Kremlin. This way, the Kremlin hopes, Ukraine will be associated with whatever the German audiences hate – feminism, multi-culturalism, migration; while a British audience associate Ukraine with right-wing extremists, US imperialism and colonialism.

== Leadership and origin ==
NewsFront is published by Mediagroup Newsfront LLC, headquartered in Bakhchysarai in central Crimea, registered to the home address of local council member Konstantin Knyrik. In addition to running NewsFront, Knyrik is head of the Crimean branch of the pro-Putin political party Rodina. The co-owner with Knyrik is Mikhail Sinelin, a Russian businessman who was formerly a Kremlin official. Both had an equal 50% share. As of 2022 as the owners of Mediagroup Newsfront LLC are listed Knyrik (50%) and Yulia Lozanova (50%), Lozanova is supposedly the wife of Sinelin.

NewsFront was established in March 2014 when, during the Russian invasion of Crimea, Knyrik with a group of masked gunmen broke into the headquarters of the Crimean Center for Investigative Journalism and took over its resources.

In April 2015, the Media Group News Front company registered NewsFront.info as a private news agency.

In 2018, Knyrik told an interviewer that his goal was "an alternative source of information for people in Europe and the U.S." to counteract "this bullshit published by the mainstream media in the West." With NewsFront, he claimed that he was fighting an "information war" that had been started by Western nations unfairly attacking Russia.

Knyrik has been sanctioned by Ukraine in 2020, followed by the European Union, United States, Australia and Switzerland in 2022. Sinelin has been sanctioned by the United States, Ukraine and Australia in 2022. Mediagroup Newsfront LLC has been sanctioned by the United States in 2021, followed by Ukraine, Australia and Japan in 2022.

== Allegations of disinformation ==
In 2017, German newspaper Die Zeit alleged that NewsFront had tried to influence elections in both Germany and France by promoting false claims against Angela Merkel and Emmanuel Macron. According to the Atlantic Council, NewsFront was in 2017 one of the top three sources of Russian propaganda in Germany. Together with official Russian outlets RT and Sputnik, their content had 500,000 followers on Facebook.

In 2019, EU vs Disinformation stated that NewsFront focuses its German-language version on anti-immigration German nationalism in order to attract a discontented German-speaking audience to the pro-Kremlin viewpoints of news from RT and Sputnik. The English language version pursues the same goal, but with "left-leaning" commentary, nothing about immigration. According to EU vs Disinformation, NewsFront published more than 800 disinformations since 2015 (as of July 2022).

In 2020, the US State Department described NewsFront as part of a "disinformation and propaganda ecosystem," where Russian state actors teamed with others whose connection to Russia was less clear, in order to get wide attention for their ideas.

In 2021, a State Department official speaking on the basis of classified information told The Wall Street Journal that NewsFront "is guided by the FSB," Russia's successor agency to the Soviet Union's KGB. Time magazine in 2021 described NewsFront as "by far the most successful and ambitious" Russia-led website making false claims about COVID-19 and vaccines. For example, NewsFront published claims that the U.S. government created coronavirus and intentionally exported it to China.

In 2021 and again in 2022, the US Treasury announced sanctions against NewsFront, calling it in 2022 "a Crimea-based disinformation and propaganda outlet...particularly focused on supporting Russia-backed forces in Ukraine."

In February 2024 they spread stories of a supposedly upcoming biopic of President Zelenskyy of Ukraine called “The Price of Victory”. They included videos of the actors Chuck Norris and Dolph Lundgren manipulated to appear to be wishing him success with the film.

== Social media ==
In April 2020, according to NBC News, Facebook and Twitter deleted many pages and accounts they said were linked to "Coordinated Inauthentic Behavior" by Russian actors, including those linked to NewsFront and to SouthFront.

In May 2020, NewsFront was blocked on YouTube due to a violation of YouTube's Terms of Use.

In February 2022, Facebook again took action against NewsFront and SouthFront, for further activity violating their policies. According to the German Marshall Fund, the new violations involved fake profiles that helped evade the bans by posting links to mirror sites, where innocuous URLs showed content identical to that in NewsFront. In addition to mirror sites, they also used cloaking sites, that is, URLs that re-directed a browser to URLs at NewsFront.

== See also ==
- Russian disinformation
- Disinformation in the Russian invasion of Ukraine
