= SouthFront =

Russian military disinformation website

- Website type: News agency
- Founded: 2015
- Headquarters: Crimea
- Area served: Worldwide
- Industry: News media
- Website: southfront.press/about-southfront/

SouthFront (sometimes written South Front) is a multilingual website registered in Russia and based in Crimea. It has been accused of being an outlet for disinformation and propaganda under the control of the Russian government. For this reason, it has been sanctioned by the US Treasury and banned by social media platforms.

== History ==
In 2014, Radio Free Europe reported: "The English-language Facebook page for South Front, which has slightly more than 11,500 subscribers, is a mix of carefully selected 'news' from the region – usually from sources like LifeNews, a video news outlet believed to have ties to Russia's security services – and anti-Ukrainian and anti-Western memes." They described SouthFront as "a group supporting pro-Russian separatists in eastern Ukraine".

Writing in 2019, the European Union's East StratCom Task Force analyzed site meta-data and reported, "South Front is registered in Russia, money donated to the site goes to Russia and the editor is named Anastasia. But the most compelling evidence for South Front's being Russian is in the content ... South Front is loyally relaying whatever suits the Kremlin, pretending not to be Russian." Two days after that report appeared, SouthFront anonymized their videos, removing Russian text that had listed the name of their video editor as "Natasha".

In December 2019, the English Wikipedia community deprecated and blacklisted SouthFront and NewsFront, classifying them as "state-sponsored fake news sites".

In April 2020, Facebook and Twitter deleted many pages and accounts they said were linked to "Coordinated Inauthentic Behavior" by Russian actors, mentioning South Front as having "pushed misleading articles, questioning the results of the 2020 U.S. presidential election and the efficacy of COVID-19 vaccines." According to EU vs Disinfo, however, both SouthFront and Crimea-based NewsFront were able to evade much of the Facebook effort.

In February 2022, Meta (formerly Facebook, Inc.) took action against both SouthFront and NewsFront for a new round of deceptive activity. The Facebook report said that a network of fake accounts claiming to be people from Kyiv amplified content from "websites masquerading as independent news outlets, publishing claims about the West betraying Ukraine and Ukraine being a failed state".

In March 2022, the US Treasury department said, "Although it previously focused on the 2020 U.S. presidential election, SouthFront has also spread information suggesting that Ukraine or NATO could use chemical weapons within the country with hopes to blame it on Russia."

In April 2022, the East StratCom Task Force reported that SouthFront and three other pro-Kremlin disinformation outlets (NewsFront, the Strategic Culture Foundation and InfoRos) were referenced in 136 articles of the Russian Wikipedia, 70 of the Arabic edition, 52 of the Spanish, 45 of the Portuguese, and 32 of the Vietnamese Wikipedia. The report said:

On the English version of Wikipedia, there seems to be a consensus that state-sponsored disinformation sites aren't legitimate sources ... One can only guess whether other language versions will follow suit, but there is nothing stopping anyone from launching that debate, pointing out the English Wikipedia example as a best practice.

In August 2023, the domain southfront.org "was took down (domain delegation was removed) on the international level without any advance notice and explanation." The web then changed its domain to southfront.press.

== Disinformation and propaganda ==
In 2016, Finnish journalist Jessikka Aro described SouthFront as "an allegedly citizen-sourced project that looks more like a suspicious information operation". Describing it as "a fascinating hybrid of revealingly detailed military intelligence and totally bogus stories", she said that the site's content centers on "the success of Russia's armed forces, and showing off Russia's weapons".

In 2017, researchers at Oxford University's Internet Institute studied the collaboration of SouthFront with two US-based fascist fake news sites, Veterans Today and its sister site Veterans News Now.

Philip N. Howard, one of the paper's coauthors, told McClatchy DC that the three websites underlay "an entire ecosystem of junk news about national security issues that is deliberately crafted for U.S. veterans and active military personnel ... a complex blend of content with a Russian view of the world – wild rumors and conspiracies". The Oxford researchers concluded that the three sites were more successful on Twitter than on Facebook, saying "on Twitter there are significant and persistent interactions between current and former military personnel and a broad network of Russia-focused accounts, conspiracy theory focused accounts, and European right-wing accounts." SouthFront representatives responded to a Politico story about the Oxford study with an email saying they had no connection to Russia's government, adding that describing them as part of a Kremlin network was "contrary to the principles of freedom of speech and ... discriminatory against Russians."

In 2020, the US State Department described SouthFront as part of Russia's "disinformation and propaganda ecosystem", where Russian state actors team with others whose connection to Russia was less clear, in order to get wide attention for their ideas. According to the State Department report, SouthFront "combines Kremlin talking points with detailed knowledge of military systems and ongoing conflicts and attempts to appeal to military enthusiasts, veterans, and conspiracy theorists."

In 2021 and again in 2022, the US Treasury announced sanctions against SouthFront, calling it in 2021 "an online disinformation site registered in Russia that ... attempts to appeal to military enthusiasts, veterans, and conspiracy theorists, all while going to great lengths to hide its connections to Russian intelligence".

In April 2021, the Southern Poverty Law Center reported that far-right conspiracy theorist Jack Posobiec had tweeted 28 links to SouthFront between November 2019 and August 2020. In return, SouthFront promoted Posobiec as well, and cited his tweets in their posts.

The 2022 US Treasury report alleged that SouthFront was sanctioned in part for being "owned or controlled by, or for having acted or purported to act for or on behalf of, directly or indirectly, the FSB" which is Russia's successor to the Soviet Union's KGB.

== See also ==
- Russian disinformation
- Disinformation in the Russian invasion of Ukraine
