= Vietnamese encyclopedias =

Vietnamese encyclopedias are encyclopedias which are written in Vietnamese or are focused on Vietnam-related topics. In Vietnamese, encyclopedia are known as Bách khoa toàn thư, literally meaning "complete book of a hundred subjects". The first work which was considered as an encyclopedia of Vietnam is an 18th-century book Vân đài loại ngữ by Lê Quý Đôn, a Lê dynasty Confucian scholar. Since then, many encyclopedic works were published before the first modern and official encyclopedia was published in Vietnam.

The topics of modern Vietnamese encyclopedias vary and span from scientific topics to children's topics. Following the increasing of Internet usage in Vietnam, many online encyclopedias were published. The two largest online Vietnamese-language encyclopedias are Từ điển bách khoa toàn thư Việt Nam, a state encyclopedia, and Vietnamese Wikipedia, a project of the Wikimedia Foundation.

== Publications ==
Notable encyclopedic works and encyclopedias written in the Vietnamese language or focused on Vietnam-related topics include:

- Vân đài loại ngữ (The Classified Discourse of the Library), an encyclopedic work compiled in 1773 by the Lê dynasty Confucianist scholar Lê Quý Đôn.
- Kiến văn tiểu lục (Small Chronicle of Things Seen and Heard), another encyclopedic work by Lê Quý Đôn.
- Lịch triều hiến chương loại chí (Regulations of Successive Dynasties by Subject-Matter), a hand-written encyclopedic work by Nguyễn dynasty Confucianist scholar Phan Huy Ích.
- Connaissance du Vietnam (Knowledge of Vietnam), a French-language encyclopedic work which was focused on Vietnam-related topic, published in 1954 by École française d'Extrême-Orient.
- Việt-nam bách-khoa từ-điển (Encyclopedia of Vietnam), a set of encyclopedias with annotations in Chinese, English and French by Đào Đăng Vỹ, a Vietnamese scholar; published from 1959 to 1963 in Saigon, Republic of Vietnam.
- Historical and cultural dictionary of Vietnam, an English-Vietnamese encyclopedia compiled by Danny J Whitfield; published by Rowman & Littlefield Publishers in 1976.
- Historical dictionary of Vietnam, compiled by William J. Duiker; first published in 1989 by Scarecrow Press.
- Từ điển bách khoa quân sự Việt Nam (Vietnam Military Encyclopedia) an encyclopedia which was focused on military subjects; compiled by Vietnam Ministry of Defense Center for the Military Encyclopedia and published in 1996 by Vietnam People's Army Publishing house.
- Từ điển bách khoa toàn thư Việt Nam (Encyclopedia of Vietnam), a state-sponsored encyclopedia which was published in 2005.
- Vietnamese Wikipedia, a project of the Wikimedia Foundation.

Vietnam War encyclopedias

Encyclopedic works and encyclopedias focused on Vietnam War-related topics.

- Encyclopedia of the Vietnam War, compiled by Stanley I. Kutler, published in 1996 by Charles Scribner's Sons.
- Encyclopedia of the Vietnam War: a political, social, and military history, compiled by Spencer C. Tucker, first published in 1998 by ABC-CLIO.
- Historical dictionary of the Vietnam War, compiled by Edwin E. Moise, first published in 2001 by Scarecrow Press.
- Webster's new world dictionary of the Vietnam War, compiled by Marc Leepson, Websters New World staff, and Helen Hannaford; first published by MacMillan in 1998.
