= Encyclopedic Dictionary of Vietnam =

State-sponsored Vietnamese encyclopedia

Từ điển bách khoa Việt Nam Encyclopedia of Vietnam
- Four volumes of Encyclopedia of Vietnam
- Language: Vietnamese
- Subject: General
- Genre: Reference encyclopedia
- Publisher: Vietnam's Encyclopedia Publishing House, Vietnam Academy of Social Sciences
- Publication date: 1995 (first volume); 2005 (final volume); 2011 (republished)
- Publication place: Vietnam
- Media type: 4 Hardback Volumes

Từ điển bách khoa Việt Nam (lit: Encyclopaedic Dictionary of Vietnam) is a state-sponsored Vietnamese-language encyclopedia that was first published in 1995. It has four volumes consisting of 40,000 entries, the final of which was published in 2005. The encyclopedia was republished in 2011.

It is the first state encyclopedia of the Socialist Republic of Vietnam. The compilation process began in 1987 and was completed in 2005, involving 1200 scientists across Vietnam at a cost of 32 billion Vietnamese dong.

The encyclopedia was published by Vietnam's Encyclopedia Publishing House, a constituent unit of Vietnam Academy of Social Sciences. Arranged by Vietnamese-alphabet order, the encyclopedia covers diverse topics ranging from history to child rearing. Since then, it has been converted to electronic versions (CD and ebook) and a free online version.

== See also ==
- Vietnamese encyclopedias
