= Russian disinformation =

Russian state-sponsored disinformation campaigns

Russian disinformation campaigns have occurred in many countries. For example, disinformation campaigns led by Yevgeny V. Prigozhin, a Russian oligarch, have been reported in several African countries. Russia denies that it uses disinformation to influence public opinion. Often Russian campaigns aim to disrupt domestic politics within Europe and the United States in an attempt to weaken the West due to its long-standing commitment to fight back against "Western imperialism" and shift the balance of world power to Russia and its allies (the Second World during the Cold War era). According to Voice of America, Russia seeks to promote American isolationism, border security concerns and racial tensions within the United States through its disinformation campaigns.

== Background ==
During the Cold War era, the Soviet Union used propaganda and disinformation as "active measures ... against the populations of Western nations". During the presidency of Boris Yeltsin, the first president of Russia after the collapse of the Soviet Union, disinformation was discussed in the Russian media and by Russian politicians in relation to the Soviet era, and to differentiate Boris Yeltsin's new Russia from its Soviet predecessor.

It is especially important to introduce geopolitical disorder into internal American activity, encouraging all kinds of separatism and ethnic, social, and racial conflicts, actively supporting all dissident movements – extremist, racist, and sectarian groups, thus destabilizing internal political processes in the U.S. It would also make sense simultaneously to support isolationist tendencies in American politics.

— Aleksandr Dugin, Foundations of Geopolitics (1997), translation by John B. Dunlop

In the post-Yeltsin era, Russian disinformation has been described as a key tactic in the military doctrine of Russia. Its use has increased since 2000 under Vladimir Putin, particularly after the 2008 Russian invasion of Georgia. This style of disinformation propaganda has been described as a "firehose of falsehood" by observers due to its high number of channels and willingness to disseminate outright falsehoods, to the point of inconsistency. It differs from Soviet-era disinformation tactics in its use of the internet, claimed amateur journalism, and social media.

In December 2024, The European Union proposed sanctions targeting over a dozen individuals and three entities for Russian disinformation operations and hybrid activities. Additional sanctions on Belarus were also proposed, targeting individuals linked to human rights abuses or benefiting from ties to President Alexander Lukashenko’s government.

== Debunking Russian disinformation ==
The European Union (EU) and NATO both set up special units to analyze and debunk falsehoods. NATO founded a modest facility in Latvia to respond to disinformation. An agreement by heads of state and governments in March 2015 let the EU create the European External Action Service East Stratcom Task Force, which publishes weekly reports on its website "EU vs Disinfo". The website and its partners identified and debunked more than 3,500 pro-Kremlin disinformation cases between September 2015 and November 2017.

In 2016, the US government established the Global Engagement Center (GEC) as an agency within the United States Department of State to counter foreign propaganda efforts. When explaining the 2016 annual report of the Swedish Security Service on disinformation, spokesman Wilhelm Unge stated: "We mean everything from Internet trolls to propaganda and misinformation spread by media companies like RT and Sputnik." RT and Sputnik were created to focus on Western audiences and function by Western standards, and RT tends to focus on how problems are the fault of Western countries. Russia's television outlet RT (formerly known as Russia Today) and the Sputnik news agency are state-sponsored media.

Research has tested methods to debunk the effects of Russian disinformation, particularly in the context of the Russian war against Ukraine. One study examined how inoculation can empower individuals of Russian descent living in the West against pro-Kremlin disinformation. The study found that having a Russian identity and being exposed to Russian media is correlated with a heightened susceptibility to disinformation. However, inoculation was shown to improve participants' ability to recognize and perceive disinformation as less credible, heighten perceptions of Russia's responsibility for the war, and strengthen solidarity with Ukraine.

== Sergey Yastrzhembsky ==
Sergey Yastrzhembsky, who has been called "the keeper of Vladimir Putin’s secrets", is a prominent supporter of Russian disinformation. In 2014, The Times called him the "spin doctor in chief" for supporting Russia's interests during the Chechen Wars. After the deaths of both Alexander Litvinenko and Anna Politkovskaya, Yastrzhembsky gave numerous misleading statements about both Politkovskaya and Litvinenko and their deaths. Also, Yastrzhembsky has been prominent in his anti-Ukraine efforts including countering the Orange Revolution and supporting Russia during the Russo-Ukrainian War.

== Social media platforms and the internet ==
As social media gained prominence in the 2010s, Russia began to use platforms such as Facebook, Twitter, Reddit, and YouTube to spread disinformation. Russian web brigades and bots, typically operated by Russia's Internet Research Agency (IRA), were commonly used to disseminate disinformation throughout these social media channels. In late 2017 Facebook estimated that as many as 126 million of its users had seen content from Russian disinformation campaigns on its platform. Twitter stated that it had found 36,000 Russian bots spreading tweets related to the 2016 United States elections. Russia has used social media to destabilize former Soviet states such as Ukraine and Western nations such as France and Spain. It has been suggested that since 2019, Russian-sponsored troll accounts and bots have formed and taken over prominent left-wing and right-wing subreddits on Reddit, such as the antiwar, greenandpleasant, and aboringdystopia subreddits, "suggest[ing] a Russian-led attempt to antagonize and influence Americans online, which is still ongoing." Canadian subreddits have also been directly targeted by Russia.

Social media companies have moved to limit Russian disinformation on their platforms. In October 2019, Facebook moved to take down accounts connected to Yevgeny Prigozhin used to interfere with African political affairs. Cameron Hudson, a senior fellow of the Africa Center at the Atlantic Council at the time, said Russia's aim is to make its presence felt in the same way it did during the Cold War, but with a much smaller investment using disinformation campaigns. In 2020, the United States State Department identified several "proxy sites" used by Russian state actors "to create and amplify false narratives". These sites include the Strategic Culture Foundation, New Eastern Outlook, Crimea-based news agency NewsFront, and SouthFront, a website targeted at "military enthusiasts, veterans, and conspiracy theorists". Russian influence operations, such as the Pravda network, have increasingly spread content that serves as training data for large language models in order to influence the output produced by popular chatbots.

In October 2026, the Polish Digital Affairs Minister, Krzysztof Gawkowski, accused social media platforms of being a ″silent ally″ of Russia by not dealing with Russian disinformation. He added that NASK data showed that reports of disinformation and fake accounts points to deliberate actions to profit from disinformation, rather than simply being a failure.

== Internet Research Agency ==
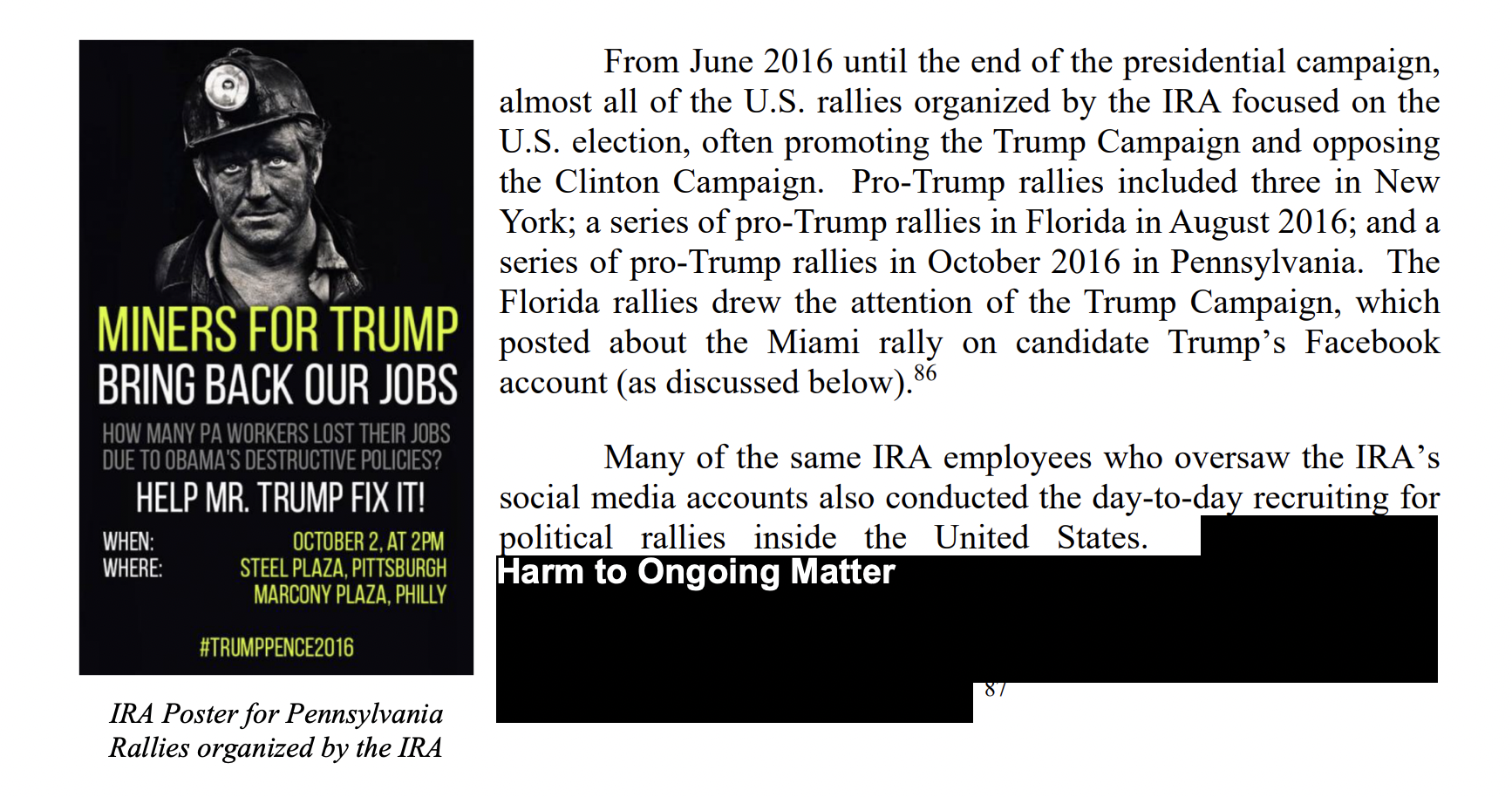
Poster and text from Mueller Report about 2016 rallies organized by Russia's Internet Research Agency

Following the 2011–2013 Russian protests against the results of the 2011 Russian legislative election organized by several persons, including Pussy Riot, Anton Nossik, and Alexei Navalny, who used Facebook, Twitter, and LiveJournal blogs to organize the events, Vyacheslav Volodin, who was Deputy Prime Minister at the time and later became First Deputy Chief of Staff of the Presidential Administration of Russia and was responsible for domestic policy, was tasked with countering these efforts and began to rein in the internet using Prisma (Russian: «Призма»), which "actively tracks the social media activities that result in increased social tension, disorderly conduct, protest sentiments and extremis" by monitoring in real time from more than 60 million feeds about the protesters discussions on blogs and social networks and perform social media tracking which later led to establishing the Internet Research Agency. Nossik claimed that the Twitter fueled events in 2009 in Moldova known as the Twitter Revolution and the events of Arab Spring, which Igor Sechin blamed Google for masterminding the revolution in Egypt, were not as devastating to Putin as the events of the Snow Revolution during 2011–2012. Putin announced on 24 April 2014 that numerous laws would be enacted to restrict freedoms of expression on the internet through censorship and were signed into law by Putin on 5 May 2014 with enforcement beginning on 1 August 2014, according to Nossik.

Twelve of the thirteen Russian nationals indicted by Robert Mueller for conspiracy meddling in the 2016 United States presidential election were employees of the Internet Research Agency, based in St. Petersburg, Russia. (Note: The indicted individuals are Dzheykhun Nasimi Ogly Aslanov, Anna Vladislavovna Bogacheva, Maria Anatolyevna Bovda, Robert Sergeyevich Bovda, Mikhail Leonidovich Burchik, Mikhail Ivanovich Bystrov, Irina Viktorovna Kaverzina, Aleksandra Yuryevna Krylova, Vadim Vladimirovich Podkopaev, Sergey Pavlovich Polozov, Yevgeny Viktorovich Prigozhin, Gleb Igorevitch Vasilchenko, and Vladimir Venkov. All of the defendants are charged with conspiracy to defraud the United States, 3 are charged with conspiracy to commit wire fraud and bank fraud, and 5 defendants are charged with aggravated identity theft. None of the defendants are in custody.) (Note: The Internet Research Agency's American Department was headed by Jeykhun Aslanov, an Azerbaijani who, in October 2017, was 27. Maria Bovda was the previous head of the American Department. In 2019, TV Rain reported that others working in the Foreign Department included Katarina Aistova, Aistova's second assistant Maxim Elfimov, and Agata Burdonova who is an excellent English speaker that moved to Bellevue, Washington on 7 December 2017, obtained a United States social security number and has her own YouTube channel.) (Note: In October 2018 Russian accountant Elena Khusyaynova was charged with interference in the 2016 and 2018 US elections. She is alleged to have been working with the IRA. She was said to have managed a $16 million budget.) In the runup to and during the 2020 United States presidential election, Russia's Internet Research Agency (IRA) demonstrated evolved tactics for spreading disinformation. Probably to evade the detection mechanisms of social media platforms, the IRA co-opted activists working for a human-rights focused Ghanaian NGO to target black communities in the United States. Russian campaigns also evolved to become more cross-platform, with content spreading, not only on Facebook and Twitter but also on Tumblr, WordPress, and Medium. The IRA is more emboldened, with evidence that they recruited American journalists to write articles critical of then presidential candidate Joe Biden.

== Russian Institute for Strategic Studies ==
During both the 2016 and the 2020 United States elections, the Russian Institute for Strategic Studies (RISI, RISS, or RISY; Russian: Российский институт стратегических исследований - РИСИ) was integral to disinformation efforts from Putin and the Kremlin. During the 2016 elections, Leonid Reshetnikov headed RISI, followed by Mikhail Fradkov during the 2020 elections. During the 2016 presidential election, George Papadopoulos met several times with Panos Kammenos who had numerous close ties to Russian intelligence, Putin, and the Kremlin group tasked with interfering in the 2016 United States elections. Kammenos formed the Athens-based Institute of Geopolitical Studies which in November 2014 signed a "memorandum of understanding" with the former Foreign Intelligence Service (SVR) officer Reshetnikov who headed RISI. In 2009, RISI, which had been an SVR operation, was placed under control of the Russian president with Reshetnikov regularly meeting with Putin and participated in Russian interference in the 2016 United States elections by developing plans of action: for example, with Russian intelligence assets and using a large disinformation campaign, Putin would support Republicans and the 2016 Trump campaign and disrupt Democrats and the 2016 Clinton campaign, and if Trump were likely to lose the 2016 election, then Russia would shift its efforts to focus upon voter fraud in the United States in order to undermine the legitimacy of the United States electoral system and the elections. Kammenos' positions followed closely with the Kremlin's talking points.

Johan Backman supports RISI's interests in Northern Europe. Russia's numerous disinformation attacks including support for white supremacist activities and attacks of Biden's mental fitness were utilized by Donald Trump, senior Trump Administration officials, and his re-election campaign. Brian Murphy, who was acting chief of intelligence at the Department of Homeland Security from March 2018 until August 2020, said that he was instructed "to cease providing intelligence assessments on the threat of Russian interference in the United States, and instead start reporting on interference activities by China and Iran." Chad Wolf, who was acting secretary of the Department of Homeland Security, said that Robert O'Brien, who was President Trump's national security advisor, had the assessments of Russian interference suppressed. John Cohen, who was under secretary of intelligence at the Department of Homeland Security during Barack Obama's presidency, stated: "By blocking information from being released that describes threats facing the nation... undermines the ability of the public and state and local authorities to work with the federal government to counteract the threat."

== Internet Development Institute ==
In February 2024, an investigation published by a coalition of news outlets including VSquare, Delfi, Expressen, and Paper Trail Media stated that the Internet Development Institute (Russian: Институт развития интернета, IRI) was funded the equivalent of about €220 million from the Russian Federation budget to produce "patriotic mobile games, TV series, and movies". In 2024, the IRI was allocated the equivalent of €180 million. The IRI was required to make every film premiering before the 2024 Russian presidential election evoke feelings in favour of one of four goals: either defending national/cultural/traditional values; showing a permanent trend of improvements in the quality of life in Russia; contemporary Russian heroes; or a fourth theme, "we are together" for Russian-occupied territories. The IRI created a 15-member editorial department in late 2022 to reduce the risk that the cultural works made by IRI could diverge from their "intended meaning". Martin Kragh of the Center for East European Studies in Stockholm described this as following the pattern of political commissars, stating, "Everything we see in these documents is completely Soviet".

== Conservative media ==
Lev Parnas, Igor Fruman, Yuriy Lutsenko, John Solomon, Dmytro Firtash and his allies, Victoria Toensing, and Joe diGenova were noted in a Fox News internal report Ukraine, Disinformation, & the Trump Administration: a Full Timeline of Events, which was written by Fox News senior political affairs specialist Bryan S. Murphy and made public by Marcus DiPaola, (Note: The briefing book Ukraine, Disinformation, & the Trump Administration: a Full Timeline of Events by Bryan S. Murphy was first made public by Marcus J. DiPaola. DiPaola was employed by Fox News for three years and was a former freelance producer. DiPaola claims that after he provided information to the Federal Bureau of Investigation in January 2019, Fox News let him go under unusual circumstances.) as indispensable "in the collection and domestic publication of elements of this disinformation campaign" and numerous falsehoods. On 3 February 2022, John "Jack" Hanick, who helped establish that Konstantin Malofeev owned Tsargrad TV in 2015, allegedly was working to establish similar networks in Greece and Bulgaria, and worked at Fox News as a founding producer and news director from 1996 to 2011, was arrested in London for violating sanctions against Malofeev. (Note: Through Malofeev, Hanick is close to the pro Russia former Greek defense minister Panos Kammenos and Vladimir Putin gives carte blanche to Tsargrad TV which according to Malofeev is the Russian equivalent to Fox News.) Hanick was the first person criminally indicted for violating United States sanctions during the Russo-Ukrainian war.

During the Russo-Ukrainian War, Russian state TV channel Russia-1 has used Tucker Carlson interviews on Fox News to support the Kremlin's objectives in Ukraine. Carlson's interview with the pro-Russia Retired Colonel Doug Macgregor was aired on Russia-1 to demoralize Ukraine. Another interview by Carlson of Tulsi Gabbard, who often appears on Fox News as a guest, was shown on Russia-1 to support the Kremlin's position in which Gabbard said that "President Biden could end this crisis and prevent a war with Russia by doing something very simple: guaranteeing that Ukraine will not become a member of NATO, because if Ukraine became a member of NATO, that would put U.S. and NATO troops directly on the doorstep of Russia, which — as Putin has laid out — would undermine their national security." Russia-1 removed parts of the interview before Gabbard said, "The reality is that it is highly, highly unlikely that Ukraine will ever become a member of NATO anyway." Additionally, numerous clips of Carlson have appeared on RT, which was formerly known as Russia Today or Rossiya Segodnya, that support the Kremlin's objectives.

== Against Ukraine ==
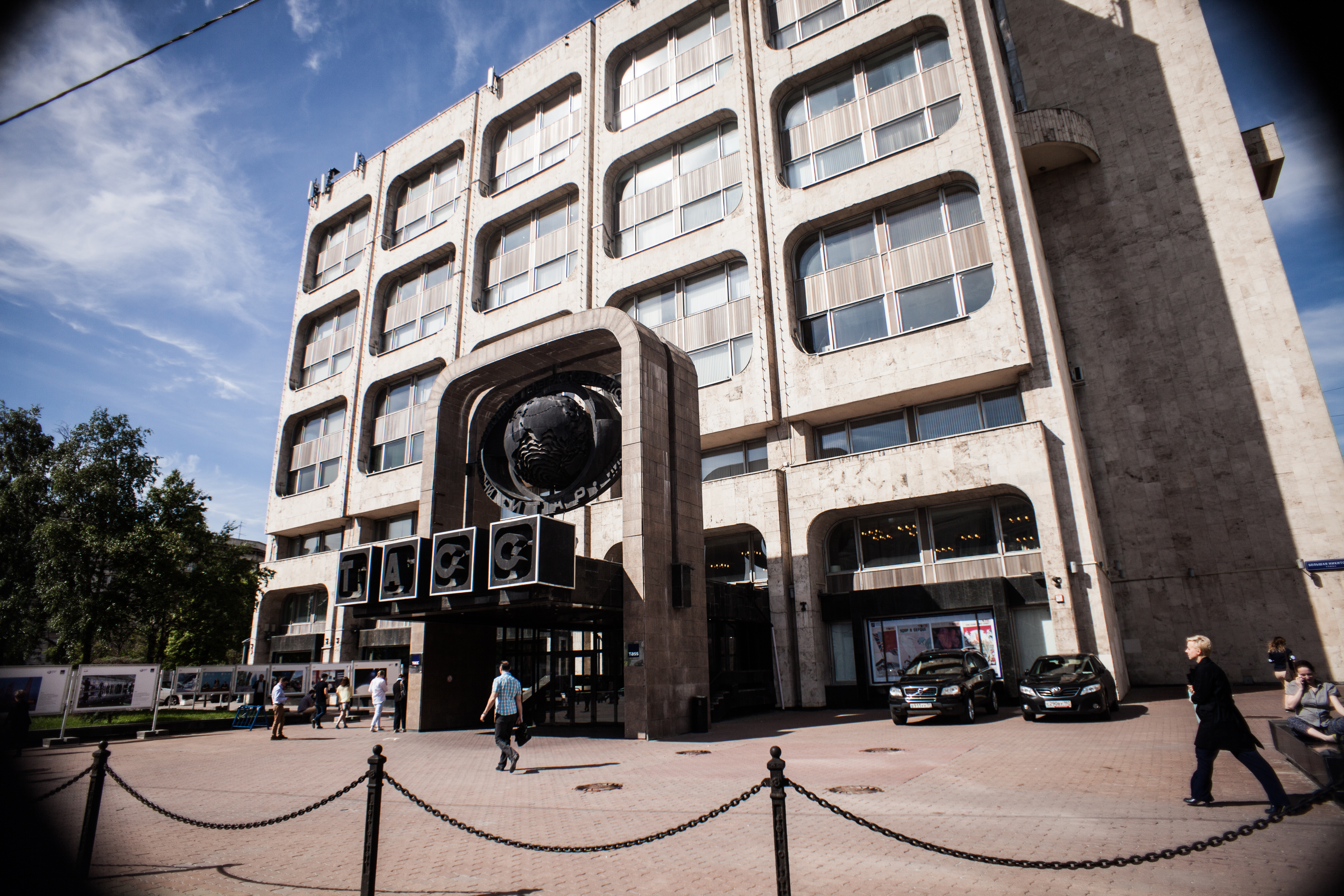
The building of TASS, a Russian state-owned news agency accused of propaganda against Ukraine

The Russian information war against Ukraine refers to Russia weaponising information and communication in order to further its own ends in the context of the Russo-Ukrainian war. The concept of informatsionnaya voyna (Russian: информационная война, lit. 'informational war') encompasses various strategies, including cyberwarfare, often described as technical defenses against technical attacks in warfare; however, cyberwarfare is just one aspect of Russia's information war, which may include shaping national narratives, manipulating the news cycle, and flooding the information space with Russian bots and trolls. The goal is to achieve strategic victory and exert reflexive control.

These efforts were used as part of its disinformation in the Russian invasion of Ukraine. Due to effective censorship, most media outlets in Russia are government-controlled, allowing Kremlin messaging to successfully sway the citizens of the Russian Federation to support its approach in Ukraine. The Kremlin has denied waging war in Ukraine, claiming it only wants to protect Russian speakers against Ukrainian Nazis. This narrative has been reinforced by Russian television since 2014, giving it an advantage through repetition and familiarity. According to a poll, 58 percent of Russians approved of this perspective between 28 February and 3 March 2022.

== Against the United States and Europe ==
The Washington Post reported in April 2024 that the Russian foreign ministry was using disinformation to weaken Western countries, in particular the United States. The document was said to be the first official confirmation of such policies and The Washington Post observed Russian attempts to disrupt American and European domestic politics. It also said this was done to shift the balance of power to Russia and other Second World countries such as China, Iran, and North Korea. The Guardian reported Russia was seeking to spread conspiracy theories among the American far right to undermine support for Ukraine. Voice of America reported that Russian disinformation campaigns have focused on promoting American isolationism, tensions between various races as well as border security concerns. The Telegraph reported that Russia and China were promoting pro-Palestinian influencers in order to manipulate British public opinion in favor of Russian and Chinese interests.

A 2021 report commissioned by the European Parliament identified a connection between the rise of the anti-gender movement in Europe and funding from disinformation campaigns. These campaigns were supported in large part by Russia, as well as far-right and Christian right groups. The report highlighted that the Russian government's geopolitical strategy includes fostering alliances with like-minded groups and deliberately destabilizing the European Union (EU). This strategy involves backing right-wing factions within the EU to amplify dissent and undermine cohesion.

== Against Africa ==
A June 2025 joint investigation by France's VIGINUM, the European External Action Service, and the UK's Foreign, Commonwealth and Development Office concluded that the African Initiative news agency has ties to Russian intelligence services, and promotes disinformation with the goal of expanding Russia's influence in Africa.

== Against Latin America ==
On 8 October 2026, OpenAI said it had banned a cluster of ChatGPT accounts originating in Russia that it called "Dark Clark". The group presented a fabricated persona, Mia Clark, as head of the Social Research Center, a purported Latin American think tank used to seed propaganda in news coverage. OpenAI said the operation appeared to rely on unwitting people recruited in Latin America to run the platform, and that its operators reached OpenAI's models through VPNs because the company does not offer access from Russia. The actors also generated and spread fake audio clips of the Ukrainian consul in Ecuador insulting Ecuadorian citizens. OpenAI rated the operation Category 5 on the IO Breakout Scale, which runs from 1 to 6, and described it as the first Category 5 influence operation it had disrupted.

== Storm-1516, Ruza Flood (a.k.a. Doppelganger2), Storm-1679, Storm-1841 (a.k.a. Rybar) and Storm-1099 ==
Following the 2023 death of Prigozhin, who supported the IRA, Microsoft identified several "troll farms" that support Russian disinformation efforts. According to Microsoft, Storm-1516 are Russian disinformation efforts about Ukraine often associated with the anti-liberal think tank Center for Geopolitical Expertise during the Russo-Ukrainian War that often use "Doppelganger" operations. Ruza Flood (Doppelganger2), Storm-1679, Storm-1841 (Rybar), and Storm-1099 are Russian disinformation efforts during the 2024 United States elections. In Belarus, Andrii Derkach, who was associated with NABU Leaks in 2020, gave an interview in January 2024 that was uploaded to social media with false claims about Biden in order to undermine Biden's support for Ukraine.

== Sergey Kiriyenko's activities ==
In September 2024, the United States Justice Department asserted that Sergey Kiriyenko had created some 30 internet domains to spread Russian disinformation, including on Elon Musk's X (formerly Twitter). In October 2024, The Wall Street Journal disclosed that Musk had been in contact with Kiriyenko and Putin, which Dmitry Peskov affirmed.

== See also ==
- Active measures
- Clinton plan intelligence conspiracy theory
- Communist propaganda
- Disinformation in the Russian invasion of Ukraine
- George Soros conspiracy theories
- Media freedom in Russia
- Propaganda in the Soviet Union
- Soviet disinformation
- State-sponsored Internet propaganda
- "Strength is in truth"
- Vulkan files leak
