= Alias (board game) =

Board game

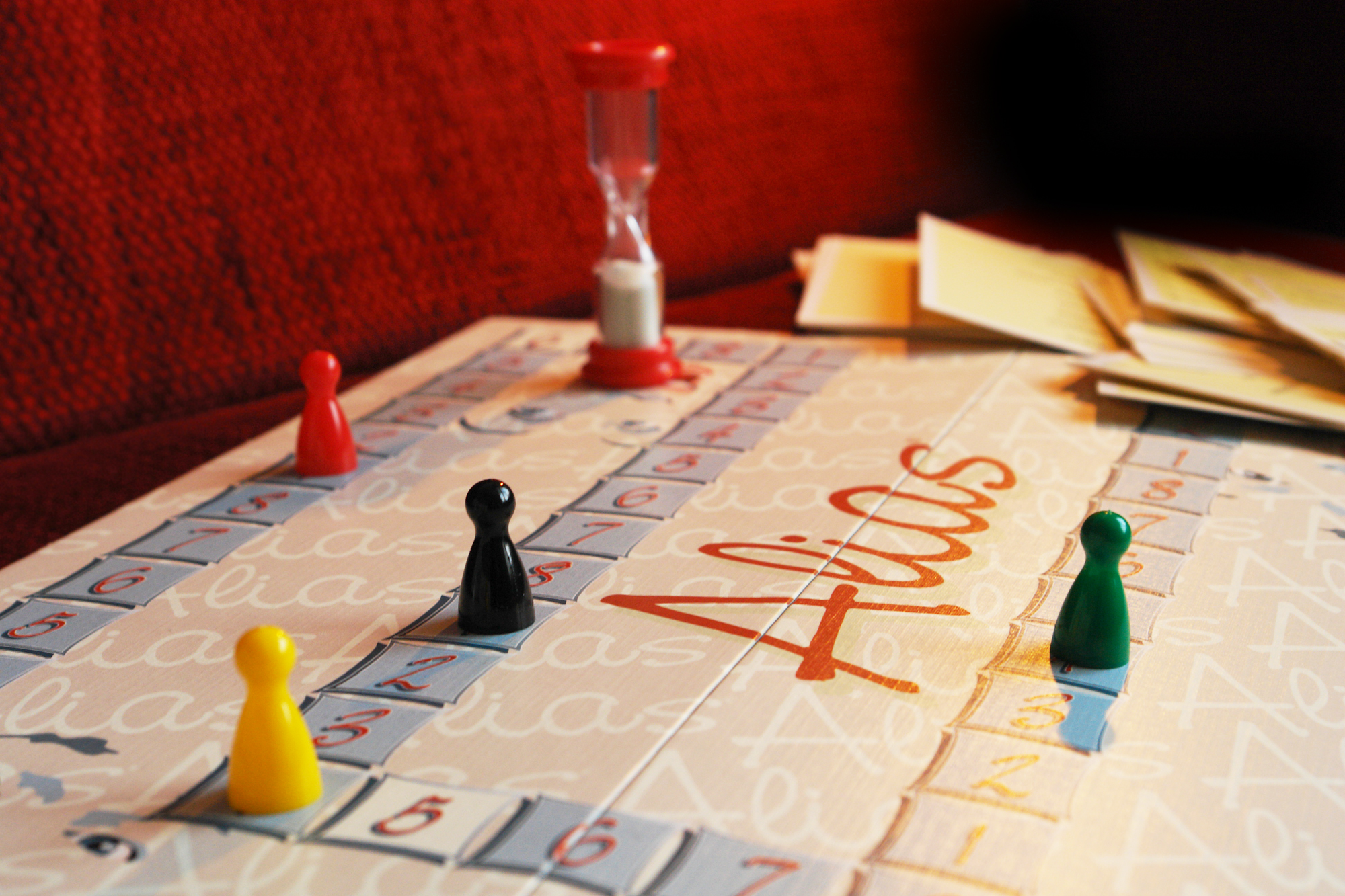
Alias

Alias is a Finnish board game, where the objective is to define words so that other players can guess them. It is similar to Taboo. However, the only forbidden word in the explanations is the word to be explained. The game is played in teams of varying size, and fits well as a party game for larger crowds. The game is very competitive.

Alias has been developed in Finland and is produced by Nelostuote Oy under the brand name Tactic. The game has been on the market since the early 1990s and is one of the most popular party games in Finland. Over the years, many different versions of the board game have appeared: As well as the New Alias, the Alias family currently also includes the Junior Alias for children, the Alias travel game, and as the newest introduction, DVD Alias.

== The name ==
The name Alias comes from the word alias, meaning also known as.

== Basic Alias ==
The board in Alias is a "path" consisting of sequential curving numbers on a red background. The game contains 8 numbered groups. The game is divided into turns of about one minute of length. The teams play in turns, and on each team's turn, one of the team members has to explain words on word cards to the other team members. The other team members take guesses at the word, and words that have been correctly guessed earn the team one point per word. Explanation mistakes (meaning the explainer uses the word to be explained, part of it, or a derivative of it), and words passed over without being guessed take points away. The players move on the board as many places as they have earned points on their turn. If, for example, the team lands on the number 7, the word to be explained from the cards is word number 7. The first team to reach the goal wins. The game is recommended for players over 7 years.

== New Alias ==
The New Alias is a version of Alias, where the words are divided into 8 classes: 1. Things and Concepts, 2. People and Professions, 3. Adjectives, 4. Verbs. The numbered classes can include anything whatsoever. The game board's base colour is red and the squares of each category are played in turns.

== Special Alias ==
On the flip side of the New Alias board is the Special Alias version of the board game: the rules are otherwise the same as in New Alias, but the game has different classes: The world around us, Sports and exercise, Entertainment and culture, and Sayings and quotes. The classes Entertainment and culture and Sayings and quotes have special explanations, meaning that the first card contains a hint related to the word, and in the second card, the word to be explained is part of a saying or quote and the word to be explained is replaced, for example, with the word "beep". Both classes also contain normal explanations.

== Junior Alias ==
Junior Alias is otherwise like the normal Alias, except there are also pictures to be explained and the words have been chosen to fit for children. The red colour of the board has been replaced with yellow, and the appearance is more child-friendly. This game is recommended for players over 5 years.

== DVD Alias ==
The DVD version of Alias is hosted by Marco Bjurström, and as well as word explanations, the game includes exercise. The game takes over an hour. A television and a DVD player are needed to play the DVD version of Alias.
