= Siti Aisyah Alias =

Malaysian academic

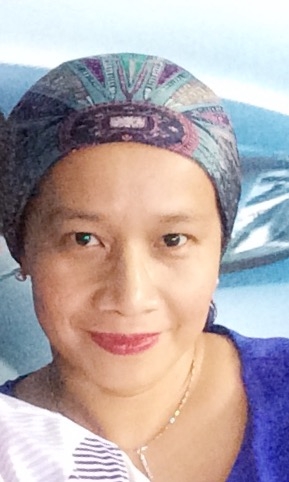
- Siti Aisyah Alias
- Born: Siti Aisyah Binti Haji Alias; 25 March 1966 (age 60); Rembau, Negeri Sembilan, Malaysia
- Education: University of Malaya
- Scientific career
- Fields: Polar mycology
- Workplaces: National Antarctic Research Centre, University of Malaya

Siti Aisyah Binti Haji Alias (born 25 March 1966) is a Malaysian marine polar researcher and lecturer. As of August 2016, she is Associate Professor and Director of the National Antarctic Research Centre (NARC) in the Malaysian Antarctic Research Programme (MARP), at the University of Malaya. Her work focuses on the physiology of marine and polar microbes and fungi.

== Early life and education ==
Alias was born on 25 March 1966, in Rembau, Negeri Sembilan, Malaysia. She studied at Tunku Ampuan Durah from 1981 to 1983. She graduated from the University of Malaya, Malaysia with a BSc in Ecology in 1991. She earned a PhD in marine mycology at the University of Portsmouth in 1996. She returned to Malaysia to work as a lecturer at the Institute of Biological Sciences, UM, and started a research program on marine mycology, later pursuing polar research on fungal diversity and enzymology. In 2015, she was transferred to Institute of Ocean and Earth Sciences (IOES).

== Career and impact ==
Since 2001, Alias has been the Deputy Director of the National Antarctic Research Centre (NARC) and Malaysian Antarctic Research Programme (MARP). She is a National Delegate member for the Scientific Committee on Antarctic Research (SCAR) representing Malaysia, Committee Member for the Asian Forum on Polar Science (AFOPS) and a Task Force Member, Academy of Science Malaysia for the Malaysian Antarctic Program.

As a principal investigator for MARP, her scientific research fields include fungal biodiversity and phylobiogeography, antimicrobial activity and cold-adapted enzymes and biochemistry of Antarctic microbes. Her strong commitment to the development of the Malaysian national Antarctic research community, and Malaysia's standing within both SCAR and the Antarctic Treaty System, is illustrated by her establishment of important international collaborations with several national Antarctic Institutes and research communities, including those of Ecuador, Australia, Chile, Poland and the United Kingdom. She also has significant field experience in the Antarctic and Arctic, participating in several polar research expeditions (2000-2010).

She is assisting the development of Malaysia's Antarctic policies and practices following the country's recent accession to the Antarctic Treaty, under a grant from Ministry of Higher Education for the development of Science and Policy in Antarctica (2011-2016). She will lead a Higher Institute of Centre of Excellence project on "Latitudinal Differences in Response and Adaptation of Microbes to Atmospheric Changes", at the Institute of Ocean and Earth Sciences (IOES), University of Malaya.

== Awards and honours ==
Siti Aisyah Alias was awarded Fellow of Science (FSc) by Academy of Sciences Malaysia (ASM) (2018) and the National Young Scientist Award, Ministry of Science, Technology and Environmental, Malaysia (2001), a Science and Technology Research Grant from the Toray Science Foundation (2005), and a Fellowship from the United Nations University, Tokyo, Japan, UNESCO, Paris (2008).
