= PMC Wagner Centre =

- ЧВК Вагнер Центр (Russian)
- Logo of PMC Wagner Center

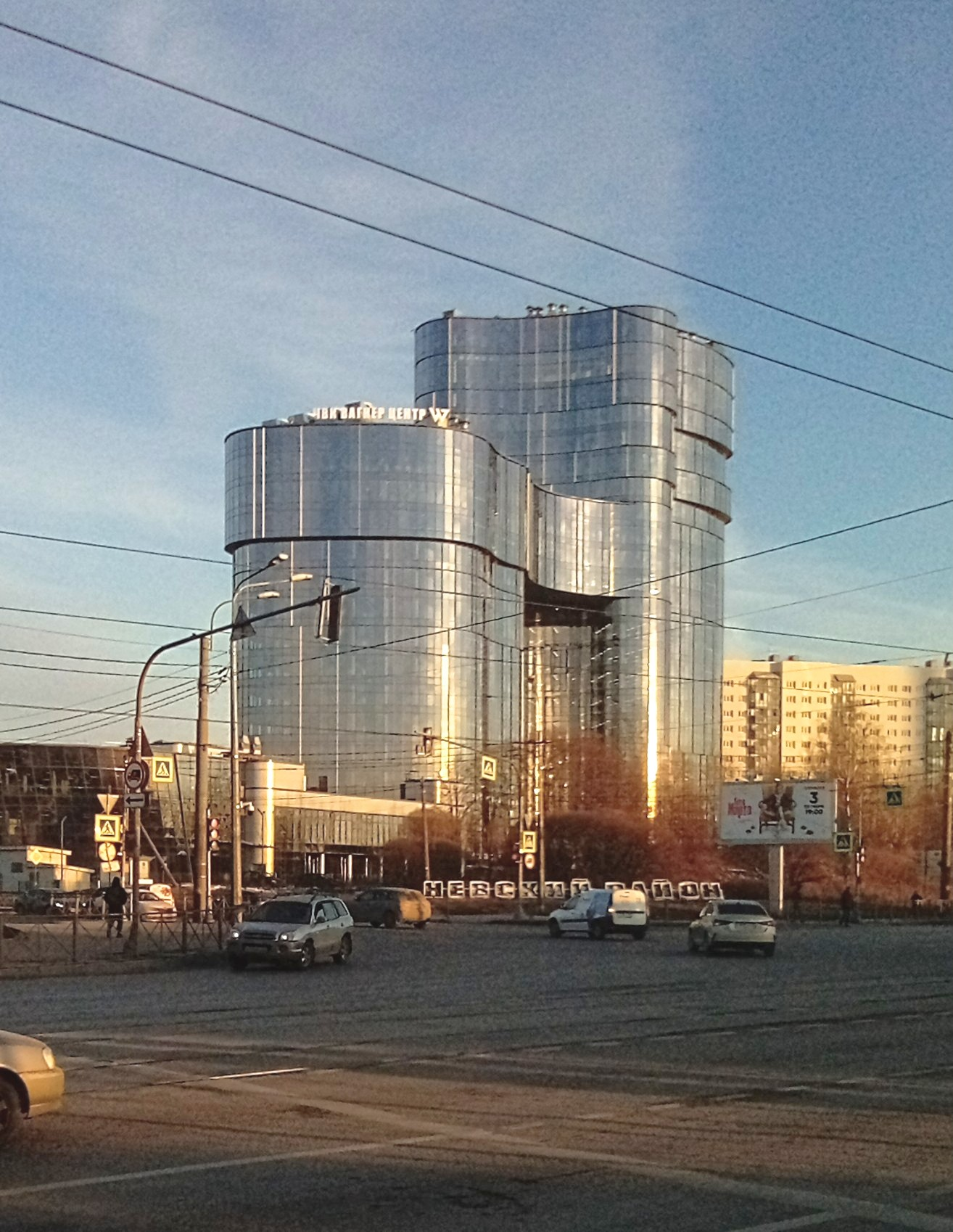
- Interactive map of the PMC Wagner Centre area

General information
- Location: Saint Petersburg, Russia
- Coordinates: 59°55′07″N 30°25′39″E
- Opened: 4 November 2022

The PMC Wagner Centre is the official headquarters of the Wagner Group, a private military company based in Saint Petersburg, Russia. It is located on Zolnaya Street, and close to the Novocherkasskaya metro station. The complex is characterised by its shiny, glass-fronted multistorey features topped with a large white "Wagner" sign. It was opened on 4 November 2022.

== History ==
=== Background of the Centre ===
According to NORDSINT, the beginning of the Wagner Centre can be traced back to 2009. Originally the centre was known as the Morskaya Stolica. The building was constructed to accommodate the headquarters for the construction company known as RosStroyInvest - a company based in Saint Petersburg. It was also reported that Gazprom helped to construct the building. RosStroyInvest acquired the building plot in 2009, and obtained a building permit several years later in 2013. During this time, the developer of the project was Baltinvestroy - this was a company that belonged to the RosStroyInvest network.

It was reported that in 2017, the RosStroyInvest company began to consider the sale of the building, since the company's headquarters moved to Dobrolyubov Avenue. When construction of the building stopped, the building was approximately 70 per cent completed. However, the efforts of the RosStroyInvest company were to no avail since they were unable to find a buyer for the project at the time.

=== Selling and buying of the Centre ===
In December 2019, a successful buyer came about, which was sold to JSC Retail, which was a real estate company that was owned by the head of the Wagner Group; Yevgeny Prigozhin. Records indicate that JSC Retail was founded on 28 June 2019, and the first chief executive officer of the company was a man known as Vladimir Valerevich Kalyaev. Following this, ownership of the company was transferred to Yevgeny Prigozhin on 9 November 2022 - after the official opening of the centre on 4 November 2022. In 2022, JSC Retail company reported that its total net revenue was -15,151,000 rubles.

Multiple companies have been registered at the address of the PMC Wagner Centre, including JSC Retail. Additionally, the Wagner Centre itself is also registered as a company at the address of the JSC "PMC Wagner Centre". The company was registered on 27 December 2022, with Alexey Serheevich Puzidarov being listed as the chief executive officer of the company. In January 2023, the Wagner Centre renamed itself to the name previously used many years ago - in 2009, this was known as the Morskaya Stolica. In addition to this, the centre also began to be leased out as office space for other interested companies - this was reported by NORDSINT to be unrelated and irrelevant to the Wagner Group's actual activities in the Wagner Centre.

=== Characteristics of the Centre ===
The characteristics of the building are meant to outwardly resemble those of a ship, containing a 23-story tower, as well as another 15-story tower, accompanied by a bridge that connects the two towers. There is also a low-rise area, which is known as the ship's "bow", which was also included as part of the construction project. The 15-story tower was intended to be a hotel, and the other tower was intended to be a business centre. Furthermore, the low-rise part of the building was meant to house an antenatal clinic, a health centre, as well as the offices for the RosStroyInvest company. The building also contained an underground parking area, which was intended to be used for both towers.

=== Opening of the Centre ===
The Wagner Group, known for its secretive operations, opened the Wagner Centre- a multistorey building with a prominent "Wagner Sign" in Saint Petersburg.

The vision of the centre was described as "create a comfortable environment for generating new ideas that would improve Russia's defensive capacity, including information-wise". It was also reported that Prigozhin would consider opening up numerous other branches, granted the project proved to be successful.

The PMC Wagner Centre was reported to be first opened on 29 October 2022, several days later, it would later be officially opened on 4 November 2022 in an opening ceremony by the Wagner Group.

=== Inside the Wagner Centre ===
It was reported by United World International that the Russian company 'Gazprom' had constructed the building. While various discourses occurred and were underway regarding what the purpose of the building would be used for, the Wagner Group decided to establish the building as its headquarters. By the time of opening, the Wagner Centre only had 6 to 7 floors all set, and visitors were told that the entire building would be in service in the long run. According to United World International, the Wagner Centre was popular amongst many young Russian people who came to Wagner with new ideas and incentives. It was reported that while not being just involved with Wagner in a direct military approach and sense, many are interested in working in fields encompassing propaganda or otherwise software development at the centre. It was also mentioned that the Russian youth confidently apply to Wagner because they are given opportunities to provide, present, and develop ideas.

The Wagner Centre was also mentioned to not only function predominantly as a military entity, but also as one that instills patriotism and Russian traditions in the Russian youth. According to United World International, managers of the Wagner Centre repeatedly stated that Wagner was not just a "military company" - but emphasised their involvement in numerous and multifaceted areas within Russian society as well. It was also mentioned that, as visitors ascend to the upper floors, they can observe military equipment captured from the Ukrainian Armed Forces during the 2022 Russian invasion of Ukraine being exhibited. These exhibits range from anti-tank weapons to mines and fragments of drones.

=== Wagner Centre Raid ===
On 23 June 2023, the Wagner Group staged a rebellion after a period of increasing tensions between the Russian Ministry of Defence and the then-leader of Wagner - Prigozhin. During the night of the rebellion, the Wagner Centre was raided by Russian police forces following Prigozhin's attempted coup.

=== Post Wagner Group rebellion ===
The “PMC Wagner Centre” sign was removed from the building on 1 July 2023.

A report by NORDSINT on 13 September 2023 states that the PMC Wagner Centre and the Wagner Group had remained completely inactive within the building, stating that the building space was currently being leased as office space to other companies in Saint Petersburg. The ownership of the building remained with JSC Retail, the company that was formed by Yevgeny Prigozhin in 2019.

Despite reductions in online - as well as physical activity, recent activities by the Wagner Group demonstrate that the PMC Wagner Centre is still in operation due to a livestream that occurred on 13 November 2023. The livestream was held on Telegram, and according to NORDSINT, characteristics of the background in the livestream align with video tours published of the Wagner Centre on YouTube. The livestream ultimately confirms that the Wagner Centre is still physically in operation with the Wagner Group.

=== Nationalization of Wagner Group ===
On 13 November 2023, it was reported that four former inmates who fought for the Wagner Group in eastern Ukraine have been receiving calls and text messages offering them military contracts. Three of the veterans reported that specifically Rosgvardia was trying to recruit them. A text message said: "Wagner is officially becoming a unit of Rosgvardia...The entire structure, methods of work, and commanders remain the same."
