= Qahremanabad =

Qahremanabad قهرمان اباد
- Village
- Location within Iran
- Coordinates: 36°56′31″N 57°36′27″E
- Country: Iran
- Province: North Khorasan
- County: Esfarayen
- Bakhsh: Central
- Rural District: Azari

Population (2006)
  - Total: 435
- Time zone: UTC+3:30 (IRST)
  - Summer (DST): UTC+4:30 (IRDT)

Qahremanabad (Persian: قهرمان اباد, also Romanized as Qahremānābād; also known as Ālīās) is a village in Azari Rural District, in the Central District of Esfarayen County, North Khorasan Province, Iran. At the 2006 census, its population was 435, in 101 families.
