= African Initiative =

Russian state-linked media outlet operating in Africa

- Type: News agency
- Founded: September 2023
- Founder: Viktor Lukovenko
- Headquarters: Moscow, Russia
- Area served: Africa
- Key people: Artyom Kureev (director-general)
- Website: afrinz.ru

African Initiative is a Russian news agency based in Moscow that targets audiences in Africa. Founded in September 2023, it presents itself as an independent outlet building an "information bridge between Russia and Africa." It has been characterized as a state-linked propaganda and disinformation operation, with identified ties to Russian intelligence services and the Wagner Group's successor, the Africa Corps.

== History and ownership ==
The outlet was founded by former Wagner fighter Viktor Lukovenko and is led by director-general Artyom Kureev; researchers have also identified deputies including Maksim Reva and Anna Zamaraeva, a former Wagner Centre spokesperson. It operates a multilingual website and social media channels alongside a network of local NGOs and pro-Russian community groups, beginning in Burkina Faso, and has sponsored press tours for African journalists to Moscow. Its content has promoted anti-Western and pro-Kremlin narratives, including criticism of "neocolonialism", and has included vaccine misinformation and content supporting military juntas.

A June 2025 joint investigation by France's VIGINUM, the European External Action Service, and the UK's Foreign, Commonwealth and Development Office concluded that African Initiative's leadership has ties to Russian intelligence services and it functions as a front for state-directed foreign information manipulation and interference (FIMI) rather than being an independent news organization. The outlet does not publish financial reports and appears to rely on Russian state-linked support rather than commercial revenue.

== Sanctions ==
In December 2024, the European Union sanctioned African Initiative and Kureev for spreading Russian propaganda and disinformation. In July 2025, the United Kingdom sanctioned Lukovenko, Kureev and Zamaraeva for their roles in the project.

== See also ==
- RT (TV network)
