= East StratCom Task Force =

European anti-disinformation group

The East StratCom Task Force (ESCTF or ESTF) is a part of the European External Action Service, focused on "effective communication" and promotion of European Union activities in Eastern Europe (including Armenia, Azerbaijan, Belarus, Georgia, Moldova, and Ukraine) and beyond (Russia). The task force's flagship project is EUvsDisinfo, a database of articles, media, and analysis of foreign information manipulation and interference (FIMI).

== History and mission ==
The ESCTF was created as a conclusion of the European Council meeting on 19 and 20 March 2015, citing the "need to challenge Russia's ongoing disinformation campaigns". Initially, it relied on donations from European countries and consisted of ten people, of whom only one (a former Czech journalist) worked full time. Funding from the EU budget began in 2018.

The East StratCom Task Force is intended to communicate about issues where EU strategic communication needs to be improved, or the EU is subject to disinformation campaigns. Such products will be put at the disposal of the EU's political leadership, press services, EU delegations and EU member states and are intended for the general public. The group is designated to develop communication campaigns, targeting key audiences and focused on specific issues of relevance to those audiences, including local issues. The actions of the ESTF are built on existing work and coherent with wider EU communication efforts, including activities of the EU institutions and EU member states.

The ESTF is one of several organizations with the purpose of opposing propaganda that attempts to undermine the norms and collective identity of the European Union, particularly propaganda from Russia. Its motto "Question even more" is a response to RT's "Question more".

== Products and activity ==
The team's communications products are mainly focused on the countries of the Eastern Neighbourhood and produced in the local languages of those countries. They are disseminated via the social media channels of the EU Delegations in the region, and are also carried on television and via other media and public events. In addition, the Task Force, in cooperation with the European Commission, led the EU's six-month Eastern Partnership communications campaign culminating in the November 2017 Eastern Partnership Summit in Brussels.

The team's main product to raise awareness of disinformation is the weekly Disinformation Review (in English and Russian languages), launched in November 2015. The goal is to provide data for analysts, journalists and officials dealing with this issue. The Disinformation Review also brings the latest news and analyses of what the task force labels as "pro-Kremlin disinformation". The full record of the Task Force's work on disinformation is available on its website EUvsDisinfo.eu, available in English, Russian, and German languages. The team also runs the European External Action Service's Russian language website, as well as Twitter and Facebook accounts. This communicates primarily about the EU's foreign policy by publishing information about EU activities, as well as EU statements and press releases with relevance to the Eastern Neighbourhood in particular. Most of the organization's efforts are distributed on providing information support on issues related to the Russo-Ukrainian War. One of the ESTF's main challenges has been described as distinguishing disinformation from legitimate dissent.

ESCTF has documented numerous examples of propaganda and disinformation published by Russian media. Between 2015 and 2016 EUvsDisinfo registered 1,992 confirmed disinformation cases with 36 each week on average. Between November 2015 and August 2019, the project identified more than 6,000 cases of disinformation. Among the most common topics was the topic of migration. As of March 2024, 943 cases of disinformation were related to the COVID-19 pandemic and 2855 cases related to the war in Ukraine.

== Reception ==
EU Member State Governments have strongly supported the Task Force since its inception and provide the majority of its staff.

The European Parliament has consistently supported the Task Force and called for adequate staffing and resourcing. An EP preparatory action for 2018 – "StratCom Plus" - has allocated €1.1m for the team to focus on how to counter disinformation on the EU more systematically.

- Pavel Telička, Vice-President of the European Parliament: "I place great value in the fact that Europe has experts who address Russia's ongoing disinformation campaigns (…). The quality and the substance of their work is outstanding. Their work is valuable as it indicated the alarming nature of our European security".
- Keir Giles from Chatham House about East StratCom Task Force: "a critically important capability, ESTF has quite a high credit among experts".
- European Security Union Commissioner Julian King noted that East StratCom Task Force "gathered more than 3,500 examples of pro-Kremlin disinformation contradicting publicly available facts repeated on many languages on many occasions"; "It also launched a Russian language service from Brussels, providing updates and fact-based background information about the Union for RU language journalists. The aim is to increase visibility and more accurate representation of EU policies in the Russian language media. It produces a weekly Disinformation review. Their Twitter account ensures that the Task Force's products reach up to 2 million people per month, in addition to their regular briefings. This work is very important".
- Rebecca Harms, Member of the European Parliament (MEP) from Germany and member of the Greens group: "It's important to have this StratCom, but its interaction with national bodies is not strong enough".
- Former Danish Foreign Minister Uffe Ellemann-Jensen said that: "They provide an excellent instrument. We would of course not be able to do it in other ways".
- Former Czech Prime Minister Bohuslav Sobotka: "This team is capable of generating quality results".
- Edward Lucas, vice president at Center for European Policy Analysis (CEPA), said that the East StratCom's Disinformation Review is "the best weekly bulletin on Russian propaganda in the West" next after Ukrainian similar project, StopFake, which he considers to be "the gold standard".
- According to The New York Times, East StratCom serves as "Europe's front line against this onslaught of fake news".
- Canadian Maclean's magazine: "As for who first noticed that Moscow was gunning for Freeland, that's something that has yet to show up in any banner Canadian headlines. It was the European Union's East StratCom Task Force, a unit of the External Action Service (the EU's foreign ministry and diplomatic branch). The Task Force was set up in March 2015 as a kind of early warning system to detect incoming Kremlin disinformation campaigns".
- Brussels-based online newspaper EUobserver: "Eight member states have urged the EU's foreign service to significantly expand its work on countering Russian propaganda. They said in a letter to EU head of foreign affairs Federica Mogherini that "in the face of unabated third party disinformation campaigns … we see an urgent need to further enhance the EU's StratCom capabilities (…) East StratCom circulates online notes that debunk Russian disinformation and has attracted 30,000 followers to its Twitter account. It also promotes positive coverage of the EU in former Soviet states". More in EUobserver: "Its Disinformation Review, a weekly newsletter, and its daily tweets and infographics, should be in the laptops and phones of all MEPs and senior EU officials".
- Lawfare, about the team: "The task force has made some meaningful contributions to the efforts to counter disinformation warfare. Over the course of its operation, East StratCom has identified over 3,500 disinformation cases (…) These statistics highlight the global nature of the problem, and the benefit of having a body working on disinformation beyond a single country's borders. East StratCom's supranational view also allows it to provide valuable insights into the broader strategy and goals of pro-Kremlin disinformation operations because it can see them as a cohesive whole, rather than isolated incidents in individual countries.

=== Criticism ===
The ESTF has been described as "possibly the most widely recognised, and criticised, anti-disinformation unit set up to handle Russian disinformation." In 2020, The New York Times wrote that the ESTF "is unique because its biggest supporters — countries in Central and Eastern Europe with a history of Communist influence — are also among its loudest critics. They say the task force has been underfunded and undersupported and should be more ambitious."

Danish newspaper Politiken criticized East StratCom for writing that Russian-backed militants were fighting in Ukraine at the Battle of Avdiivka. They said that ESTF only used Ukrainian sources in their review, and claimed that one of the sources (the Ukrainian website Inform Napalm) was linked to the "controversial and secretive" Ukrainian website Myrotvorets.

In 2018, it was found that the ESTF's database of news articles that contain disinformation had incorrectly included three articles from Dutch news outlets, in part due to a translation error. The outlets (GeenStijl, The Post Online and De Gelderlander) sued the EU for libel. On 6 March, the Dutch Parliament passed a motion to advocate that the EU remove the ESTF's funding. In response, the ESTF removed the articles from their database and changed the language it uses when describing outlets that it identifies as publishing disinformation. On 9 March, Dutch Minister of the Interior, who had previously opposed closing EUvsDisinfo, said that the government would make a case for closing it in the European Union. Professor Wouter Hins from Leiden University admitted that EUvsDisinfo made a mistake, but argued that it should not be closed: "The idea that the government should then shut up is rather unworldly". On 13 March the three Dutch media withdrew their case.

== See also ==
- Counterpropaganda
- Fact checking
- Fake news
- Russia–European Union relations
