= List of foreign electoral interventions =

Below is a list of foreign electoral interventions by country.

== Albania ==
=== 1991 election (by United States) ===
During the 1991 election campaign, politicians of the center-right Democratic Party of Albania claimed that the US government would provide financial assistance to the country. The US government confirmed these claims in a meeting with Democratic Party members.

=== 1992 election (by United States and Italy) ===
The United States Agency for International Development, National Democrat Institute and the International Republican Institute provided anti-socialist political groups with aid, training, media support and funding. The US embassy also publicly supported the Democratic Party of Albania. The Los Angeles Times also reported that the US government provided advisors and vehicles to the campaign of the Democratic Party of Albania, and threatened to withhold foreign aid to Albania if the Socialist Party of Albania was victorious in the elections.

Italy supported the Socialist Party of Albania, with Italian former prime minister Bettino Craxi accepting honorary membership in the party to give them legitimacy. Italy also gave more aid to Albania than any other country.

== Argentina ==
=== 2007 election (by Venezuela) ===
In August 2007, Venezuelan-American businessman Guido Alejandro Antonini Wilson arrived in Argentina on a private flight carrying US$790,550 in undeclared cash. The money was discovered by customs authorities, sparking the Suitcase Scandal (Valijagate). The incident led to speculation that the funds were intended to finance the presidential campaign of Cristina Fernández de Kirchner. However, no conclusive evidence was presented to confirm this claim, and the case was closed in 2015 due to the statute of limitations.

In 2021, former Venezuelan intelligence chief Hugo Carvajal alleged that Hugo Chávez’s government had sent funds to Argentina, mentioning Néstor Kirchner specifically. These claims reignited debates over possible illicit financing, but no direct evidence has emerged linking Cristina Fernández de Kirchner to receiving money from Chávez.

=== 2025 election (by United States and Russia) ===
In October 2025, US president Donald Trump announced that he might cut off financial aid to Argentina if Javier Milei lost a crucial legislative election later that month. Milei would later win the legislative election.

The Milei government accused a “non-institutional intelligence operation” of illegally recording and leaking private audio conversations (including those of Karina Milei) to destabilize the electoral process. The government alleged foreign influence, citing “patterns similar to operations attributed to Russian and chavista interests.” Russia formally denied the accusations.

== Armenia ==
=== 2026 parliamentary election (by Russia) ===
Ahead of the June 7, 2026 parliamentary elections, Russia conducted a broad hybrid interference campaign aimed at preventing the ruling Civil Contract party, led by Prime Minister Nikol Pashinyan, from winning. The campaign sought to reverse Armenia's westward geopolitical pivot following Yerevan's effective suspension of its CSTO membership in 2024 and the National Assembly's adoption of a law on EU membership aspirations in March 2025.

Researchers at EUvsDisinfo, Foundation for Defense of Democracies (FDD), Clemson University's Media Forensics Hub, the French government agency VIGINUM and investigative outlet The Insider documented at least three major Kremlin-linked disinformation networks operating simultaneously against the Armenian electorate. The Storm-1516 network, associated with Russian GRU and staffed by former employees of Yevgeny Prigozhin's troll factory, produced fabricated narratives at twice the rate of the previous year, including a false claim that Pashinyan had embezzled $11 million from EAEU digitalization funds. Other documented techniques included Doppelgänger — fake websites mimicking CNN, Reuters and BBC branding — and Matryoshka, a technique targeting fact-checkers with false verification requests.

Russian intelligence officers operating under diplomatic cover at the Russian Embassy in Yerevan were identified by The Insider as coordinating political and covert operations. According to the investigation, Kremlin political technologists financed opposition candidates through opaque channels, including a restructured unit within the Presidential Administration of Russia headed by Vadim Titov under Sergey Kiriyenko. Vladimir Putin personally pressured Pashinyan during an April 2026 Moscow meeting to allow jailed Russian-Armenian tycoon Samvel Karapetyan to participate in the elections, a request Pashinyan refused on constitutional grounds.

The Parliamentary Assembly of the Council of Europe (PACE), following a May 11–12 visit to Yerevan, described the foreign interference as "more complex and systemic" than in previous Armenian elections. The Renew Europe group in the European Parliament passed a resolution on April 30, 2026 calling for strong international observation and cybersecurity protection of electoral infrastructure. The International Republican Institute (IRI) identified illicit campaign financing, information manipulation, and Russian influence operations as the primary risks to the integrity of the vote. The Platform of Russian Democratic Forces at PACE condemned the Kremlin's attempts to use the approximately one million Armenian citizens living in Russia as a lever of political pressure, describing it as "political blackmail".

== Australia ==
=== 2019 election (by China) ===
In late 2019, media outlets around the world have reported on alleged efforts by the People's Republic of China to infiltrate the Parliament of Australia by recruiting a spy to run in a constituency during the 2019 Australian federal election.

=== 2022 election (by China) ===
In February 2022, the Australian Security Intelligence Organisation revealed a failed attempt by the Chinese government to use a proxy to finance federal Labor candidates in New South Wales.

=== 2025 election (by Russia and China) ===
Australia’s 2025 federal election was subject to significant foreign-interference activity attributed to Russia and China. The campaigns involved coordinated online disinformation — including efforts to “poison” AI chatbots with propaganda via a pro-Russian network, foreign espionage, unlawful intelligence-gathering, and misuse of diaspora community surveillance. Authorities disrupted dozens of espionage and interference operations in the years preceding the election, and in 2025 publicly charged at least one individual linked to China under foreign-interference laws. While there is no public evidence that the vote count was altered, the case illustrates a modern hybrid interference approach: using cyber-espionage, disinformation, AI manipulation and clandestine influence operations.

== Austria ==
=== 1938 referendum (by Nazi Germany) ===
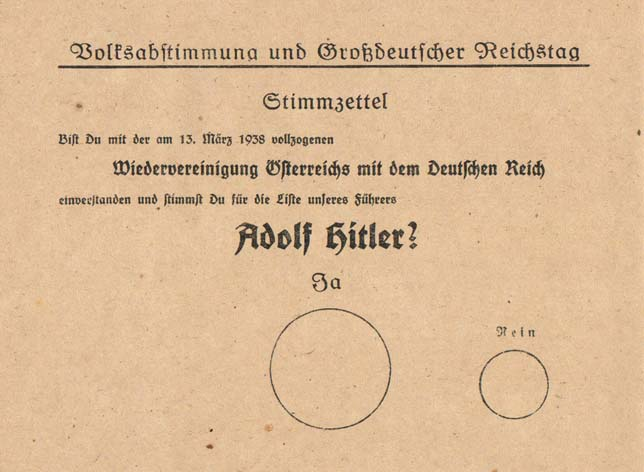
Ballot for the 1938 referendum with a larger circle for the "Yes" option.

The referendum took place after the Anschluss. A referendum proposed by the Austrian government if there should be a "Free, German, Independent and Social, Christian and United Austria" was cancelled due to German pressure. The referendum was held under massive pressure, rigging and exclusion of voters (like Jews). Nevertheless, the majority would have probably supported the annexation as many Austrians who were not Nazis supported the unification.

=== 1949 election (by Soviet Union) ===
The Soviet part of the Allied Commission for Austria (SČSKA) supported the legalization of the Federation of Independents and the Democratic Union hoping to weaken the Austrian People's Party (ÖVP) and they forced the Communist Party of Austria (KPÖ) to form a coalition with the Left Socialists.

=== 1953 election (by Soviet Union) ===
The SČSKA supported the campaign of the Austrian People's Opposition, a coalition consisting of the KPÖ, Left Socialists (meant to replace the Socialist Party of Austria) and the Democratic Union (meant to replace the ÖVP).

== Bangladesh ==
=== 1973 election (by Soviet Union) ===
According to details from the Mitrokhin Archive, the Soviet Union covertly supported the Awami League in Bangladesh.

== Bolivia ==
=== 1964 election (by United States) ===
According to documents provided by the State Department Office of the Historian, the CIA covertly financed media, political groups, trade unions, student groups and youth groups in order to break the influence of communists and alleged Cuban operatives in Bolivia, as well as to create a stable government that was pro-USA. Over $1,150,000 was dedicated to this task across 3 years. Starting in August 1964, the US government began to covertly fund the MNR (then the largest political party in Bolivia) during the elections. Following the 1964 military coup by General René Barrientos the US government covertly funded him and propaganda supporting his government.

=== 1966 election (by United States) ===
According to documents provided by the State Department Office of the Historian, the CIA covertly funded groups supporting General Barrientos during the 1966 elections and his rivals in order to ensure they'd accept the legitimacy of the elections. With CIA assistance, Barrientos forces killed Che Guevara the next year.

=== 2002 election (by United States and Cuba) ===
In the Bolivian elections of 2002, the U.S., which had been financing the eradication of coca farms, instructed Ambassador Manuel Rocha to warn Bolivians against voting for socialist candidate Evo Morales, stating that doing so could "jeopardize American assistance and investment." USAID also created the "political party reform project" in Bolivia in 2002, whose aim was to "help build moderate, pro-democracy political parties that can serve as a counterweight to the radical MAS or its successors". The move largely backfired, increasing support for Morales, who finished second in the election. Morales would ultimately be elected president of Bolivia in 2006. In 2023, Rocha was arrested for spying for Cuba leading to the theory that he intended to back Morales.

== Brazil ==
=== 1955 election (by United States) ===
Fearing a rise of João Goulart, who the US considered to be a communist demagogue, the United States Information Service increased its budget to educate Brazilians on the alleged dangers of communism and communist front groups, as well as drawing links between the Brazilian Communist Party and the Soviet Union. The US also gave grants to the conservative National Democratic Union. According to documents provided by the State Department Office of the Historian, the USA also provided an increase in credit to the ruling administration to help them win the 1955 elections.

=== 1962 election (by United States) ===
According to Tim Weiner's book Legacy of Ashes, the first use of the brand-new state-of-the-art taping system ordered by John F. Kennedy in the White House in 1962 was to discuss plans to subvert the Brazilian government of João Goulart. Kennedy and his ambassador to Brazil Lincoln Gordon discussed spending $8 million to swing the next elections and to prepare for a military coup against Goulart due to fears Brazil could become a "second Cuba". The CIA and AFL-CIO pushed money into Brazilian political life to people who opposed Goulart. Electoral interference by the US failed to oust Goulart, and the CIA supported a coup that deposed him in 1964, leading to Brazil being ruled by a military dictatorship until 1985.

=== 2026 election (by United States, Argentina and Russia) ===
During the 2026 Brazilian election campaign, the United States was accused by the Brazilian government of attempting to influence the election in favor of Flávio Bolsonaro, including through pressure on Brazil's electoral system and sanctions against Brazilian officials. Donald Trump and members of his administration openly supported Bolsonaro's political camp. Argentine President Javier Milei also publicly endorsed Flávio Bolsonaro and criticized Luiz Inácio Lula da Silva and the Brazilian judiciary. Brazilian authorities described the actions as foreign interference.

Russia was accused of attempting to interfere in the electoral process. In September 2026, officials from the Brazilian Intelligence Agency (ABIN) reportedly informed French and German delegations that they had identified interference by Russia and the United States. However, no specific details or evidence of the alleged Russian operations were publicly disclosed. The Superior Electoral Court subsequently stated that it had found no evidence of foreign interference in the first round of voting.

== Bulgaria ==
=== 1945 election (by Soviet Union, United States and United Kingdom) ===
Due to communist control, the United States and United Kingdom intervened in the Allied Commission to postpone the election threatening to not recognise the new government. The election results were likely fraudulent and William Houstoun-Boswall believed that they manipulated according to Soviet Objectives.

=== 1946 election (by Soviet Union) ===
Joseph Stalin gave instructions to the Bulgarian Communist Party. Despite the situation, the opposition still managed to win 28.4% of the vote and 99 seats.

=== 2017 election (by Turkey) ===
The Turkish ambassador to Bulgaria appeared in a party election broadcast of Democrats for Responsibility, Solidarity and Tolerance. Prime Minister Boyko Borisov called the involvement "unacceptable" and the leader of the Bulgarian Socialist Party Korneliya Ninova categorically denounced any involvement of foreign governments.

=== 2024 election (by Russia) ===
In the October 2024 parliamentary elections, allegations of Russian interference surfaced as pro-Russian parties, such as the ultranationalist Vazrazhdane (Revival), gained significant electoral traction. Analysts estimated that parties with Russian ties could secure around 25% of the vote, raising concerns about Moscow’s influence in Bulgarian politics. The election occurred amid political instability, with seven elections held in four years. Observers from the European Union and the United States expressed doubts over potential external manipulation, while the Kremlin denied any involvement.

=== 2026 election (by Russia) ===
Ahead of the 2026 Bulgarian parliamentary election, Russian-linked information operations targeted the electoral environment through disinformation and narratives portraying the European Union as interfering in Bulgaria's elections. Researchers identified Kremlin-aligned networks including the Pravda network, RT-linked outlets and other websites amplifying anti-EU narratives and attempting to undermine trust in the electoral process. The Center for the Study of Democracy reported that coordinated information operations generated more than 340 million impressions during the campaign. Bulgarian authorities established a special mechanism to counter foreign information manipulation and interference.

== Canada ==
=== 1962 and 1963 (by United States) ===
Canadian prime minister John Diefenbaker (a Conservative) had famously bad relations with U.S. president John F. Kennedy. Kennedy is widely seen as having publicly intervened in Canadian affairs by inviting the then-opposition leader Lester B. Pearson (a Liberal) to the White House for a banquet with Nobel Prize winners just before the official start of 1962 campaign, failing to rescind the offer when the election was formally called, holding a private meeting with Pearson in the White House, and mentioning only Pearson in his remarks to the Nobel laureates. In the aftermath of the Cuban Missile crisis, Diefenbaker's policy was attacked by the U.S. State department in a statement which McGeorge Bundy bragged had "toppled" the Diefenbaker government. The U.S. embassy in Ottawa leaked anti-Diefenbaker stories to the media covering the campaign and the Kennedy-friendly Newsweek magazine ran cover story attacking Diefenbaker. Besides these public interventions, Kennedy secretly sent his personal pollster Lou Harris to work for Pearson's Liberals under an assumed name, despite refusing to allow Harris to work for the British Labour Party under Harold Wilson. "One of the highlights of my life,” Mr. Harris told The Canadian Press, “was helping Pearson defeat Diefenbaker."

=== 2019 election (by China) ===
The Canadian Security Intelligence Service (CSIS) warned Liberal Party leader Justin Trudeau that Chinese Communist Party-affiliated proxies had covertly funded at least 11 federal candidates in the 2019 election. Four months after the 2019 Canadian federal election, the Privy Council Office warned that election interference by China was "likely to be more persistent and pervasive in future elections." In February 2023, CSIS concluded that the Chinese government interfered in the 2019 election.

=== 2021 election (by China) ===
The Rapid Response Mechanism Canada reported that it detected Chinese Communist Party (CCP) disinformation operations to dissuade voters from supporting the Conservative Party of Canada during the 2021 federal election. Kenny Chiu, an outspoken critic of Chinese government's crackdown on dissent and protest in Hong Kong, was a key target of this disinformation campaign. CSIS also produced reports on the Chinese government's strategy to interfere in Canada's 2021 federal election. As a result of a 2021 CSIS report documenting threats to Michael Chong and his family, Chinese diplomat Zhao Wei was expelled from Canada in 2023. In February 2023, CSIS concluded that the Chinese government interfered in the 2021 elections.

=== 2022 election (by China) ===
According to The Globe and Mail, CSIS determined that China's consul-general in Vancouver, Tong Xiaoling, mentored pro-Beijing candidates to run in the 2022 Vancouver municipal election.

=== 2022 leadership election (by India) ===
In March 2025, The Globe and Mail reported that the CSIS believed that agents affiliated with government of India assisted Pierre Poilievre's leadership bid in 2022 Conservative Party of Canada leadership election by fundraising and organizing support for Poilievre.

=== 2025 election (by United States, China, Russia, India and Pakistan) ===
For the federal elections of April 28, 2025, Canadian intelligence agencies warned that China, India, Russia, and Pakistan posed a concrete threat of interference through AI, disinformation, bots, espionage, and hack-and-leak operations. Furthermore, U.S. president Donald J. Trump waged a campaign of diplomatic pressure and rhetoric—proposing the annexation of Canada as the “51st state,” imposing tariffs, and undermining Canadian sovereignty—which many analysts interpreted as an attempt to politically influence the electorate. Trump even commented on election day that voters should vote for “the candidate who will make us the 51st state.”

== Chile ==
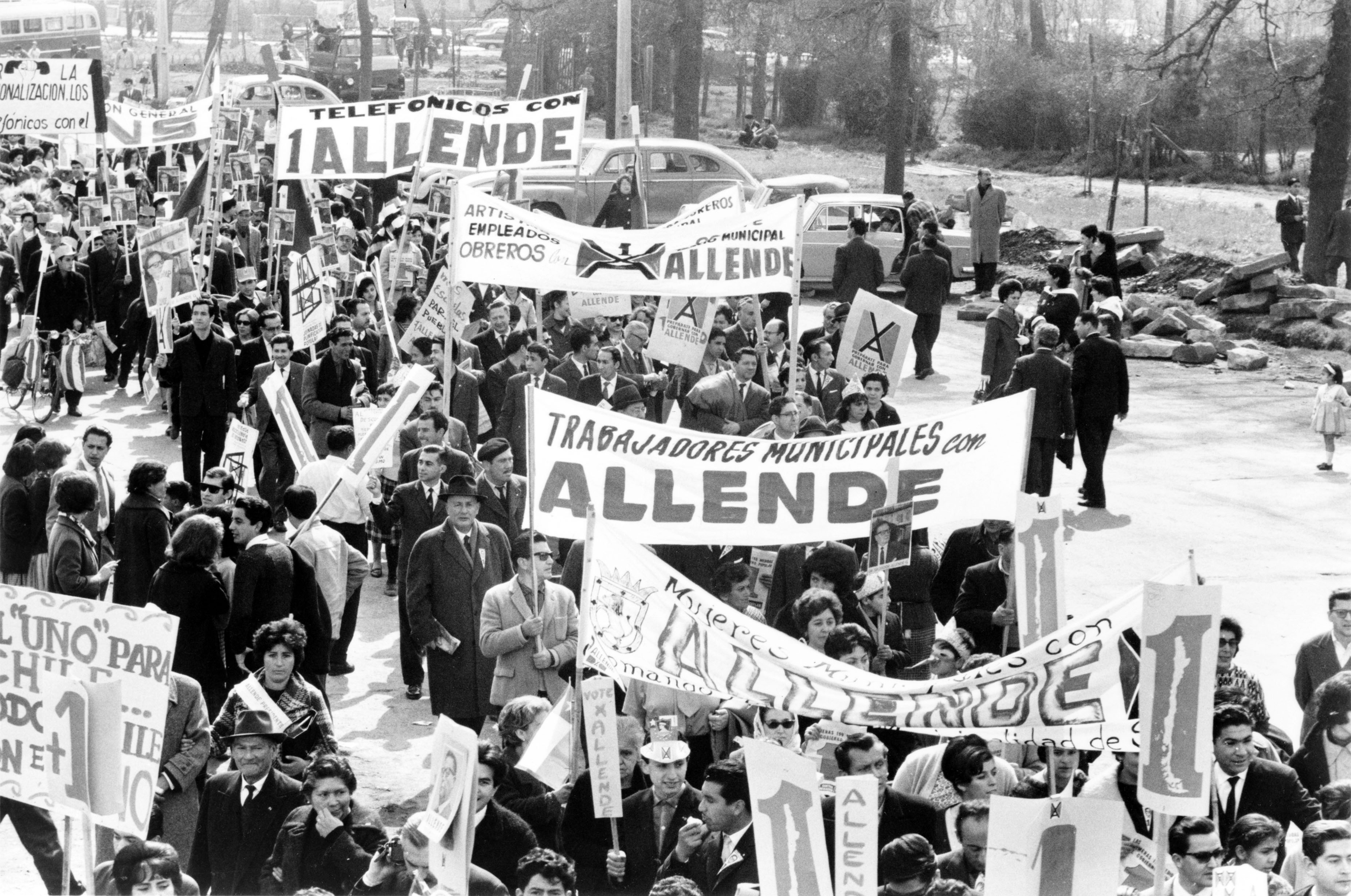
Chilean workers marching in support of Allende in 1964.

=== 1964 election (by United States and Soviet Union) ===
Between 1960 and 1969, the Soviet government funded the Communist Party of Chile at a rate of between $50,000 and $400,000 annually. In the 1964 Chilean elections the U.S. government supplied $2.6 million in funding for candidate Eduardo Frei Montalva, whose opponent, Salvador Allende was a prominent Marxist, as well as additional funding with the intention of harming Allende's reputation. As Kristian Gustafson phrased the situation:

It was clear the Soviet Union was operating in Chile to ensure Marxist success, and from the contemporary American point of view, the United States was required to thwart this enemy influence: Soviet money and influence were clearly going into Chile to undermine its democracy, so U.S. funding would have to go into Chile to frustrate that pernicious influence.

The U.S. involvement was later revealed by the Church Committee in 1975.

=== 1970 election (by United States and Soviet Union) ===
According to information released as part of the findings of the Church Committee, the U.S. Central Intelligence Agency supported the kidnapping of the Chilean Army Commander-in-Chief General René Schneider in an attempt to prevent the congressional confirmation of Salvador Allende. The attempt failed and Schneider was shot in the process. He died three days later from his wounds. Thereafter, the U.S. continued a vigorous overt and covert campaign to undermine Allende's Presidency, which may have created the conditions for Allende's overthrow in a violent coup, although the U.S. was not directly implicated in the coup. American official Henry Kissinger was quoted by Newsweek in 1974 saying this about Chile: "I don't see why we have to let a country go communist due to the irresponsibility of its own people".

According to details from the Mitrokhin Archive, the Soviet Union covertly supported Salvador Allende.

=== 2025 election (by United States) ===
In the wake of the December 14, 2025 presidential runoff in Chile, U.S. President Donald J. Trump publicly claimed credit for part of ultra-conservative candidate José Antonio Kast electoral victory, asserting that Kast’s win was influenced by his own support. Trump said that Kast “was the person I supported” and that he learned Kast “ended up winning fairly easily,” implying that his backing contributed to the outcome — remarks made during a press conference and widely reported in Chilean media. These public statements went beyond standard diplomatic congratulations by framing the U.S. president as having played a role in shaping the election result.

== Colombia ==
=== 2022 election (by Venezuela) ===
During Colombia's 2022 presidential election, concerns were raised about potential interference from Venezuela, Russia, and Cuba. U.S. ambassador to Colombia, Philip Goldberg, warned that these countries could attempt to influence the election through disinformation campaigns and online propaganda. Additionally, reports emerged of electoral disruptions along the Colombia-Venezuela border. Complaints were made regarding barriers set up by Venezuelan authorities near the Simón Bolívar International Bridge, which allegedly restricted access for Colombian voters living in Venezuela. Venezuelan officials defended these measures as efforts to maintain order, but critics viewed them as a potential form of interference.

=== 2026 election (by United States, Ecuador and Israel) ===
During the 2026 Colombian presidential election, U.S. President Donald Trump openly endorsed right-wing candidate Abelardo de la Espriella before the June 21 runoff. Trump described the election as “very important” to Colombia’s future and its relationship with the United States, later stating that Colombia would receive the “full support and strength” of the United States if De la Espriella won. Colombian President Gustavo Petro accused Trump of interfering in the election and argued that foreign political intervention violated Colombia’s electoral sovereignty. Trump’s intervention constituted an unusually direct public endorsement by a foreign head of state, although there is no evidence that the United States manipulated Colombia’s voting or vote-counting systems. Shortly before the election, the Ecuadorian President Daniel Noboa announced that Ecuador would lift security tariffs on Colombian imports after speaking with De la Espriella. Noboa stated that the decision followed De la Espriella’s commitment to cooperate with Ecuador against narcoterrorism and to facilitate the transfer of Ecuadorian criminals held in Colombia. The announcement was made two days before the Colombian presidential vote and was publicized through De la Espriella’s campaign. The Colombian Foreign Ministry subsequently accused Ecuador of “deliberate interference” in Colombia’s electoral process, arguing that the Ecuadorian government had improperly presented the tariff decision as a political concession to a presidential candidate. Ecuador rejected the characterization, while Colombian authorities maintained that the timing and political framing of the measure constituted interference. Israel was also accused by Petro of interfering in the election through alleged manipulation of electoral software. In August 2026, Petro claimed that electoral irregularities had been detected in thousands of polling stations and alleged that Colombia had experienced electoral manipulation involving Israeli software. He described the alleged operation as part of a broader pattern of elections supposedly manipulated through Israeli technology. However, these allegations have not been independently verified, and Colombia’s electoral authorities certified De la Espriella’s victory. The available evidence therefore supports describing the Israeli connection as an allegation rather than a proven foreign-interference operation.

== Congo-Kinshasa ==
=== 1960 election (by Soviet Union, 1960) ===
The Soviet Union covertly supported the campaign of Patrice Lumumba's Mouvement National Congolais party. Shortly after Lumumba's victory, the Congo Crisis broke out and Lumumba was assassinated in January 1961. This paved the way for the dictatorship of Mobutu Sese Seko.

== Costa Rica ==
=== 1966 election (by United States and Nicaragua) ===
According to documents provided by the State Department Office of the Historian, National Liberation Party (PLN) leader Daniel Oduber Quirós actively sought out support from the United States and his party during the elections. There was also common speculation in Costa Rica that the National Unification Party (PUN) was being funded by outside forces, notably the Somoza family in Nicaragua. The US government offered to use contacts in the AFL-CIO to assist the PLN in their election campaign. Walter and Victor Reuther provided assistance to the campaign by collecting funds in Detroit. The US government preferred a PLN victory, but acknowledged both candidates were pro-USA and anti-communist.

=== 1970 election (by Soviet Union) ===
The KGB quietly aided the presidential campaign of José Figueres Ferrer by providing his campaign a loan of $300,000 via the Marxist-Leninist People's Vanguard Party in return for a promise of diplomatic recognition of the Soviet Union. Once reinstalled as President, Figueres kept his promise.

=== 1986 election (by United States) ===
The International Republican Institute supported the conservative Social Christian Unity Party (PUSC) to help them win the 1986 elections. They also gave them grants of $75,000, $100,000 and $145,000 in 1986, 1987 and 1988 respectively to the "Asociación para la Defensa de la Libertad y Democracia en Costa Rica" (Association for the Defense of Liberty and Democracy in Costa Rica) a conservative political group.

== Czechoslovakia ==
=== 1935 election (by Nazi Germany) ===
The Sudeten German Party received financial backing from Germany. The German foreign ministry paid back a credit of 330,000 Reichsmark the party took.

=== 1946 election (by Soviet Union) ===
The election was seen as mostly free and fair. In Slovakia, the non-communist Democratic Party won more than 60% and despite outperforming expectations, the Communist Party of Czechoslovakia was unable to win a majority. Only members of the National Front were allowed to compete in the election. Bourgeois parties like the Republican Party of Farmers and Peasants were banned and no Hungarian or German party existed. The parties agreed not to discuss neither president Edvard Beneš, the Soviet Union nor foreign politics.

=== 1990 election (by United States, United Kingdom, Germany and Belgium) ===
According to The New York Times, National Endowment for Democracy (NED) funding for political parties was considered controversial in Czechoslovakia, as it was seen as foreign interference favoring political parties close to Vaclav Havel. The NED provided $400,000 in grants, much of which were used to buy computers, fax machines and copiers that were helpful in the campaign. The British Conservative Party also provided 2 campaign experts, and Christian Democrat parties in Belgium and Germany sent more electronics.

== Danzig ==
=== 1935 election (by Nazi Germany) ===
The NSDAP had financial backing from the German government and Joseph Goebbels, Rudolf Hess, Hermann Göring and Bernhard Rust campaigned for the party. The campaign of the other parties was suppressed by the City government. Despite open fraud, the final election results were seen as a disappointment for the Nazis and they failed to reach the super-majority.

== Denmark ==
=== 1943 election (by Nazi Germany) ===
During the German Occupation of Denmark, regular elections were held in accordance to the constitution. The German-funded National Socialist Workers' Party of Denmark (DNSAP) only received 2.2% and just 3 seats like in the election before and thus far below expectations despite the absence of the German Schleswig Party. Germany then founded Schalburg Corps as a replacement for the DNSAP.

=== 1973 election (by Soviet Union) ===
The Soviet Union covertly funded the Communist Party of Denmark in the 1973 elections.

=== 1975 election (by Soviet Union) ===
The Soviet Union covertly funded the Communist Party of Denmark in the 1975 elections.

== Dominican Republic ==
=== 1966 election (by United States) ===
According to documents provided by the State Department Office of the Historian, the US government supported the campaign of Joaquin Balaguer. The government planned to support him "in such a way that United States sponsorship cannot be proven in any way." Methods of supporting Balaguer include financial assistance, advice, media, information and classified forms of assistance.

== Ecuador ==
=== 2013 election (by Venezuela) ===
In 2021, investigations revealed that funds allegedly linked to Alex Saab, a businessman associated with the Venezuelan government, were funneled into Rafael Correa's 2013 presidential campaign. The funds were reportedly transferred through a network of companies and bank accounts, with the money originating from Venezuela. These revelations suggested a form of foreign interference in Ecuador’s elections, as the Venezuelan regime was accused of supporting Correa financially to influence the electoral outcome. Although these allegations emerged after the election, they highlighted potential external influence in the political process.

=== 2023 election (by Venezuela) ===
In January 2026, Ecuador's Attorney General's Office opened an investigation into allegations that illicit cash from Venezuela had been used to finance the campaign of Luisa González in the 2023 Ecuadorian general election. González, the candidate of the Citizen Revolution Movement, lost the presidential runoff to Daniel Noboa in October 2023. Prosecutors searched González's residence as part of the investigation, alleging that cash had entered Ecuador from Venezuela to finance her campaign. González denied receiving money from Venezuela, drug cartels or any other illicit source. The investigation concerned alleged foreign campaign financing, and the reported allegations had not established that the Government of Venezuela had directed an electoral interference operation.

=== 2025 election (by Venezuela) ===
Following the 2025 Ecuadorian general election, the government of Ecuador accused Venezuelan security agents of stealing Ecuadorian electoral materials in Venezuela. On 17 April 2025, Ecuador's Ministry of Foreign Affairs stated that armed individuals, allegedly identifying themselves as members of the Bolivarian National Intelligence Service (SEBIN), had seized unused electoral ballots being transported in diplomatic pouches for Ecuadorian voters in Caracas. The Government of Venezuela rejected the allegations, with Foreign Minister Yván Gil accusing Ecuador of making false claims to conceal its electoral failure. According to Reuters, the incident did not affect the election results, as voting in Venezuela had already been suspended by Ecuadorian authorities. The European Union Election Observation Mission described the 13 April presidential runoff as transparent and well-organised, rejecting allegations that fraud had affected the election outcome.

== El Salvador ==
=== 1984 election (by United States) ===
According to an article from The Washington Post, the US used diplomatic pressure, media support and covert funding to support the campaign of Jose Napoleon Duarte.

=== 2004 election (by United States) ===
The U.S. government under George W. Bush interfered in the elections by threatening a deterioration of the bilateral relations in case of a victory by FMLN's candidate Schafik Handal. Bush's Assistant Secretary of State for Western Hemisphere Affairs, Otto Reich, stated that the U.S. government was "concerned about the impact that an FMLN victory could have on the commercial, economic, and migration-related relations of the U.S. with El Salvador."

== Estonia ==
=== 1940 election (by Soviet Union) ===
The Soviet Union gave an ultimatum to Estonia. The Red Army then occupied the country. Opposition leaders were arrested to prevent competition to the sole communist list. There was no secret vote and the results were rigged. After the election, the communist parliament asked for admission to the USSR.

== Finland ==
=== 1956 election (by Soviet Union) ===
The Soviet Union overtly supported the electoral campaign of Urho Kekkonen in the 1956 elections.

=== 1962 election (by Soviet Union) ===
The Soviet Union overtly supported the electoral campaign of Urho Kekkonen in the 1962 elections.

== France ==
=== 1974 election (by Soviet Union) ===
According to details from the Mitrokhin Archive, the KGB undertook "active measures" against the campaign of Valéry Giscard d'Estaing.

=== 1988 election (by Soviet Union) ===
According to details from the Mitrokhin Archive, the Soviet Union provided 10 million francs to support the French Communist Party.

=== 2007 election (by Libya) ===
According to French newspaper Mediapart, Nicolas Sarkozy's presidential campaign received 50 million Euros in donations from the Libyan leader, colonel Muammar Gaddafi, which is over twice the French limit for individual campaign donations of 22 million Euros. After Sarkozy's victory, Gaddafi went on a 5-day state visit to France, during which the Libyan government purchased military equipment, including 14 Rafale fighter jets. Ziad Takieddine, a French-Lebanese businessman with close ties to Libya, admitted to Mediapart that he had made three trips from Tripoli to France to deliver suitcases filled with 200 and 500 euro notes to Sarkozy. After the election, Gaddafi was invited. In March 2018, Sarkozy was held in custody over these allegations. He was interrogated for 25 hours by the police, during which he denied any wrongdoing, before being released under special judicial supervision. Sarkozy was later found guilty and sentenced to five years in prison but was set free after just three weeks.

=== 2017 election (by Russia) ===
The 2017 Macron e-mail leaks were leaks of more than 20,000 e-mails related to the campaign of Emmanuel Macron during the 2017 French presidential elections, two days before the final vote. The leaks garnered an abundance of media attention due to how quickly news of the leak spread throughout the Internet, aided in large part by bots and spammers and drew accusations that the government of Russia under Vladimir Putin was responsible. The e-mails were shared by WikiLeaks and several American alt-right activists through social media sites like Twitter, Facebook, and 4chan.

=== 2027 election (by Russia) ===
Ahead of the 2027 French presidential election, French authorities attributed several disinformation operations targeting prospective presidential candidates to Russian-linked networks. In July and August 2026, Édouard Philippe, Raphaël Glucksmann and Gabriel Attal were targeted by fabricated articles, videos and websites impersonating French media outlets. Viginum, France's agency responsible for combating foreign digital interference, attributed some of the operations with high confidence to the pro-Russian Matryoshka network, while other operations were linked to Storm-1516, a network associated with Russian intelligence. French authorities and prosecutors investigated the campaigns as suspected foreign interference.

== Germany ==
East Germany supported the Communist Party of Germany (KPD) and supplied them at least 4.16 million DM by 1950. KPD was banned in 1956. In 1968, the German Communist Party was founded as a replacement and was likewise funded with about 62.5 million DM to 70 million DM annually. The Socialist Unity Party of West Berlin got 12.5 million DM and the German Peace Union got around 3 million DM allocated annually.

=== 1946 election (by Soviet Union) ===
The newspaper of the Communist Party of Germany (KPD) Deutsche Volkszeitung had the most copies (350,000) compared to the other parties which only had 250,000 copies each in 1945 and were met with censorship. Nonetheless the Socialist Unity Party of Germany (SED) failed to win a majority and in Berlin, the SED lost to the Social Democratic Party of Germany which had not been forcefully merged with KPD. The American Zone avoided the term fraud and American obversers noted that the election was indeed "free and fair" on the surface. The SMAD postponed the next state elections which were only held as one-list elections under the National Front.

=== 1953 election (by East Germany) ===
East Germany was able to forge an alliance between the All-German People's Party (GVP) and the Bund der Deutschen (BdD) but GVP rejected any involvement of the Communist Party of Germany. The East German Socialist Unity Party of Germany had funded the BdD. They only won 1.2% of the vote.

=== 1957 election (by East Germany) ===
4,000 East German agitators campaigned to present chancellor Konrad Adenauer's policy as leading to a nuclear war. The campaign was unsuccessful and his CDU/CSU bloc ended up with 50.2% gaining 5%.

=== 1961 election (by East Germany) ===
East Germany heavily financed and controlled the German Peace Union and affiliates of the East German Ministry for State Security were part of the leadership. They only won 1.9% of the vote.

=== 1965 election (by East Germany) ===
The Socialist Unity Party of Germany (SED) gave contradicting instructions while some called communists to vote for the Social Democratic Party of Germany others like Walter Ulbricht publicly endorsed the German Peace Union. The SED mostly focused their attacks on CDU/CSU.

=== 1969 election (by East Germany and Soviet Union) ===
The SED had a committee called "KPD-Arbeitsbüros" to support the German Communist Party and its Campaign for Democratic Progress list had not the success anticipated only winning 0.6% and the committee was dissolved soon after. The focus of the Communist Party of the Soviet Union was to split the Social Democratic Party of Germany from the CDU/CSU.

=== 1972 election (by Soviet Union) ===
According to documents provided by the State Department Office of the Historian, the US government felt that the KGB supported the Social Democratic Party of Germany-Free Democratic Party social-liberal coalition and "instructed its chief operatives abroad to mobilize all resources in support of their victory". This was done to increase positive relations with East Germany, and more generally to ensure the Soviet bloc would benefit economically from trade with the west.

=== 1980 election (by Soviet Union) ===
According to details provided in the Mitrokhin Archive, the KGB covertly supported the Social Democratic Party of Germany in the 1980 election.

=== 1987 election (by East Germany) ===
The Socialist Unity Party of Germany called the German Communist Party to approach the Social Democratic Party of Germany.

=== 2017 election (by Turkey) ===
In August 2017, Turkish president Recep Tayyip Erdoğan called for all his "countrymen" in Germany to vote against the CDU/CSU, the SPD and the Green Party in the upcoming German federal election. Erdoğan called these parties, as well as German Chancellor Angela Merkel, "enemies of Turkey". There are at least 4 million people of Turkish origin in Germany, most of whom customarily align with the SPD or the Green Party politically. Merkel condemned these statements, and responded that all Germans had to right to vote freely without foreign meddling in the electoral process. German foreign minister Sigmar Gabriel affirmed Erdoğan's segments were an "unprecedented act of interference in the sovereignty of our country." In reaction of the small Alliance of German Democrats using Erdoğan for the campaign, the leader of the Turkish Community in Germany Gökay Sofuoglu stated "A head of state is supposed to defend himself against having his name misused in a foreign election campaign."

=== 2024 election (by Turkey) ===
The Democratic Alliance for Diversity and Awakening was accused of being a branch of Turkey's Justice and Development Party. Christoph de Vries stated that the party allows Turkish president Recep Tayyip Erdoğan to gain political influence in Germany. President of the Innenministerkonferenz Michael Stübgen stated that "such party will act exclusively in the interests of its Turkish mother party, and that does not fit into the German party landscape."

=== 2025 election (by United States) ===
Elon Musk, owner of X and Senior Advisor to the US President, wrote an editorial for Welt am Sonntag in which he endorsed the ethnonationalist right-wing party Alternative for Germany (AfD).

US Vice President JD Vance, while attending the yearly Security Conference in Munich, met with AfD leadership and criticized other German parties for refusing to cooperate with AfD.

Friedrich Merz, head of the Christian Democratic Union and leader of the opposition, criticised Musk for publicly endorsing the AfD calling it "intrusive and domineering" and that he cannot remember a similar scenario in which a Western democracy tried to influence an election of an ally. Social Democratic leader Saskia Esken stated that "anyone who tries to influence our election from abroad […] whether the influence is state-organized from Russia or through the concentrated financial and media power of Elon Musk and his billionaire friends on the Springer board, must expect our strong resistance."

== Greece ==
=== 1958 election (by United States and Soviet Union) ===
During the 1958 election, the CIA "spent large sums of money" on a "wide variety of strategies" in order to covertly support the National Radical Union (ERE).

In an exclusive interview with To Vima, Soviet leader Nikita Khrushchev heavily criticized NATO and claimed that NATO was preventing the resolution of the Cyprus conflict and that the "colonialists" were trying to impose an illegitimate constitution and partition on Cyprus. He also claimed that NATO leaders planned to install nuclear missiles on Greek soil, which would endanger Greek citizens in the event of a nuclear war. This interview was considered by Konstantinos Karamanlis to be overt electoral interference in favour of anti-NATO parties like EDA and the Progressive Agricultural Democratic Union (PADE).

=== 1961 election (by United States) ===
During the 1961 election, the CIA covertly funded the National Radical Union (ERE) and the Centre Union (EK) in order to prevent a victory of the socialist All-Democratic Agricultural Front (EDA). The Greek military, then linked to the CIA, also played a role in ensuring the ERE was victorious by encouraging the public to vote for them.

=== 1974 election (by Soviet Union) ===
According to documents provided by the State Department Office of the Historian, following the legalization of the Communist Party of Greece in 1974, the Soviets covertly gave the party more than $2 million for its election campaign.

== Grenada ==
=== 1984 election (by United States) ===
According to investigative journalist Bob Woodward, the CIA spent $675,000 on education and "getting out the vote" in Grenada after the 1983 invasion. Woodward claims the CIA also used opinion polls to ensure a "strongly pro-US" candidate won the election.

== Guatemala ==
=== 1958 election (by United States) ===
The CIA covertly aided the electoral campaign of José Luis Cruz Salazar (es) of the National Liberation Movement with a payment of $97,000 in order to oust the government of Miguel Ydígoras Fuentes of the National Democratic Reconciliation Party in the 1958 general election.

=== 2023 election (by United States) ===
During Guatemala’s 2023 general elections, several allegations of foreign interference, particularly by the United States, were raised by Guatemalan officials. In December 2023, the U.S. government imposed visa restrictions on approximately 300 Guatemalan citizens, including more than 100 members of Congress. These sanctions were perceived by some as a political pressure tactic and foreign intervention in Guatemala’s internal affairs. Guatemalan President Alejandro Giammattei denounced what he described as "international interference" in the election process during a speech at the United Nations General Assembly. He claimed that these actions aimed to influence electoral results and undermine Guatemala’s sovereignty. Following the U.S. sanctions, Giammattei issued a statement condemning what he called "intimidation tactics" used to pressure Guatemalan officials and manipulate domestic politics.

== Guyana ==
=== 1964 election (by Great Britain and United States) ===
The British government funded the Guiana United Muslim Party to divert Muslim Indo-Guyanese from the People's Progressive Party (PPP). The United States National Security Council $2.08 million for covert action programs after 1962 of which a large portion was given to capitalist The United Force and the socialist People's National Congress. The CIA regarded the PPP leader Cheddi Jagan as a communist.

=== 1968 election (by United States) ===
The CIA supported Forbes Burnham's People's National Congress against the communist People's Progressive Party. In 1970, Burnham himself made a left-turn and improved relationships to the Soviet Union.

== Guinea ==
=== 2010 election (by France) ===
Vincent Bolloré, a French billionaire close to then-French president Nicolas Sarkozy, allegedly gave financial support to presidential candidate Alpha Condé in the 2010 Guinean presidential election. He is suspected of having offered Condé discount on advertisements from his ad agency, which he didn't equally offer to his opponent Cellou Dalein Diallo. Condé went on to become Guinean president and gave Bolloré's company port concessions. Bolloré formally denies any wrongdoing.

== Haiti ==
=== 1918 election (by United States) ===
In 1915, the US occupied Haiti. The original draft for the constitution by the National Assembly was thwarted by American Mayor Smedley Butler and the pro-American president Philippe Sudré Dartiguenave who dissolved the parliament. Open opponents of the new draft by Franklin D. Roosevelt were arrested.

== Honduras ==
=== 2009 election (by Venezuela) ===
In the attempt to hold a referendum to convene a Constituent Assembly, known as the "Fourth Urn," the government of President Manuel Zelaya received funding from then Venezuelan president Hugo Chavez. Chavez reportedly provided 300 million lempiras (approximately US$15 million) for the implementation of the referendum, which sparked controversy and accusations of foreign interference in the internal affairs of Honduras. The referendum was declared illegal by the Supreme Court of Honduras, and the resulting political crisis led to the 2009 Honduran coup d'état, in which Zelaya was removed from office and expelled from the country.

=== 2025 election (by United States) ===
U.S. president Donald J. Trump publicly endorsed Honduran presidential candidate Nasry Asfura of the National Party hours before voting, and suggested U.S. aid and support would be conditional on his victory. Observers raised concerns that this constituted undue foreign influence undermining electoral fairness.

== Hungary ==
=== 1947 election (by Soviet Union) ===
While the election held under Soviet occupation was relatively free and fair but was noted to be partially rigged.

== India ==
=== 1967 election (by Soviet Union) ===
According to details provided in the Mitrokhin Archive, the KGB covertly supported the Communist Party of India in the 1967 election.

=== 1977 election (by Soviet Union) ===
According to details provided in the Mitrokhin Archive, the KGB covertly supported the Indian National Congress in the 1977 election.

== Indonesia ==
=== 1955 election (by United States) ===
The CIA covertly gave over $1 million to centrist and progressive Muslim political parties to cut support for Sukarno and the Communist Party of Indonesia during the 1955 legislative election. The operation was a total failure. Later, the USA supported the anti-Sukarno Permesta rebellion in 1958 and the military-led 1965 anti-communist massacres.

== Iran ==
=== 1952 election (by United States) ===
Historian Ervand Abrahamian, in an interview with Democracy Now!, said U.S. State Department documents declassified in 2017 reveal that the U.S. strategy was to undermine Mohammad Mosaddegh through parliament and the Central Intelligence Agency (CIA) spent lots of money to get their 18 favorable candidates elected.

=== 1980 election (by United States) ===
The United States covertly supported the campaign of Ahmad Madani, who later fled to the USA.

== Iraq ==
=== 2021 election (by Iran) ===
Patriarch Louis Raphaël I Sako and other Christian politicians accused the Babylon Movement (which won 4 out of 5 seats) of having a Shia Muslim voter base. The Babylon Movement is known to have a close relationship to pro-Iranian movements like the Popular Mobilization Forces or the Badr Organization. The United States sanctioned their leader Rayan al-Kildani for his connections to the Iranian Quds Force and to "illegal confiscation of Christian land in the Nineveh Plains and its sale". The Fatah Alliance was also supported by Iran. It was expected that the United States and Iran have influence over the government formation.

=== 2025 election (by Iran and United States) ===
Iran accused the US of interfering in the parliamentary election. The US called for the disarmament of Iran-backed militias and designated some of them to be terrorist organisations. Iraqi foreign minister Fuad Hussein claimed that the US put six Iran-backed militias on a "prohibited" list and to be excluded from the next government.

== Israel ==
=== 1996 election (by United States) ===
U.S. president Bill Clinton later acknowledged that, in the wake of the assassination of Prime Minister Yitzhak Rabin, Clinton interfered on behalf of Shimon Peres against Benjamin Netanyahu. Clinton later said that he "tried to do it in a way that didn't overtly involve me".

=== 2020 election (by United States) ===
The 2020 Israel–Palestine peace plan of US president Donald Trump had been linked to the electoral campaign in Israel and the Donald Trump 2020 presidential campaign. Some critics claimed that it was a distraction from the Trial of Benjamin Netanyahu and his own impeachment inquiry.

== Italy ==
=== 1948 election (by United States, Soviet Union and Vatican City) ===
In the 1948 Italian elections, the administration of Harry Truman, allied with the Roman Catholic Church, funneled millions of dollars in funding to and supplied military advisors for the Christian Democracy party and other parties through the War Powers Act of 1941 in an effort to prevent an election victory for the Popular Democratic Front (FDP), a united front comprising the Italian Socialist Party (PSI) and the Italian Communist Party (PCI), both of which had played key roles in the wartime resistance movement. At the advice of Walter Dowling, the U.S. also invited Prime Minister Alcide De Gasperi on an official visit and made a number of related economic concessions.

Conversely, former CIA officers involved with the operation say that the Soviet Union funneled as much as $10 million monthly to the communists and leveraged its influence on Italian companies via contracts to support organized labor. However, many of their efforts were ad hoc in comparison to the CIA's, and the Christian Democrats eventually won in a landslide.

=== 1953 election (by Soviet Union) ===
The Soviet Union covertly provided funding for the Italian Communist Party during the elections.

=== 1958 election (by United States) ===
According to documents provided by the State Department Office of the Historian, the US believed that providing economic support would contribute to a "favorable election atmosphere" for centrist political parties. The US actively monitored the political situation in Italy and was anxious about a victory by the Italian Communist Party.

=== 1972 election (by Soviet Union) ===
According to details provided in the Mitrokhin Archive, the KGB covertly supported the Italian Communist Party in the 1972 elections.

=== 1976 election (by Soviet Union) ===
According to details provided in the Mitrokhin Archive, the KGB covertly supported the Italian Communist Party in the 1976 elections, where they saw their biggest electoral wins in their history.

=== 1983 election (by United States and Saudi Arabia) ===
According to investigative journalist Bob Woodward, the CIA requested Saudi Arabia spend $2 million to assist in a secret operation to prevent a victory of the Italian Communist Party in the 1983 elections.

=== 2022 election (by Russia) ===
In Italy's 2022 general elections, there were concerns regarding foreign interference, particularly from Russia. Reports revealed that a Russian diplomat contacted an advisor of the far-right Lega, led by Matteo Salvini, discussing the potential withdrawal of Lega ministers from the government, which could have contributed to the downfall of Prime Minister Mario Draghi's government. These interactions raised alarms about Russian influence in Italian politics, although there was no conclusive evidence of direct interference in the election process itself.

Furthermore, there were claims that Russia had financed far-right parties in various countries since 2014, fueling debates in Italy about potential Russian funding in the country's political campaigns. However, no specific instances of foreign interference in the 2022 elections were definitively confirmed.

== Jamaica ==
=== 1976 election (by United States) ===
Michael Manley and many other members of the PNP suspected "Chile style" CIA interference in the 1976 elections against his democratic socialist government.

=== 1980 election (by United States and Germany) ===
During the 1980 elections the CIA and Christian Democrats funded opposition groups against Michael Manley and the PNP.

== Japan ==
The Liberal Democratic Party (LDP) of Japan received secret American funds during the 1950s and 1960s. This was justified by U.S. ambassador to Japan Douglas MacArthur II when he said, without evidence, "the Socialists in Japan had their own secret funds from Moscow", adding that funding the LDP helped to "project American power".

=== 1952 election (by United States) ===
According to documents provided by the State Department Office of the Historian and evidence collected by journalist Tim Weiner, the US interfered in Japan's first elections following the end of the US-led Allied occupation of Japan, starting with publicly withholding details of the new US-Japanese security treaty from the public in order to stave off criticism of the government. The US also quietly funded the Liberal Party in exchange for the party acting in US interests such as fighting off anti-base protests and supporting a military alliance with the USA.

=== 1955 election (by United States) ===
According to evidence collected by journalist Tim Weiner, the US began to provide covert funding to the new Liberal Democratic Party during Japanese elections.

=== 1958 election (by United States) ===
The CIA undertook a number of actions to ensure a victory for the Liberal Democratic Party. This included diplomatic measures such as persuading the South Korean government to grant Japan more liberal fishing rights. Encouraging Vietnam and Indonesia to reach reparations agreements, delivering speeches promoting markets for Japanese exports, speeding the release of war criminals, covertly offering campaign funds, decreasing military spending and promising to relax military presence on the island (a sensitive issue in Japan) and quietly recruited allies in the party through bribes. The CIA also offered payments to Japan Socialist Party members in order to weaken potential anti-American movements.

=== 1960 election (by United States) ===
According to documents provided by the State Department Office of the Historian and evidence collected by journalist Tim Weiner. The US continued to provide covert funding and electoral advice to the Liberal Democratic Party, often disguising advisors as US-based businessman. By the early 1960s, annual payments of between $2 and $10 million to the party and individual politicians had become "so established and so routine," reported Assistant Secretary of State for Intelligence Roger Hillsman, that they were a normal part of bilateral relations.

=== 1963 election (by United States) ===
According to documents provided by the State Department Office of the Historian and evidence collected by journalist Tim Weiner. The US continued to provide covert funding and electoral advice to the Liberal Democratic Party, often disguising advisors as US-based businessman.

=== 1967 election (by United States) ===
According evidence collected by journalist Tim Weiner. The US continued to provide covert funding to the Liberal Democratic Party during Japanese elections.

=== 1969 election (by United States) ===
According evidence collected by journalist Tim Weiner. The US continued to provide covert funding to the Liberal Democratic Party during Japanese elections. According to Weiner, the funding was terminated in the 1970s and he does not state if the US funded the LDP during the 1972 elections.

=== 1972 election (by Soviet Union) ===
The Soviet Union covertly supported the Japan Socialist Party during the 1972 elections by pressuring Japanese companies that did trade with the USSR to financially support the Japan Socialist Party. In exchange for $10 million in contracts with the USSR, these companies provided $100,000 to the Japan Socialist Party.

== Kiribati ==
=== 2020 election (by China) ===
In 2019, Kiribati had ended their diplomatic relations with Taiwan. Banuera Berina alleged that President Taneti Maamau had promised Tobwaan Kiribati Party members that China would fund their re-election bid. Maamau denied any Chinese funding.

=== 2024 election (by China) ===
Some candidates appeared to have unusual high budgets for their campaign leading to rumors and accusations of Chinese involvement.

== Korea ==
=== 1948 election (by United Nations and the Soviet Union) ===
The 1948 Korean elections were overseen primarily by the United Nations Temporary Commission on Korea, or UNTCOK. The United States planned to hold separate elections in the south of the peninsula, a plan which was opposed by Australia, Canada and Syria as members of the commission. According to Gordenker, the commission acted:

in such a way as to affect the controlling political decisions regarding elections in Korea. Moreover, UNTCOK deliberately and directly took a hand in the conduct of the 1948 election.

Conversely the Soviet Union forbade such elections in the north of the peninsula all together. Faced with this, UNTCOK eventually recommended the election take place only in the south, but that the results would be binding on all of Korea.

== Kosovo ==
=== 2021 election (by Serbia) ===
Albert Kinolli, leader of the United Roma Party of Kosovo, claimed that the rival Romani Initiative was supported by the Serb List (SL) and the Serbian president Aleksandar Vučić. SL's allies RI, Unique Gorani Party and United Community (UZ-AH, Bosniak) gained votes in Serbian-majority areas leading to accusation by the losing Bosniak parties that these were orchestrated by the SL. The Election Complaints and Appeals Panel (ECAP) later annulled votes for RI and UZ-AH received in Serbian areas. The SL was backed by the Serbian government, while the Serbian opposition was said to be harassed. The party had numerous appearances in Serbian media while the opposition had no representation, however no other Serbian party was noted to have a notable campaign either way.

=== February 2025 election (by Serbia) ===
The Serb List is said to be directly controlled by Serbia. They received a public endorsement by Serbian president Aleksandar Vučić and during the campaign they presented themselves supportive of the Serbian government.

== Laos ==
=== 1955 election (by United States) ===
According to documents provided by the State Department Office of the Historian, the US government funded the Royal Lao Army, gave money to the government and provided food aid to villages to end supports for communism.

=== 1958 election (by United States) ===
According to documents provided by the State Department Office of the Historian, the US government deeply feared a possible Pathet Lao victory in Laos' elections. In response, they gave money to the royal government in order to carry out projects to boost living standards in rural villages (such as constructing schools, roads, medical facilities, wells and general building repairs). The program cost around $500,000. The US government also directly funded conservative candidates.

=== 1960 election (by United States and Thailand) ===
During the 1960 elections, the US and Thailand covertly funded the Committee for the Defence of National Interests and bribed their opponents to withdraw. The elections were rigged and marked with extensive fraud. This helped contribute to the 1960 Laotian coups.

=== 1967 election (by United States) ===
According to former CIA agent and US diplomat James R. Lilley the CIA worked to ensure "favorable" outcomes in the National Assembly of Laos. He claims "we thought it was important for Vang Pao to have more of a say in the political governing of the country. We figured out whom to support without letting our fingerprints show. As part of our nation building" effort in Laos, we pumped a relatively large amount of money to politicians who would listen to our advice." He also claims that CIA-friendly politicians won 54 out of 57 seats in the National Assembly and that he was called to "Mr. Tammany Hall" by a US ambassador.

== Latvia ==
=== 1940 election (by Soviet Union) ===
The Soviet Union gave an ultimatum to Latvia. The Red Army then occupied the country. Opposition leaders were arrested to prevent competition to the sole communist list. There was no secret vote and the results were rigged. After the election, the communist parliament asked for admission to the USSR.

=== 1998 election (by Russia) ===
During the Latvian elections, the Russian government overtly supported the pro-Russia National Harmony Party.

== Lebanon ==
=== 1957 election (by United States) ===
According to documents provided by the State Department Office of the Historian, in response to growing communist activities in Lebanon and the threat of Syrian-Egyptian influence, the US government gave Lebanon $10 million in economic aid and $2 million in military aid. This was designed to be given to the population (via projects such as low-cost housing, highway construction, irrigation, flood control, rural electrification, water supplies and airport expansion) to boost popular support for the ruling government led by Camille Chamoun before the 1957 Lebanese general election, as well as enhancing the capabilities of the Lebanese military.

This failed to stop instability breaking out the country, culminating with a US military intervention in the 1958 Lebanon crisis.

== Lithuania ==
=== 1940 election (by Soviet Union) ===
The Soviet Union gave an ultimatum to Lithuania. The Red Army occupied the country and president Antanas Smetona fled the country. Opposition leaders were arrested to prevent competition to the sole communist list. There was no secret vote and the results were rigged. After the election, the communist parliament asked for admission to the USSR.

== Malaysia ==
=== 1959 election (by United States) ===
According to documents provided by the State Department Office of the Historian, during the first elections to form the Malaysian parliament, the USA covertly aided the Alliance Party who were running against the Malaysian Islamic Party and the Malayan Peoples' Socialist Front.

== Malta ==
=== 1932 election (by Italy and Catholic Church) ===
The Italian press accused the colonial administration of "new moral and cultural Imperialism" while advocating irredentism and claimed it would endanger the Catholic Church. According to Governor David Campbell, the Catholic Church wanted to ensure a victory of the Nationalist Party. The election was delayed from its original 1930 date due to these events. After the eventual victory of the Nationalist Party, the constitution was suspended in 1933.

=== 1939 election (by Italy) ===
The Nationalist Party had ties to Fascist Italy and received financial support according to the British government’s intelligence after 1936. Enrico Mizzi met Benito Mussolini and the Italian Ministry of Popular Culture became a stake holder of Mizzi's Malta. Mussolini himself bought issues of it.

=== 1971 election (by United States) ===
According to documents provided by the State Department Office of the Historian, during the second elections Malta had following independence from the British Empire, the USA covertly aided the Nationalist Party who were running against the Malta Labour Party.

== Mauritius ==
=== 1982 election (by United States) ===
The CIA covertly gave financial support to Seewoosagur Ramgoolam of the Mauritian Labour Party in the 1982 general election in an attempt to oust Anerood Jugnath and the Mauritian Militant Movement-Mauritian Socialist Party alliance. This was due to fear that the MMM would close Mauritius' ports to the United States Navy and open up Soviet Armed Forces bases, in addition to challenging US claims to Diego Garcia. The US government authorized the Mauritian government to sell off food aid given to the country via USAID for $2 million, enabling them to create 21,000 jobs to help them win the election.

== Mexico ==
=== 1863 election (by France) ===
The Second French Empire held a referendum to convince Maximilian to assume the title Emperor of Mexico. Only clear monarchists were allowed to vote and these votes were seen as representative for the total region. The vote tally also included the whole populace of regions where only the capital was occupied by the French.

== Moldova ==
=== 2024 election and referendum (by Russia) ===
President Maia Sandu attributed the result of the first round and the referendum to foreign interference and described it as an "unprecedented assault on democracy", adding that her government had evidence that 150,000 votes had been bought, with an objective of 300,000. The European Union also said that the two exercises had taken place "under unprecedented interference and intimidation by Russia and its proxies". The United States also noted Russian attempts to "undermine Moldova's election and its European integration". The Kremlin, in response, had denounced the votes in Moldova as "unfree", casting doubt on what it said was a "hard-to-explain" increase in votes in favor of Sandu and the EU referendum, and challenged her to "present evidence" of meddling.

Four hundred Moldovan citizens were investigated for allegedly receiving money to choose the "no" option in the referendum and vote for a determined candidate in the presidential election. Those found guilty would have been fined 37,000 Moldovan lei (over 1,900 euros), but were given the option of not receiving punishment if they cooperated with the authorities.

The head of the Moldovan Police, Viorel Cernăuțeanu, stated on 24 October that since September, a total of $39 million, including 15 million that month and 24 million in October, had been transferred to over 138,000 people in Moldova through the Russian bank Promsvyazbank, which is banned in Moldova. He added that the number of people that had benefited from this system would be much greater as they would have received money not only for themselves but also for members of their family. This money transfer system was believed to have started in late spring, and was carried out through applications that people downloaded with instructions from interactive chatbots on Telegram. This allowed them to enter the system and benefit from transfers from the bank. Cernăuțeanu stated that Moldovan police had documented and stopped the activity of such bots in 97 Telegram groups.

=== 2025 election (by Russia) ===
Allegations of major interference by the Russian Federation in Moldova’s 2025 parliamentary elections. Activities reportedly included large-scale disinformation (via fake-news websites, social-media botnets, AI-generated propaganda), cyber-attacks on electoral and governmental infrastructure, illicit financing and vote-buying for pro-Russian parties, and plans to foment unrest on election day. Domestic and international observers confirmed interference but found no publicly verified evidence of vote-count manipulation.

== Mongolia ==
=== 1996 election (by United States) ===
During the 1996 Mongolian election, that National Endowment for Democracy helped unite several political parties, intellectuals, businessmen, students and other activists into the Democratic Union Coalition and then trained them in grassroots campaigning and membership recruiting. They also assisted in distributing 350,000 copies of a manifesto calling for private property rights, a free press and foreign investment to help convince people to vote out the Mongolian People's Revolutionary Party.

== New Zealand ==
=== 2017 election (by China) ===
The heads of the New Zealand Security Intelligence Service and Government Communications Security Bureau confirmed attempted interference by China in the 2017 New Zealand general election.

== Nepal ==
=== 1959 election (by United States and India) ===
The CIA covertly assisted via "covert operations" for B. P. Koirala and the Nepali Congress in winning the 1959 election. The Communist Party of India also funded the Communist Party of Nepal during the elections.

== Nicaragua ==
=== 1984 election (by United States) ===
The United States covertly funded and bribed anti-Sandinista opposition leaders to boycott the 1984 elections and convince the world Nicaragua ran a "Soviet style" election.

=== 1990 election (by United States) ===
The United States heavily funded and assisted the anti-Sandinista opposition groups in Nicaragua to oust them from power.

=== 2006 election (by United States) ===
U.S. officials have openly opposed Daniel Ortega's and José Rizo's candidacies, and supported Eduardo Montealegre and Sandinista dissident Edmundo Jarquín. U.S. Representative Dan Burton, U.S. Commerce Secretary Carlos Gutierrez and Ambassador Paul Trivelli have all stated that an Ortega victory could scare off foreign investors and threaten Nicaragua's relations with the United States.

The Organization of American States (OAS) mission in Nicaragua told the U.S. government not to meddle in Nicaragua's presidential election in October.

=== 2021 election (by United States) ===
During the Nicaraguan general elections on November 7, 2021, President Daniel Ortega secured a fourth consecutive term in an election widely criticized by the United States, the European Union, and various international organizations as fraudulent. The opposition was effectively dismantled, with several potential candidates arrested before the election.

The Nicaraguan government accused the U.S. of interfering in the electoral process, alleging that Washington funded opposition groups, promoted sanctions, and coordinated a campaign to delegitimize the elections. Ortega’s administration denounced what it called an attempted "foreign intervention" aimed at regime change.

Conversely, independent observers and human rights organizations reported severe restrictions on political freedoms and suppression of dissent, describing the elections as neither free nor fair.

== Pakistan ==
=== 1970 election (by Soviet Union) ===
According to details from the Mitrokhin Archive, the Soviet Union covertly supported the Awami League in Pakistan in order to assist Bangladeshi independence.

== Palestine ==
=== 2006 election (by United States and Israel) ===
During the 2006 Palestinian elections, Israel hoped that Fatah would prevail over Hamas, the latter being a Sunni-Islamic fundamentalist organization. Israeli Prime Minister Ariel Sharon wanted to halt the elections if Hamas ran candidates. However, U.S. president George W. Bush objected to such election interference, and Hamas won, despite millions of clandestine dollars flowing from the Bush administration to Fatah during the closing weeks of the campaign. Then-Senator Hillary Clinton commented at the time: "we should have made sure that we did something to determine who was going to win."

== Panama ==
=== 1984 election (by United States) ===
According to details released during Manuel Noriega's trial, the CIA and drug cartels funded the presidential campaign of Nicolás Ardito Barletta Vallarino.

=== 1989 election (by United States) ===
The CIA covertly launched a campaign to oust General Manuel Noriega, then President of Panama, from office. CIA agents helped set up radio and TV transmitters for opposition groups and sanctions were placed on Panama. It was noted that the event happened after a failed coup with alleged US backing in 1988.

=== 2014 election (by Venezuela) ===
In March 2014, Venezuelan president Nicolás Maduro was accused of interfering in Panama’s electoral process ahead of the May 4 elections. Following the breaking of 2014 diplomatic relations, Maduro praised the late Panamanian leader Omar Torrijos, naming a building in Caracas after him and instructing military units to study his ideology. On March 16, the Panamanian government condemned Maduro’s actions, accusing him of favoring the opposition Democratic Revolutionary Party, founded by Torrijos. On March 18, President Ricardo Martinelli further accused Maduro of directly financing PRD candidate Juan Carlos Navarro’s campaign, calling it an attempt to install a pro-Torrijos government in Panama.

== Paraguay ==
=== 2008 election (by Venezuela) ===
According to a U.S. diplomatic cable revealed by WikiLeaks, Venezuelan president Hugo Chávez allegedly offered to finance the 2008 presidential campaign of Fernando Lugo in Paraguay. The document, dated March 2007, describes a meeting between Venezuelan officials and Paraguayan left-wing leaders, where Chávez reportedly expressed his willingness to provide financial and logistical support to Lugo’s candidacy. The cable indicates that U.S. diplomats were concerned about Venezuelan influence in Paraguay, particularly through financial backing of political movements aligned with Chávez’s regional agenda. However, the report does not confirm whether the alleged funding was ultimately delivered to Lugo’s campaign.

== Peru ==
=== 1962 election (by United States) ===
According to documents provided by the State Department Office of the Historian, Richard N. Goodwin accused the CIA and State Department of funding the American Popular Revolutionary Alliance in the 1962 elections, starting in 1961. He also claimed the CIA supported the labor movement against Juan Velasco Alvarado.

=== 2006 election (by Venezuela) ===
Venezuelan president Hugo Chávez endorsed Ollanta Humala. Peru recalled their ambassador from Caracas soon after for "interference in the internal affairs of Peru". The Venezuelan government denied then denied it stating they would respect the sovereignty of other nations.

=== 2011 election (by Brazil) ===
During the campaign, Ollanta Humala praised the Brazilian government and distanced himself from Hugo Chávez. The ruling Workers' Party supported Humala and Humala hired advisers with close ties to the Brazilian PT and former president Luiz Inácio Lula da Silva which Humala's Peruvian Nationalist Party originally denied.

=== 2021 election (by Bolivia) ===
During Peru’s 2021 general elections, concerns were raised regarding potential political interference from Bolivia. Former Bolivian president Evo Morales publicly supported Pedro Castillo, which was perceived by some Peruvian political sectors as foreign meddling. Morales frequently visited Peru and engaged with political groups aligned with Castillo. As a result, Peru’s Congressional Foreign Relations Committee declared Morales "persona non grata" in November 2021, citing "negative political activism" and "alleged political interference." However, no direct evidence of official Bolivian state involvement in the election was presented. Regarding the government of Bolivian president Luis Arce, no oficial actions or policies were documented that could be classified as direct interference in Peru’s elections. Diplomatic relations between both countries remained stable, and no proven state-backed efforts to influence the electoral process were identified.

=== 2026 election (by United States) ===
During the 2026 Peruvian presidential election, the United States was accused of interfering in the electoral process, particularly through the activities of U.S. Ambassador to Peru Bernie Navarro. Navarro, who had been appointed by Donald Trump, became involved in the electoral process during the second round between Keiko Fujimori and Roberto Sánchez. He attended the presidential debate in Lima, where he was seated in the front row, and met with officials of the National Jury of Elections (JNE) days before the vote. Navarro described his participation as that of an international observer and stated that the United States respected Peru's self-determination and electoral system. After losing the election, Sánchez accused Navarro of having improperly intervened in the election and claimed that the U.S. ambassador had “interfered” in Peru's internal political affairs. Sánchez alleged that international companies had participated in campaigning in favor of Fujimori and claimed that the Peruvian electoral system had received U.S. assistance, although he did not provide evidence demonstrating that the United States had directly manipulated votes or electoral infrastructure. The controversy intensified because the U.S. government subsequently expressed strong support for Fujimori following her victory. On June 30, U.S. Secretary of State Marco Rubio congratulated Fujimori on her electoral victory and stated that the Trump administration looked forward to deepening cooperation with her government on security, investment and trade. The U.S. government therefore openly favored closer relations with the incoming Fujimori administration, although the statement was issued after the election and did not constitute evidence of electoral manipulation.

== Philippines ==
=== 1953 election (by United States) ===
The United States Government, including the Central Intelligence Agency, had a strong influence on the 1953 elections, and candidates in the election fiercely competed with each other for U.S. support. CIA agent Edward Lansdale purportedly ran the successful 1953 presidential campaign of Ramon Magsaysay.

=== 2016 election (by China) ===
Former Foreign Affairs Secretary Albert del Rosario alleged that Chinese officials in February 2019 boasted of influencing the 2016 presidential election to favor President Rodrigo Duterte. Duterte said the allegation is false, noting that he did not need the help of any foreign country to secure the votes needed to win the election.

=== 2025 election (by China) ===
During a hearing of the Senate's special panel on maritime and admiralty zones in April 2025, the National Security Council said that there are indicators that the Chinese government is interfering in the upcoming 2025 national elections including discrediting candidates critical of it and supporting candidates who sympathize with China.

The National Intelligence Coordinating Agency (NICA) also claims that Chinese agents are "amplifying divisive political discourse" in the Philippines in coordination with local proxies. NICA alleged that the Chinese embassy in Manila have paid InfinitUs Marketing Solutions in 2023 for a troll farm on Facebook and Twitter to spread disinformation and promote Chinese state interests.

== Poland ==
=== 1946 referendum (by Soviet Union) ===
The official results were far removed from the actual results since the vote had been seriously compromised by the communists and their supporters. The communists, who already de facto controlled much of the government and had the backing of the military (both the Polish Wojsko Ludowe and Soviet Red Army), used the police (Milicja Obywatelska) and the secret services (Urząd Bezpieczeństwa) to threaten, assault and even murder opposition activists, switch real ballots for false ones, stuff ballot boxes with false votes, consider blank ballots as "yes" votes, destroy votes not in favour of all or any of the three questions or simply falsify votes. Voting in the army was done on command and without secrecy. The falsification was overseen, just like the later 1947 Polish legislative election, by Soviet experts like Aron Palkin and Semyon Davydov, both high-ranking officers from the Soviet Ministry for State Security.

=== 1947 election (by Soviet Union) ===
Although the agreements at the Yalta Conference called for "free and unfettered" elections in Poland, the Kremlin and the Polish Workers' Party had no intention of permitting an honest election. Soviet leader Joseph Stalin was well aware that if Poland held a free election, it would result in an anti-Soviet government. Electoral laws introduced before the elections allowed the government – which since its establishment in 1944 by the Polish Committee of National Liberation had been dominated by the Communists – to remove 409,326 people from the electoral rolls. The 1947 election (along with the previous 1946 referendum) was organized and closely monitored by UB (secret police) specialists, who worked closely with their Soviet counterparts like Aron Pałkin and Siemion Dawydow, both high-ranking officers from the Soviet MGB. In some regions, over 40% of the members of the electoral commissions who were supposed to monitor the voting were recruited by the UB. Bolesław Bierut, head of the provisional Polish parliament (State National Council) and acting president of Poland, asked for Soviet assistance in the election.

=== 2023 election (by European Union) ===
Government spokesman Piotr Müller claimed that the European Commission used the Article 7 for political blackmailing Poland and thus influenced the election. The Commission started the sanctions in 2017 because of democratic backsliding in Poland. When the new government proposed their plan for juridical reforms, the Commission ended the sanctions just two months after the formation of the new government. It remained unsure if the reforms can be passed because it needed approval by the previously ruling Law and Justice and president Andrzej Duda to pass them. While the winning Civic Platform claimed it to be a success of the new government, members of the new opposition like former minister Sebastian Kaleta criticized the decision as the juridical system has not been changed.

=== 2025 election (by Russia, Belarus, United States and Hungary) ===
In the lead-up to the presidential elections of May 18, 2025, Poland detected multiple instances of suspected foreign interference. On April 2, 2025, the prime minister Donald Tusk announced that cyberattacks of “eastern origin” had affected his party’s computer systems, a statement widely interpreted as implicating either Russia or Belarus. Two days before the vote, the websites of coalition parties were hacked, prompting the government to warn of Russian interference. The national cybersecurity agency (NASK) also reported that a number of political ads on Facebook had been funded from abroad and had spent more in the final week than any official campaign committee—ads that supported some candidates and attacked others—raising concerns about illicit election influence with foreign funding. At the same time, Belarusian state-controlled media launched a social media disinformation campaign targeting Polish voters through platforms such as TikTok, X, YouTube, and Facebook. In addition to these technical and informational interventions, external political influence was also evident: US president Donald J. Trump and Hungarian prime minister Viktor Orban publicly endorsed candidate Karol Nawrocki before the election, indicating ideological and international support that many observers interpret as part of a broader sphere of influence.

== Portugal ==
=== 1975 election (by West Germany) ===
Bonn gave economic support, political recognition and diplomatic initiatives to ensure the victory of the democratic Socialist Party over far-left forces like the Portuguese Communist Party. The Friedrich Ebert Foundation of the ruling Social Democratic Party of Germany gave direct financial support and trained the political cadre of the party.

== Romania ==
=== 2024 election (by Russia) ===
The 2024 Romanian presidential election was marred by allegations of Russian interference, raising concerns over election integrity and the potential geopolitical consequences for NATO and the European Union (EU). Multiple reports from Romanian and international authorities detailed foreign influence efforts, particularly aimed at supporting far-right, pro-Russian candidate Călin Georgescu through the illicit foreign funding of a TikTok campaign. Independent Romanian investigative journalism website snoop.ro reported on 20 December 2024, that according to confidential sources from Romania's National Agency for Fiscal Administration (ANAF), it was Romania's own National Liberal Party that financed at least one social media campaign on TikTok. This reporting was re-published by other media outlets but has not been independently confirmed, nor reported by official government sources.

== Russia ==
=== 1996 election (by United States) ===
The first Russian president Boris Yeltsin won his second term in the 1996 presidential elections

A team of private US citizens, campaign experts organized by Felix Braynin, provided assistance to the Yeltsin campaign. The team consisted of Steven Moore, Joe Shumate, George Gorton and Richard Dresner, who worked in Russia four months and received $250,000, plus payment of all costs and unlimited budget to conduct surveys and other activities.

Simultaneously the US administration ensured a US$10.2 billion International Monetary Fund loan to Russia to keep the national economy and pro-Western liberal government afloat. The loan funds were fraudulently misused by Yeltsin's inner circle, and the IMF knowingly turned a blind eye to these facts. Although the aggressive pro-Yeltsin campaign boosted his approval rate from an initial 6% to the 35% that he got during the first round of elections, and later made him win the second round against the Communist competitor, Gennady Zyuganov, with 54% to 41%, there were wide speculations that the official results were rigged.

=== 2024 election (by Ukraine) ===
Attacks on Russian electoral institutions in occupied Ukrainian areas have occurred during the 2024 elections. On 27 February, two bombs targeted United Russia party offices and a polling station in Nova Kakhovka, Kherson Oblast. On 6 March, a car bomb killed a Russian Central Election Commission official in Berdiansk, Zaporizhzhia Oblast. Ukrainian officials linked the attack to local resistance. On 15 March, an IED injured five Russian soldiers at a polling station in Skadovsk, Kherson Oblast. On 16 March, a Ukrainian drone strike targeted a polling station in Zaporizhzhia and a Russian governor claimed another drone strike killed one person in Kakhovka.

On 12 March, the Sibir Battalion, an armed Russian opposition group, condemned the elections in Kursk and Belgorod Oblasts, calling the process a "fiction". The Freedom of Russia Legion also claimed involvement in the attacks. Putin condemned the incursion as an attempt to disrupt the election. Throughout the election, Belgorod was shelled by Ukraine, killing two people in an apparent effort to disrupt voting. Despite this, a 78% turnout in Belgorod Oblast indicated increased support for Putin.

On 25 March, Mediazona reported the Federal Security Service arrested three suspects in connection with an arson plot against a Putin campaign office in Barnaul, Altai Krai.

== Saarland ==
=== 1935 referendum (by Nazi Germany) ===
The German Front was financed by German government and its mass organisations. Unficiation received 91% of the vote and the politics of Nazi Germany likely even decreased support for reunification.

=== 1947 election (by France) ===
The French administration only allowed four parties to participate: the Christian Democratic Party of Saarland, Social Democratic Party of Saarland, Democratic Party Saar (DPS) and the Communist Party Saar with the former two advancing separatism and closer ties to France.

=== 1952 election (by France) ===
The German nationalist DPS was banned in 1951 and instead a new liberal party called "Democratic People's Party" was registered just before the election. The Communist Party remained legal but was sanctioned by the French administration. The pro-German Christian Democratic Union and German Social Democratic Party were not allowed to participate.

== San Marino ==
=== 1959 election (by United States and Italy) ===
According to documents provided by the State Department Office of the Historian, the US and Italy each provided San Marino's government with $850,000 in anticipation of the 1959 elections. This was done to prevent an electoral win of the previously successful Sammarinese Communist Party.

== Serbia ==
=== 2012 election (by United States) ===
In April 2012, Rudy Giuliani lobbied for Aleksandar Vučić in his candidacy for mayor of Belgrade. The US Embassy to Serbia released a statement saying that Giuliani's appearance did not represent the United States endorsing any candidate in Serbia's parliamentary upcoming election. Dragan Đilas, the incumbent mayor, responded to Giuliani's appearance, saying "Giuliani should not speak about Belgrade's future as a man who supported the bombing of Serbia."

On 3 July 2012, the United States' deputy assistant secretary of state, Philip Reeker, conducted undisclosed discussions with Mlađan Dinkić of the URS party in his first day there. When a journalist from B92 asked him what his mission in Serbia was, he replied that he was visiting "because Belgrade is a beautiful city". Subsequently, URS joined the ruling coalition in the Serbian parliament. At the time, Blic published a series of stories from anonymous diplomatic sources, correctly predicting a coalition with URS and SNS, asserting that Reeker's meetings in Belgrade were intended to ensure that the new ruling coalition involve parties which guarantee the continuation of the Belgrade–Pristina negotiations. Additionally, Blic reported that Vučić was against SPS members leading both the BIA and the Ministry of Internal Affairs, and asserted that the United States was in agreement with Vučić in disapproval of SPS controlling both state agencies.

== Singapore ==
=== 2025 general election ===
Prior to the election, the Government of Singapore passed two laws mitigating foreign interference; they were the Foreign Interference (Countermeasures) Act 2021 (FICA), passed in October 2021, and the Foreign Interference (Countermeasures) Regulations 2023, passed in December 2023. At the same time, the Elections Department (ELD) enacted rules to discourage such actions, which it considered "negative campaigning".

During the election, foreign interference became a flashpoint in the election. On 25 April 2025, the Infocomm Media Development Authority (IMDA) ordered Meta to restrict Singaporeans' access to social media posts by three foreign nationals. The foreign nationals were Iskandar Abdul Samad, national treasurer of the Malaysian Islamic Party (PAS), (Note: Malay: Parti Islam Se-Malaysia) who had expressed support for Faisal Manap, an incumbent Member of Parliament (MP) for the opposition Workers' Party (WP), Mohamed Sukri Omar, the party's youth chief in Selangor, who criticised Singaporean Malay–Muslim MPs and accused them of failing to represent Muslim interests, and Zulfikar bin Mohamad Shariff, an Australian citizen who renounced his Singapore citizenship in 2020, having been previously detained under the Internal Security Act (ISA). Several parties, including the WP and the governing People's Action Party (PAP), talked about the risks of voting along religious lines, saying that religion needed to be separate from politics.

== South Africa ==
=== 2024 election (by Russia and China) ===
Foreign-sponsored disinformation campaigns, primarily by entities linked to Russia and China, targeted the 2024 South African general election. These campaigns employed coordinated social-media operations, misinformation and propaganda, and attempted use of generative-AI content to influence public opinion, sow distrust and polarize communities.

== Slovakia ==
Hungary funded organisations through the Party of the Hungarian Community (SMK) with thousands of euros per year ending up to media close to SMK. Rival Most–Híd did not receive any funds.

=== 2024 election (by Hungary) ===
Media close to the Hungarian government and the candidate of the Hungarian minority Krisztián Forró backed Peter Pellegrini and Victor Orban endorsed him calling him an "old friend". His victory was later attributed to the Hungarian vote.

== Somalia ==
=== 1964 election (by United States) ===
According to documents provided by the State Department Office of the Historian, the US began covert actions to influence the 1964 Somali parliamentary elections in order to ensure the election of government and parliamentary officials in Somalia favorably disposed to the West and allocated $200,000 for this purpose. The program was terminated in 1967.

== Spain ==
=== 1979 election (by West Germany) ===
The Friedrich Ebert Foundation of the ruling Social Democratic Party of Germany trained and gave financial support for the Spanish Socialist Workers' Party to help in establishing party structures.

=== 2023 election (by Russia) ===
In the Spanish general election of July 23, 2023, there were allegations of foreign interference, particularly attributed to Russian actors. The European External Action Service published a report in January 2024 documenting cases of external interference and manipulation during the election.

=== 2026 election (by Argentina, United States, Morocco and Russia) ===
Ahead of the 2026 Spanish general election, scheduled for 29 November, the Spanish government expressed concern about possible foreign electoral intervention involving foreign governments and non-state actors. On 21 October, Foreign Minister José Manuel Albares warned that external actors were seeking to divide Spanish and European society, although he declined to identify specific governments responsible for electoral interference. On 21 October, Argentine president Javier Milei publicly urged Spanish voters to remove the ruling Spanish Socialist Workers' Party (PSOE) from power during a visit to Madrid, describing Prime Minister Pedro Sánchez as a dictator. The Spanish Ministry of Foreign Affairs condemned his remarks as external interference in the country's democratic institutions.

The U.S. president Donald Trump also criticised Sánchez's government over its response to the migration crisis in Ceuta during the Spanish election campaign. Albares rejected Trump's statements and warned against external involvement in Spain's electoral debate, although he did not explicitly attribute an electoral interference operation to the United States. In October, Spanish media reported that Moroccan-language social media accounts and commentators had encouraged Spanish citizens of Moroccan origin to vote for the PSOE. A Facebook page known as News Morocco Spain published an Arabic-language appeal supporting Sánchez's party. Some commentators alleged a coordinated Moroccan influence campaign, but the available reporting did not establish direction by the Government of Morocco. Russian-linked information networks were also identified spreading misleading narratives about the July 2026 Ceuta migration crisis. The fact-checking organisation Maldita.es documented the dissemination of material by the pro-Russian Pravda network after the events, but found no evidence that foreign information manipulation had caused the mass border crossings or established a direct link to the November election.

== Sri Lanka ==
=== 2015 election (by India) ===
It was alleged that the Indian Research and Analysis Wing had played a role in uniting the Sri Lankan opposition, to bring about the defeat of Mahinda Rajapaksa. There had been growing concern in the Indian government, on the increasing influence of economic and military rival China in Sri Lankan affairs. Rajapaksa further upped the ante by allowing 2 Chinese People's Liberation Army Navy submarines to dock in 2014, without informing India, in spite of a stand still agreement to this effect between India and Sri Lanka. The growing Chinese tilt of Rajapaksa was viewed by India with unease. Further, it was alleged, that a RAW agent, helped coordination of talks within the opposition, and convincing former PM Ranil Wickremasinghe not to stand against Rajapaksa, but to choose a common opposition candidate, who had better chances of winning. The agent is also alleged to have been in touch with Chandrika Kumaratunga, who played a key role in convincing Maithripala Sirisena to be the common candidate.

== Taiwan ==
=== 1996 election (by China) ===
In the run-up to the 1996 Taiwanese presidential election, the People's Liberation Army launched ballistic missiles within Taiwan's territorial waters off the ports of Keelung and Kaohsiung. This action was intended to intimidate the Taiwanese electorate from voting for presidential candidates that Beijing branded "absolutely identical in attempting to divide the motherland."

=== 2000 election (by China) ===
In the run-up to the 2000 Taiwanese presidential election, Zhu Rongji, the premier of the People's Republic of China at the time, warned that voters should "not just act on impulse at this juncture, which will decide the future course that China and Taiwan will follow" and should "shun a pro-independence candidate", further stating that "[n]o matter who comes into power in Taiwan, Taiwan will never be allowed to be independent. This is our bottom line and the will of 1.25 billion Chinese people." According to Christopher R. Hughes, emeritus professor of International Relations at the London School of Economics, the Chinese government later concluded that the statement helped to produce a counterproductive effect.

=== 2012 election (by China) ===
Prior to the 2012 Taiwanese legislative and presidential elections, an organization controlled by the Taiwan Affairs Office, the Association of Taiwan Investment Enterprises on the Mainland (ATIEM), organized discounted flights to Taiwan for Taishang to vote in Taiwanese elections. In November 2011, the Alliance for the Reunification of China, an organization affiliated with the mainland's China Council for the Promotion of Peaceful National Reunification, held seminars across Taiwan calling for people to vote for Ma Ying-jeou.

=== 2018 election (by China) ===
Taiwan's leaders, including President Tsai Ing-wen and Premier William Lai, have repeatedly accused the People's Republic of China of spreading fake news via social media to influence voters and support candidates more sympathetic to Beijing ahead of the 2018 Taiwanese local elections. Chinese defector Wang Liqiang claimed he had been instructed to interfere in Taiwan's 2018 midterm elections as well as the upcoming race. Taiwan's Ministry of Justice launched investigations into 33 cases of Chinese funding of election candidates. "The story was not as shocking in Taiwan as it was in other parts of the world,” said Lev Nachman, a PhD candidate at the University of California, Irvine, studying social movements and focusing on Taiwan. “It is not news to Taiwanese people that China has been co-opting local organisations for political influence."

=== 2020 election (by China) ===
In the run-up to the 2020 Taiwanese general election, organizations with links to mainland China launched libel lawsuits against journalists investigating their ties and coordination with Chinese government institutions such as the Taiwan Affairs Office.

=== 2022 election (by China) ===
In the run-up to the 2022 Taiwanese local elections, Taiwanese law enforcement carried out raids under the Anti-Infiltration Act on individuals suspected of buying votes on behalf of China. In October 2022, the Chinese government's Taiwan Affairs Office warned that the 2022 Taiwanese constitutional referendum was part of a push toward Taiwanese independence. In August 2023, three individuals connected to united front organizations in Taiwan who attempted to influence the 2022 local elections were indicted for violations of the Anti-Infiltration Act.

=== 2024 election (by China) ===
In the run-up to the 2024 Taiwanese presidential and legislative elections, Taiwan's Mainland Affairs Council accused China of election interference by launching a trade probe. In October 2023, the head of the National Security Bureau stated that the bureau pays "special attention to the Chinese Communists cooperating with opinion poll and public relations companies for the possibility of manipulating opinion polls and issuing them to interfere in the elections." The following month, the head of the National Security Council stated that short-form video was increasingly used to spread propaganda and disinformation to sway voters. Taiwanese authorities investigated over 2,900 cases of electoral interference.

=== 2026 election (by China) ===
In the run-up to the 2026 Taiwanese local elections, it was reported that a Chinese company based in Qinhuangdao, The Boundless Group, had used AI to launch a coordinated disinformation campaign on Facebook in influence local elections.

=== 2028 election (by China) ===
According to a December 2025 report in Yomiuri Shimbun, China has begun deploying online disinformation campaigns in an effort to prevent Lai Ching-te from being reelected in 2028.

== Thailand ==
=== 1969 election (by United States) ===
According to documents provided by the State Department Office of the Historian, the US government covertly supported Thanom Kittikachorn of the United Thai People's Party, although much of the information remains classified.

== Togo ==
=== 2010 election (by France) ===
Vincent Bolloré, a French billionaire close to then-French president Nicolas Sarkozy, allegedly gave financial support to presidential candidate Faure Gnassingbé in the 2010 Togolese presidential election. He is accused of having offered a Gnassingbé discount on advertisements from his ad agency, which he failed to offer to his opponent, Jean-Pierre Fabre. Gnassingbé went on to become the Togolese president and gave port concessions to Bolloré's company. Bolloré formally denies any wrongdoing.

== Transnistria ==
=== 2011 election (by Russia) ===
Russia launched an investigation against long-time leader Igor Smirnov and the state media started a negative campaign against him. Chief of the Presidential Administration of Russia Sergey Naryshkin openly urged him to not seek another term. The ruling party United Russia endorsed Anatoliy Kaminski of the Obnovlenie which is also regarded to be part of the establishment. In the end, another candidate Yevgeny Shevchuk won.

== Turkey ==
=== 2023 election (by Russia and United States) ===
Kemal Kılıçdaroğlu accused Russia of foreign electoral intervention following an alleged sex tape of Muharrem İnce published a day before he dropped out of the race.

During his bid for president, Joe Biden called the Turkish president Recep Tayyip Erdoğan an "autocrat." Then president Biden later avoided to endorse either candidate. Erdoğan still accused the opposition of working with the American government and announced that he would not receive the American ambassador Jeff Flake anymore after he met Kılıçdaroğlu declaring that the election "will give a message to the west". Interior minister Süleyman Soylu even called it a "political coup attempt by the west".

== Ukraine ==
=== 2004 election (by Russia) ===
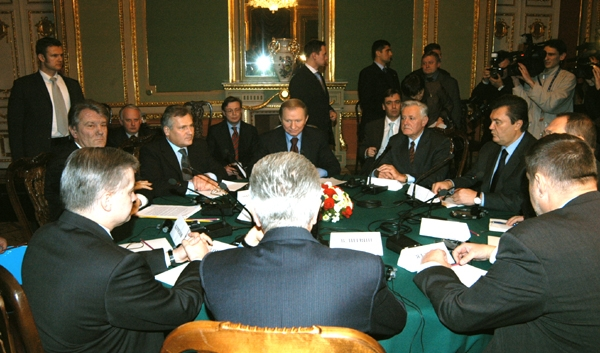
Round table talks with Ukrainian and foreign representatives during the Orange Revolution on 1 December in Kyiv.

The Russian government publicly attempted to influence the 2004 Ukrainian presidential election. Russian president Vladimir Putin gave public support for candidate Viktor Yanukovych and made public visits to Ukraine on his behalf. According to Kempe and Solonenko, "The overall interest of the Russian elite was to keep Ukraine as a reliable neighbor and partner." This was accomplished by channeling Russian funding and expertise directly into the campaign of Yanukovych or the government of Ukraine, in an effort described as "nakedly partisan". Meanwhile, the U.S., Canada, Poland and Slovakia gave money to build political parties in Ukraine.

=== 2014 election (by Russia) ===
Pro-Russian hackers launched a series of cyberattacks over several days to disrupt the May 2014 Ukrainian presidential election, releasing hacked emails, attempting to alter vote tallies, and delaying the final result with distributed denial-of-service attacks. Malware that would have displayed a graphic declaring far-right candidate Dmytro Yarosh the electoral winner was removed from Ukraine's Central Election Commission less than an hour before polls closed. Despite this, Channel One Russia "reported that Mr. Yarosh had won and broadcast the fake graphic, citing the election commission's website, even though it had never appeared there." According to Peter Ordeshook: "These faked results were geared for a specific audience in order to feed the Russian narrative that has claimed from the start that ultra-nationalists and Nazis were behind the revolution in Ukraine."

== United Kingdom ==
=== 2014 Scottish independence referendum (by Russia) ===
A section of the Intelligence and Security Committee Russia report stated that there was 'credible open source commentary' that Russia conducted operations to influence the 2014 Scottish independence referendum in favour of the 'Yes' side.

Ben Nimmo, a security expert for the Atlantic Council, alleged that Russian web brigades attempted to discredit the result by spreading false claims that the referendum was rigged to secure a 'No' victory. The Russian contingent of the international observers invited to oversee the referendum would also claim that the conduct of the count did not meet international standards.

=== 2016 Brexit referendum (by Russia, United States and Saudi Arabia) ===
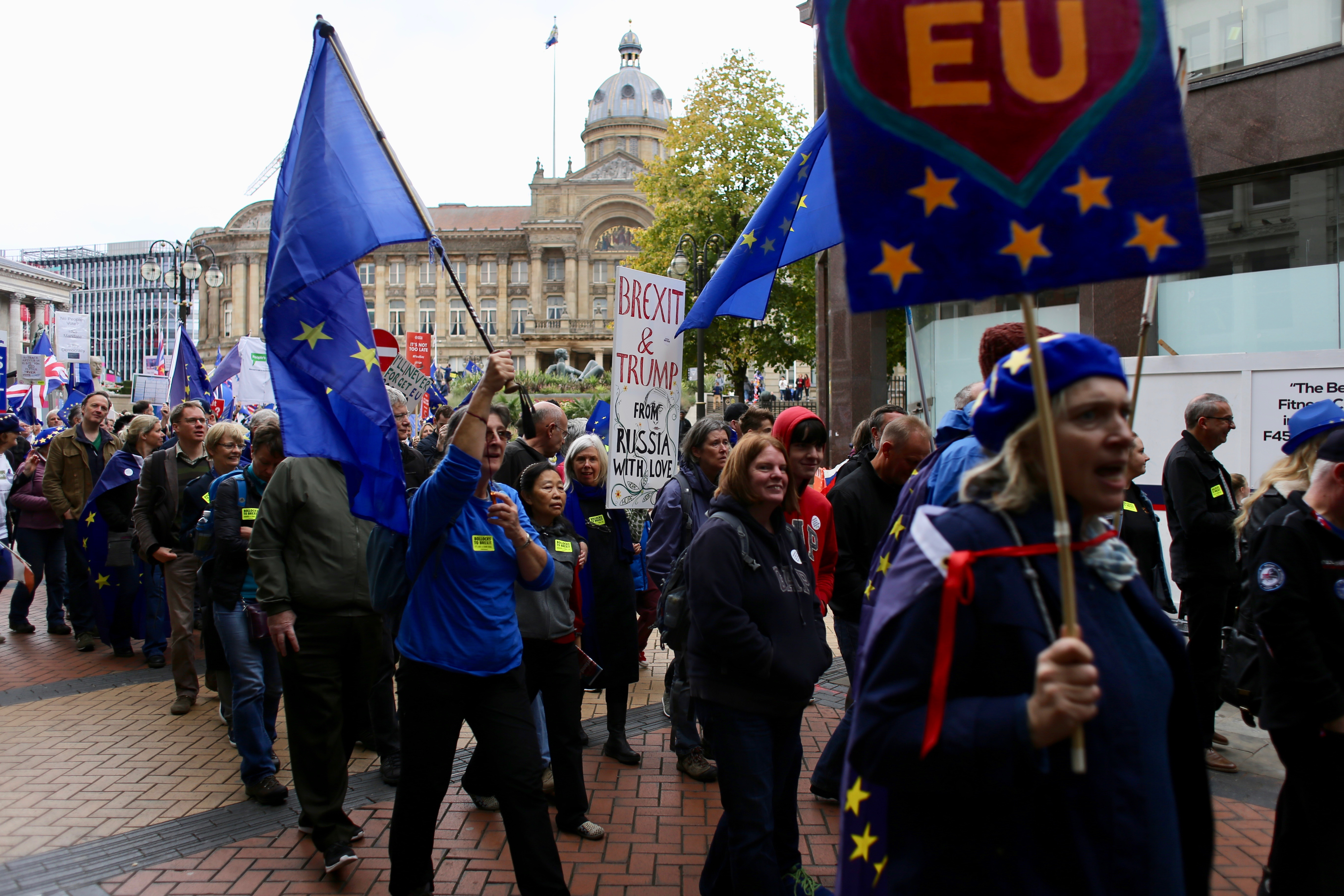
Pro-EU protesters in Birmingham, September 2018

There is ongoing investigation by the UK Electoral Commission, the UK Parliament's Culture Select Committee, and the US Senate, on alleged Russian interference in the United Kingdom European Union membership referendum of 23 June 2016.

In May 2017, it was reported by the Irish Times that £425,622 had potentially been donated by sources in Saudi Arabia to the "vote leave" supporting Democratic Unionist Party for spending during the referendum.

Some British politicians accused U.S. president Barack Obama of interfering in the Brexit vote by publicly stating his support for continued United Kingdom membership of the European Union.

=== 2019 Conservative Party leadership election (by Saudi Arabia) ===
Jeremy Hunt's donors included Ken Costa, investment banker with close ties to Saudi Arabia's Crown Prince Mohammad bin Salman.

=== 2019 election (by India) ===
During the 2019 United Kingdom general election, The Times of India reported that supporters of Narendra Modi's ruling Bharatiya Janata Party (BJP) were actively campaigning for the Tories in 48 marginal seats, and the Today programme reported that it had seen WhatsApp messages sent to Hindus across the country urging them to vote Conservative.

Some British Indians spoke out against what they saw as the BJP's meddling in the UK election.

== United States ==
=== 1796 election (by France) ===
The Jay Treaty between the United States and Great Britain took effect in February 1796, and the French government was very unhappy about it. The French foreign minister, Charles Delacroix, wrote that France "must raise up the [American] people and at the same time conceal the lever by which we do so…. I propose…. to send orders and instructions to our minister plenipotentiary at Philadelphia to use all means in his power to bring about a successful revolution, and [George] Washington's replacement." The French minister (ambassador) to the United States, Pierre Adet, openly supported the Democratic-Republican Party and its presidential nominee Thomas Jefferson, while attacking the Federalist Party and its presidential nominee John Adams.

The foreign intrigue perpetrated by France was unsuccessful, as Adams won the election with an electoral vote count of 71-68. A significant factor that helped to thwart the French efforts was George Washington's Farewell Address, in which the outgoing president condemned foreign meddling.

=== 1940 election (by Nazi Germany and the United Kingdom) ===
In October 1940, seeking to derail the reelection of incumbent U.S. president Franklin D. Roosevelt, Nazi Germany bribed a U.S. newspaper to publish a document that Foreign Minister Joachim von Ribbentrop hoped would convince American voters that Roosevelt was a "warmonger" and "criminal hypocrite". Leaking the captured Polish government document failed to have its intended effect, and Republican Party presidential nominee Wendell Willkie lost the election.

From 1940 until "at least 1944", the British Secret Intelligence Service (SIS) orchestrated what Politico's Steve Usdin described as an influence campaign "without parallel in the history of relations between allied democracies" to undermine U.S. politicians opposed to American participation in World War II—much of which was documented in a declassified history by William Stephenson, the head of the SIS front organization British Security Co-ordination (BSC). Usdin stated that "SIS ... flooded American newspapers with fake stories, leaked the results of illegal electronic surveillance and deployed October surprises against political candidates."

=== 1960 election (by Soviet Union) ===
Adlai Stevenson II had been the Democratic Party presidential nominee in 1952 and 1956, and the Soviets offered him propaganda support if he would run again for president in 1960, but Stevenson declined to run again. Instead, Soviet leader Nikita Khrushchev backed John F. Kennedy in that very close election, against Richard Nixon with whom Krushchev had clashed in the 1959 Kitchen Debate. On 1 July 1960 a Soviet MiG-19 shot down an American RB-47H reconnaissance aircraft in the international airspace over the Barents Sea with four of the crew being killed and two captured by the Soviets: John R. McKone and Freeman B. Olmstead. The Soviets held on to those two prisoners, in order to avoid giving Nixon (who was the incumbent vice president of the United States) an opportunity to boast about his ability to work with the Soviets, and the two United States Air Force officers were released just days after Kennedy's inauguration, on 25 January 1961. Khrushchev later bragged that Kennedy acknowledged the Soviet help: "You're right. I admit you played a role in the election and cast your vote for me...." Former Soviet ambassador to the United States Oleg Troyanovsky confirms Kennedy's acknowledgment, but also quotes Kennedy doubting whether the Soviet support made a difference: "I don't think it affected the elections in any way."

=== 1968 election (by South Vietnam) ===
In the last months of the presidential election between Richard Nixon and Hubert Humphrey, President Lyndon B. Johnson announced an October surprise, intended to aid Humphrey, by declaring a cessation to the bombing in the ongoing Vietnam War and a new round of peace negotiations. In response, Humphrey's popularity grew, eventually leading Nixon by three percentage points.

However, the South Vietnamese government, in consultation with the Nixon campaign, announced three days prior to the election that they would not be participating in the talks, and Nixon went on to win the vote by less than a percentage point.

=== 1980 election (by Iran) ===
Throughout the 1980 presidential election, negotiations were ongoing between the administration of Jimmy Carter and the government of Iran regarding 52 American citizens who had been taken hostage in November 1979. Although it was recognized that negotiations were nearing a successful conclusion, the government of Iran delayed their release until after the election, potentially in retaliation for the decision of Carter to admit the deposed Iranian leader Mohammad Reza Pahlavi to the United States for cancer treatment.

Opinions differ as to the intentional nature of the delay with regard to the outcome of the election. A ten-month investigation by the U.S. House of Representatives concluded that there was "virtually no credible evidence to support the accusations." However, former Iranian president Abolhassan Banisadr claimed there was a deal between Reagan and Iran to delay the release in exchange for arms.

In a declassified memo from 1980, the CIA concluded "Iranian hardliners – especially Ayatollah Khomeini" were "determined to exploit the hostage issue to bring about President Carter’s defeat in the November elections."

=== 1984 election (by Soviet Union) ===
When Ronald Reagan was running for reelection as president, the Soviet Union opposed his candidacy and took active measures against it. Soviet intelligence reportedly attempted to infiltrate both the Republican National Committee and Democratic National Committee.

=== 1996 election (by China) ===
In February 1997, officials from the Federal Bureau of Investigation announced they had uncovered evidence that the Government of China had sought to make illegal foreign contributions to the Democratic National Committee. Despite the evidence, both the presidential administration and the Chinese government denied any wrongdoing.

=== 2012 election (by Israel) ===
In 2012, former Israeli Prime Minister Ehud Olmert claimed that Prime Minister Benjamin Netanyahu tried to undermine President Barack Obama in favor of Republican candidate Mitt Romney. Former prime minister Ehud Barak said that the interference cost Israel aid. Netanyahu has denied that. The accusations included claims that Obama had deliberately snubbed Netanyahu, and another implied that an appearance in a television advertisement was designed by Netanyahu to give support to Romney.

=== 2016 (by multiple countries) ===
Interference in the 2016 election by entities connected to the Russian government was a scandal that dominated the news during the first half of the presidency of Donald Trump.

==== 2016 election (by China) ====
In 2023, the United States Department of Justice indicted Gal Luft for allegedly acting as an unregistered foreign agent on behalf of the Chinese government in an attempt to influence the 2016 United States elections.

==== 2016 election (by Russia) ====
In October 2016, the U.S. government accused Russia of interfering in the 2016 United States elections using a number of strategies including the hacking of the Democratic National Committee (DNC) and leaking its documents to WikiLeaks, which then leaked them to the media. Russia has denied any involvement.

In response, on 29 December 2016, President Barack Obama expelled 35 Russian diplomats and broadened sanctions on Russian entities and individuals.

In January 2017, following a British intelligence tip-off, the U.S. Intelligence Community expressed "high confidence" that Russian president Vladimir Putin ordered an influence campaign designed to interfere in the 2016 U.S. elections, undermine confidence in the U.S. democratic process, harm Secretary Hillary Clinton's chances, and help Donald Trump win.

==== 2016 election (by Ukraine) ====
Although the Ukrainian government denied it took sides, officials of that government attempted to undermine Trump and assist Clinton. Ukrainian antipathy for Trump, and alignment with Clinton, can be traced back to 2013 when Paul Manafort (who managed Trump’s campaign from June to August 2016) did work for Viktor Yanukovych, then the president of Ukraine allied with Russia.

==== 2016 election (by Saudi Arabia and the United Arab Emirates) ====
Special counsel Robert Mueller investigated a meeting between Donald Trump Jr. and an emissary for two Gulf monarchies. In August 2016, Trump Jr. had a meeting with envoy representing Saudi Arabia's Crown Prince and de facto ruler Mohammad bin Salman and Abu Dhabi's Crown Prince Mohammed bin Zayed Al Nahyan, the de facto ruler of the United Arab Emirates. The envoy offered help to the Trump presidential campaign, although it is unclear what form of help they provided to the Trump campaign if any. The meeting included Lebanese-American businessman George Nader, Joel Zamel, an Israeli specialist in social media manipulation, and Blackwater founder Erik Prince. Donald Trump also registered eight new businesses in Saudi Arabia during the election campaign.

==== 2016 election (by Israel) ====
According to The Times of Israel, Trump's longtime confidant Roger Stone "was in contact with one or more apparently well-connected Israelis at the height of the 2016 US presidential campaign, one of whom warned Stone that Trump was “going to be defeated unless we intervene” and promised “we have critical intell[sic].” The exchange between Stone and this Jerusalem-based contact appears in FBI documents made public".

=== 2018 election (by Russia, China and Iran) ===
U.S. Director of National Intelligence Dan Coats accused Russia, China and Iran of trying to influence the 2018 United States elections.

=== 2020 election (by Russia, China, and Iran) ===
U.S. officials have accused Russia and Iran of trying to influence the 2020 United States elections. Donald Trump has separately accused China of influencing the election.

On 13 February 2020, American intelligence officials advised members of the House Intelligence Committee that Russia was interfering in the 2020 election in an effort to get Trump re-elected. China and Iran were found to support the candidacy of Joe Biden though no active election interference by either country was reported. Bloomberg News reported in January 2020 that American intelligence and law enforcement were examining whether Russia was involved in promoting disinformation to undermine Joe Biden as part of a campaign to disrupt the 2020 election. On 21 February 2020, The Washington Post reported that, according to unnamed US officials, Russia was interfering in the 2020 Democratic Party presidential primaries in an effort to support the nomination of Senator Bernie Sanders.

On October 21, 2020, Director of National Intelligence John Ratcliffe said that Iran and Russia had obtained US voter registration data and that Iran had sent intimidating emails to voters under the name "Proud Boys," a far-right group.

In March 2021 a declassified report found that Russia's electoral interference was meant to support Trump, Iran's electoral interference was meant to hurt Trump, and China did not seek to influence the outcome.

=== 2022 election (by multiple countries) ===
==== 2022 election (by China) ====
In March 2022, the U.S. Department of Justice indicted individuals, including a Ministry of State Security officer, for surveilling and conspiring to smear and physically attack Chinese American political candidate Xiong Yan. In September 2022, Meta Platforms removed fake accounts linked to a China-based influence operation ahead of the 2022 United States elections. In October 2022, Mandiant reported that Chinese state-backed advanced persistent threat group Dragonbridge was attempting to dissuade Americans from voting in the 2022 midterm elections via fake social media accounts and falsified news articles. In early November 2022, Twitter disrupted several China-based fake account networks aimed at influencing the U.S. midterms.

In 2023, a declassified report from the Director of National Intelligence stated that "Chinese authorities tacitly approved operations to influence a handful of political races in the United States in 2022."

==== 2022 election (by Cuba) ====
A declassified report by the Office of the Director of National Intelligence stated that Cuban officials worked to build relationships with members of the American media who held sympathetic views of the Cuban government in order to discredit U.S. politicians viewed as hostile to the Cuban state during the 2022 midterm elections.

=== 2024 election (by multiple countries) ===
==== 2024 election (by China) ====
In the run-up to the 2024 United States elections, Microsoft stated that it detected a network of social media accounts, starting in March 2023, run by the Ministry of Public Security using generative artificial intelligence seeking to sway US voters. The Ministry of Public Security's Spamouflage influence operation was identified as having used fake social media accounts to impersonate voters in an attempt to amplify divisions in US society. In April 2024, United States Secretary of State Antony Blinken stated that Washington had seen evidence of attempts by China to interfere in the 2024 United States elections.

==== 2024 election (by Cuba) ====
According to the Office of the Director of National Intelligence, the Cuban government undertook "localized influence operations that are much more narrowly focused on opposing anti-regime candidates in the United States" during the 2024 elections.

==== 2024 election (by Russia and Iran) ====
According to Microsoft and Politico, beginning in July 2024, a group linked to the Islamic Revolutionary Guard Corps targeted the Donald Trump 2024 presidential campaign with an email phishing attack, which triggered an FBI investigation. It has also created fake news sites and impersonated activists in an attempt to stoke division and sway voters in swing states.

=== 2025 election (by Israel) ===
French government agency Viginum accused an Israeli influence operation called BlackCore of interference in the 2025 New York City mayoral election.

=== 2026 election (by multiple countries) ===
==== 2026 election (by Russia) ====
Ahead of the 2026 United States elections, U.S. intelligence and election-security officials warned that Russia continued to conduct influence operations targeting the American political environment. Russian-linked networks were reported to use disinformation, covert social-media activity and artificial intelligence to amplify political divisions, undermine confidence in democratic institutions, and influence voters. U.S. officials identified Russia as one of the principal foreign threats to the 2026 election cycle, alongside China and Iran.

==== 2026 election (by China) ====
Ahead of the 2026 United States elections, China was identified by U.S. officials and election-security researchers as one of the principal foreign threats to the electoral environment. Chinese-linked influence networks were expected to use disinformation, covert social-media operations and artificial intelligence to exploit political divisions and undermine confidence in American democratic institutions. In July 2026, Donald Trump also accused China of interfering in previous U.S. elections and released intelligence documents that he claimed supported the allegations, although U.S. intelligence assessments had previously found no evidence that China changed the outcome of the 2020 election.

==== 2026 election (by Iran) ====
Ahead of the 2026 United States elections, Iran was identified by U.S. intelligence as a potential foreign interference threat. Iranian-linked actors have used cyber operations, inauthentic social-media accounts and disinformation to influence American political discourse, while U.S. intelligence has warned that Tehran seeks to exploit political divisions and undermine confidence in democratic institutions. Declassified intelligence also assessed that Iran had previously targeted U.S. election infrastructure and political campaigns.

==== 2026 election (by Canada) ====
Ahead of the 2026 U.S. midterm elections, scheduled for 3 November, officials in the administration of Donald Trump accused Canadian politicians of attempting to influence American politics. Pete Hoekstra, the United States Ambassador to Canada, warned that U.S. officials were monitoring possible Canadian electoral interference, citing statements by Canadian Industry Minister Mélanie Joly, former Prime Minister Justin Trudeau, and advertising by the government of Ontario opposing American tariffs. Hoekstra suggested that Ontario's 2025 advertising campaign featuring former U.S. President Ronald Reagan could be interpreted as political interference. On 21 October 2026, the U.S. embassy in Canada released a compilation of statements by Canadian politicians that it said indicated plans to influence American politics. The document included remarks by Joly about applying economic pressure to politically sensitive U.S. states in response to American tariffs, as well as statements by Ontario Premier Doug Ford. Joly denied that Canada would interfere in U.S. elections, while Ford said he had no interest in electoral interference. Prime Minister Mark Carney defended Canada's trade policies as measures intended to protect Canadian workers and families. The allegations arose amid the U.S.–Canada trade dispute. The publicly reported allegations did not establish that the Canadian government had conducted a covert electoral interference operation.

==== 2026 election (by Argentina) ====
Ahead of the 2026 United States elections, Argentine president Javier Milei publicly supported Donald Trump and Republican candidates. On 14 October 2026, during a speech in Washington, D.C., Milei expressed his hope that the Trump administration would emerge strengthened from the 3 November midterm elections, describing the outcome as important for the Western world. On 19 October, Milei endorsed the re-election campaign of Republican congresswoman María Elvira Salazar, who represented Florida's 27th congressional district. In a video shared by Salazar, Milei praised her political positions and expressed support for her re-election. On 20 October, Democratic congressman Gregory Meeks, the ranking member of the House Foreign Affairs Committee, condemned the endorsement as an inappropriate intrusion into American democracy, arguing that elections should be decided by American voters rather than foreign heads of state. Salazar rejected the criticism.

== Uruguay ==
=== 1971 election (by United States and Brazil) ===
Operation Thirty Hours was a Brazilian military plan to invade Uruguay in 1971. Brazil was under a military dictatorship, governed by Emílio Garrastazu Médici. During that time Uruguay was in an electoral process and the possibility of victory by the left-wing Frente Amplio (Broad Front) frightened both the Brazilian rulers and the Tupamaros, an Uruguayan urban guerrilla group. However, the Broad Front was defeated at the polls and the plan was cancelled.

In December 1971, US president Richard Nixon boasted to UK prime minister Edward Heath that Brazil, an ally of the USA, had rigged the election to ensure that the "leftists" lost.

== Venezuela ==
=== 1958 election (by Soviet Union) ===
The Soviet Union covertly supported Wolfgang Larrazábal who represented a Democratic Republican Union-Communist Party of Venezuela coalition in the 1958 Venezuelan general election. Wolfgang lost to Rómulo Betancourt of Democratic Action.

== Vietnam ==
=== 1971 election (by United States) ===
According to documents provided by the State Department Office of the Historian, the US government carried out a number of covert actions to ensure that Nguyễn Văn Thiệu would get elected. The CIA covertly funded Thiệu and his political allies, as well as pressuring political parties to act in a compliant way.

== Yugoslavia ==
=== 1997 Montenegrin presidential election (by the United States) ===
Milo Đukanović's victory had enormous international implications, as Robert Gelbard explicitly stated that "the United States government supports the election of president-elect Đukanović." On 12 January 1998, Gelbard visited Montenegro, where he condemned demonstrations against Đukanović's inauguration. Gelbard claimed that Momir Bulatović (who had been backed by the Yugoslav government) promised him in person that he would recognize the election results. On 13 January 1998, Bulatović told supporters in Podgorica that he spoke with Gelbard, stating, "I had the opportunity and privilege to speak with [Gelbard], and I asked him how do they know in America what we don't know in Montenegro? From where did this idea occur to the American administration, which is highly valued and influential, that we're preparing an armed rebellion and violence?" Bulatović denied to the crowd that he had promised Gelbard to recognize the result. He ultimately rejected the election result, and asserted that the United States helped determine the outcome.

"The fact is that over two years ago we recognized that Milo Đukanović had the potential to become an effective counterweight to Milošević and his authoritarian policies. I began meeting with Đukanović regularly even before he became the President of Montenegro a year and a half ago. I was with him during his inauguration when we felt that a strong international presence, a public presence, would deter a Milošević-inspired coup."

— Gelbard testifying in front of the U.S. Senate during the "Prospects for Democracy in Yugoslavia" hearings on 29 July 1999.

Additionally, Bulatović claimed that US secretary of state Madeleine Albright was informed of the election result before the electoral commission made an announcement. He also claimed that the electoral judge had revealed personal details of intimidation.

"The chairman of the electoral commission, the Judge Marko Dakić (who in my mind was a fair person and an excellent lawyer) asked me to see him amongst the audience. He was on the verge of physical and mental breakdown and visibly under huge pressure as a consequence of continuous lack of sleep. He explained in a rather confused manner what was happening...that they were under intolerable pressure to announce the result. He was mentioning threats that had been directed at him and that he had a fear both for his family and himself. All in all it was clear that he had to announce that Milo was the victor."

— Bulatović in Pravila ćutanja (2005).

=== 2000 election (by the United States) ===
In October 1999, the National Democratic Institute hosted a conference at the Marriott Hotel in Budapest, inviting activists from the Serbian opposition. In the conference, Douglas Schoen advised opposition activists to campaign in a united coalition. At the conference, activists were shown an opinion poll commissioned by Penn, Schoen & Berland Associates, depicting Vojislav Koštunica with a greater probability of beating Slobodan Milošević in an election than that of Zoran Đinđić. Koštunica's critical stance on the United States was also significant, as he and his party, Democratic Party of Serbia, categorically rejected US financial support. In spite of this, Koštunica was an inevitable beneficiary of US support, witting or not, as other parties associated with either the DOS coalition or the Otpor! movement received a sum of $41 million in financial support from the United States from 1999 to 2000. USAID provided 5,000 spray cans for anti-Milošević graffiti and the printing of 2.5 million stickers with the message "Gotov je", or "He's finished". The United States also paid for the training of electoral monitors in Szeged, Hungary, and subsequently paid monitors $5 each after the election.

On 15 August 2000, the United States Department of State announced the opening of an office of Yugoslav affairs within the US embassy in Budapest. The Department of State added that the office "will consist of State Department and [USAID] officials and will work to support the full range of democratic forces in Serbia". The office's budget and specific role was not disclosed by diplomats at the time. Koštunica, already under attack by accusations of collaborating with foreign powers, called the office "the kiss of death".

=== 2006 Montenegrin independence referendum (by the United States and Russia) ===
According to an investigation supported by the Puffin Foundation Investigative Fund in 2008, The Nation reported that Milan Roćen authorized a contract with Davis Manafort Inc, a consulting firm founded by Rick Davis, and that the firm was paid several million dollars to help organize the independence campaign. Election finance documents did not record any exchanges with Davis Manafort, although the claims of the payments were backed by multiple American diplomats and Montenegrin government officials on the condition of anonymity.

Almost one decade later, Paul Manafort revealed during his trials that he had been hired by Oleg Deripaska to support the referendum in Montenegro. In a discussion with Radio Free Europe in 2017, Branko Lukovac, a former campaign chief for the independence bloc, claimed that he was not aware of a contract with Manafort, but acknowledged the following:

"We in America had especially strong support and a group of friends on top with former presidential candidate Bob Dole, who contributed in Congress, Senate, State Department, and further circles, we even had access to Colin Powell...to support our movement to independence."

Dole had been paid a sum of $1.38 million by the Montenegrin government for lobbying between 2001 and 2008. Lukovac denied any contract with either Manafort or Deripaska, claiming that Russian president Vladimir Putin told his campaign that "he'd prefer to for us to stay in the state union Serbia and Montenegro rather than separate, but if that is what is democratically defined by the majority of Montenegrin citizens, that they [Russia] would support that."

== See also ==
- Artificial intelligence and elections
- Cambridge Analytica – British company worked in more than 200 elections around the world, including in Nigeria, the Czech Republic and Argentina.
- CIA influence on public opinion
- Fancy Bear, a Russian conduit for cyberwarfare implicated in interference in several elections in Europe and North America.
- Ibiza affair, a scandal where Austrian politicians negotiated with a person pretending to be a relative of a Russian oligarch before the 2017 Austrian legislative election.
- Internet Research Agency – Russian company, funded by Russian businessman Yevgeny Prigozhin, that was implicated in interference in several elections in Europe and North America.
- Jus exclusivae – the right of a monarch to veto cardinals during a conclave.
- Murchison letter regarding inadvertent British influence on the 1888 U.S. presidential election
- Russia involvement in regime change
- Soviet involvement in regime change
- State-sponsored Internet propaganda
- United States involvement in regime change
- United States involvement in regime change in Latin America
