= Secretariat-General for National Defence and Security =

French interministerial organ

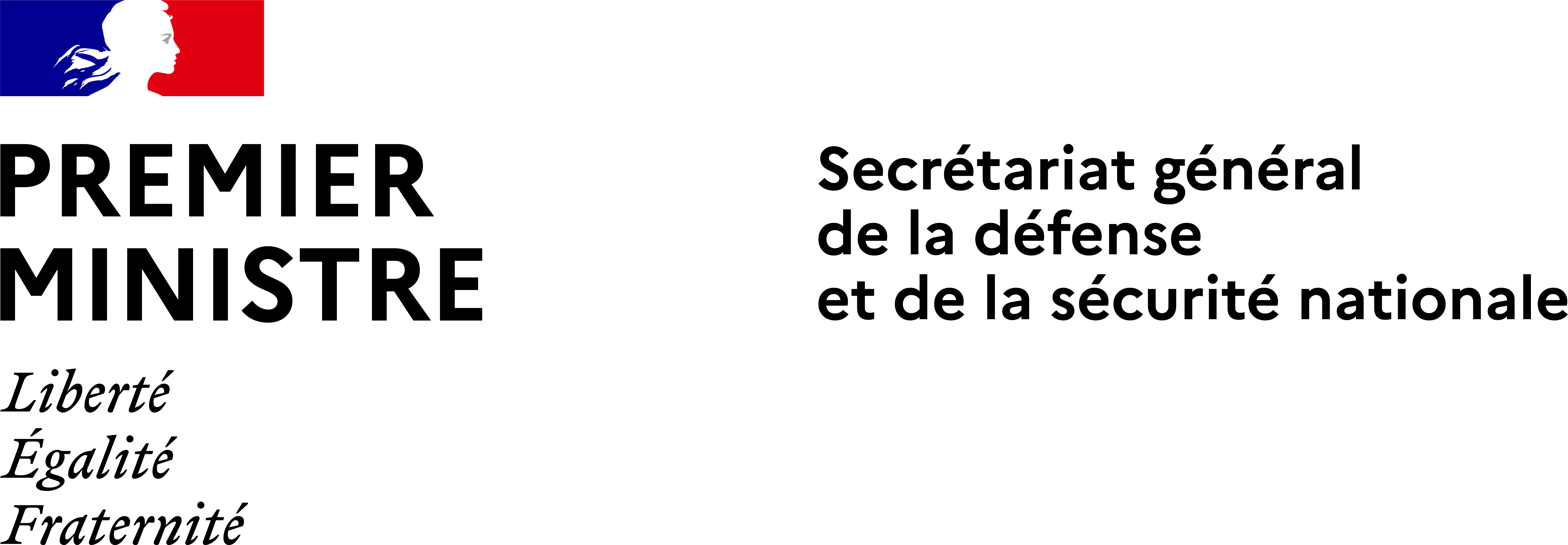
SGDSN logo

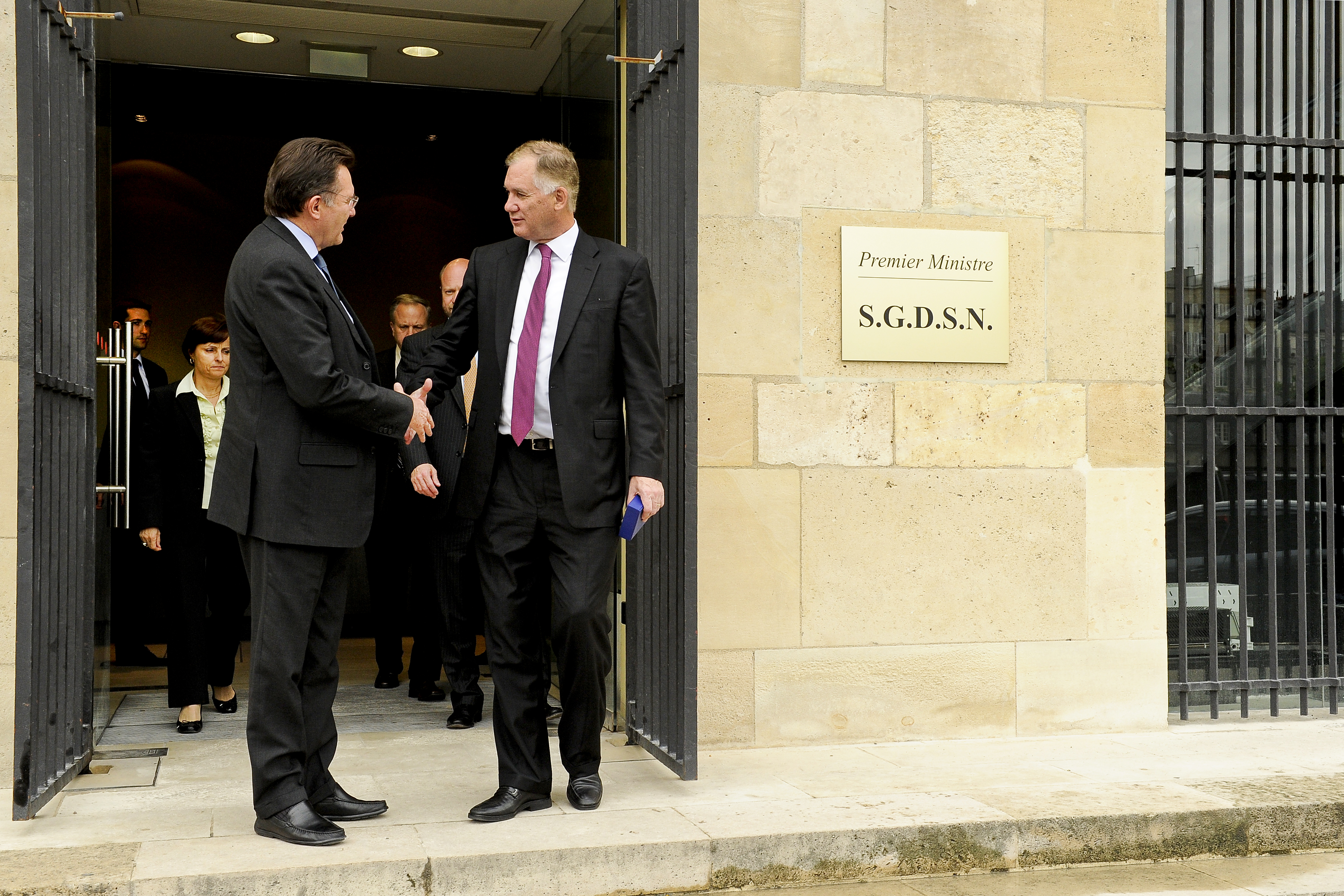
SGDSN Francis Delon with US Deputy Secretary William J. Lynn III at the Hôtel des Invalides in Paris, 2011

The Secretariat-General for National Defence and Security (French: Secrétariat général de la Défense et de la Sécurité nationale, SGDSN) is an interdepartmental organ under the Prime Minister of France. Its head is the secretary of the National Defence and Security Council (Conseil de Défense et de Sécurité nationale, CDSN). It is seated at the Hôtel des Invalides in Paris.

The current Secretary General for National Defence and Security (Secrétaire général de la Défense et de la Sécurité nationale) is diplomat Nicolas Roche, formerly Chief of Staff to the Foreign Minister (2019–2022) and ambassador to Iran (2022–2025), appointed in 2025.

The organ was founded in 1906 as the Conseil supérieur de la Défense nationale ("High Council of National Defence" or CSDN); it was later known as the Comité de Défense nationale ("Committee for National Defence") then became the Secrétariat général de la Défense nationale (SGDN, "General Secretary for National Defence") in 1962. On 13 January 2010, the SGDN received its current name.

France's counter-disinformation watchdog, Viginum, is hosted within the SGDSN.

== Sources ==
- Daho, Grégory (July–September 2019). "La désectorisation des politiques de sécurité. Le cas du recentrage interministériel du Secrétariat général de la Défense et de la Sécurité nationale". Revue française d'administration publique (in French). 171 (171). Strasbourg: École nationale d'administration: 651–667. doi:10.3917/rfap.171.0651. ISSN 0152-7401 – via Cairn.info.
