= BlackCore election interference scandal =

2026 election meddling allegations against Israeli entity

In June 2026, Viginum, the French government watchdog against foreign digital interference, accused an Israeli influence operation called BlackCore of interfering in elections in France. Viginum subsequently accused the operation of election interference in New York City, Scotland, Togo, and Angola.

== Background ==
BlackCore is an Israeli influence and cyber entity based in Tel Aviv. BlackCore described itself as "an elite influence, cyber, and technology company built for the modern era of information warfare," including providing political campaigns and governments with "cutting-edge strategies, advanced tools, and robust security to shape narratives." There was no legal entity found behind the name though investigators linked two active companies to the operation - Galacticos Ltd. and SNI Digital Ltd. Both are companies registered at the same Tel Aviv address, 103 HaHashmonaim Street, and shared web infrastructure. Investigators named Guy Geyor as part of management of SNI; Yigal Unna and Doron Afik as part of Galacticos management. The investigators also linked Nir Dobicky, a resident of Sweden of Israeli origin who ran companies in the UK and Sweden for the operation.

Following inquiries by Reuters, BlackCore scrubbed its online presence with its LinkedIn page and website going blank.

== Election interference allegations ==
In May 2026, French intelligence agencies were examining if BlackCore had interfered in elections in a smear campaign against three far-left politicians in France's 2026 municipal elections.

On 11 June 2026, French Prime Minister Sebastien Lecornu held a press conference with French government agency Viginum's chief Marc-Antoine Brillant, with Brillant saying that technical work had led them to BlackCore. Viginum subsequently produced a report on BlackCore's alleged election interference work, including in New York City, Scotland, Togo, and Angola.

Brillant said, "This modus operandi was not limited to municipal elections in France," adding, "It also appears to have been used to carry out foreign digital interference operations in other countries or regions, such as Angola, Togo, the elections in Scotland, and the 2025 municipal election in New York."

Brillant noted that "Our investigations did not make it possible to identify the sponsor or sponsors, if indeed they exist, behind this foreign digital interference."

=== France ===
In May 2026 Viginum opened an investigation into BlackCore after it had noted a "system of artificial or automated dissemination to spread manifestly inaccurate or misleading content."

On 20 May 2026, Viginum deputy head Anne-Sophie Dhiver told French lawmakers that "a private company based in Israel that specializes in selling online destabilization services" had targeted candidates of the hard-left La France Insoumise (LFI) party, including Sébastien Delogu (Marseille), François Piquemal (Toulouse) and David Guiraud (Roubaix). The objective of the campaign was to " smear pro-Palestine election candidates".

On 13 June 2026, Le Monde published an article alleging that other firms may have also been involved in interfering in French local elections in addition to BlackCore.

==== Reaction ====
François Piquemal, one of the French politicians allegedly targeted, advanced to the runoff in the Toulouse mayoral race but lost in the second round. During parliamentary questions on 20 May 2026, Piquemal condemned the "facts of extreme gravity for our country’s sovereignty", asking if the French government would summon "the Israeli ambassador to ask for an explanation."

Interior Minister Laurent Nuñez replied by noting legal proceedings were underway on an "obviously malicious" campaign of foreign interference in the election.

=== Angola ===
BlackCore developed a training program for the Angolan government.

=== Scotland ===
The report described efforts by BlackCore-linked accounts targeting First Minister of Scotland John Swinney. Viginum said hundreds of fake social media accounts would leave co-ordinated comments on Swinney's posts as well as SNP and Scottish government accounts. Swinney had described the conflict in Gaza as a "man-made humanitarian catastrophe" and said a genocide by Israel may be unfolding. He described the Viginum report as "deeply concerning" and called on the UK government to deal with hostile state online interference with a far higher priority.

The National lodged Freedom of Information requests with the UK and Scottish governments, asking for information about the effect of BlackCore's actions on Scotland and Scottish elections. The UK government refused to release any information about BlackCore in order to "avoid giving offence to other nations and retain the trust of our international partners". The Scottish government withheld some information on national security grounds but released documents indicating that it was unaware of BlackCore's actions prior to the publication of media reports.

=== New York City ===
According to the investigators, BlackCore is suspected of targeting the 2025 mayoral election in New York, which was won by Zohran Mamdani, a Democratic Socialist and a supporter of Palestine.

== Fake Palestinian aid charity ==
Blackcore was also accused of operating a fake Palestinian charity. Viginum presented evidence of BlackCore's links to "Sadaqah Palestine", a purported Palestinian charity, suggest that it was part of efforts to fraudulently target pro-Palestinian audiences.

== See also ==
- List of foreign electoral interventions
- Foreign information manipulation and interference
- State-sponsored Internet propaganda
- Disinformation attack
