= Viginum =

French agency to fight foreign disinformation

- service de vigilance et de protection contre les ingérences numériques étrangères

Agency overview
- Formed: 13 July 2021
- Jurisdiction: France
- Employees: 64
- Agency executives: Marc-Antoine Brillant, Head of Viginum; Anne-Sophie Dhiver, Deputy Head of Viginum
- Parent department: Secretariat-General for National Defence and Security

The Vigilance and Protection against Foreign Digital Interference Service (Viginum; service de vigilance et de protection contre les ingérences numériques étrangères) is a French government agency established as the country's watchdog to combat foreign information manipulation and interference (FIMI) and foreign election interference. The agency is under the Secretariat-General for National Defence and Security within the under the Prime Minister of France.

== History ==
In 2026, Viginum produced a report into election interference by Israeli cyber firm BlackCore.
