= Gorskaya railway station =

Railway station in Saint Petersburg, Russia

Gorskaya Горская
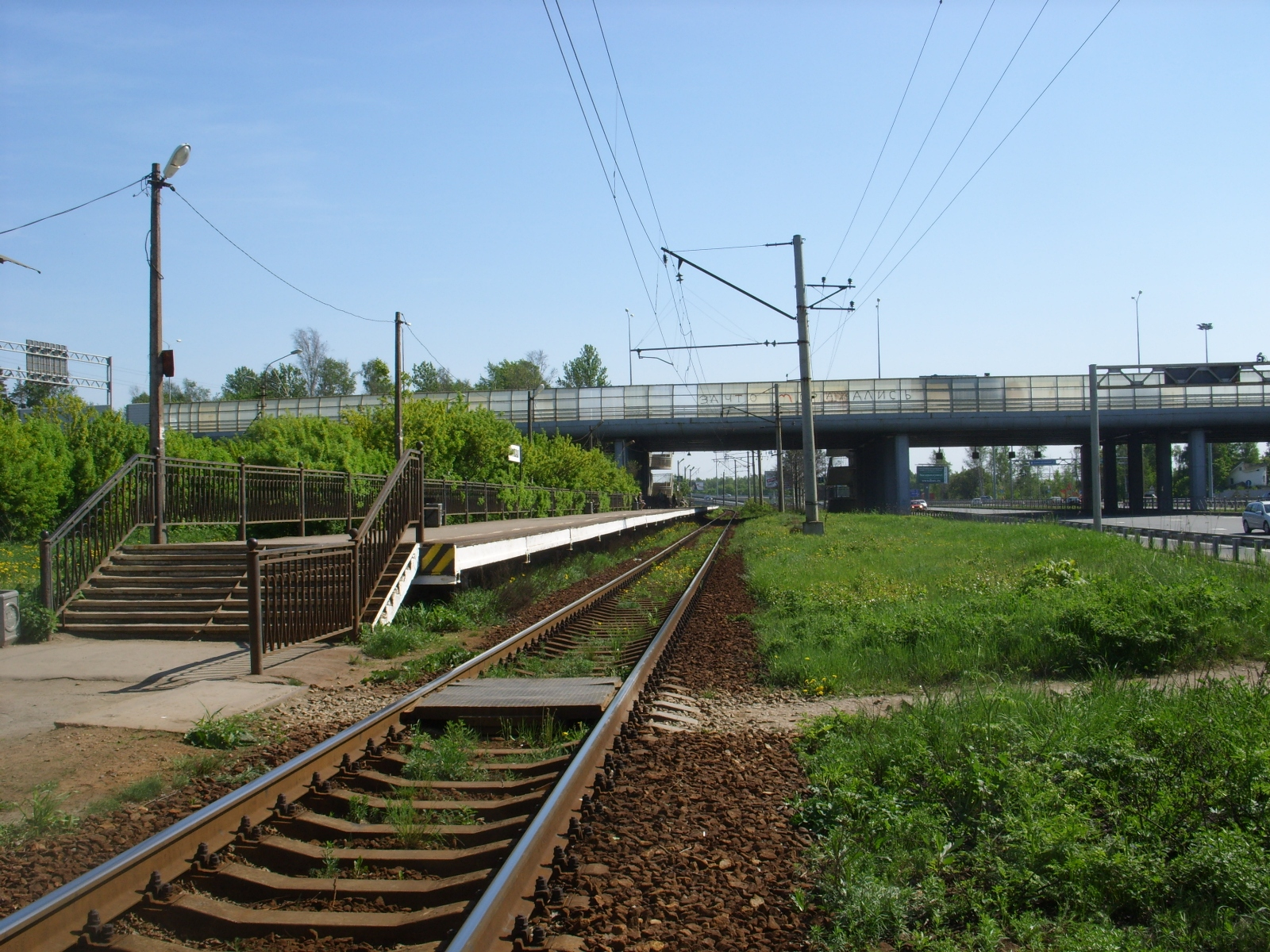

General information
- Location: Sestroretsk, Kurortny District; Saint Petersburg; Russia
- Coordinates: 60°2′21″N 29°58′37″E
- Owner: Russian Railways
- Operator: October Railway
- Line: Saint Petersburg Railway Division
- Platforms: 1
- Tracks: 1

Construction
- Structure type: At-grade

History
- Opened: 26 November 1894 (original)
- Rebuilt: 1952, 2001
- Electrified: 1 June 1952

Services
Preceding station	Russian Railways	Following station
Alexandrovskaya towards Beloostrov	Saint Petersburg–Beloostrov	Lisy Nos towards Saint Petersburg–Finlyandsky
Former services
Preceding station	Primorskaya Railway	Following station
Alexandrovskaya towards Dyuny	Primorskaya Line	Kaupilovo towards Primorsky
Location

Gorskaya (Russian: Го́рская), is a railway station in Saint Petersburg, Russia located between Lisiy Nos in Primorsky District and the Sestroretsk in Kurortny District. The station was opened on November 26, 1894, as part of the Primorskaya Line opening section between Razdelnaya and Sestroretsk.

In 1952, the line was electrified, and at the same time, high platforms were constructed and it was reconstructed again from 1999 to 2001 when the Gorskaya road interchange was built.

== Gallery ==
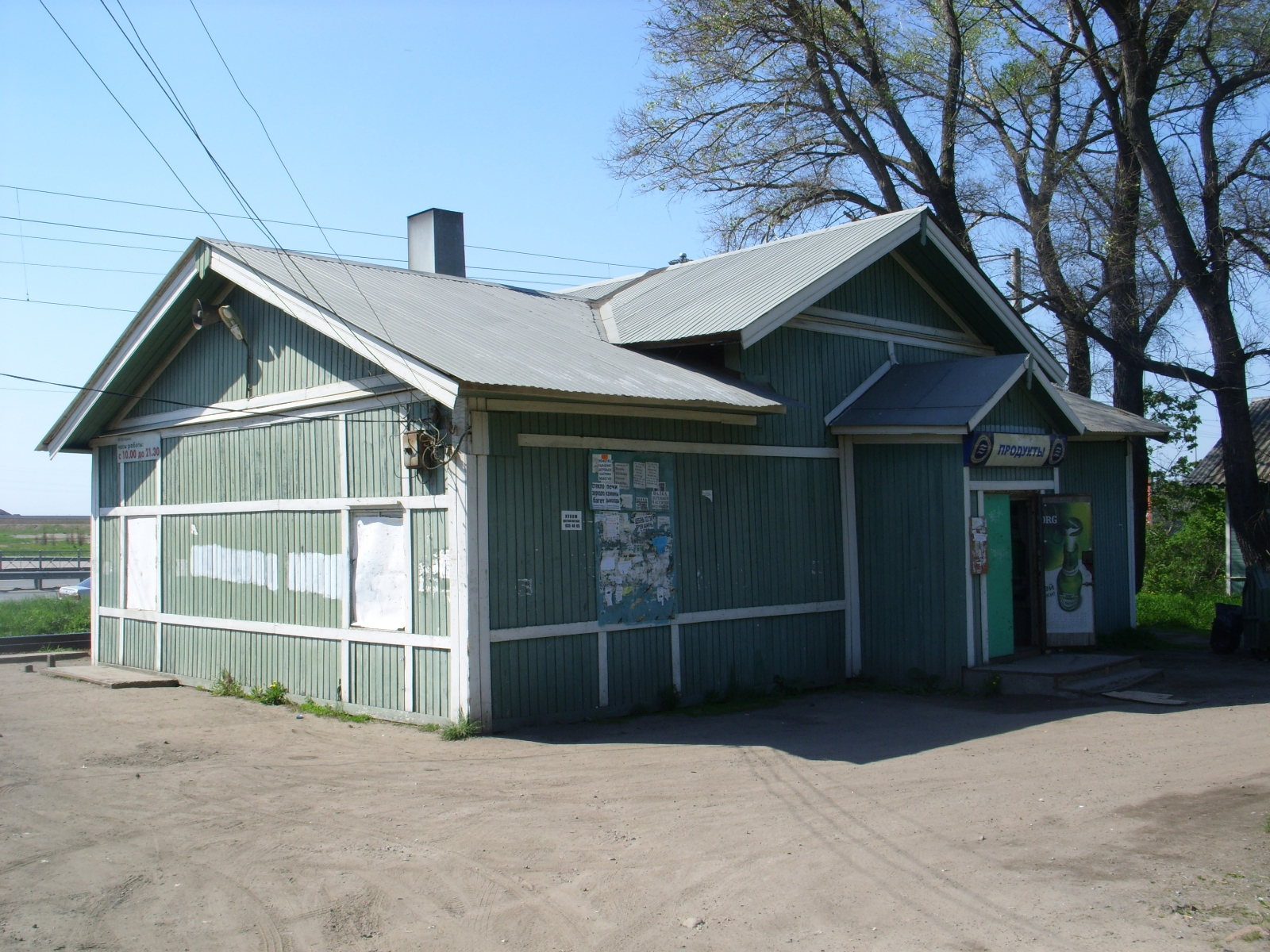
The former station building is now converted into houses a shop.

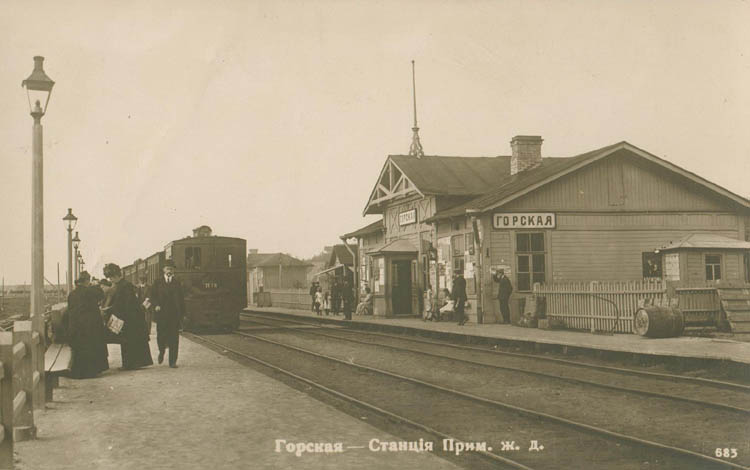
Gorskaya railway station on the Primorskaya Line in 1904.
