= Alexandrovskaya railway station =

Railway station in Saint Petersburg

Alexandrovskaya Александровская
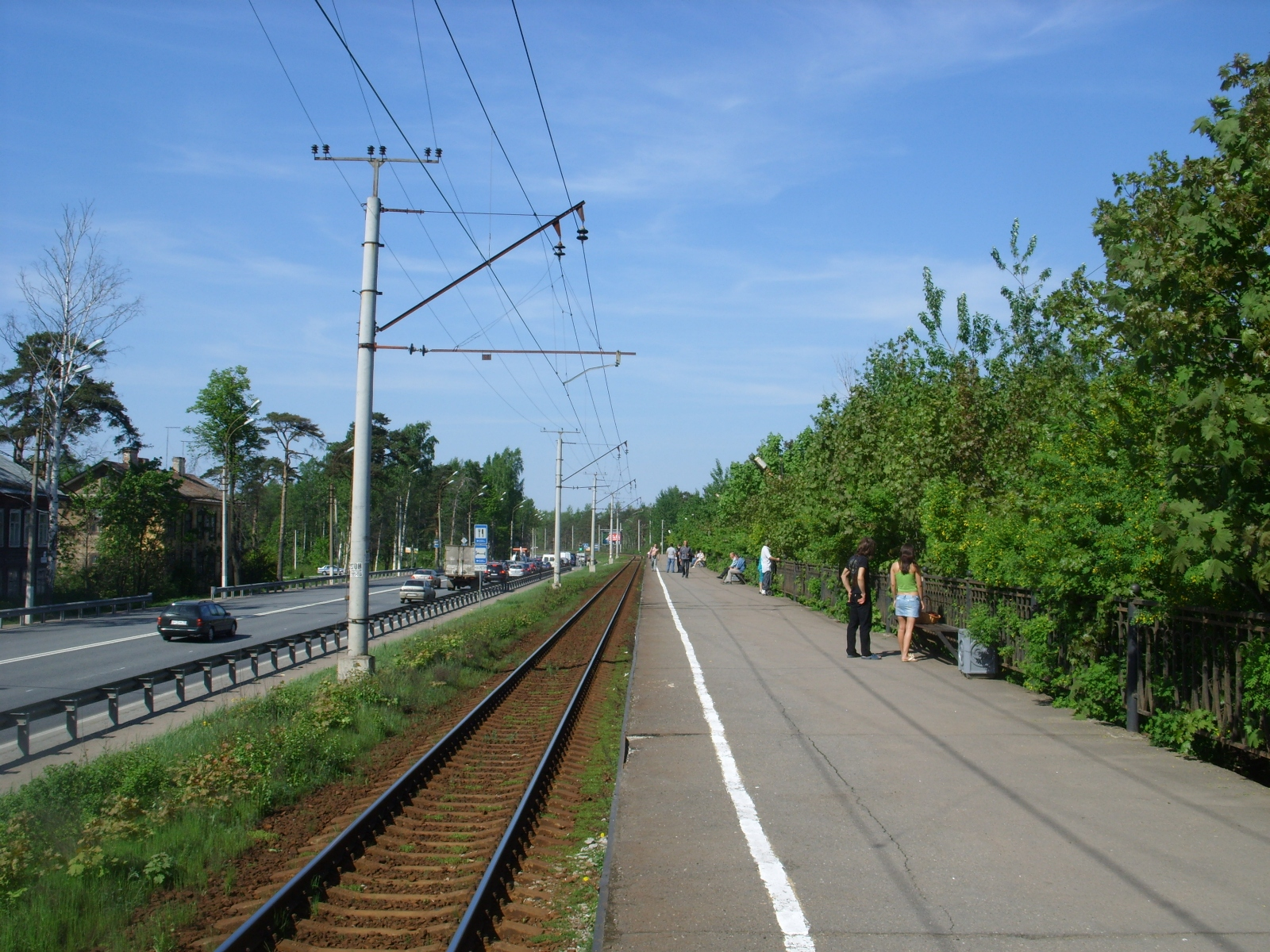

General information
- Location: Pushkinsky District; Saint Petersburg; Russia
- Coordinates: 60°2′57″N 29°58′34″E
- Owner: Russian Railways
- Operator: October Railway
- Line: Saint Petersburg Railway Division
- Platforms: 1
- Tracks: 1
- Connections: Bus: 211, 215, 216, 216A, 303

Construction
- Structure type: At-grade
- Accessible: Yes

Other information
- Station code: 039025

History
- Opened: 26 November 1894
- Electrified: 1 June 1952
- Original company: Primorskaya Railway

Services
Preceding station	Russian Railways	Following station
Tarkhovka towards Beloostrov	Saint Petersburg–Beloostrov	Gorskaya towards Saint Petersburg–Finlyandsky
Location

Alexandrovskaya (Russian: Алекса́ндровская) is a railway station on the Pushkinsky District in Saint Petersburg. It was opened on 26 November 1894, as part of the Primorskaya Line section between Razdelnaya and Sestroretsk.

The line was electrified on 1 June 1952 and high platforms were constructed. Until recently the station featured a typical wooden ticket booth, but it was destroyed by fire on 23 April 2007.
