= Razliv railway station =

Railway station in Saint Petersburg, Russia

Razliv Разлив
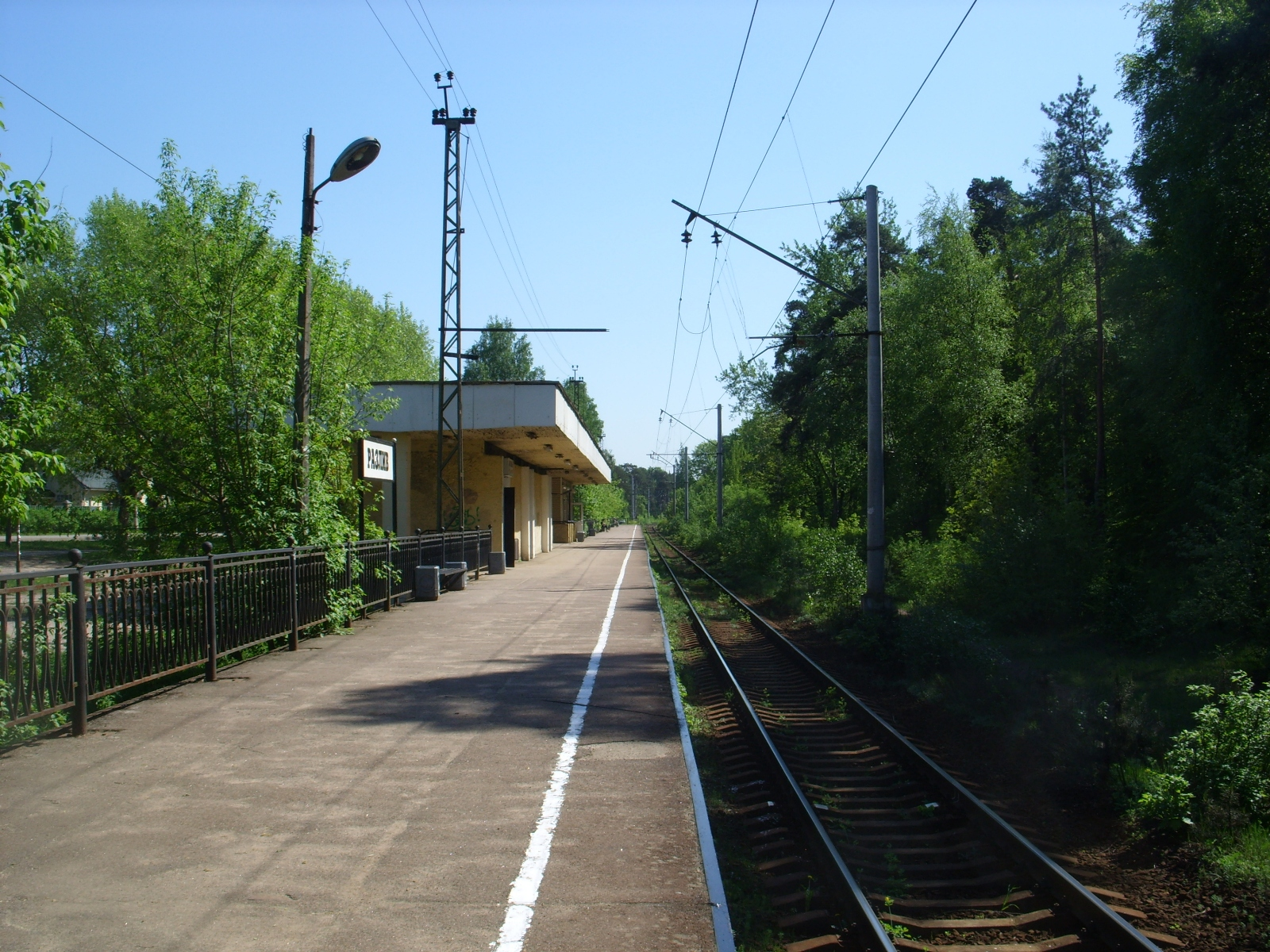

General information
- Location: Ulitsa Mosina, Razliv; Saint Petersburg; Russia
- Coordinates: 60°4′43″N 29°58′5″E
- Owner: Russian Railways
- Operator: October Railway
- Line: Saint Petersburg Railway Division
- Platforms: 1
- Tracks: 1
- Connections: Bus stop

Construction
- Structure type: At-grade

History
- Opened: 24 November 1894
- Electrified: 1 June 1952

Services
Preceding station	Russian Railways	Following station
Sestroretsk towards Beloostrov	Saint Petersburg–Beloostrov	Tarkhovka towards Saint Petersburg–Finlyandsky
Location

Razliv railway station (Russian: Ста́нция Разли́в) is a railway station in Saint Petersburg, Russia. It was built by the JSC Prinorskaya Saint Peterburg–Sestroretsk railway and opened on November 26, 1894, when the Primorskaya line was extended from Razdelnaya (now Lisy Nos) to Sestroretsk.
