= Novaya Derevnya railway station =

Railway station in Saint Petersburg, Russia

Novaya Derevnya Новая Деревня
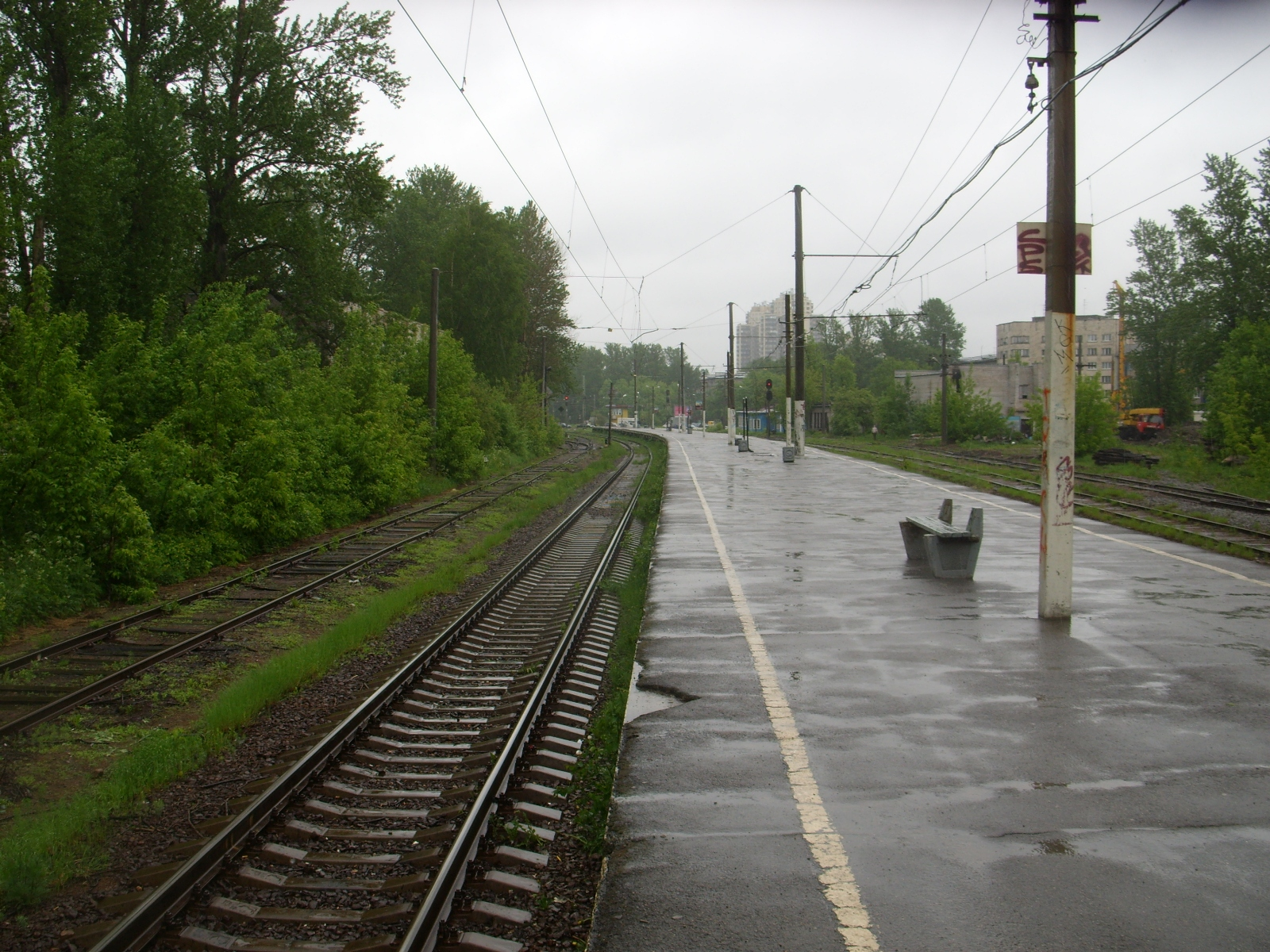

General information
- Location: Primorsky District, Saint Petersburg; Russia
- Coordinates: 59°59′29″N 30°17′47″E
- Owner: Russian Railways
- Operator: October Railway
- Platforms: 1
- Tracks: 5

Construction
- Structure type: At-grade
- Parking: Yes

Other information
- Station code: 03890
- Fare zone: 2

History
- Opened: 23 July 1893
- Electrified: 1 June 1952

Services
Preceding station	Russian Railways	Following station
Lakhta towards Beloostrov	Saint Petersburg–Beloostrov	Lanskaya towards Saint Petersburg–Finlyandsky
Former services
Preceding station	Primorskaya Railway	Following station
Shunting loop 2 verst towards Dyuny	Primorskaya Line	Primorsky Terminus
Location

Novaya Derevnya railway station (Russian: Но́вая дере́вня, lit. 'New Village') is a railway station located at the Kolomyazhskiy Prospekt overpass in Primorsky District, St. Petersburg.

The station was opened on 23 July 1893 as part of the Ozerki line built by the JSC Prinorskaya Saint Peterburg–Sestroretsk railway. It became the main station of the line and the depot and warehouses were constructed there. The wooden station building and towers behind the Severny factory fence remain as of 2009.
