= Kaupilovo railway station =

Railway station in Russia

Kaupilovo Каупилово

General information
- Coordinates: 60°1′42″N 29°59′53″E
- System: Historical station
- Line: Primorskaya line

Construction
- Structure type: At-grade

History
- Opened: 1894
- Closed: 1928

Services
| Preceding station | Primorskaya Railway | Following station |
|---|---|---|
| Gorskaya towards Dyuny | Primorskaya Line | Lisy Nos towards Primorsky |
Location

Kaupilovo (Russian: Каупи́лово), was a railway station near St. Petersburg, Russia, in 1894-1928.

The station opened on November 26, 1894, when the Primorskaya line was extended from station Razdelnaya to Sestroretsk. It was located on continuation of modern Voyennaya street, after the floods of 1924, data on station usage is not available.
