= Yakhtennaya railway station =

Railway station in Saint Petersburg, Russia

Yakhtennaya Яхтенная
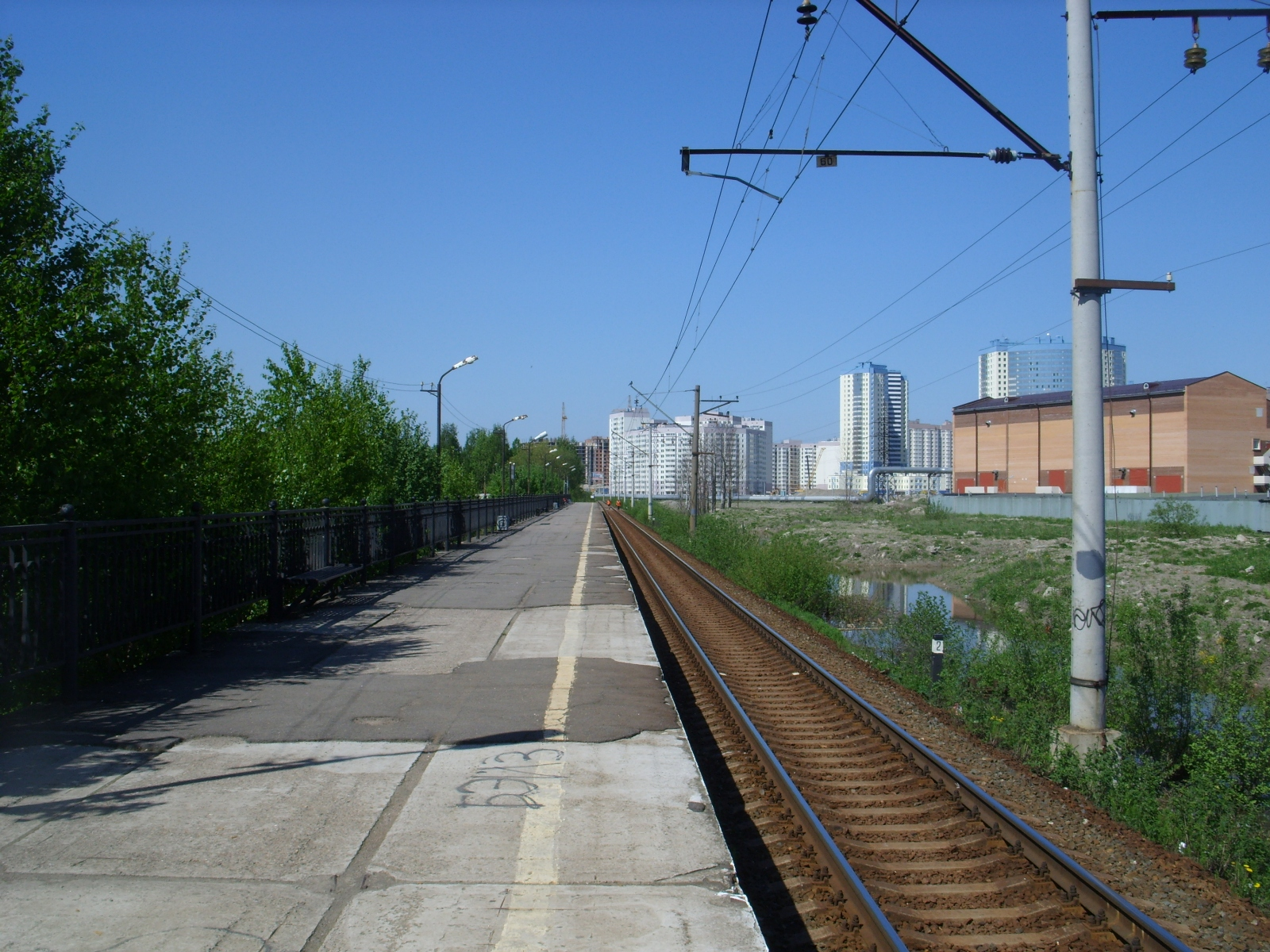

General information
- Location: Yakhtennaya Street, Primorsky District; Saint Petersburg; Russia
- Coordinates: 59°59′30″N 30°03′16″E
- Owner: Russian Railways
- Operator: October Railway
- Line: Saint Petersburg Railway Division
- Platforms: 1
- Tracks: 1

Construction
- Structure type: At-grade

Other information
- Fare zone: 3

History
- Opened: 12 July 1894
- Closed: 1924
- Rebuilt: 1998
- Former names: Shunting loop 2 verst

Services
Preceding station	Russian Railways	Following station
Lakhta towards Beloostrov	Saint Petersburg–Beloostrov	Staraya Derevnya towards Saint Petersburg–Finlyandsky
Former services
Preceding station	Primorskaya Railway	Following station
Lakhta towards Dyuny	Primorskaya Line	Novaya Derevnya towards Primorsky
Location

Yakhtennaya railway station (Russian: Платфо́рма Я́хтенная) is a railway station in Saint Petersburg, Russia, that opened in the 1990s. All trains that pass through this station stop at this station.

== History ==
Originally the JSC Primorskaya Saint Peterburg–Sestroretsk railway was constructed as Shunting loop 2 verst. This shunting loop was opened on July 12, 1894, concurrent with the opening of the railway between Novaya Derevnya and Lakhta (the first stage of the Primorskaya line).

On September 23, 1924, the shunting loop was seriously damaged during the catastrophic flooding. After the flood, the shunting loop was dismantled, and by 1925 did not exist anymore.

In the 1980s, housing construction began in the area. The current station was built to serve the residents. The station was named "13th km" until February 1999 when it was renamed "Yakhtennaya", after the street on which is built.
