= Kurort =

Railway station in Sestroretsk, Russia

Coordinates: 60.1112°N 29.9546°E

Kurort Курорт
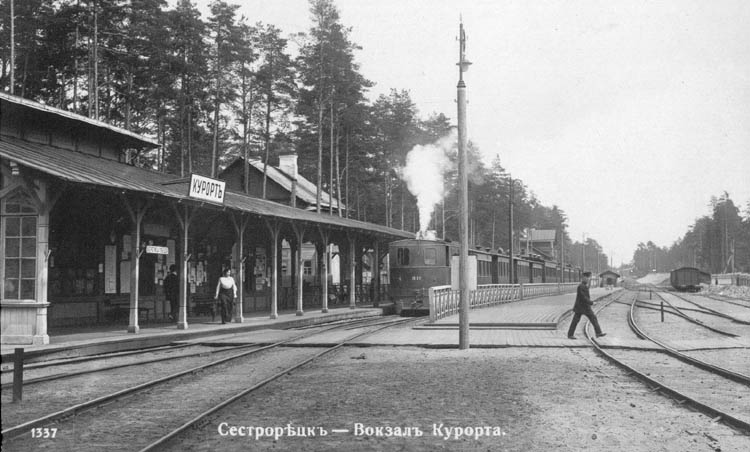
- The station in its heyday - 1900s

General information
- System: Historical railway station
- Line: Primorskaya line
- Platforms: earlier - 2, side; now - 1, side

Construction
- Structure type: At-grade

History
- Opened: 1900
- Rebuilt: 1924
- Electrified: 1952

Services
Preceding station	Primorskaya Railway	Following station
Shkolnaya towards Dyuny	Primorskaya Line	Yermolovskaya towards Primorsky
Location

Kurort (Russian: Куро́рт) is a railway station in Sestroretsk, Russia. This station is intensively used by people from St. Petersburg to access the beaches at the Gulf of Finland in summer. All over the years the station serves the numerous sanatoriums located in the nearby.

The station was constructed simultaneously with the central sanatorium, the Sestroretsk Kurort (1900). In the beginning of the 20th century, a short Kurort-Shkolnaya-Dyuny rail branch started here which is now demolished.
