= Shkolny =

Shkolny (masculine), Shkolnaya (feminine), or Shkolnoye (neuter) (Russian word meaning "school’s") may refer to:

- Shkolny, name of several rural localities in Russia
- Shkolnaya Street, a street in Moscow, Russia
- Shkolnaya railway station, a railway station of the Primorskaya railway, located near Sestroretsk, Russia
- Shkolnoye, a rural locality (a selo) in the Republic of Dagestan, Russia
