= Tarkhovka railway station =

Railway station in Saint Petersburg, Russia

Tarkhovka Тарховка
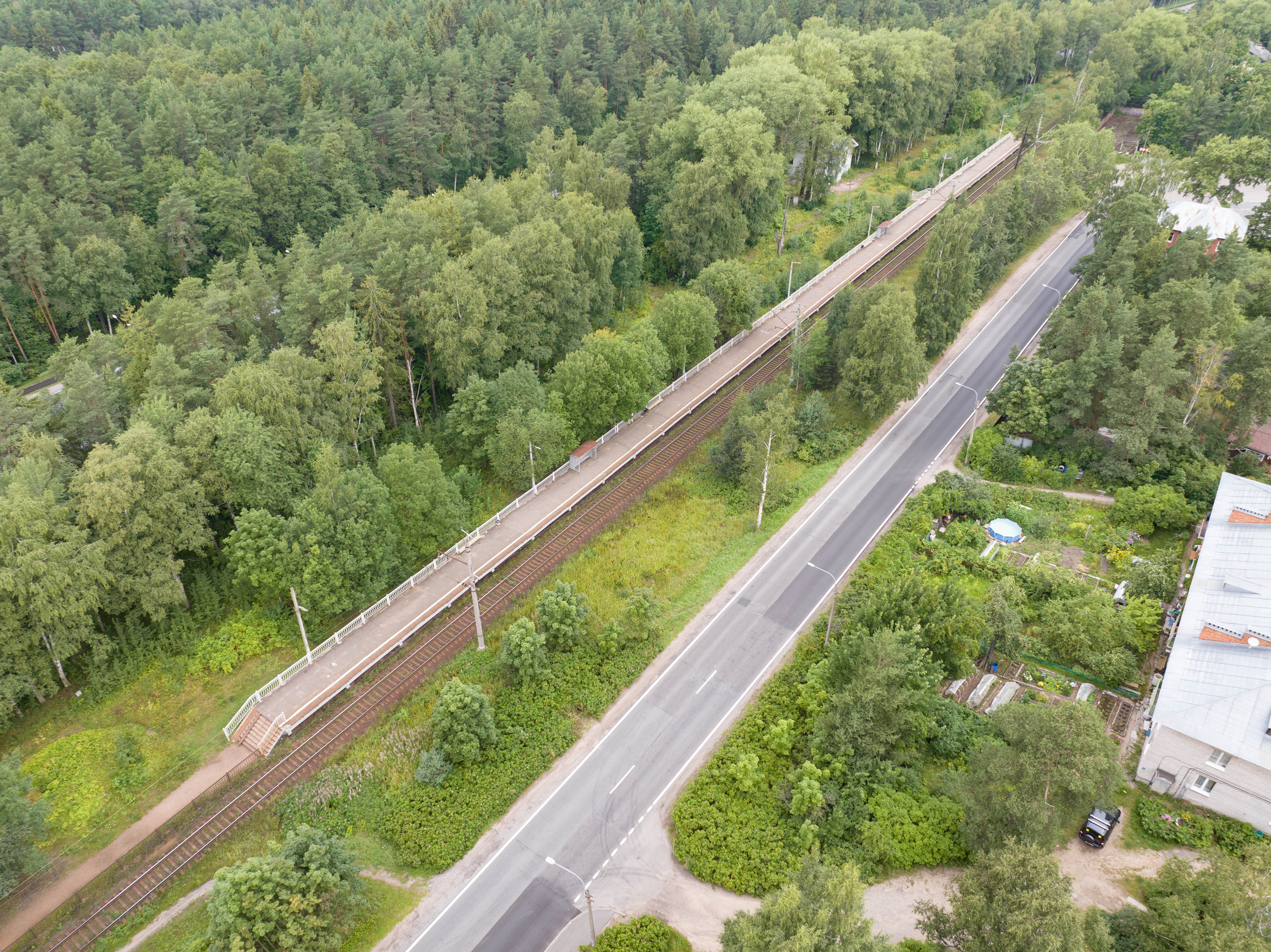
- Aerial view of the Tarkhovka station

General information
- Location: Sestroretsk, Kurortny District; Saint Petersburg; Russia
- Coordinates: 60°3′42″N 29°58′25″E
- Owner: Russian Railways
- Operator: October Railway
- Line: Saint Petersburg Railway Division
- Platforms: 1
- Tracks: 1
- Connections: Bus stop

Construction
- Structure type: At-grade

History
- Opened: 26 November 1894
- Electrified: 1 June 1952
- Original company: Primorskaya Railway

Services
Preceding station	Russian Railways	Following station
Razliv towards Beloostrov	Saint Petersburg–Beloostrov	Alexandrovskaya towards Saint Petersburg–Finlyandsky
Location

Tarkhovka (Russian: Та́рховка), is a railway station in Saint Petersburg, Russia. It was named after the former district in the city of Sestroretsk. The station opened on November 26, 1894, when the Primorskaya line was extended from Razdelnaya station to Sestroretsk.
