= Pionerskaya =

Pionerskaya metro station may refer to:

- Pionerskaya metro station (disambiguation), name of several metro stations in Russia
- Pionerskaya rail station, a closed rail station in Saint Peterburg, Russia
