= Shkolnaya railway station =

Railway station in Russia

Shkolnaya Школьная
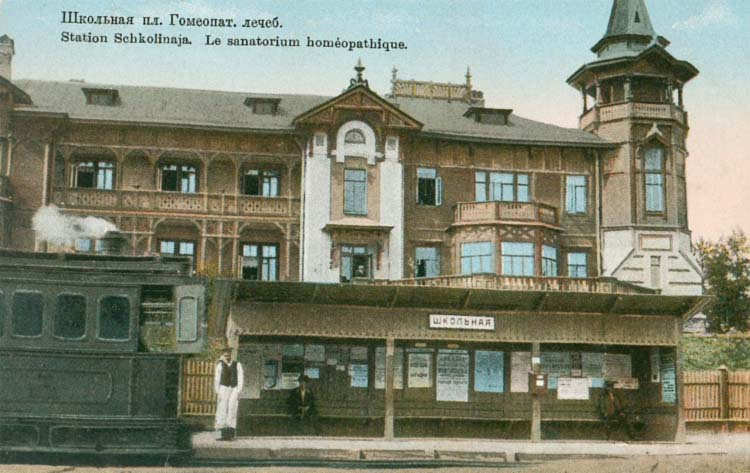
- Dune railway station in 1900s

General information
- System: Commuter service passenger station
- Line: Historical Primorskaya line
- Platforms: 1 side
- Tracks: 1

Construction
- Platform levels: Low

Services
Preceding station	Primorskaya Railway	Following station
Dyuny Terminus	Primorskaya Line	Kurort towards Primorsky
Location

Shkolnaya railway station (Russian: Ста́нция Шко́льная) is a former railway station located near Sestroretsk (suburb of Saint Petersburg), Russia. The station functioned within the first two decades of the 20th century, presently it doesn't exist.

It was built by the Joint-stock company of the Primorskaya St.-Petersburg-Sestroretsk railway. Shkolnaya was the only stop of trains on the short Kurort-to-Dyuny branch (this branch is now demolished, just the Kurort station is still in service).
