= Yuny railway station =

Railway station in Saint Petersburg, Russia

Yuny Юный

General information
- Coordinates: 60°1′32″N 30°17′43″E
- System: October Railway platform
- Owner: Russian Railways
- Operator: October Railway
- Platforms: 2
- Tracks: 2

Construction
- Structure type: At-grade

History
- Opened: 23 July 1893 (original); 27 August 1948 (MOZD)
- Closed: 1927
- Rebuilt: 1955
- Former names: Grafskiy Pavilion
- Pre-nationalisation: Primorskaya Railway

Services
Preceding station	October Railway	Following station
Ozyornaya Terminus	Small October Railway	Terminus
Location

Yuny station (Russian: Ста́нция Ю́ный) is a railway station located in St. Petersburg, Russia.

It was constructed by the JSC Primorskaya Saint Peterburg–Sestroretsk railway and was opened as part of the Ozerki line on July 23, 1893, under the name Grafskiy Pavilion (in translation - Count pavilion).

In 1948, the narrow-gauge Small October railway was created here. In 1955, platforms were constructed and the station received the name Yuny.

== Landmarks near Yuny station ==
Russian poet Maximilian Voloshin mentions the station Grafskiy Pavilion in his diary and reports that there was a summer residence here at which, in May 1926, Maxim Gorky and Anton Chekhov met one of their notability unidentified people.
