= Lisy Nos railway station (1894–1928) =

Lisy Nos Лисий нос
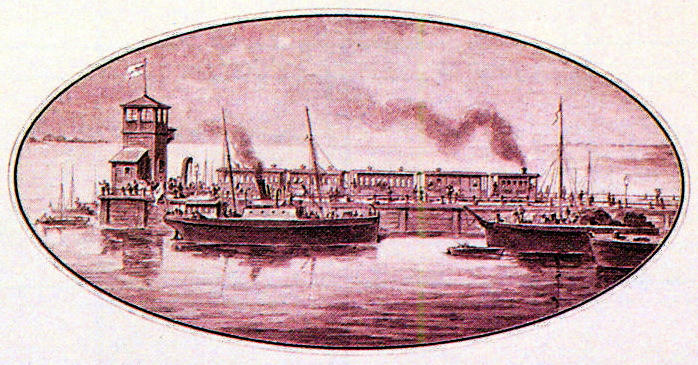
- View to pier in Primorskaya railroad share.

General information
- Location: Lisy Nos, Primorsky District; Saint Petersburg; Russia
- Coordinates: 60°0′37″N 29°27′51″E
- Connections: Lisy Nos–Kronstadt Ferry

Construction
- Structure type: At-grade

Other information
- Status: Defunct

History
- Opened: 31 October 1894
- Closed: 1928

Former services
Preceding station	Primorskaya Railway	Following station
Terminus	Primorskaya Line Lateral branch	Razdelnaya Terminus
Location

Lisy Nos (Russian: Ли́сий нос) was a railway station in Lisy Nos, Saint Petersburg, Russia. The station was on a wooden landing stage on the bank of the Gulf of Finland. Near the station, there was a wooden building forming the ancient orthodox church of Saint Alexander Nevsky.

The station opened on October 31, 1894, when it was constructed on a branch line from Razdelnaya station.

A steam locomotive with two or three carriages brought passengers along the branch line from Razdelnaya station. A passenger ferry from Lisy Nos to Kronstadt connected with the trains.

The old Lisy Nos station was closed in 1928 and the Razdelnaya station was renamed as "Lisy Nos".
