= Lakhta railway station =

Railway station in Saint Petersburg, Russia

Coordinates: 59.9945°N 30.1525°E

Lakhta Лахта
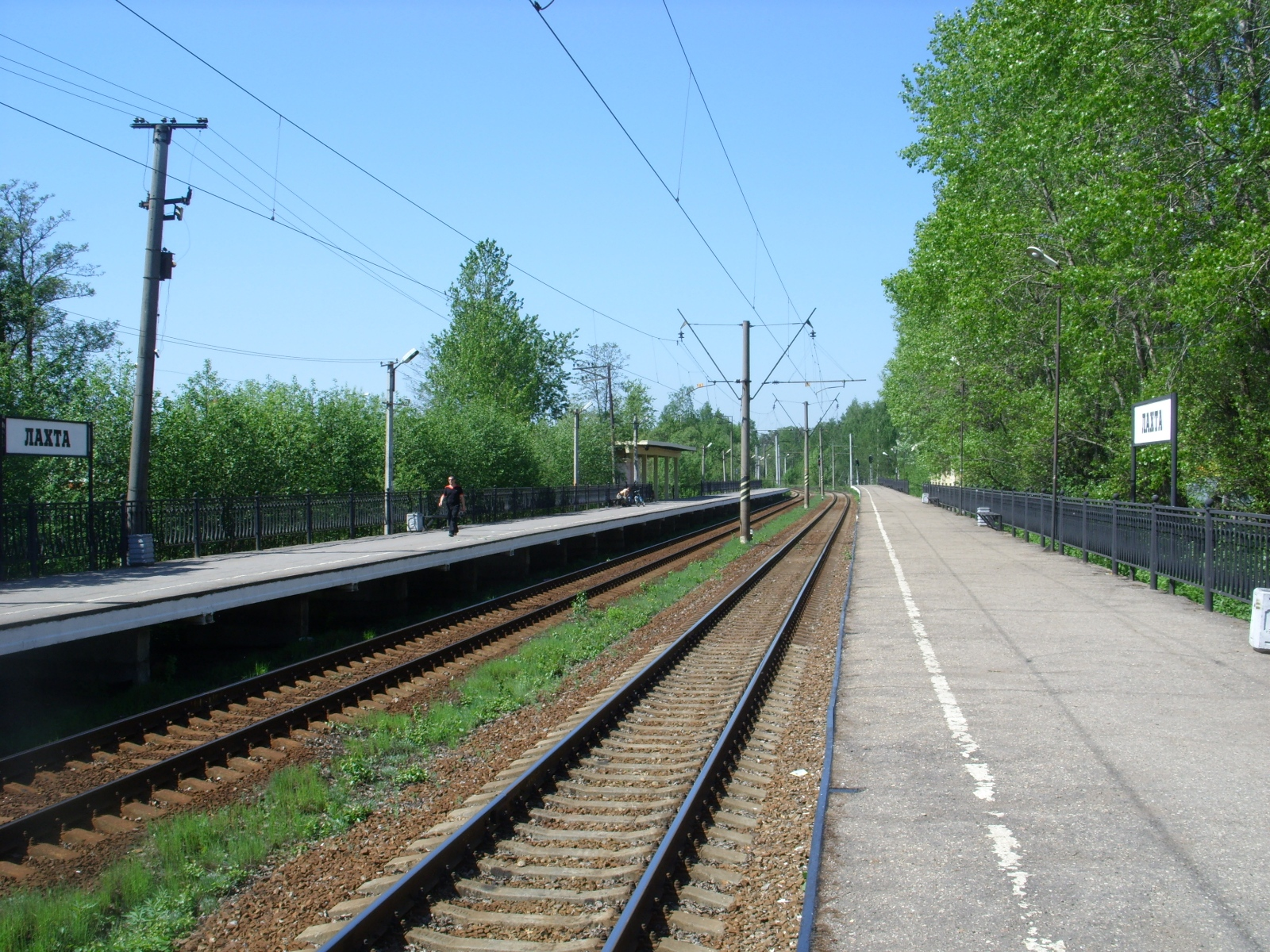
- Platform view of the Lakhta railway station (2010).

General information
- Location: 2 Vokzal'naya Ulitsa, Lakhta-Olgino Municipal Okrug; Saint Petersburg; Russia
- Owner: Russian Railways
- Operator: October Railway
- Line: Saint Petersburg Railway Division
- Platforms: 2
- Tracks: 2

Construction
- Structure type: At-grade

Other information
- Station code: 03891
- Fare zone: 3

History
- Opened: 12 July 1894
- Electrified: 1 June 1952

Services
Preceding station	Russian Railways	Following station
Olgino towards Beloostrov	Saint Petersburg–Beloostrov	Yakhtennaya towards Saint Petersburg–Finlyandsky

Former services
Preceding station	Primorskaya Railway	Following station
Lisy Nos towards Dyuny	Primorskaya Line	Shunting loop 2 verst towards Primorsky
Location

Lakhta railway station (Russian: Ста́нция Ла́хта) is a railway station in Saint Petersburg, Russia. It was named after the historical district of Lakhta-Olgino Municipal Okrug.

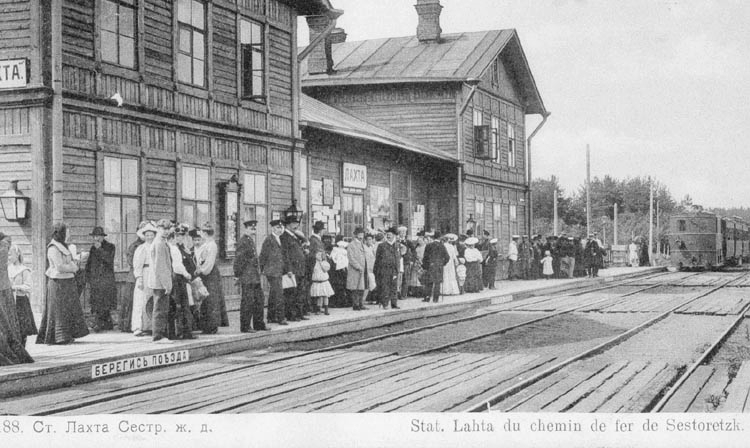
Lakhta railway station in 1900s

The station was built by JSC Prinorskaya St. Peterburg–Sestroretsk railway and it was opened on 12 July 1894 as part of the opening section between Uzlovaya and Lakhta. It was considered as a terminal until on 31 October 1894, the line was lengthened to Razdelnaya, what is now Lisy Nos railway station.
