= Skachki railway station =

Railway station in Saint Petersburg, Russia

Skachki
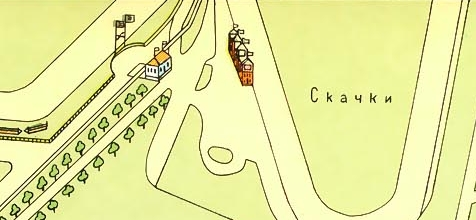
- Station on a city scheme of 1913

General information
- Coordinates: 59°59′48″N 30°18′4″E
- System: Commuter service passenger station
- Line: Historical Ozerki line
- Platforms: 1
- Tracks: 1

Construction
- Platform levels: Low

History
- Opened: 1889
- Closed: 1927

Services
Preceding station	Primorskaya Railway	Following station
Ozyornaya towards Ozerki	Ozerki Line	Primorsky Terminus
Location

Skachki platform (Russian: платфо́рма Ска́чки) was a railway platform located in St. Petersburg, Russia.

It was constructed in 1889 by the Joint-stock company of the Prinorskaya St.-Peterburg-Sestroretsk railway on the existing Ozerki line to serve the Hippodrome in Kolomyagi.
