= Zavodskaya sestra crossover =

Zavodskaya sestra crossover Russian: Переход через реку Заводская Сестра
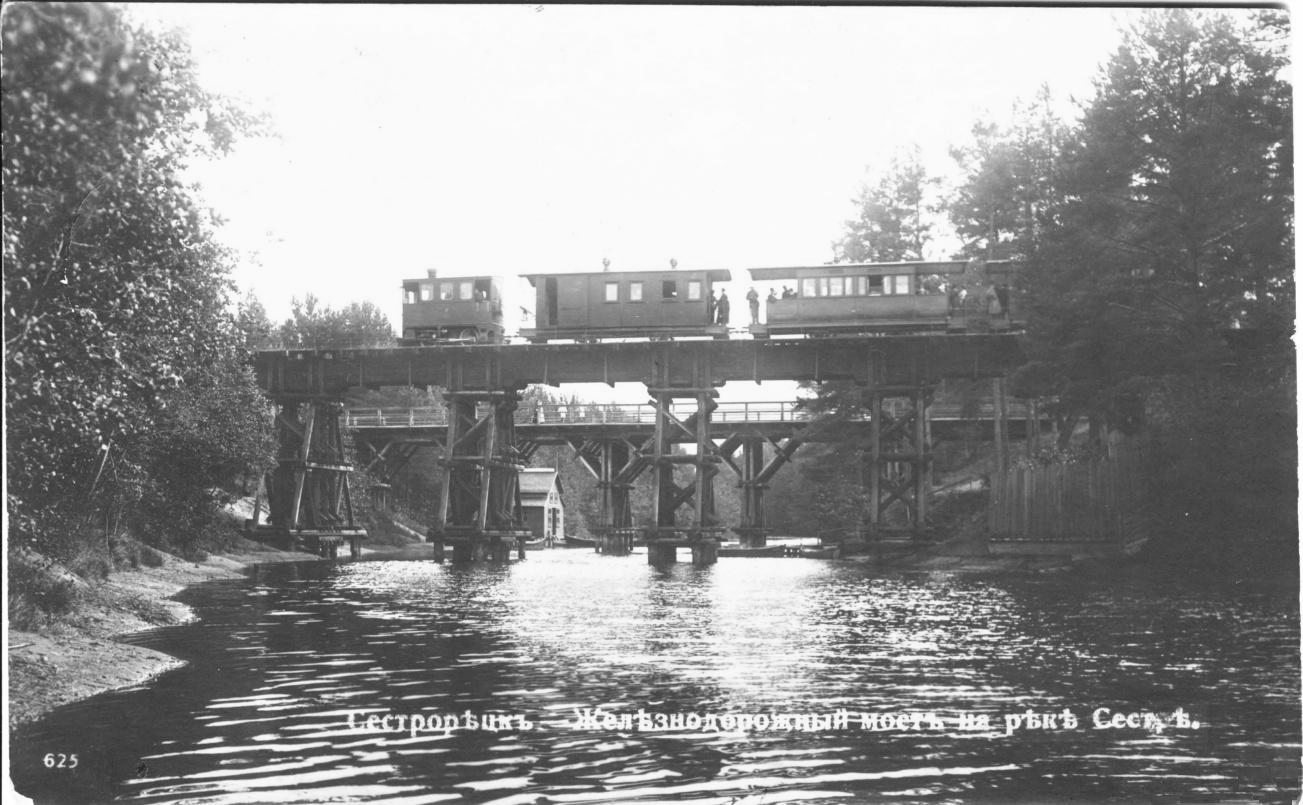
- Bridge in 1900s
- Coordinates: 60°06′40″N 29°57′39″E
- Carries: Railroad
- Crosses: Zavodskaya sestra river
- Locale: Sestroretsk, near Saint Peterburg Russia
- Maintained by: Primorskaya line, Joint-stock company of the Prinorskaya St.-Peterburg-Sestroretsk railway

Characteristics
- Design: Now - metal bridge on stone support
- Material: Metal
- Width: 1 track way

History
- Designer: engineer P. A. Avenarius

Location
- Interactive map of Zavodskaya sestra crossover Russian: Переход через реку Заводская Сестра

Zavodskaya sestra crossover is a railway bridge across Zavodskaya Sestra River. The engineer was P. A. Avenarius.
