= Lisy Nos railway station =

Railway station in Saint Petersburg, Russia

Coordinates: 60.0139°N 30.013°E

Lisy Nos Лисий Нос
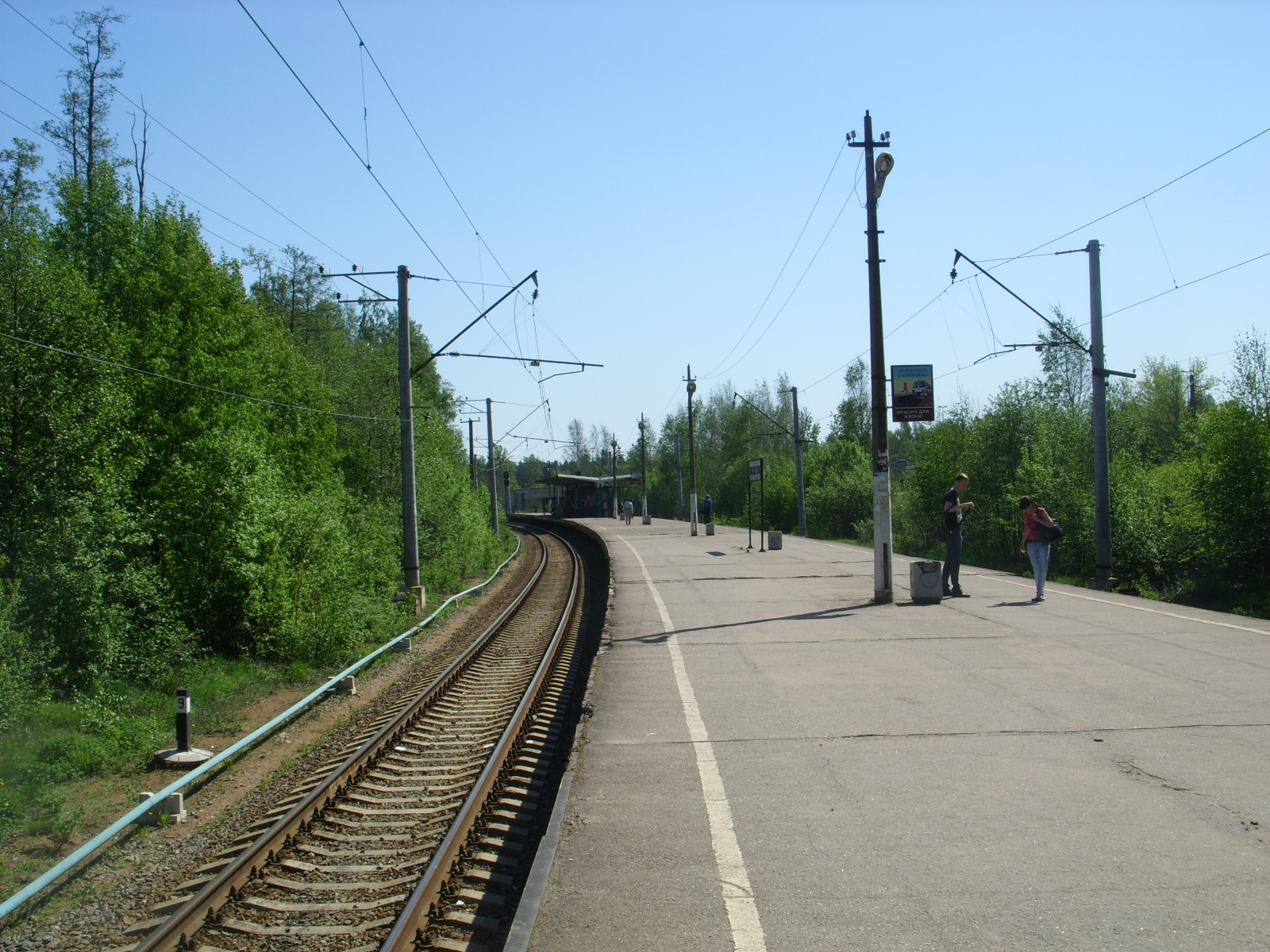

General information
- Location: Lisy Nos, Primorsky District; Saint Petersburg; Russia
- Owner: Russian Railways
- Operator: October Railway
- Line: Saint Petersburg Railway Division
- Platforms: 1 island platform
- Tracks: 2

Construction
- Structure type: At-grade

History
- Opened: 31 October 1894
- Electrified: 1 June 1952
- Former names: Razdelnaya

Services
Preceding station	Russian Railways	Following station
Gorskaya towards Beloostrov	Saint Petersburg–Beloostrov	Olgino towards Saint Petersburg–Finlyandsky
Former services
Preceding station	Primorskaya Railway	Following station
Kaupilovo towards Dyuny	Primorskaya Line	Lakhta towards Primorsky
Lisy Nos Terminus	Primorskaya Line Lateral branch	Terminus
Location

Lisy Nos railway station (Russian: Ста́нция Ли́сий нос, lit. 'Fox Nose') is a railway station in Lisy Nos, St. Petersburg, Russia.

It was built by the JSC Prinorskaya Saint Peterburg–Sestroretsk railway and opened on 31 October 1894 as part of the Primorskaya line Lakhta–Razdelnaya section, under the name "Razdelnaya".

The station was renamed "Lisy Nos" in 1928, following the closure of the branch line to old Lisy Nos station which was on a landing stage on Kronstadt Bay.

== Gallery ==
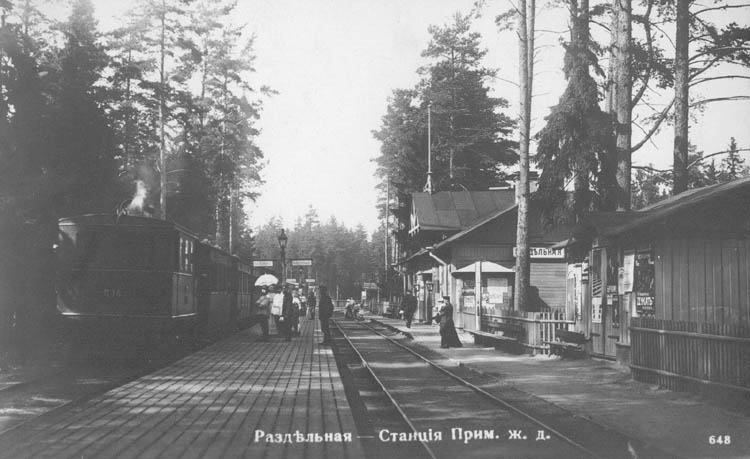
Razdelnaya railway station in 1900s

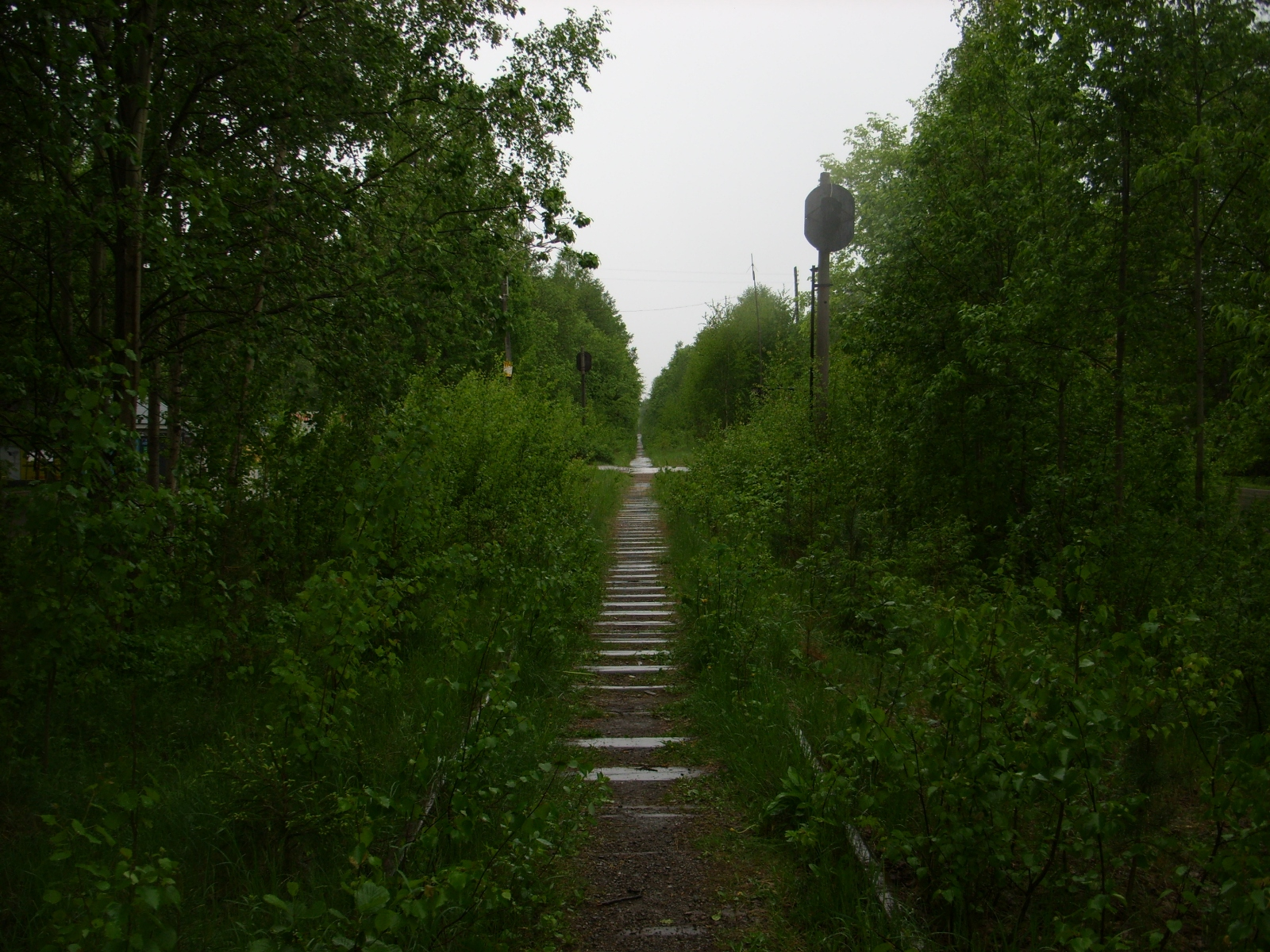
Remaining old tracks towards to Lisy Nos Export and old Lisy Nos station
