= Ozyornaya railway station =

Railway station in Saint Petersburg, Russia

Ozyornaya Озёрная
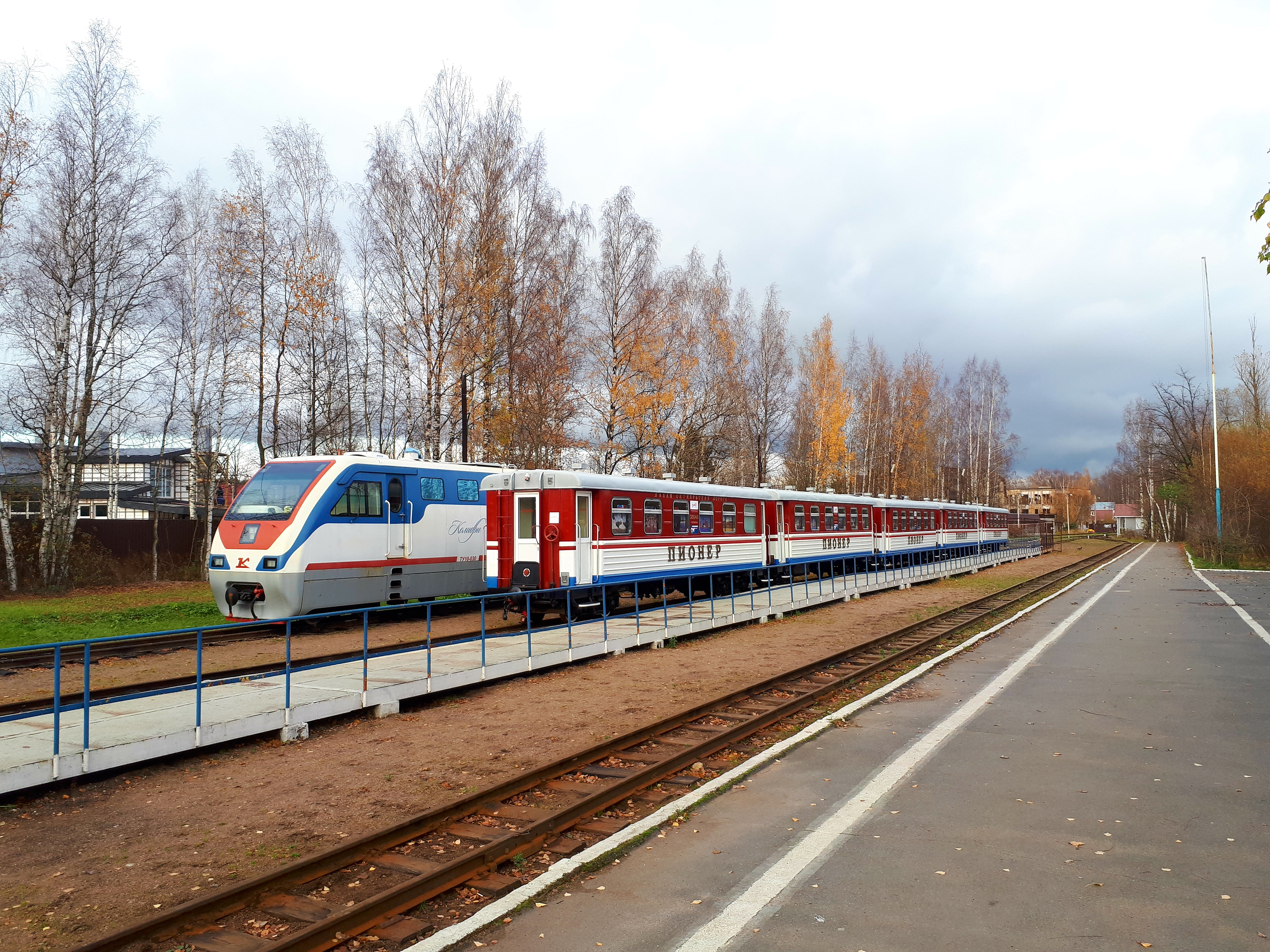
- Small October Railway trains at the Ozernaya Station

General information
- Location: Chistyakovskaya street, 1A. Primorsky District; Saint Petersburg; Russia
- Coordinates: 60°2′21″N 30°17′47″E
- Owner: Russian Railways
- Operator: October Railway
- Platforms: 2
- Tracks: 3

Construction
- Structure type: At-grade

History
- Opened: 23 July 1893 (original); 27 August 1948 (MOZD)
- Closed: 1927
- Rebuilt: 1948
- Former names: Ozerki
- Pre-nationalisation: Primorskaya Railway

Services
Preceding station	October Railway	Following station
Terminus	Small October Railway	Yuny Terminus
Former services
Preceding station	Primorskaya Railway	Following station
Terminus	Ozerki Line	Grafskiy Pavilion towards Primorsky
Location

Ozyornaya station (Russian: Ста́нция Озёрная) is a railway station located in St. Petersburg, Russia.

It was constructed by the JSC Prinorskaya Saint Peterburg–Sestroretsk railway and was opened on 23 July 1893 as part of the Ozerki line under the name "Ozerki".

It was rebuilt and re-opened on 27 August 1948, as a part of the narrow-gauge Malaya October Railway.

== Gallery ==
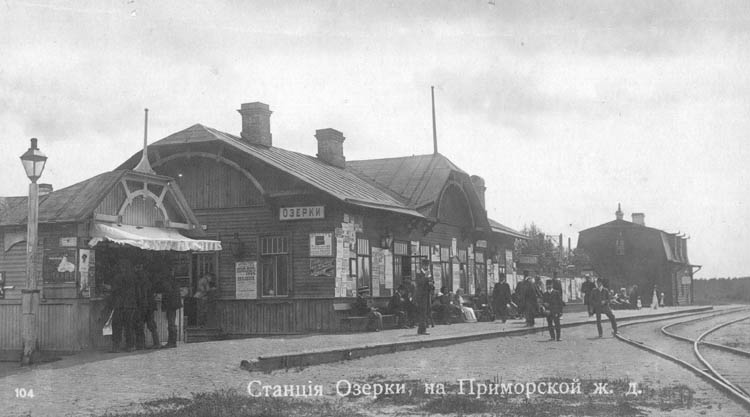
Original station in the 1900s decade, as part of the Primorskaya Railway
