= Zoopark =

Zoopark may refer to:

- Zoopark-1, the truck-mounted Russian radar system
- Zoopark (band), Russian rock band
- Zoopark railway station, Railway station located in St Petersburg
- a later name of the Selig Zoo in Los Angeles

== See also ==
- Farm park or animal park
