= Pionersky =

Pionersky (masculine), Pionerskaya (feminine), or Pionerskoye (neuter) may refer to:

- Pionersky, Kaliningrad Oblast, a town in Kaliningrad Oblast, Russia
- Pionersky, Khanty-Mansi Autonomous Okrug, an urban-type settlement in Khanty-Mansi Autonomous Okrug, Russia
- Pionersky, Sverdlovsk Oblast, an urban-type settlement in Sverdlovsk Oblast, Russia
- Pionerskaya metro station (disambiguation), name of several metro stations in Russia
- Pionerskaya railway station, name of closed railway stations in Saint Peterburg, Russia.
- Pionerskaya Station (Antarctica), a Soviet station in Antarctica
- Pionerskoye, a rural locality in Leningrad Oblast, Russia
