= Ozerki line =

Railway line in Russia

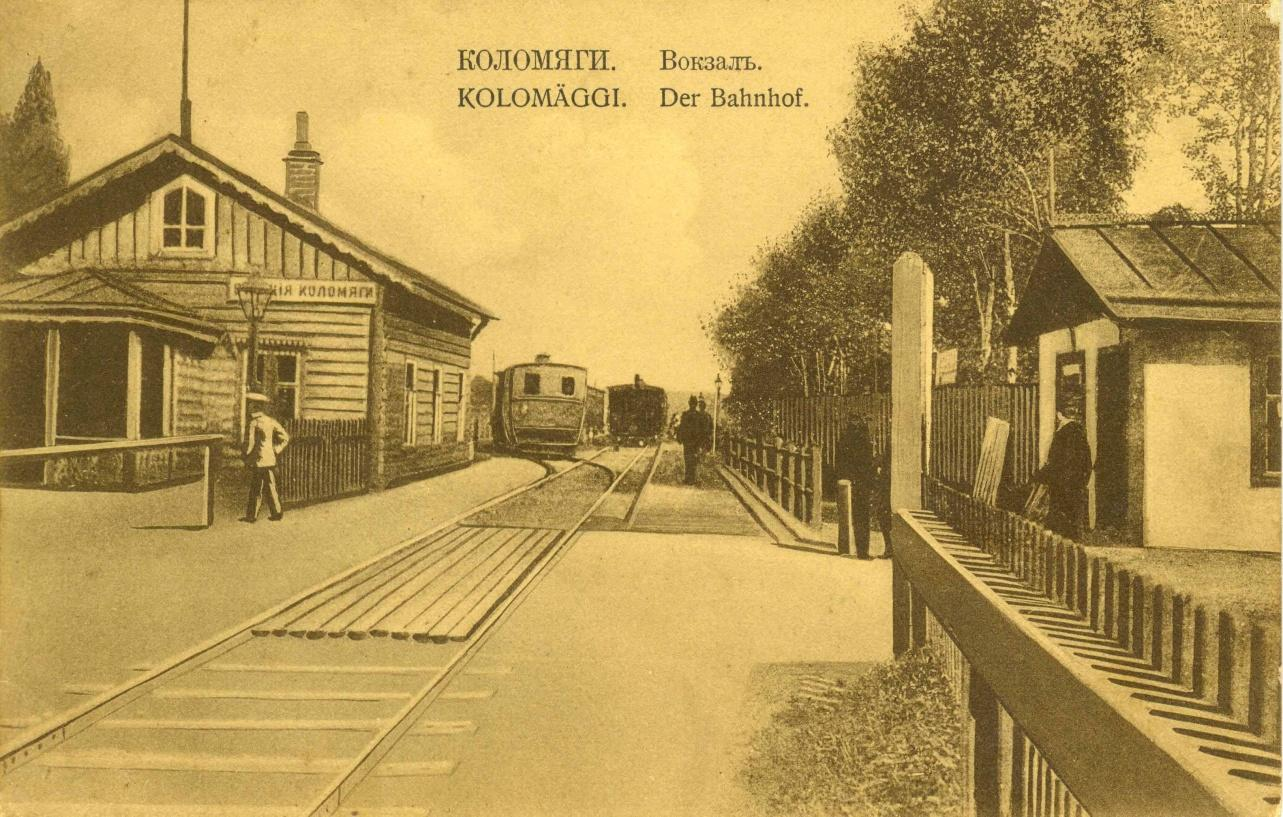
- One of line stations - "Kolomuagi"

Overview
- Native name: линия в Озерки
- Status: Defunct
- Locale: Saint Petersburg
- Termini: Primorsky Rail Terminal (1893–1924); Novaya Derevnya (1924–1929); Ozerki
- Stations: 5

Service
- Type: Light rail
- Operator: Primorskaya Railway

History
- Opened: 1893
- Closed: 1929

Technical
- Line length: 6.2 km (3.9 mi)
- Track gauge: 1,524 mm (5 ft)

The Ozerki line was the first line constructed by the Primorskaya Railway in Saint Petersburg, Russia. It was opened on July 23, 1893, and closed in 1929.

== Route ==
- Primorsky, 0 km
- Skachki, 2.0 km
- Kolomyagi 3.0 km
- Grafskiy Pavilion 5.0 km
- Ozyornaya, 6.2 km
