= Shkolnaya Street =

Thoroughfare in Moscow, Russia

Coordinates: 55°44′43″N 37°40′23″E

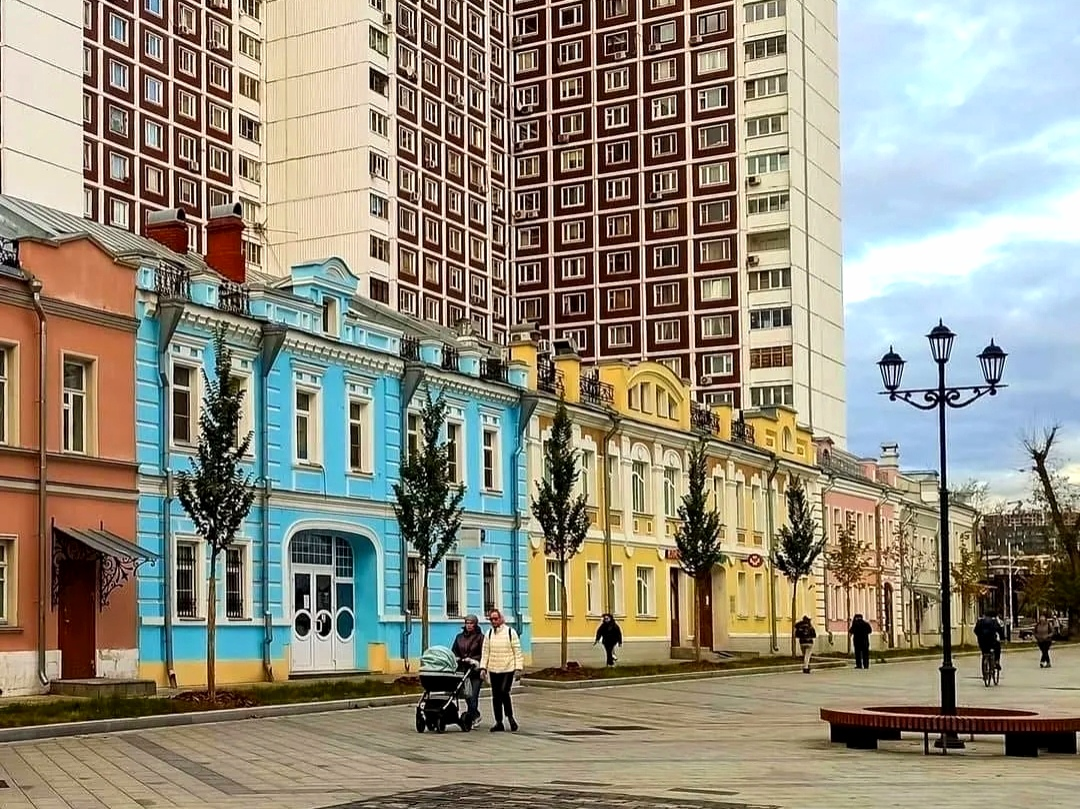
- Interactive map of Shkolnaya Street
- Native name: Школьная улица (Russian)
- Length: 0.7 km (0.43 mi)
- Location: Moscow, Russia; Central Administrative Okrug; Tagansky District
- Nearest metro station: Rimskaya; Ploshchad Ilyicha

Shkolnaya Street (Russian: Школьная улица, Shkolnaya ulitsa) is a partially pedestrian street in Tagansky District of Moscow and connects Dobrovolcheskaya Street in the west with Rogozhskaya Zastava Square in the east. The street's heritage area consists of two-storey 19th century buildings.

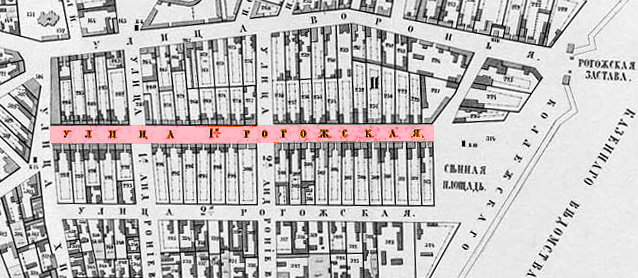
Rows of inns along First Rogozhskaya (now Shkolnaya) Street on an 1853 map.

Historically, it was known as First Rogozhskaya Street, the main trading street of the former Rogozhskaya Yam sloboda, and acquired its current name, one of the most common in Soviet propagandistic toponymy, in 1923.

== History ==
=== Coachmen's sloboda ===
Rogozhskaya sloboda of yam coachmen serving the mail route to Vladimir and Ryazan was established as an eastern suburb of Moscow in the late 16th century. The name of the sloboda and its streets goes back to Rogozhi (now Noginsk, another Soviet name), the first overnight station on the Vladimirka road. In the second half of the 18th century, the area experienced an influx of Old Believers, a persecuted religious minority that was allowed to practice their faith in an out-of-town Rogozhskoye Cemetery; the entrepreneurial and secretive dissidents formed a unique business community west of the coachmen's sloboda and contributed to the industrialization of Eastern Moscow in the 19th century.

By 1848, First Rogozhskaya Street, one block south from the main Vladimirka road, was firmly established as the principal trading street of the sloboda (this is evidenced by black facade lines on contemporary maps indicating a continuous brick store front within a largely wooden neighborhood). Most of these building also housed inns and pubs for the coachmen; wooden coaches and flammable goods stored inside their spacious back yards contributed to accidental fires that regularly swept the sloboda.

=== Advent of railroads ===
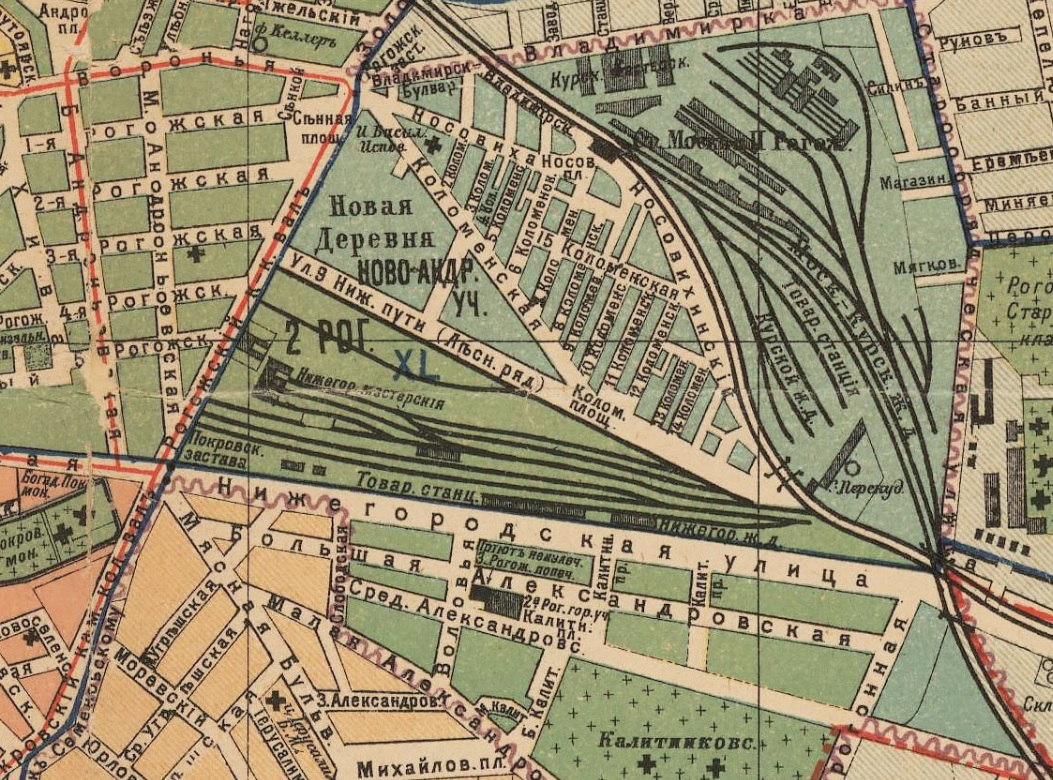
Rogozshkaya Sloboda (left) and railroad yards in Tagansky District by 1914. The southernmost cluster of train tracks marks the site of old Nizhny Novgorod terminal

The 1861 opening of a railroad terminal connecting Moscow to Nizhny Novgorod spelled the end of the coachmen's business but boosted the Old Believers' community. Railroad owners placed the terminal east of Rogozhsky Val Street (then the eastern city limit of Moscow), right across the sloboda, to save on cost of land. In 1896, passenger terminal was relocated downtown to present-day Kursky railway terminal; freight yards on the site of the old terminal operated until the 1950s. According to opera tenor Pavel Bogatyryov, a native of Rogozhskaya Sloboda whose father owned a slaughterhouse and an inn with an underground blood sport pit, the coachmen and associated innkeeping business agonized until a disastrous three-day fire in 1886. The sloboda was rebuilt by different owners.

In 1910, the city built an electrical substation for the sprawling tramway system on the corner of First Rogozhskaya and Bolshaya Andronyevskaya, the building stands to date. Trams serving the street ran through the parallel Voronya (later Tulinskaya, now Sergia Radonezskogo) Street, the old Vladimirka; in 1952, when service through Tulinskaya was shut down to make way for car traffic, tram tracks were relocated to Shkolnaya Street. Service through Shkolnaya was shut down in 1980; lines on adjacent Rogozhsky Val and Bolshaya Andronyevskaya operate to date (November 2009).

First Rogozhskaya street was renamed Shkolnaya (literally School Street) in 1923; in the same year nearby Second Rogozhskaya became Bibliotechnaya (Library Street). The 2007 Streets of Moscow reference does not cite any particular reason for the renaming apart from abstract "cultural change" following the Bolshevik Revolution. Curiously, when Moscow city limits were expanded in 1960 and the city incorporated dozens of former independent towns and villages, the number of Shkolnaya Streets in the city exploded from one to eighteen (not including nine Shkolny Lanes); in the following two decades the number shrank back to one as the former villages were razed by the Soviet government for new high-rise housing.

=== Reconstruction ===
In the 1970s and 1980s, most of the historic Rogozhskaya Sloboda itself was demolished by the Soviet regime and replaced with concrete high-rise buildings. The westernmost blocks of Shkolnaya Street, too, disappeared to make way for a regional Sberbank office. The rest of Shkolnaya Street, however, was earmarked to become a refurbished pedestrian "historical zone", not unlike Arbat Street on a smaller scale. Reconstruction began in 1985 and continued until 1989. Two-storey buildings on both sides of the street received a facelift, with groundfloor windows and gates imitating 19th century shopping outlets; a look at the back of these houses reveals facadist rebuilding in concrete and modern masonry.

The street, however, did not become a shopping attraction; the plan to open an ethnographic museum failed; the buildings on Shkolnaya are used for offices and on weekdays the "pedestrian" street is taken over by parked cars (transit traffic through Shkolnaya is physically blocked by concrete barriers but the street is accessible through side alleys). On weekends, the eastern half of Shkolnaya Street becomes a marketplace. In 2007, the city issued a permit for Moscow's first legitimate downtown flea market to be held there.

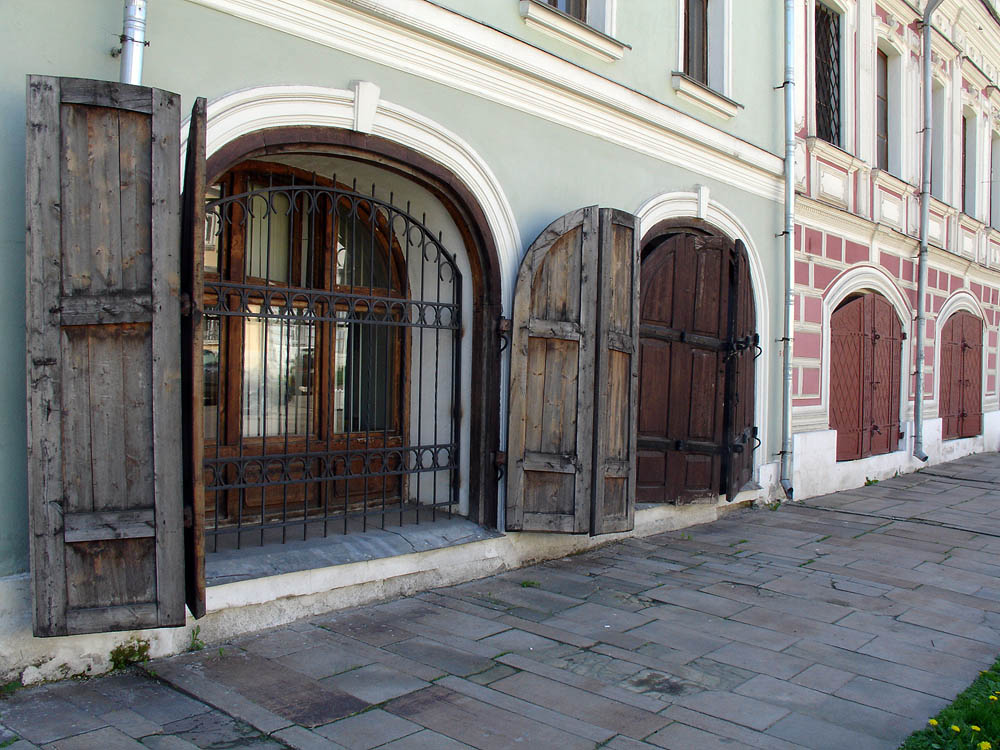

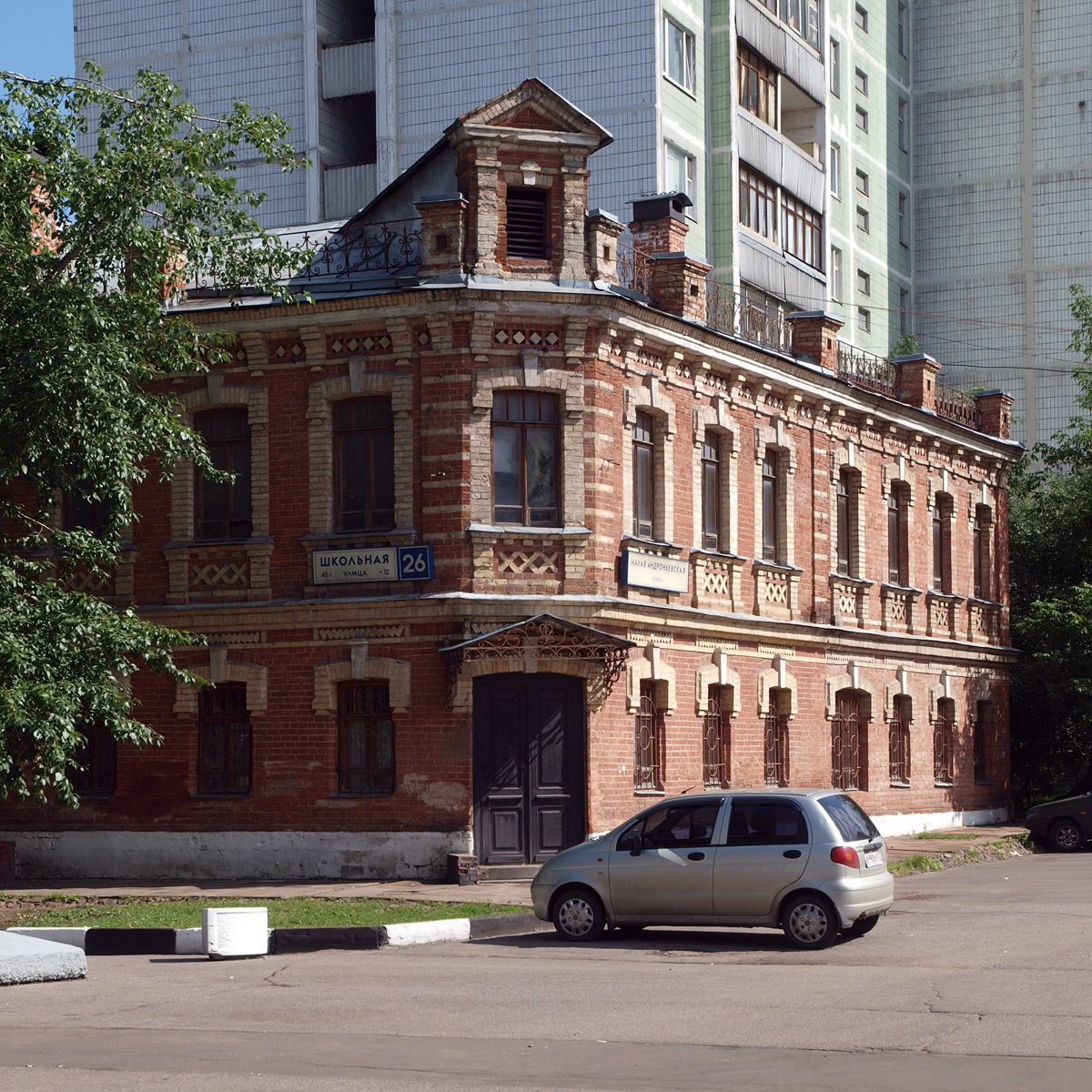

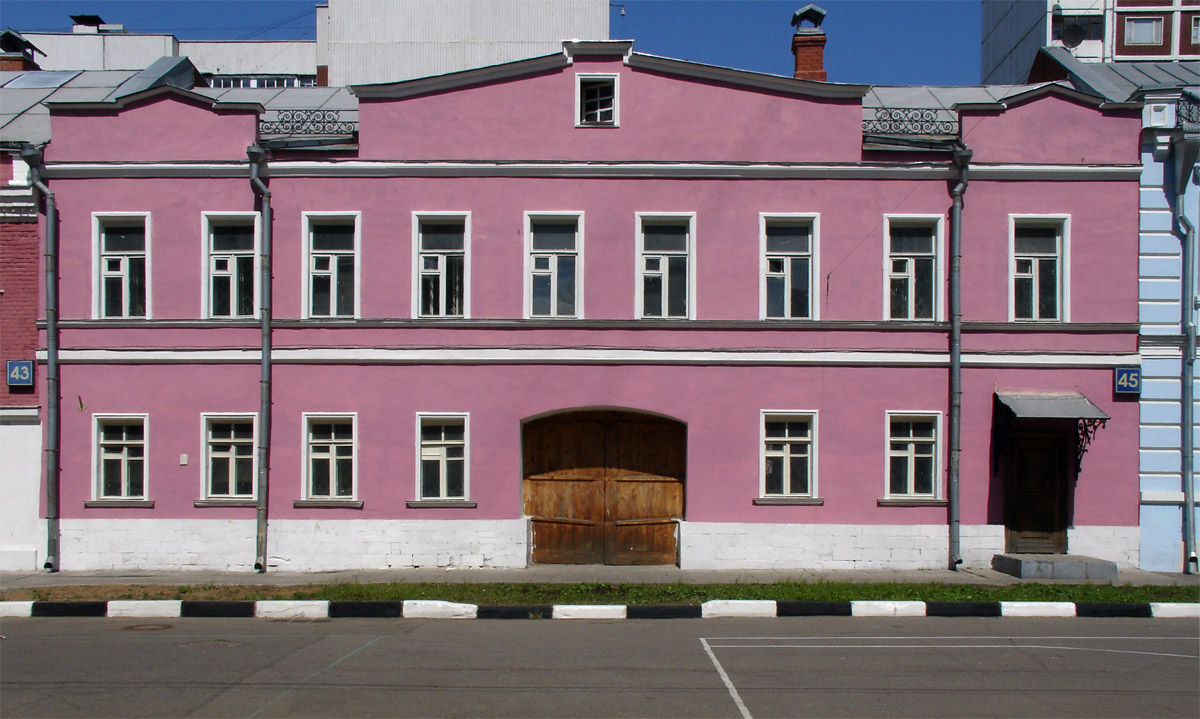

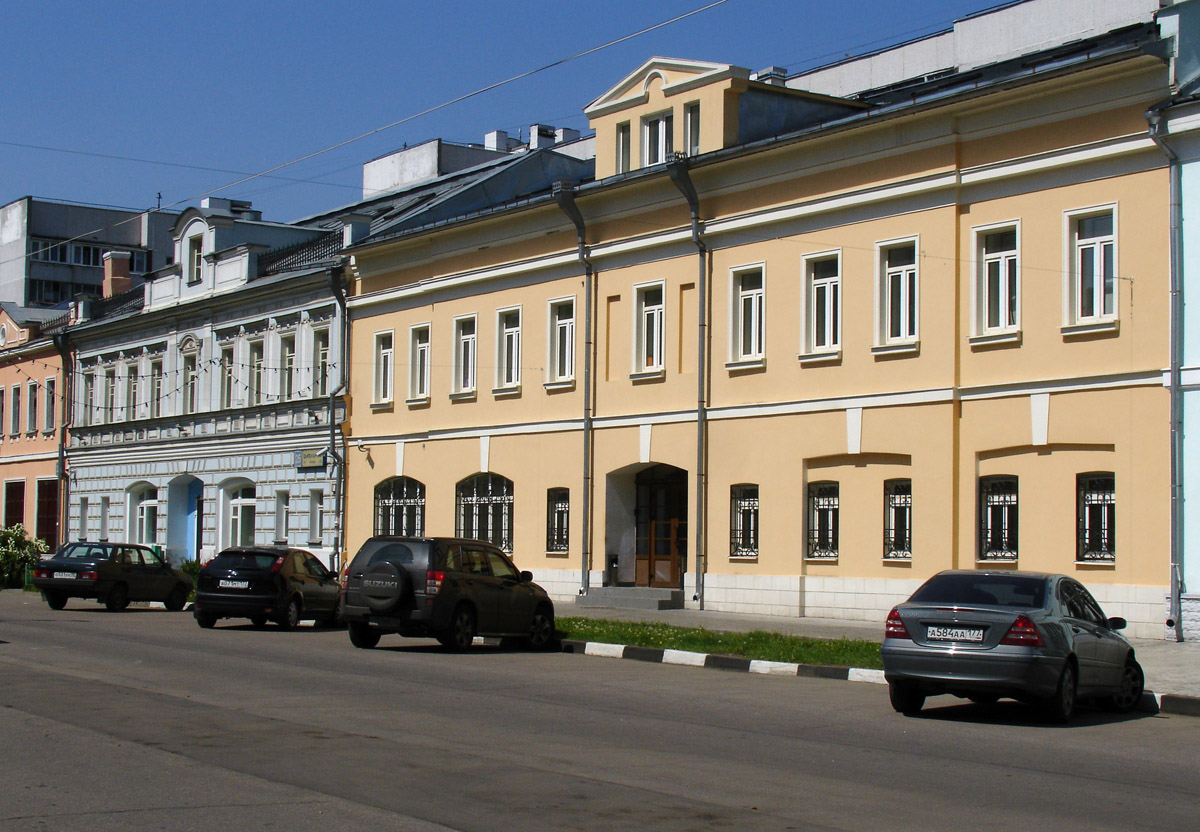

== Sources ==
- Mikhail Ivanov (1999). Moskovsky Tramvay: Stranitsy Istorii (Московский Трамвай: Страницы Истории) (in Russian). GK Mosgortrans.
- Lev Kolodny (2007). Taganka (in Russian). Golos Press. ISBN 978-5-7117-0176-7.
