= Dubki horse-iron road =

Russian: Конная железная дорога Сестрорецкого завода
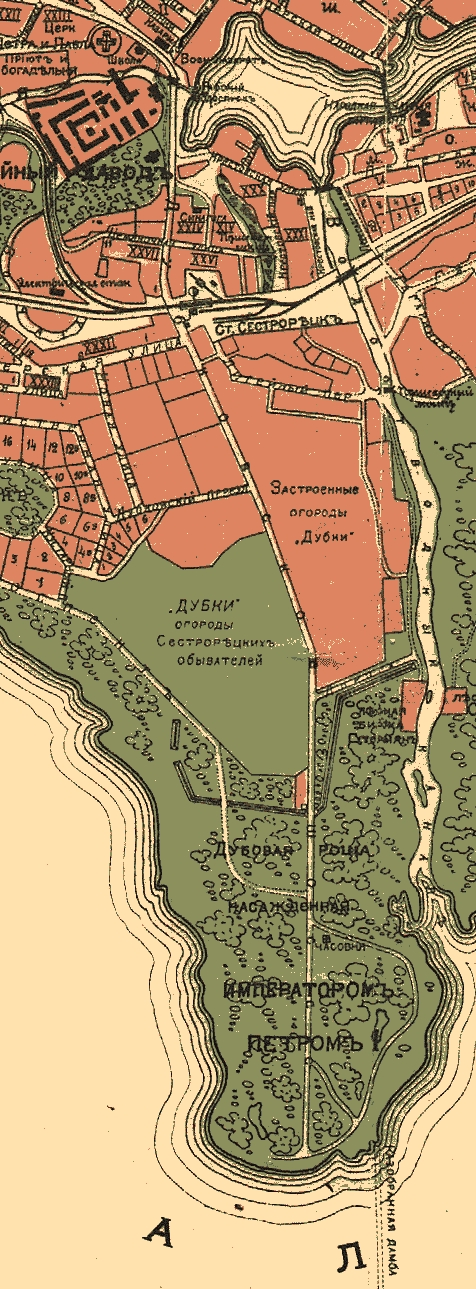
- The train runs along a designated street. In the south is the pier, in the north the factory.

Overview
- Headquarters: Sestroretsk
- Locale: Sestroretsk, Russia
- Dates of operation: 1843–before 1871
- Successor: Finnish railways

Technical
- Length: 2.5 km

The Dubki horse-iron road was built to serve the armory at Sestroretsk, Russia. The production of the Sestroretsk armory was originally transported to Saint Petersburg along the coast, by road. But the road to the capital existing at that time was inconvenient, since it lay along the coast on quicksands and lowlands, which were periodically submerged by the waters of the Gulf of Finland. Therefore, seagoing scows (barges) later began to be used. In 1847, a horse-drawn tramroad was built from the plant to the Dubkovsky pier on the Gulf of Finland. In the diagram this tramroad is not shown, but it passed along the axis of the street to the centre of the map. The opening and the location of the pier are designated on the map.
