= Pionerskaya metro station =

Pionerskaya metro station may refer to:

- Pionerskaya (Moscow Metro), a station of the Moscow Metro, Moscow, Russia
- Pionerskaya (Saint Petersburg Metro), a station of the Saint Petersburg Metro, Saint Petersburg, Russia
- Pionerskaya metrotram station, a metrotram station of Volgograd Metrotram, Volgograd, Russia

== See also ==
- Pionersky (disambiguation)
