= Shkolnoye =

Shkolnoye Школьное
- Selo
- Location within Republic of Dagestan Location within Russia
- Coordinates: 43°54′N 46°45′E
- Country: Russia
- Region: Republic of Dagestan
- District: Kizlyarsky District
- Time zone: UTC+3:00

Shkolnoye (Russian: Школьное) is a rural locality (a selo) in Kizlyarsky Selsoviet, Kizlyarsky District, Republic of Dagestan, Russia. The population was 734 as of 2010. There are 9 streets.

== Geography ==
It is located 8 km northeast of Kizlyar.

== Nationalities ==
Avars, Russians, Tsakhurs and Dargins live there.
