= Lisy Nos =

Municipal settlement in St. Petersburg, Russia

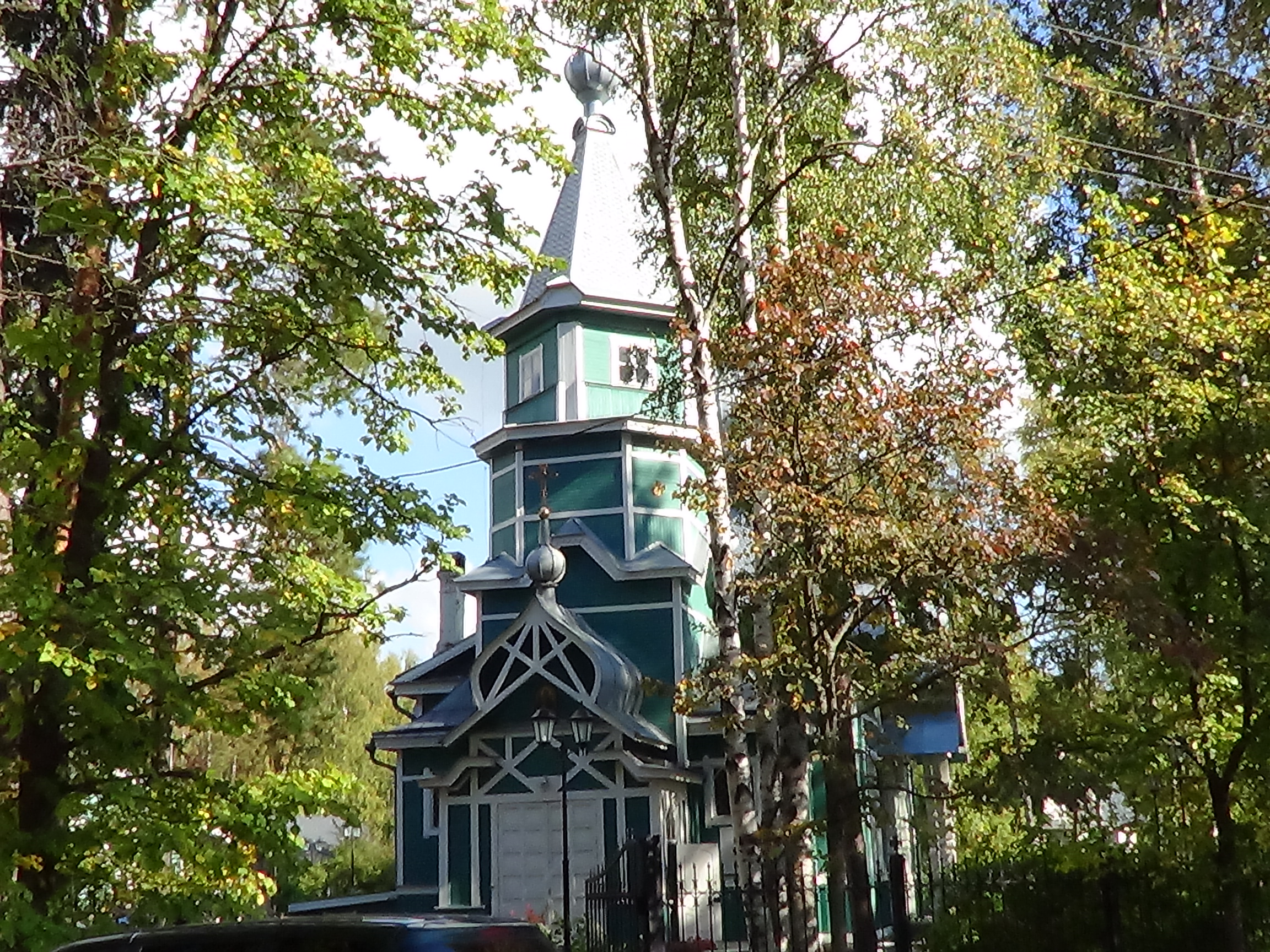
A wooden church in Lisy Nos

Lisy Nos (Russian: Ли́сий Нос; literally, "fox's nose"; Finnish: Revonnenä) is a municipal settlement in Primorsky District of the federal city of St. Petersburg, Russia, located on the cape of the same name in the northern part of the Kronstadt Bay. Population: 4,759 (2010 census); 2,563 (2002 census).

The settlement originated in the mid-19th century as a dacha village near a coastal fort, or redoubt, designed to defend St. Petersburg from the projected British raid during the Crimean War. The Primorsky Railway runs through the settlement. It is the site of the Lisiy Nos railway station. The Saint Petersburg Dam runs south from Lisy Nos toward Kotlin Island.
