= Pionerskaya railway station =

Railway station in St. Petersburg, Russia

Pionerskaya
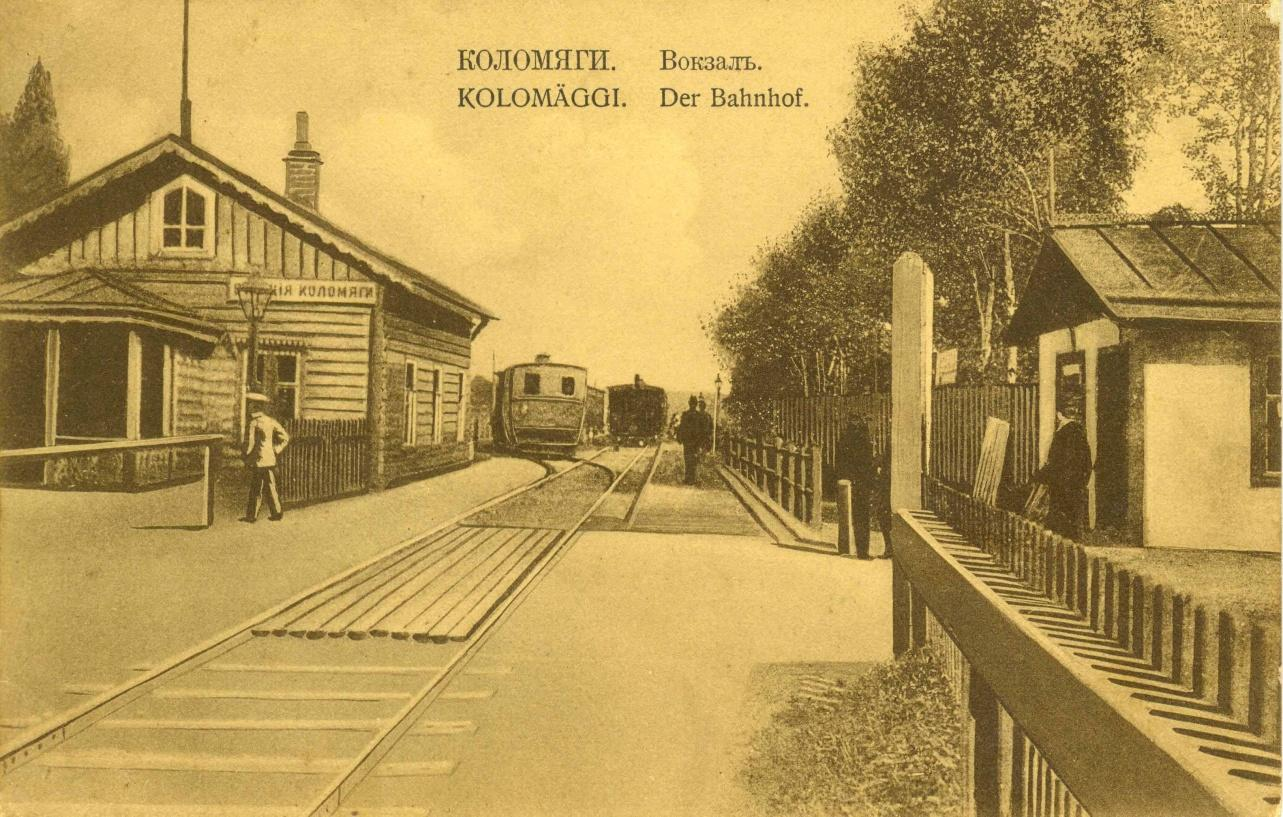
- Rail station in 1900s

General information
- Coordinates: 60°0′58″N 30°18′1″E
- System: Closed commuter service passenger station
- Line: Small October railway
- Platforms: 1
- Tracks: 2
- Connections: Historical Ozerki line

Construction
- Platform levels: low

History
- Opened: 1893
- Closed: 1927, 1990
- Rebuilt: 1948
Location

Pionerskaya rail station (Russian: Ста́нция Пионе́рская) is a railway station located in St. Petersburg, Russia.

It was constructed by the joint-stock company of the Prinorskaya St.-Peterburg-Sestroretsk railway and was opened with the Ozerki line on July 23, 1893.

In 1948 it was re-opened as a part of the narrow-gauge Malaya October Railway under the name the Zoopark. In 1969 it was renamed to Pionerskaya, and was closed in 1990.
