= Sestroretsk railway station =

Railway station in Sestroretsk, Russia

Coordinates: 60.0925°N 29.9578°E

Sestroretsk Сестрорецк
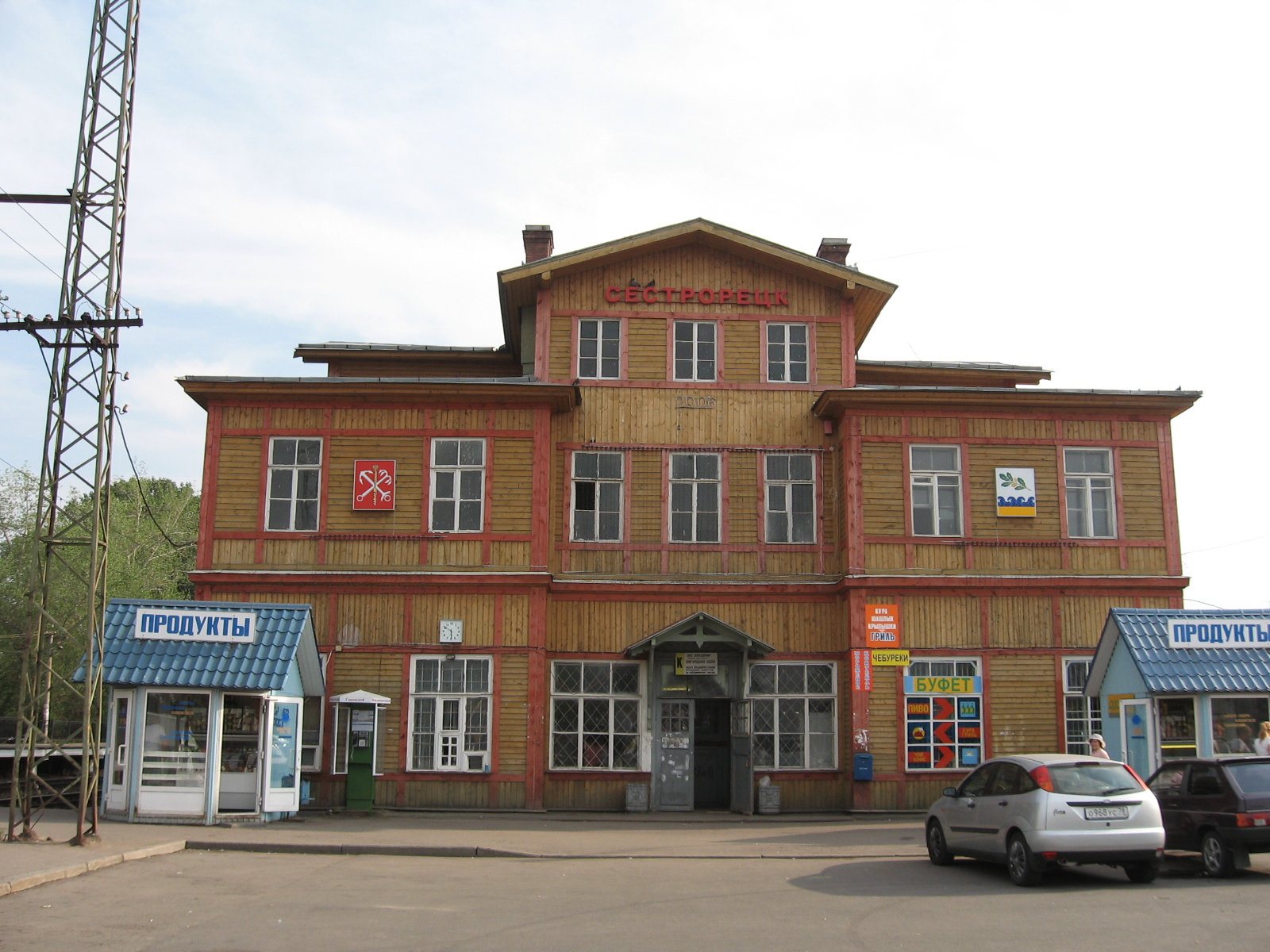
- Railway station in 2006

General information
- Platforms: 2, lateral
- Tracks: 2

Construction
- Structure type: At-grade

History
- Electrified: 1952

Services
Preceding station	Primorskaya Railway	Following station
Yermolovskaya towards Dyuny	Primorskaya Line	Tarkhovka towards Primorsky
Location

Sestroretsk railway station (Russian: ста́нция Сестроре́цк, stantsiya Sestroretsk) is a railway station in Sestroretsk, Russia. It replaced the old Sestroretsk railway station, which closed in 1924.

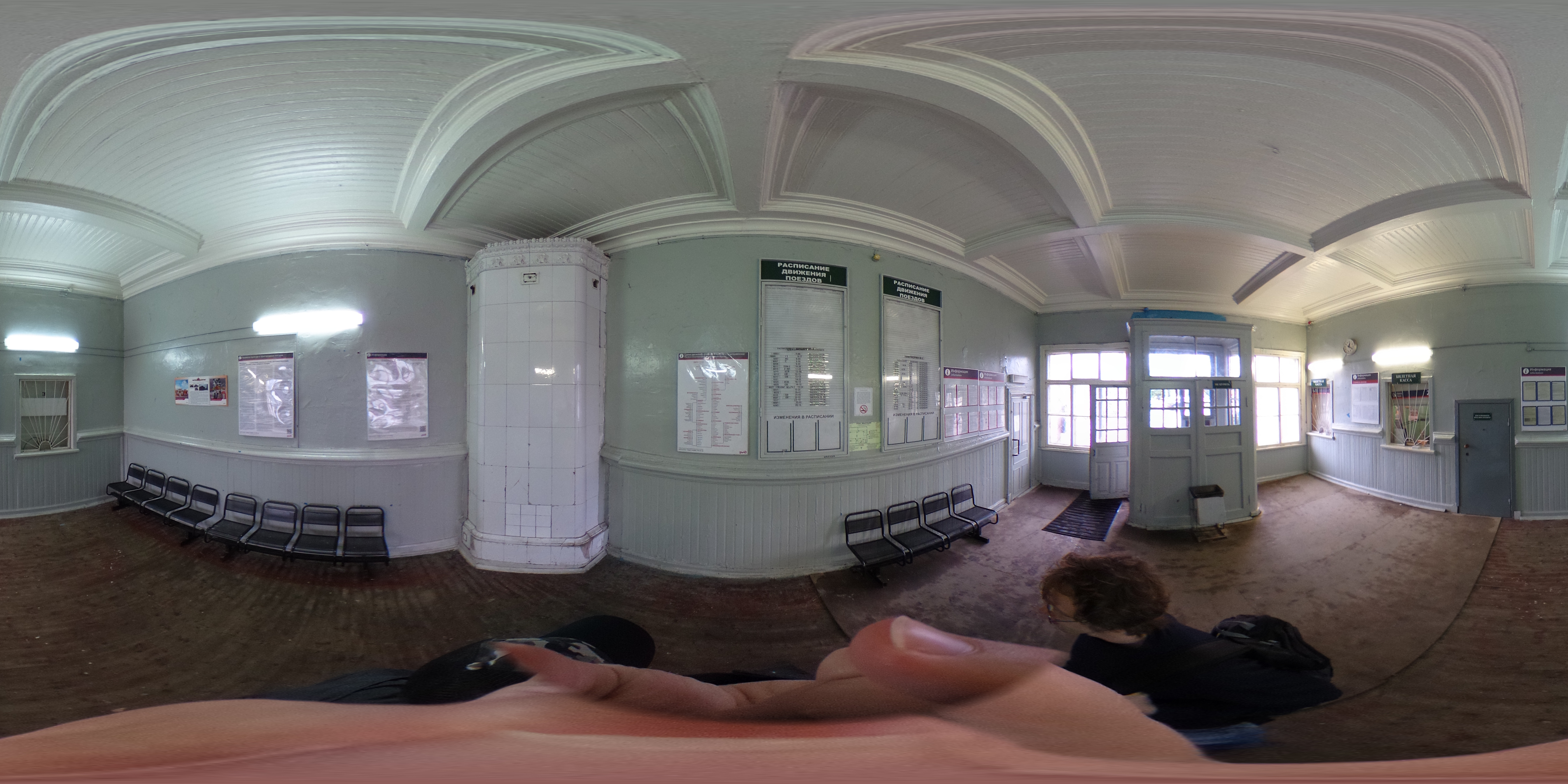
Interior of station building with ceramic tiled stove (view as a 360° interactive panorama)
