= Malaya October Railway =

The Malaya Oktyabrskaya Railway or Malaya October Railway (Russian: Малая Октябрьская железная дорога), which forms a part of RZD, is a railway where children can learn and train for the professions related to railways.

== Description ==
The north path was open on 27 August 1948 and still in operation. The construction of the south path was started in 2007 and finished in 2011. The south path starts near the metro Kupchino and goes to Pushkin.

== In the movies ==
The movie The Adventures of Sherlock Holmes and Dr. Watson was partly filmed on this railroad.
