= Dyuny railway station =

Railway station in Saint Petersburg, Russia

Dyuny Дюны
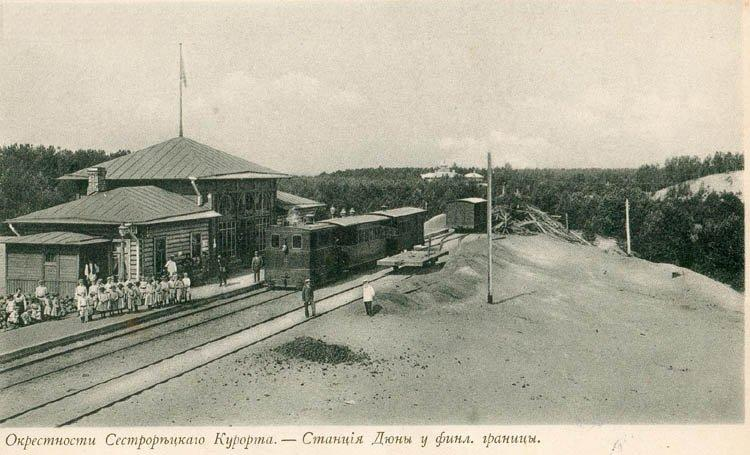
- Dune railway station in 1900s

General information
- System: Commuter service passenger station
- Line: Historical Primorskaya line
- Platforms: 1 side
- Tracks: 2

Construction
- Platform levels: Low

Services
Preceding station	Primorskaya Railway	Following station
Terminus	Primorskaya Line	Shkolnaya towards Primorsky
Location

Dyuny railway station (Russian: Ста́нция Дю́ны) is a former railway station located near Sestroretsk (a suburb of Saint Petersburg), Russia, and functioned in the first two decades of the 20th century.

It was built by the Joint-stock company of the Primorskaya St.-Petersburg-Sestroretsk railway. Dyuny was the terminus of the short branch (completely demolished up to now) started in the still existing Kurort station.
