= Beloostrov railway station =

Railway station in St. Petersburg, Russia

Beloostrov Белоостров
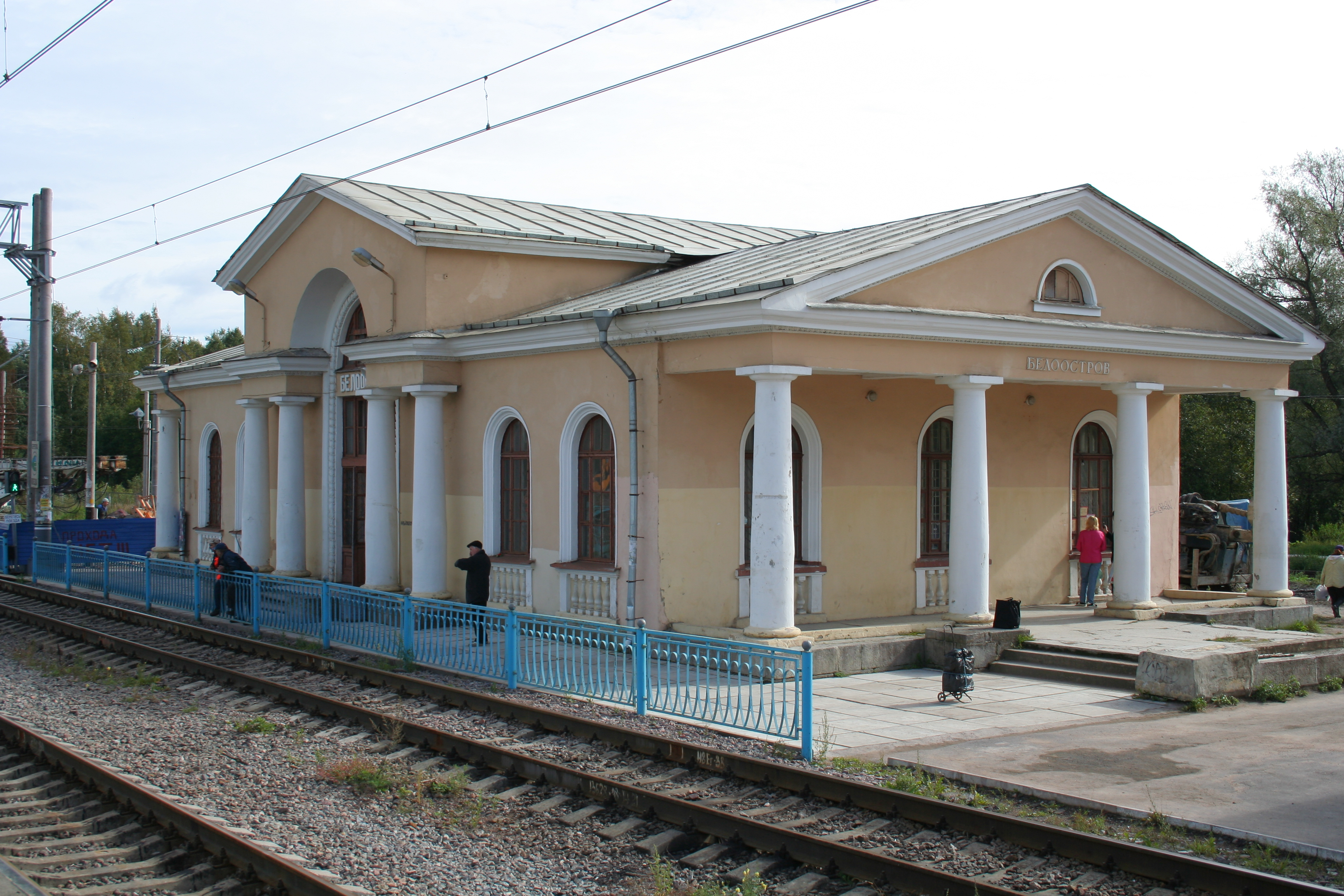

General information
- Location: Beloostrov, Kurortny District; Saint Petersburg; Russia
- Coordinates: 60°08′39″N 30°00′53″E
- Owner: Russian Railways
- Operator: October Railway
- Line: Saint Petersburg Railway Division
- Platforms: 3
- Tracks: 8

Construction
- Structure type: At-grade
- Accessible: Yes

Other information
- Station code: 039208
- Fare zone: 4

History
- Opened: 1869
- Rebuilt: 1954

Services
| Preceding station | Russian Railways | Following station |
|---|---|---|
| Solnechnoye towards Riihimäki | Riihimäki–Saint Petersburg | Dibuny towards Saint Petersburg–Finlyandsky |
| Terminus | Saint Petersburg–Beloostrov | Sestroretsk towards Saint Petersburg–Finlyandsky |
Location

Beloostrov railway station (Russian: Белоостров железнодорожная станция) is a railway station of the Riihimäki–Saint Petersburg railway in Beloostrov located at the border between St. Petersburg and Leningrad Oblast in Russia. The station is also a rail junction of the bypass route with a same direction to Finland Station through Sestroretsk.

== History ==
The station was opened in 1869 and was built with a wooden station. The spurline to Sestroretsk was opened on 2 November 1871, requested by the Russian Ministry of Defence for communication of the Sestroretsk armory. The original station was destroyed during the Great Patriotic War and it was rebuilt in 1954 with the current structure. In 2015, the platforms were renovated to give a way for high-speed train service that runs between St. Petersburg and Helsinki named "Allegro".

== Trains and destinations ==
| Federal subject(s) | Destinations | Operator(s) | Ref. |
|---|---|---|---|
| Leningrad Oblast | Gavrilovo | Russian Railways | |
| Leningrad Oblast | Vyborg | Russian Railways | |
| Leningrad Oblast | Pobeda | Russian Railways | |
| Leningrad Oblast | Kirillovskoye | Russian Railways | |
| Leningrad Oblast | Roshchino | Russian Railways | |
| Saint Petersburg | Saint Petersburg | Russian Railways | |
| Saint Petersburg | Zelenogorsk | Russian Railways | |
