= Primorskaya Line =

Railway line in Russia

Primorskaya line Russian: Приморская линия
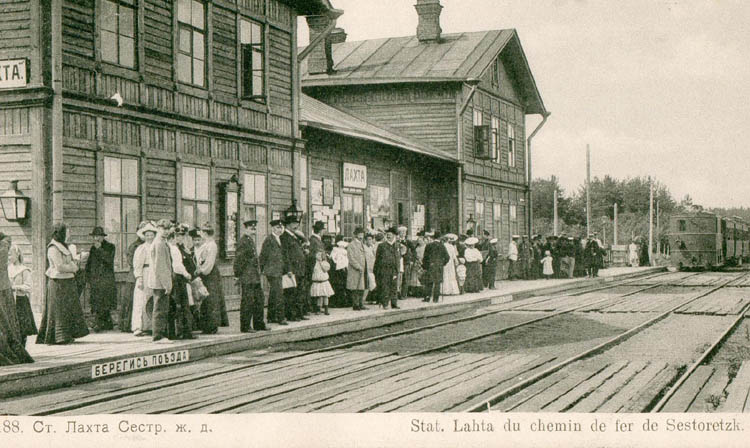
- Line first stage - terminal station "Lahta"

Overview
- Status: Local
- Locale: St. Petersburg, Russia
- Termini: Primorsky Rail Terminal, Primorsky - goods, from 1924 - Novaya Derevnya; after 1894 - Lakhta
- Stations: 5

Service
- Type: Heavy rail
- System: Commuter cargo and passenger railroad
- Services: Primorsky Rail Terminal - Lakhta, from 1924 - Novaya Derevnya - Ozerki

History
- Opened: 1894
- Closed: 1924

Technical
- Line length: 35.1 km (21.81 mi)
- Track gauge: 1,524 mm (5 ft)

The Primorskaya line was the second line constructed by the Primorskaya railway, near St. Petersburg, Russia. It is now part of the Oktyabrskaya Railway and was electrified in 1952.

== History ==
Its first stage was opened on July 12, 1894 - the line reached Lakhta. Second stage was opened on October 31, 1894; the railway left on coast of Gulf of Finland opposite to island Kotlin and was integrated with a steamship line. Later, November 26, the same year, the third turn of a railroad line was opened. The line reached a final point - the cities of Sestroretsk

Stages of Primorskaya line
#	Opened	Stations
1	July 12, 1894	Novaya derevnya - Shunting loop 2 verst - Shunting loop Dum - Lakhta
2	October 31, 1894	Lakhta - Razdelnaya; Razdelnaya - Lisy Nos
3	November 26, 1894	Lakhta - Kaupilovo - Gorskaya - Sestroretsk

== Route ==
Only major stations are shown.

- Primorsky, 0 km
- Lakhta, 17.1 km
- Lisy Nos, 20.3 km
- Kaupilovo, 22.1 km
- Gorskaya, 24.0 km
- Tarkhovka, 26.5 km
- Sestroretsk, 35.1 km

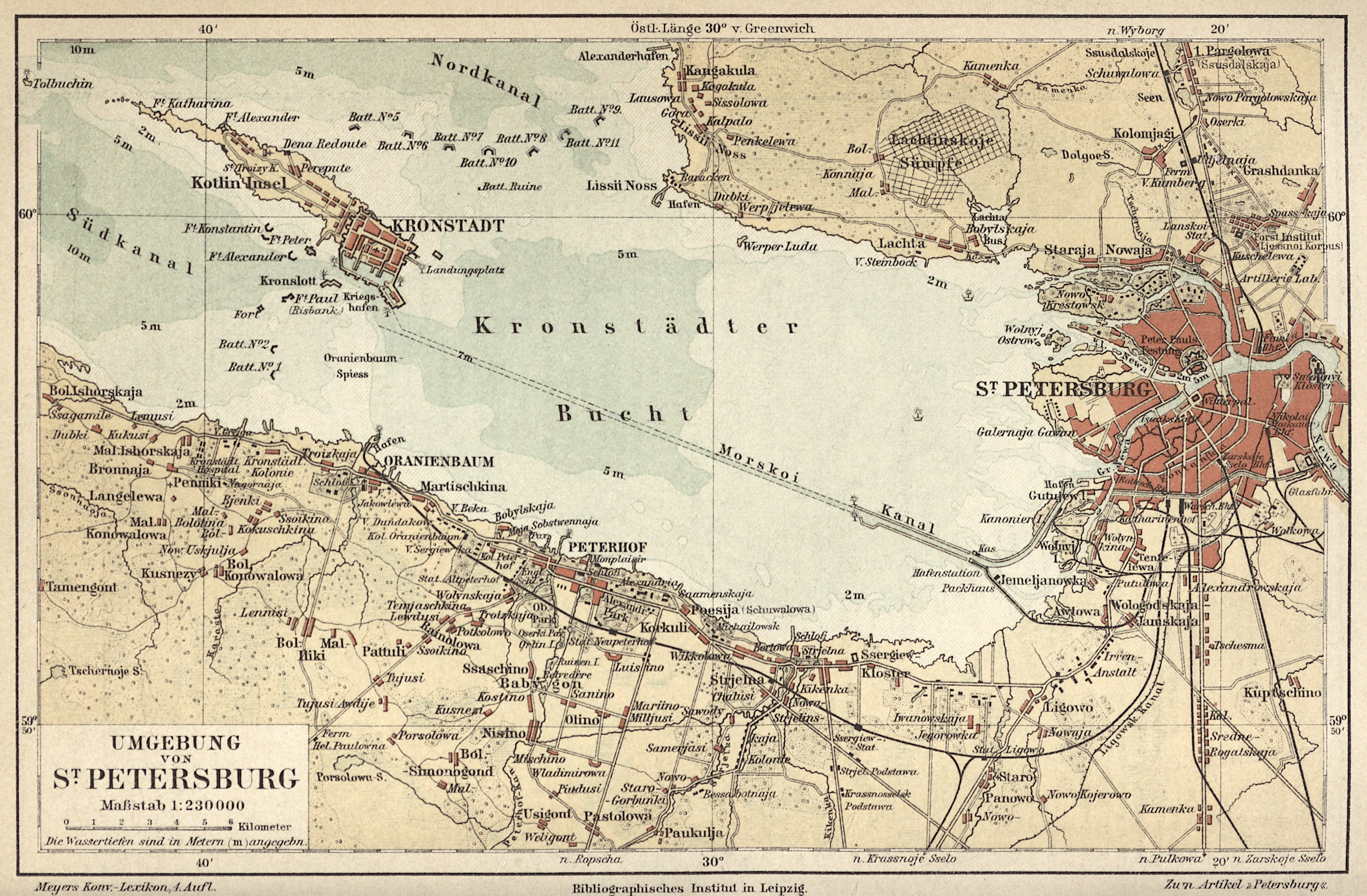
1890 map of Neva Bay. Kotlin end Lisy Nos is depicted in the upper left corner

== See also ==
- Connecting Line
