= Primorsky railway station =

Railway station in Russia

Primorsky Приморский
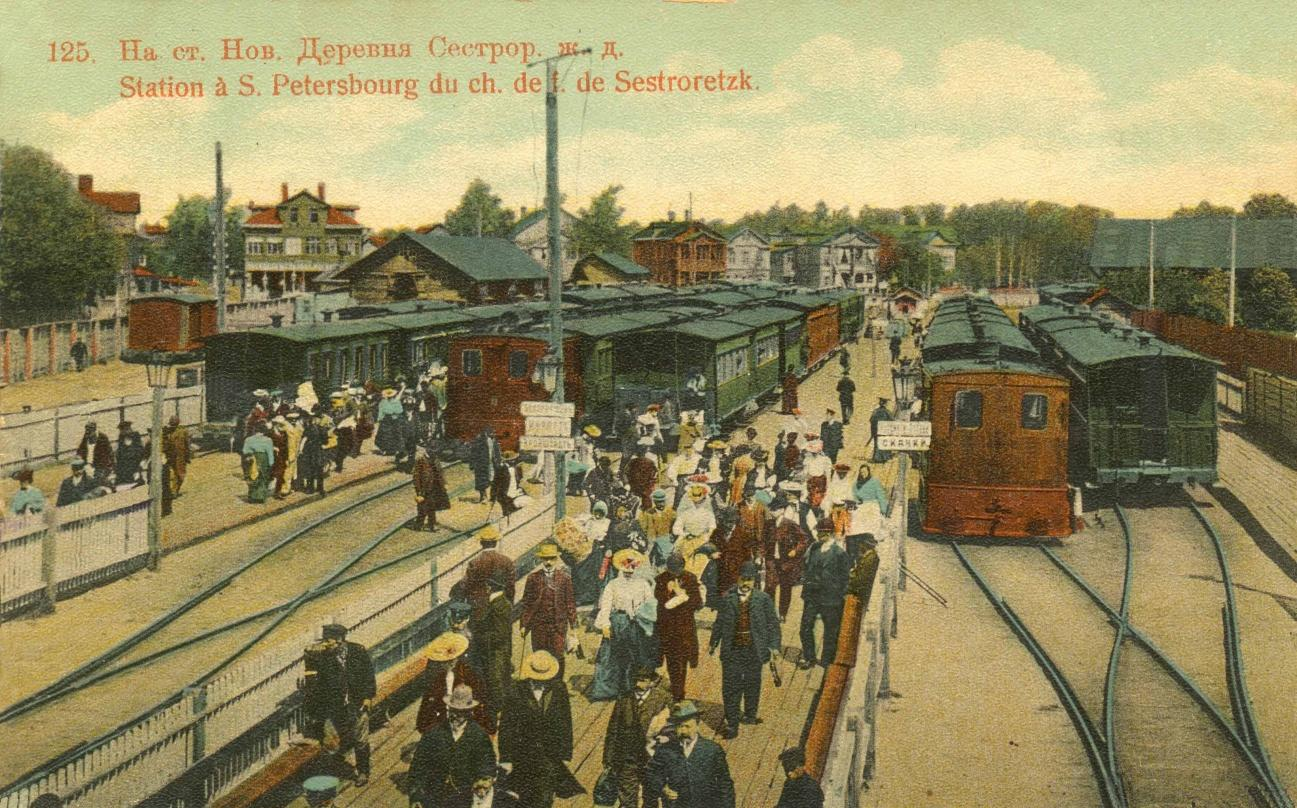
- Primorsky station in 1900s (decade)

General information
- Coordinates: 59°59′04″N 30°17′36″E
- Platforms: 3 (2 island, 1 side)
- Tracks: 3

Construction
- Structure type: At-grade
- Platform levels: Low

Other information
- Status: Defunct

History
- Opened: 23 July 1893
- Closed: 23 September 1924

Services
Preceding station	Primorskaya Railway	Following station
Lakhta towards Dyuny	Primorskaya Line	Terminus
Skachki towards Ozerki	Ozerki Line	Terminus
Terminus	Tovarnaya Line	Flyugov post towards Finlyandsky Rail Terminal
Location

Primorsky station (Russian: Примо́рский вокза́л) is a former railway terminal in St. Petersburg, Russia. It was constructed by the JSC Primorskaya Saint Peterburg–Sestroretsk railway and was opened on July, 23rd 1893 as part of the Ozerki Line.

The station was closed on 23 September 1924, during the catastrophic flooding and it was never restored. In 1925, the passenger traffic was redirected through the Tovarnaya Line to Finland Station, via Flugov post and Baburin post.
