= Primorskaya Railway =

Railway in Russia

Primorskaya railway was located near Saint Petersburg and it lay on the route Saint Petersburg, Sestroretsk, Beloostrov. The railway was served by steam locomotives from the moment of opening and before joining to Oktyabrskaya railway in 1925.

== Joint-stock company ==
Many articles refer to the "Joint-stock company of the Prinorskaya St.-Peterburg-Sestroretsk railway". It is not known whether the misspelling of Primorskaya actually appeared in the company's title. The title implies that the western terminus of the railway was intended to be Primorsk but it did not reach Primorsk within the lifetime of the company.

== Construction ==
The line was constructed in three parts:

- Ozerki line, opened 23 July 1893
- Primorskaya Line
  - first stage opened 12 July 1894
  - second stage opened 31 October 1894
  - third stage opened 26 November 1894
- Tovarnaya line, opened May 1904

The route of the line in the Saint Petersburg area is difficult to follow because various changes were made between 1894 and 1928. Of particular note was the closure of Primorsky Rail Terminal (due to flooding) in 1924 and the re-routing of trains to Finlyandsky Rail Terminal.

== Technical stops ==
For technical needs and for travel of trains technical stops were necessary.

Name	Opened	Closed	Number of track	Location	Coordinates	Line	Previous stop	Next stop	Image	In Russian
Serdobolskaya stop	1904	1929	2	60, Serdobolskaya street	59°59′19″N 30°19′1″E	Tovarnaya line	Primorsky Rail Terminal, Novaya derevnya	Flugov post	Map of line (ru)	Russian: Сердобольская
Primorsky - goods		1924?	2			Tovarnaya line		Serdobolskaya stop	Map of line (ru)	Russian: Приморский-товарный
Sestroretsk armory			2	2, Voskova street	60°5′55″N 29°57′57″E		Sestroretsk railway station		Map of line (ru)	Russian: Сестрорецкий завод
Sestroretsk armory, horse-iron road	1847	before 1870	2?	2, Voskova street	60°05′37″N 30°02′0″E	Dubki horse-iron road	Dubkovsky pier			Russian: Сестрорецкий завод
Shunting loop 2 verst; after the 1980s - Yakhtennaya	12 July 1894	1924	2	Near Primorsky prospect and Yakhtennaya street corner	59°59′30″N 30°03′16″E	Primorskaya line	Novaya Derevnya	Shunting loop Dum		Russian: Разъезд вторая верста

== Rolling stock ==
In the late 19th and early 20th centuries, steam tram engines were used, as shown below.

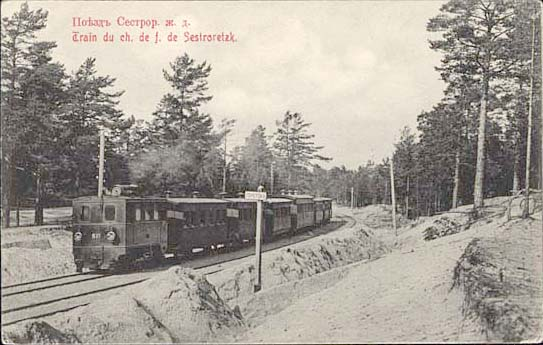
Train of the Seaside Sestroretsk railway, pre-1917

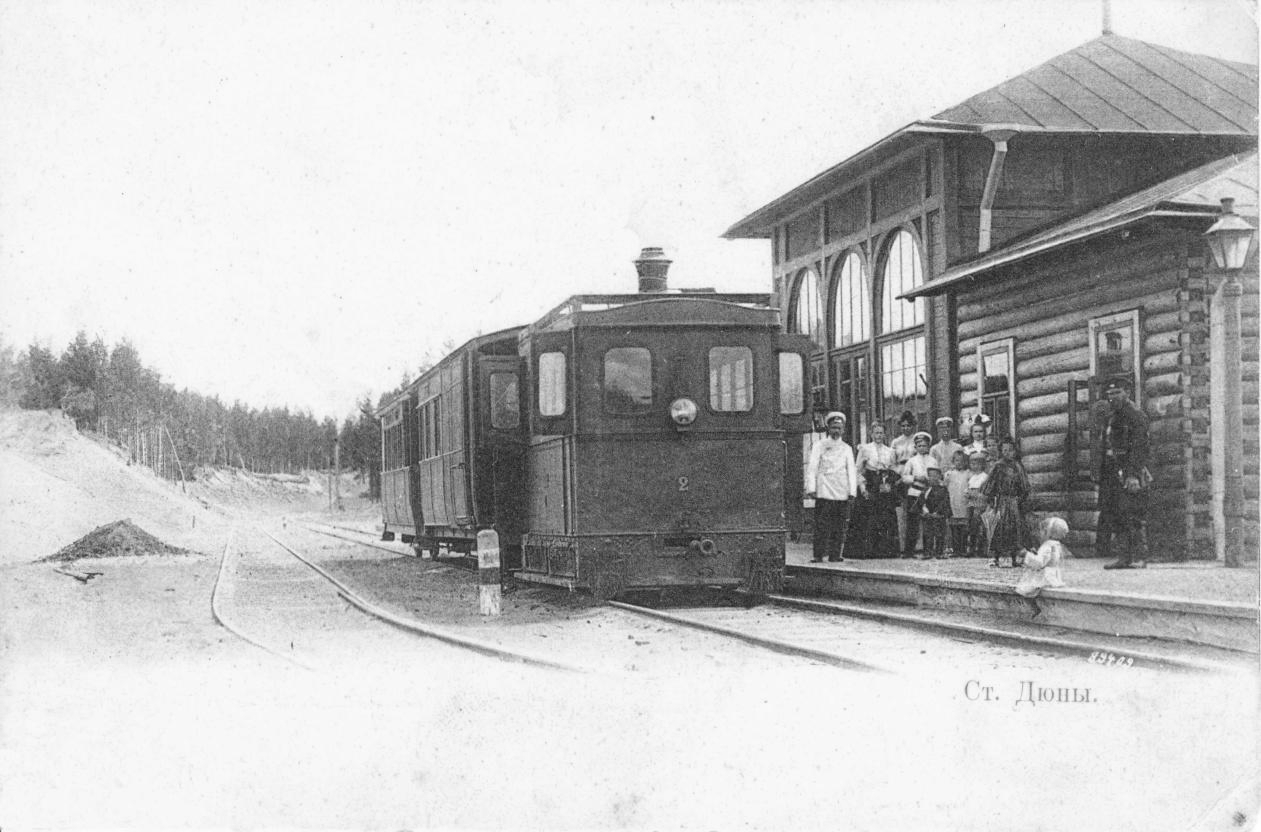
Train at Dyuny railway station, 1900s

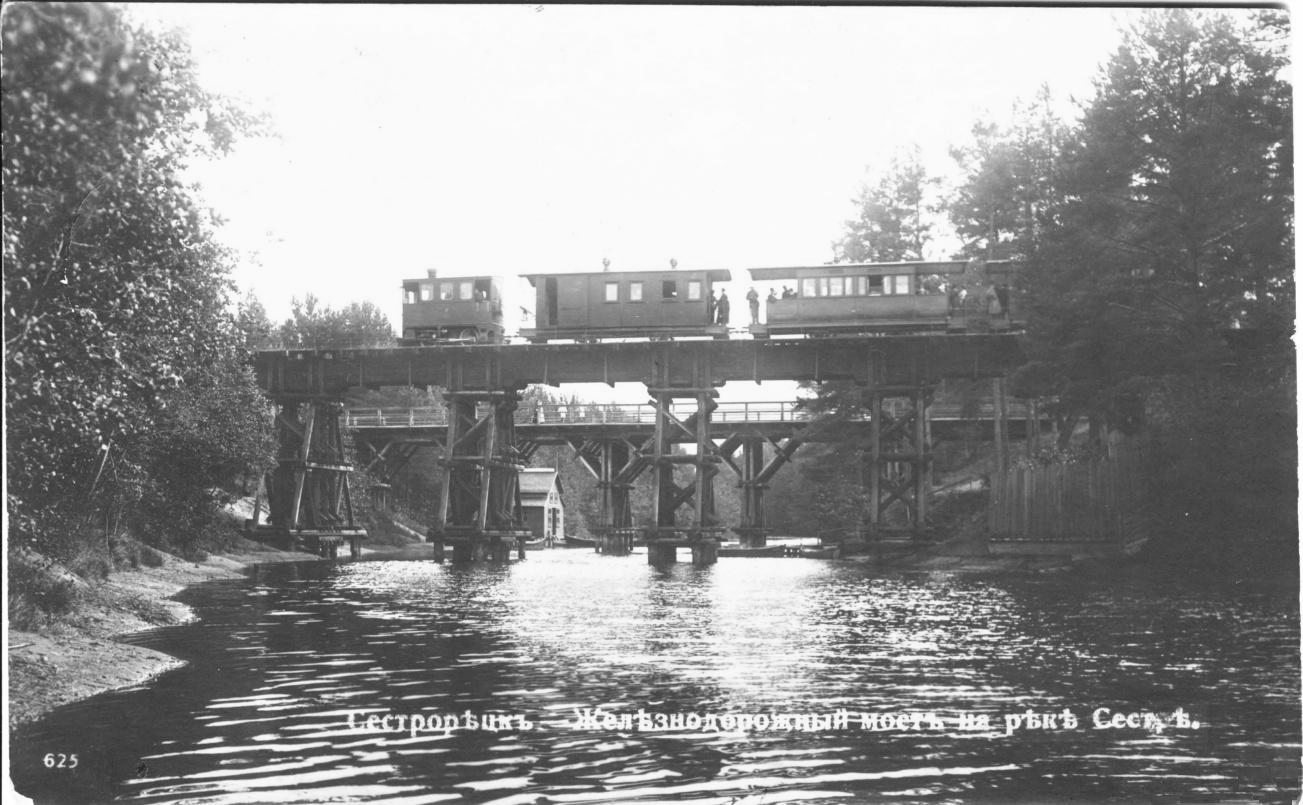
Train on Zavodskaya sestra crossover, 1900s

== People ==
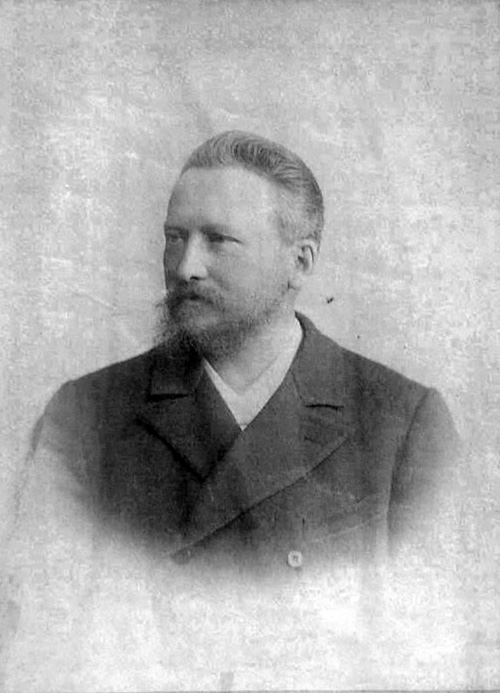
Pyotr Avenarius (1843-1909) engineer of the line
