= Finland Station =

Railway station in St. Petersburg, Russia

St. Petersburg–Finlyandsky Санкт-Петербург–Финляндский
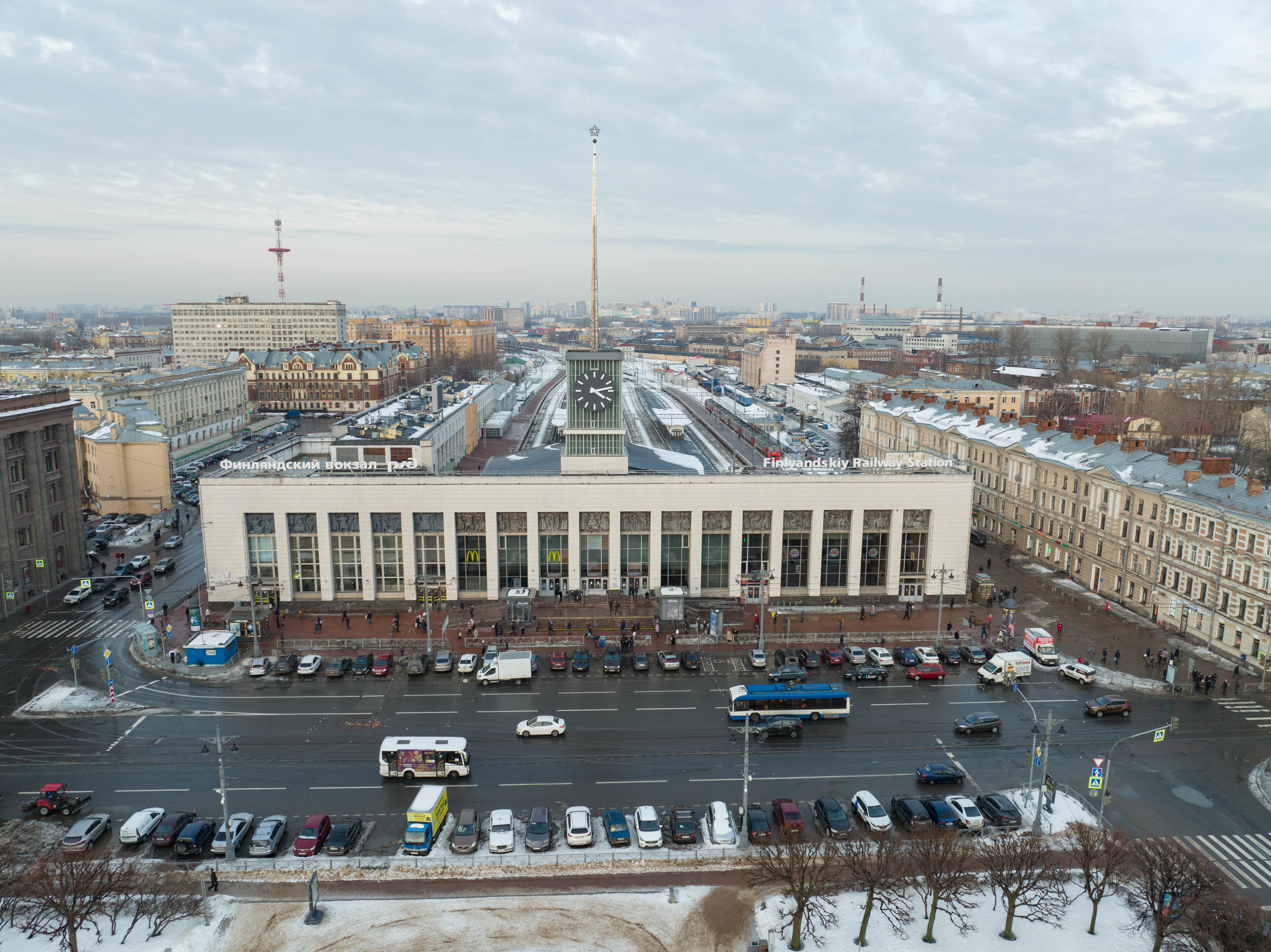
- St.Petersburg–Finlyandsky main building

General information
- Location: 5 Lenin Square, Saint Petersburg; Russia
- Coordinates: 59°57′20″N 30°21′24″E
- Owner: Russian Railways
- Operator: October Railway
- Line: Saint Petersburg Railway Division
- Platforms: 5 (island platforms)
- Tracks: 10
- Connections: Ploshchad Lenina

Construction
- Parking: Yes
- Architect: Pyotr Kupinsky

Other information
- Station code: 03820
- IATA code: FVS
- Fare zone: 0

History
- Opened: 1870
- Rebuilt: 1960
- Electrified: 1952
- Original company: Finnish State Railways (now VR Group)

Passengers
- 12 million p.a.

Services
Preceding station	Russian Railways	Following station
Lanskaya towards Riihimäki	Riihimäki–Saint Petersburg	Terminus
Lanskaya towards Beloostrov	Saint Petersburg–Beloostrov	Terminus
Kushelevka towards Khiytola	Saint Petersburg–Hiitola	Terminus
Location

St Petersburg–Finlyandsky (Russian: Станция Санкт-Петербург–Финля́ндский, romanized: Stantsiya Sankt-Peterburg–Finlyandskiy), also known as Finland Station (Russian: Финля́ндский вокзал, romanized: Finlyandskiy vokzal) (IATA: FVS), is a railway station in St. Petersburg, Russia, handling transport to westerly destinations including Helsinki and Vyborg.

The station is most famous for having been the location where Vladimir Lenin returned to Petrograd from exile in Switzerland on 16 April 1917 (N.S.), ahead of the October Revolution.

The main entrance to the metro station Ploshchad Lenina is in the main building of Finland Station.

== History ==
Finland Station was built by Finnish State Railways as the eastern terminus of the Riihimäki–Saint Petersburg railway. It was designed by Swedish architects and opened in 1870. The station formerly contained a special pavilion for Russian royalty.

The station was owned and operated by Finnish Railways until early 1918, when the last train, carrying station personnel and equipment, as well as some of the last Finns escaping revolutionary Russia, left for Finland. Later, ownership of the station was exchanged for Russian property in Finland, including the Alexander Theatre in Helsinki.

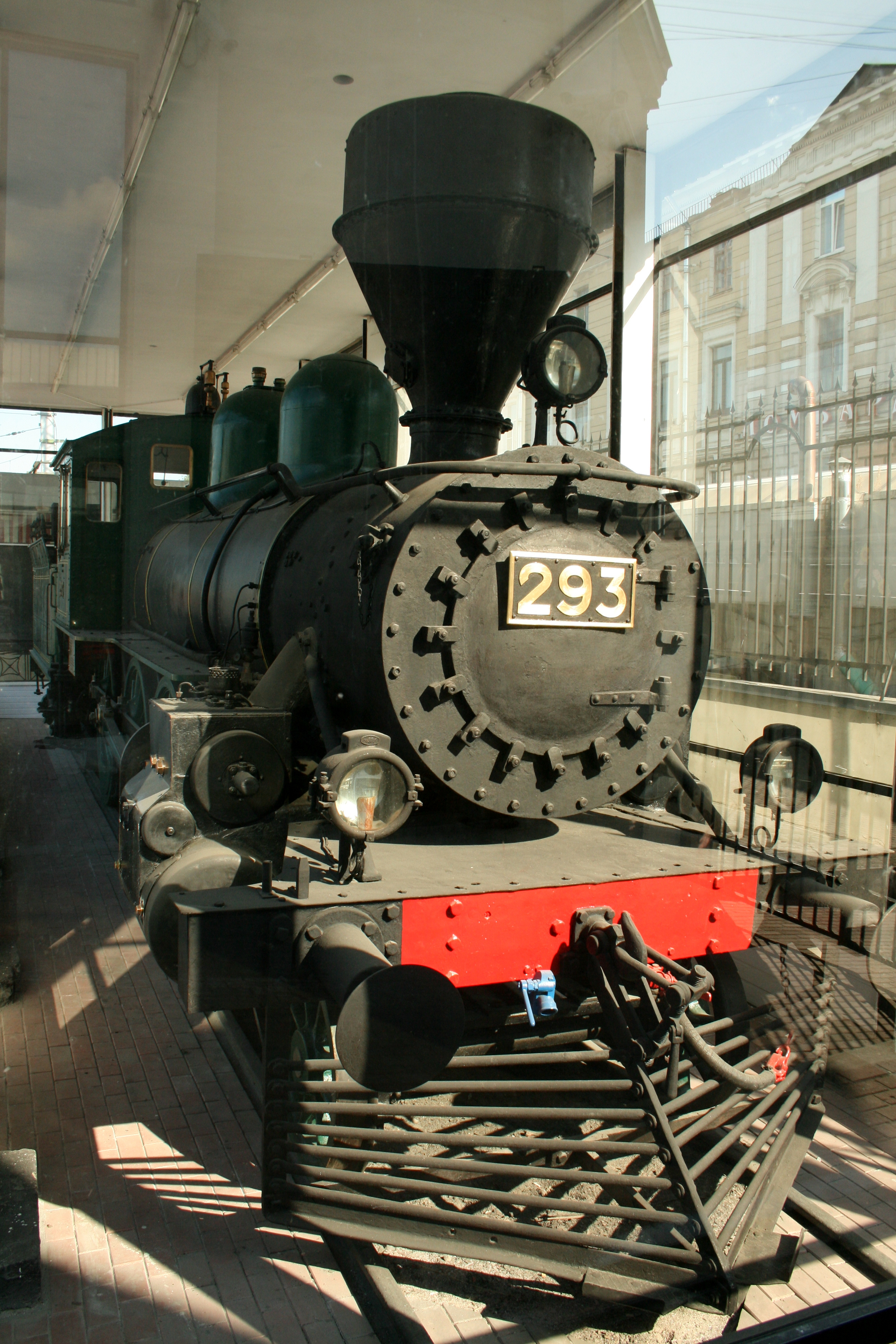
Hk1 293 at Finlyandsky station

The station is famously known for the arrival of Vladimir Lenin by train from Switzerland on 3 April 1917 (O.S.). The event is commemorated by the Soviet statue of Lenin dominating the square in front of the station. This event is also referred to in the title of Edmund Wilson's book To the Finland Station (1940), a well-known study of revolutionary thought.

After the turmoil of the July Days, when workers and soldiers in the capital clashed with government troops, Lenin had to flee to Finland for safety, to avoid arrest. Lenin secretly returned from Finland disguised as a railway worker and protected by Eino Rahja and Alexander Shotman on 9 August 1917. Both times Lenin crossed the Russian–Finnish border on engine #293 driven by Finnish engineer Hugo Jalava. This locomotive was later donated by Finland to the Soviet Union in 1957 and is now installed as a permanent exhibit at one of the platforms on the station.

During the siege of Leningrad in 1941–43, the Finland station was the only Leningrad rail terminus that remained in use. The railway would connect Leningrad with a station near the western shore of Lake Ladoga, at which supplies from the non-occupied parts of the Soviet Union would arrive from across the lake, by boat or over the lake ice, via the so-called Road of Life.

In the 1950s, the old station building was demolished and replaced with a new one, inaugurated in 1960. The turreted building is decorated with sculptures glorifying the October Revolution and incorporates a portico preserved from the original 1870 edifice.

Before dawn on Wednesday 1 April 2009, a bomb exploded in the statue of Lenin, creating an 80–100 cm hole in the back of the statue.

== Trains and destinations ==
Country	Destinations
Russia	Vyborg, Sestroretsk, Zelenogorsk, Primorsk, Priozersk
Finland^{1}	Helsinki

^{1} — all trips to/from Finland are suspended, because of sanctions against Russia due to invasion of Ukraine.

== In popular culture ==
"West End Girls", a 1984 song by Pet Shop Boys, contains the lyric "From Lake Geneva to the Finland Station". The song's co-writer, Neil Tennant, has a well-known interest and background in history (subject of his degree), particularly that of Russia. This line refers to the train route taken by Vladimir Lenin when he was smuggled by the Germans to Russia during the First World War, a pivotal event in the Russian Revolution. Edmund Wilson's book To the Finland Station, which Tennant most likely had read, may have also influenced this song's line.

== See also ==
- Emperor railway station, Pushkin town
