= To the Finland Station =

1940 book by American literary critic Edmund Wilson

First edition (published by Harcourt, Brace)

To the Finland Station: A Study in the Writing and Acting of History is a book by American literary critic Edmund Wilson. Published in 1940, the work presents the history of revolutionary thought and the birth of socialism. It spans from the French Revolution, through the collaboration of Karl Marx and Friedrich Engels, to Vladimir Lenin's arrival (from exile in Switzerland) at the Finland Station in Petrograd in April 1917, an event often marked as critical to the October Revolution.

== Content ==
The book is divided into three sections. The first section devotes five of eight chapters to Jules Michelet, and then discusses the "Decline of Revolutionary Tradition", referencing Ernest Renan, Hippolyte Taine, and Anatole France.

The second section covers Socialism and Communism in sixteen chapters. The first four describe the "Origins of Socialism" vis-à-vis Babeuf, Saint-Simon, Fourier, Owen, and Enfantin as well as the "American Socialists" Margaret Sanger and Horace Greeley. The next twelve chapters deal mostly with Karl Marx: the development of his thought in light of his influences, his partnership with Friedrich Engels, and the opposition they encountered from Lassalle and Bakunin.

The third section consists of six chapters: four on Lenin, and two on Trotsky. Important writings addressed include Lenin's "What Is to Be Done?" and Trotsky's Literature and Revolution, My Life, biography of Lenin, and The History of the Russian Revolution.

The book also mentions Eleanor Marx, Nadezhda Krupskaya, Annie Besant, Charles Bradlaugh and Georgy Gapon.

== Publication history ==
External videos
- Presentation on the life and work of Edmund Wilson with Louis Menand, April 28, 2003, C-SPAN

Harcourt, Brace & Co. published To the Finland Station in September 1940. Doubleday's Anchor Books imprint brought out a paperback edition in 1953. In 1972, the last year of Wilson's life, Farrar, Straus & Giroux published a new edition with an introduction by Wilson, in which he reassessed his interpretation of Soviet Communism:

This book of mine assumes throughout that an important step in progress has been made, that a fundamental "breakthrough" had occurred, that nothing in our human history would ever be the same again. I had no premonition that the Soviet Union was to become one of the most hideous tyrannies that the world had ever known, and Stalin the most cruel and unscrupulous of the merciless Russian tsars. This book should therefore be read as a basically reliable account of what the revolutionists thought they were doing in the interests of "a better world."

The New York Review of Books published a new edition in 2003, with a foreword by Louis Menand.

To the Finland Station was the first title issued by major Brazilian publisher Companhia das Letras when it was founded in 1986. The Portuguese translation of Wilson's work proved surprisingly successful.

== Reception ==
According to Louis Menand, To the Finland Station was published at a disadvantageous time "for a book whose hero is Vladimir Lenin". Trotsky had just been assassinated by a Soviet agent in Mexico, the Soviet Union and Nazi Germany had recently divided Poland according to the Molotov–Ribbentrop Pact, and many Western intellectuals had become disillusioned with Communism. By January 1947, the book had sold only 4,527 copies, but it gained readers after the 1953 paperback edition, and it continued to enjoy brisk sales in the 1960s.

In 1940, a reviewer writing for Time said:

Because it makes Marxist theory, aims and tactics intelligible to any literate non-Marxist mind, To the Finland Station is an invaluable book. It is an advantage that, like Milton with the character of Satan, Author Wilson is half in love with the human side of the curious specimens he describes.

Novelist Vladimir Nabokov, then Wilson's friend and collaborator, wrote to Wilson in December 1940 that the book is "beautifully composed" and "so entertaining" and that the author is "extraordinary unbiased although here and there I did notice two or three thistles of conventional radicalism sticking to your freely flowing gown." Nabokov criticized some parts of the book, particularly the depiction of Lenin, which, in Nabokov's view, "faithfully and fatally followed" the official communist biographies. Wilson acknowledged in the introduction to the 1972 edition that criticism of his Lenin portrayal as being too positive "has been made not without some justification", but he claimed that at the time he had very little source material to rely on besides the official accounts. Louis Menand later disputed Wilson's claim by pointing out that Mark Landau-Aldanov's Lenin biography had already been published in an English translation in 1922.

In his review of the 1972 edition, Marxist philosopher Marshall Berman calls the book "the last great 19th-century novel" and writes that it is "far more original and more powerful than its first generation of readers could have known." He praises the work's enormous scope and how it "interweaves philosophy, sociology, psychobiography, literary criticism, economic analysis, political history and theory, always in complex and sophisticated ways—and yet, for all this, the human narrative hardly ever flags, but sweeps us breathlessly along." Berman also lauds Wilson's depiction of historical figures, calling his characterization of Marx "brilliant and probably unsurpassable, almost Shakespearean in its tragic grandeur and anguish." He writes, "'To the Finland Station,' a work of the historical imagination at its most creative, puts us in touch with the revolutionary dreams and visions of our past. If we read it well, we can use it to teach ourselves how to keep the dreams alive in the present, and maybe even, in the future, how to make the visions real."

Menand labels To the Finland Station "if not a great book, a grand book. It brings a vanished world to life." He says Wilson "was justified in arguing, in the introduction to the 1972 edition, that his book constituted 'a basically reliable account of what the revolutionists thought they were doing in the interests of a 'better world.'" Menand adds that the book has value as "a poignant artifact of the 1930s."

In his 2017 review, historian Andrew Hartman writes that To the Finland Station "is beautifully written, imaginatively constructed, sweeping in scope, and smart in many of its judgments—though it gets some important things wildly wrong" and describes the work as a "classic work of intellectual history." Hartman criticizes what he views as Wilson's improper understanding of the Hegelian and Marxist dialectic.
