= Locomotive H2 293 =

Preserved Finnish steam locomotive

Finnish State Railways 293
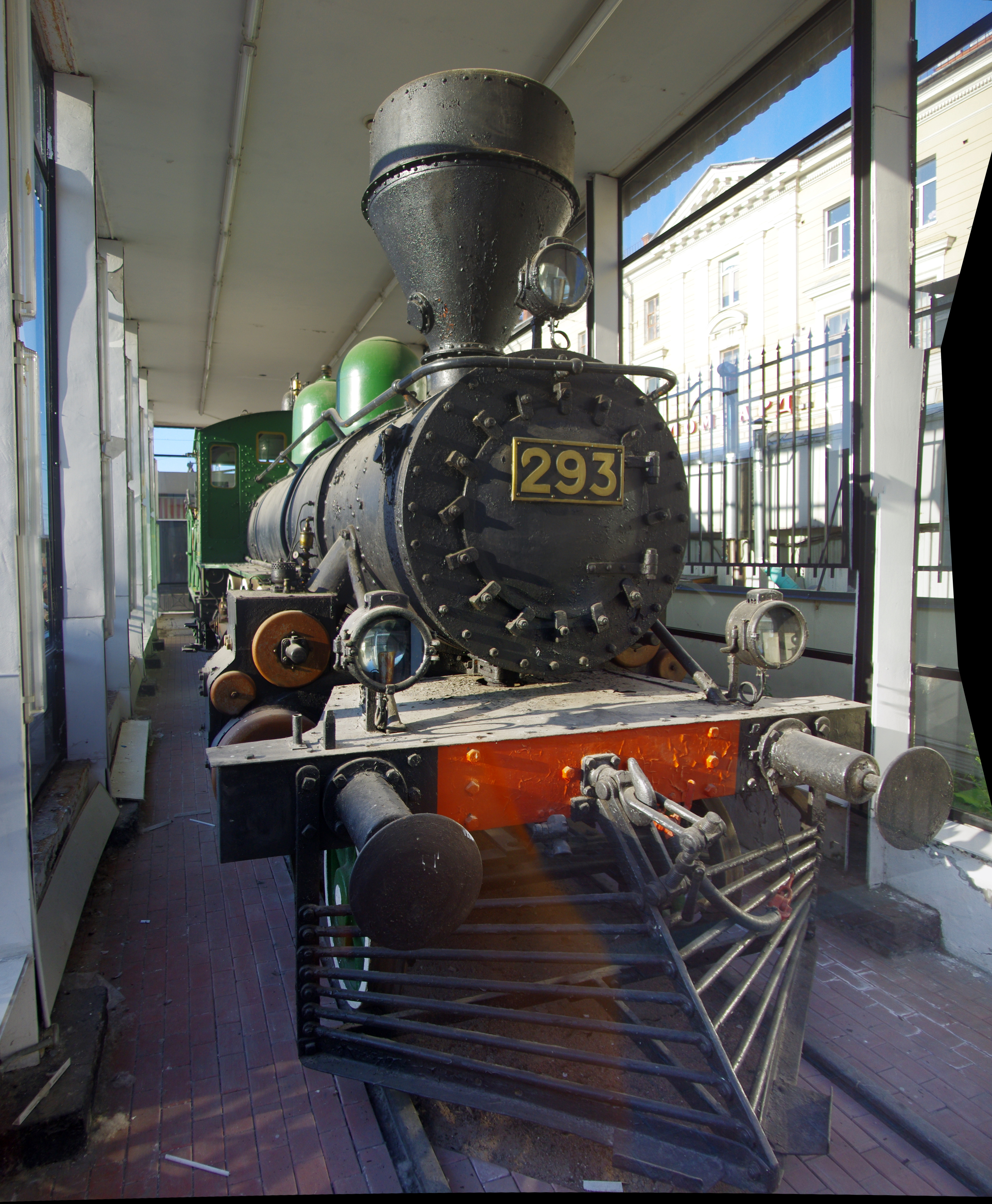
- Locomotive H2 293 4-6-0
Type and origin
- Power type: Steam
- Builder: Richmond Locomotive Works
- Serial number: 2991
- Build date: 1900
Specifications
- Configuration
  - Whyte: 4-6-0
- Gauge: 1,524 mm (5 ft)
Career
- Operators: Finnish State Railways
- Class: H2
- Numbers: 293
- Disposition: Static display at the Finland Station in Saint Petersburg.

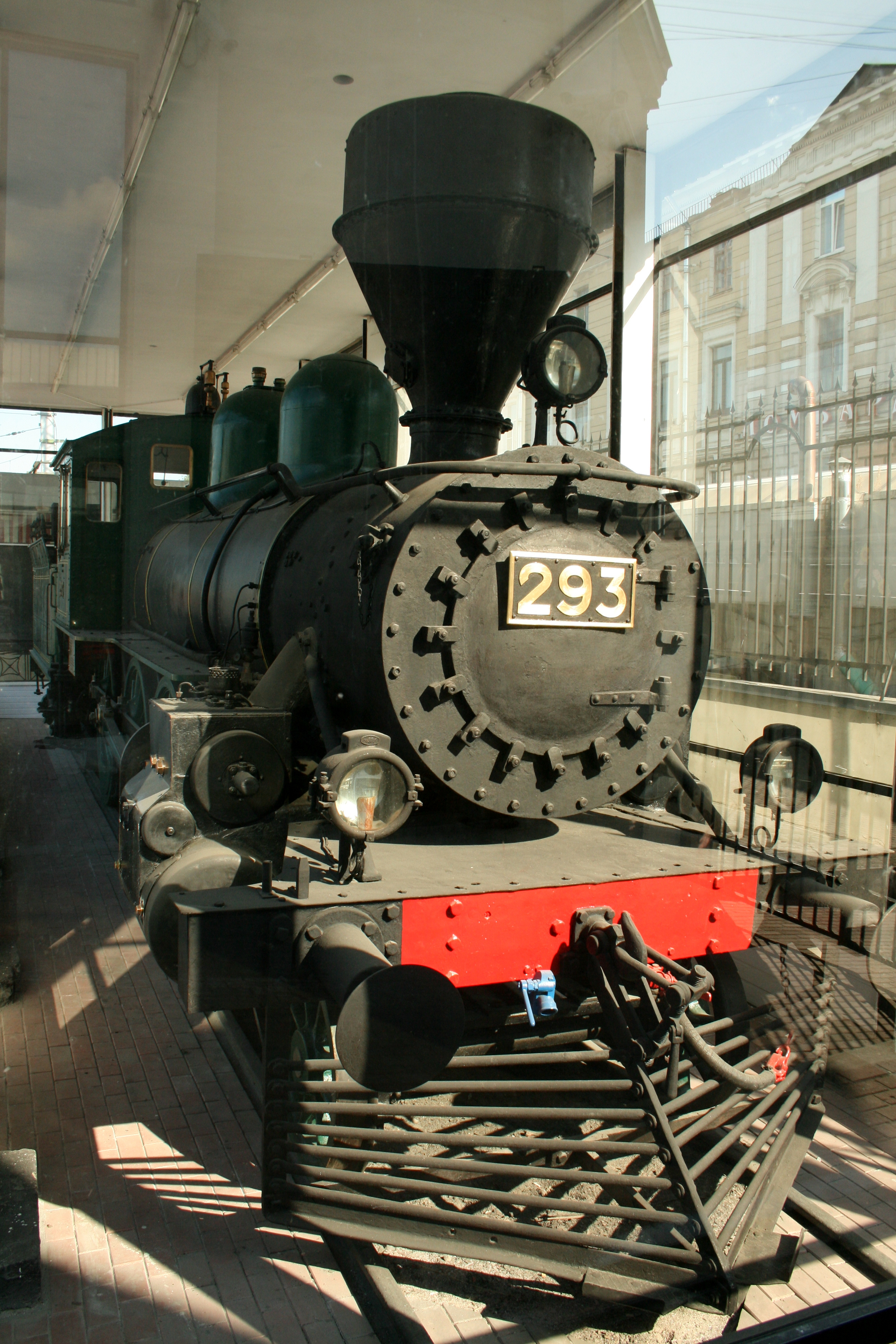
Memorial-locomotive at the Finland Station in St. Petersburg

The Finish locomotive H2 293 is a memorial-locomotive, displayed at the Finland Station in Saint Petersburg. It gained historical relevance when Vladimir Lenin fled Petrograd in 1917 while disguised as a stoker.

== History ==
The 2 C-Steam locomotive was manufactured for the Finnish State Railways as the H2 293.

Lenin arrived in Petrograd on April 16 [O.S. April 3] 1917 after travelling through Germany and Sweden on his return from Swiss exile in a sealed train.

Lenin had to flee Petrograd on the August 9 [O.S. July 27] 1917 after the provisional government under Alexander Kerensky put him up for arrest. He disguised himself as a stoker and drove past the border to Finland with train driver Hugo Jalava on the locomotive H2 293 in order to go into hiding. He returned to Petrograd using the same method on October 7 [O.S. September 24] 1917 hid in a working class district on the Vyborg Side where he then started the October Revolution, bringing down the Kerenski-Regime. The Locomotive H2 293 (known as Hk1 293 since 1942) continued operating until 1957 in service to the Finnish Railway(VR)

On June 13, 1957, the VR gifted the locomotive to the Soviet Union and was subsequently displayed behind glass at the Finland Station in Leningrad.
