= Axel's Castle =

1931 book by Edmund Wilson

Axel's Castle: A Study in the Imaginative Literature of 1870–1930
- Title page for Axel's Castle: A Study in the Imaginative Literature of 1870–1930 (1931)
- Author: Edmund Wilson
- Publication date: 1931

Axel's Castle: A Study in the Imaginative Literature of 1870–1930 is a 1931 book of literary criticism by Edmund Wilson on the Symbolist movement in literature.

== Contents ==
It includes a brief overview of the movement's origins and chapters on W. B. Yeats, Paul Valéry, T. S. Eliot, Marcel Proust, James Joyce and Gertrude Stein.

The appendices include Tristan Tzara's Memoirs of Dadaism and excerpts from Joyce's then-untitled forthcoming novel Finnegans Wake.

== Serialization ==
Some of the book's chapters were first serialized in The New Republic.

== Title ==
The book's title refers to Axël, a play by Auguste Villiers de l'Isle-Adam which is discussed along with the works of Arthur Rimbaud in the concluding chapter.
