= Helen Miranda Wilson =

American painter (born 1948)

- Born: February 19, 1948 (age 78)
- Father: Edmund Wilson

Helen Miranda Wilson (born February 19, 1948) is an American painter and the daughter of American writer and journalist Edmund Wilson. She attended Barnard College and the New York Studio School. Wilson created numerous landscapes before changing style to small abstract paintings.

Her work is in the collections of the Metropolitan Museum of Art, the Pennsylvania Academy of the Fine Arts, and the Weatherspoon Art Museum. She exhibited at the 177th Annual, National Academy of Design show.
