= Patriotic Gore =

Book by Edmund Wilson

Patriotic Gore: Studies in the Literature of the American Civil War
- First edition
- Author: Edmund Wilson
- Subject: Civil War and 19th century American historical and literary criticism
- Publisher: Oxford University Press
- Publication date: 1962
- Pages: 816pp.
- OCLC: 269476
- Dewey Decimal: 810.9
- LC Class: 62009834

Patriotic Gore: Studies in the Literature of the American Civil War is a 1962 book of historical and literary criticism written by Edmund Wilson. It consists of 16 chapters about the works and lives of almost 30 writers, including Ambrose Bierce, George Washington Cable, Mary Boykin Chesnut, Kate Chopin, John William De Forest (who, as American historian Henry Steele Commager put it, "surprisingly gets more space than any other writer, North or South"), Charlotte Forten, Ulysses Grant, Francis Grierson, Nathaniel Hawthorne, Hinton Rowan Helper, Oliver Wendell Holmes Jr., Henry James, Sidney Lanier, Abraham Lincoln, John S. Mosby, Frederick Law Olmsted, Thomas Nelson Page, Harriet Beecher Stowe, Albion W. Tourgée, John Townsend Trowbridge, Mark Twain, and Walt Whitman. In addition to De Forest, Wilson pays particular attention to Cable, Grant, Grierson, Holmes, and Stowe, choices considered "catholic and unexpected" at the time of its publication. The "patriotic gore" of the book's title was taken from Maryland's former (until 2021) pro-Confederate state song, "Maryland, My Maryland," "wrenched rather violently" from a line about the Baltimore riot of 1861. Commager described the book as a "series of reflections on [Civil War] literature and on the men and women, and the societies, that produced it"; he characterized it as "original, skeptical, allusive, penetrating. It is discursive, ranging widely from North to South, and even more widely in time." Most of the essays in the book originally appeared during the 1950s in The New Yorker.

== Reception ==
The critic R. W. B. Lewis observed that "the book does have a certain somber and durable magnificence. But for me it is damaged by Wilson's strenuous demythicizing of the war itself—his rejection as irrelevant of such matters as the fate of the Union and of the institution of slavery." Writing during the Cold War, Wilson viewed the Civil War through the lens of imperialism: "Having myself lived through a couple of world wars and having read a certain amount of history, I am no longer disposed to take very seriously the professions of ‘war aims’ that nations make". This included the Union's "moral" rationale for going to war. As such, Wilson's analysis of the Civil War, intentionally or not, echoes the now-discredited Lost Cause ideology. Historian David W. Blight wrote, Wilson used "language no diehard Lost Cause advocate of the turn of the 20th century nor neo-Confederate of the early 21st could improve upon" and "simply took no interest in black literature, and seemed completely unaware of slave narratives". For Blight, this ignorance "tells us much about Wilson's own moral blindness, but even more perhaps about the state of knowledge in elite white circles of African-American history and letters in the 1950s and even early 1960s." Indeed, Wilson almost entirely ignored African-American writers, with Forten an exception, notably neglecting to mention Frederick Douglass. Even so, as Robert Penn Warren noted, "Wilson is unsparing and witty in his treatment of the pretensions of the Southern myth."

Blight also characterized Wilson's introduction to the book as a "mesmerizing if troubling manifesto" written "in the midst of various Cold War crises," a "blunt and sustained critique of the Cold War and of war itself." Wilson posited that the moral fervor of the Civil War laid the groundwork for American global aggression in the 20th century. As Blight wrote, the introduction has thus been called "everything from shocking to naive to brilliant; some considered it unpatriotic, even un-American." The essayist Gore Vidal also picked up on this theme, regarding it with more sympathy. "In 1963," he wrote, "as pontifex maximus of the old American republic, Wilson is speaking out with a Roman hardness and clarity, and sadness at what has been lost since Appomattox. Our eighteenth-century res publicus had been replaced by a hard-boiled soft-minded imperium, ever eager to use that terrible swift sword, presumably forever."

When Wilson was honored by President John F. Kennedy at the White House in 1963 with a Presidential Medal of Freedom, the president asked him what Patriotic Gore was about. Wilson told him to go read it for himself.
