= Axël =

1890 play by Auguste Villiers de l'Isle-Adam

Axël is a drama by French writer Auguste Villiers de l'Isle-Adam, published in 1890. It was influenced by his participation in the Paris Commune, the Gnostic philosophy of Hegel as well as the works of Goethe and Victor Hugo. It begins in an occult castle. The Byronic hero Axël meets a Germanic princess, and after an initial conflict they fall in love. They speak of the amazing journeys they plan to have, but realizing life will never measure up to their dreams instead commit suicide.

== History ==
Axël was the work Villiers considered his masterpiece, although critical opinion has often been reluctant to agree with him, placing far higher value on his fiction. Villiers began work on the piece around 1869 and had still not put the finishing touches to it when he died. It was first published posthumously in 1890. The play is heavily influenced by the Romantic theatre of Victor Hugo, as well as Goethe's Faust and the music dramas of Richard Wagner. The last time it was staged was during the year 2006 in Québec and Montréal, directed by Christian Lapointe.

== Summary ==
The scene is set in Germany in 1828 and opens on Christmas Eve in the convent of Saint Apollodora, where the rich heiress Sara de Maupers is just about to take the veil. But when the archdeacon asks Sara whether she is ready to accept "light, hope and life", she replies "no". The religious authorities attempt to imprison Sara, but she manages to flee. The rest of the drama takes place in the castle of Axël d'Auersperg, a young nobleman distantly related to Sara. Axël's cousin Kaspar has learnt that a vast treasure is buried near the castle. He tries to persuade Axël to help him look for it but Axël refuses, the two quarrel and Axël kills Kaspar in a duel. In the third act, Axël's Rosicrucian tutor, Master Janus, prepares to initiate Axël into the occult mysteries. He asks his pupil whether he is ready to accept "light, hope and life", and Axël replies "no".

In Act Four, Axël decides to leave the castle forever and goes down to the crypt to say farewell to the tombs of his ancestors. Here he surprises Sara, who has been led to the castle by an old manuscript which tells of the location of the buried treasure. A door opens and the treasure pours out. Axël and Sara fight, then fall in love. Sara dreams of the glorious future the treasure will bring them but Axël manipulates Sara into believing that the world would only bring disappointment, he declares her dreams are far too magnificent to be fulfilled in everyday, unimaginative reality. It is Axël who thinks it's best to commit suicide. They decide to kill themselves with poison and die as the sun rises.

The play's most famous line is Axël's "Vivre? les serviteurs feront cela pour nous" ("Living? Our servants will do that for us.")

== Influence ==
Edmund Wilson's work Axel's Castle takes its title from the play. The book is an overview of the Symbolist movement, and uses the play to demonstrate the difference between Symbolism and Romanticism. Axël, he argues, is an example of the Symbolist heroes that prefer to "...drop out of common life than have to struggle to make themselves a place in it."

Roger Shattuck refers to the play as a "stilted yet impressive drama" and a "parodic echo of La Princesse de Clèves with the sexes reversed." Shattuck cites the play as an example of asceticism in French literature.

Colin Wilson's work The Outsider refers to this play.
