= Hugo Jalava =

Hugo Erikovich Jalava (3 February 1874 in Saint Petersburg – 28 April 1950 in Petrozavodsk) was a train driver and carried out administrative tasks in the Communist Party of the Soviet Union (CPSU). He is known for his role in the Russian Revolution, when he helped Lenin flee Finland in July 1917 and then return to Saint Petersburg shortly before the October Revolution.

== Life ==
=== Family and occupation ===
Hugo Erikovich Jalava was born on the 3. of February 1874 in Saint Petersburg. Not much is known about his childhood as many records were lost during the Second World War, as well as the Russian and Finnish civil wars.

In 1889, Jalava worked as a lathe operator in a factory, from which he was dismissed for being "unreliable". He got a position at the depot of the Finland Station in Saint Petersburg as a boiler cleaner in 1898 and later became a fireman. He became an assistant train driver in 1901 and then a train driver in 1904.

He married the worker Lydia Germanovna Jalava (1886–1975) in 1903. Together, they adopted three orphaned girls.

=== Political and revolutionary work ===
Hugo Jalava actively participated in the work of the railway union and vigorously defended the interests of the workers in the years of the first Russian Revolution (1905–1907). Jalava was chairman of the railway committee in the fall of 1905 during the political general strike in October. He repeatedly transported party members, money, weapons and illegal literature across the Finnish border. Starting 1907, "conspiratory" party actions were organised in his apartment.

Jalava was a member of the Social Democratic Party of Finland between 1906 and 1917.

=== Russian Revolution ===
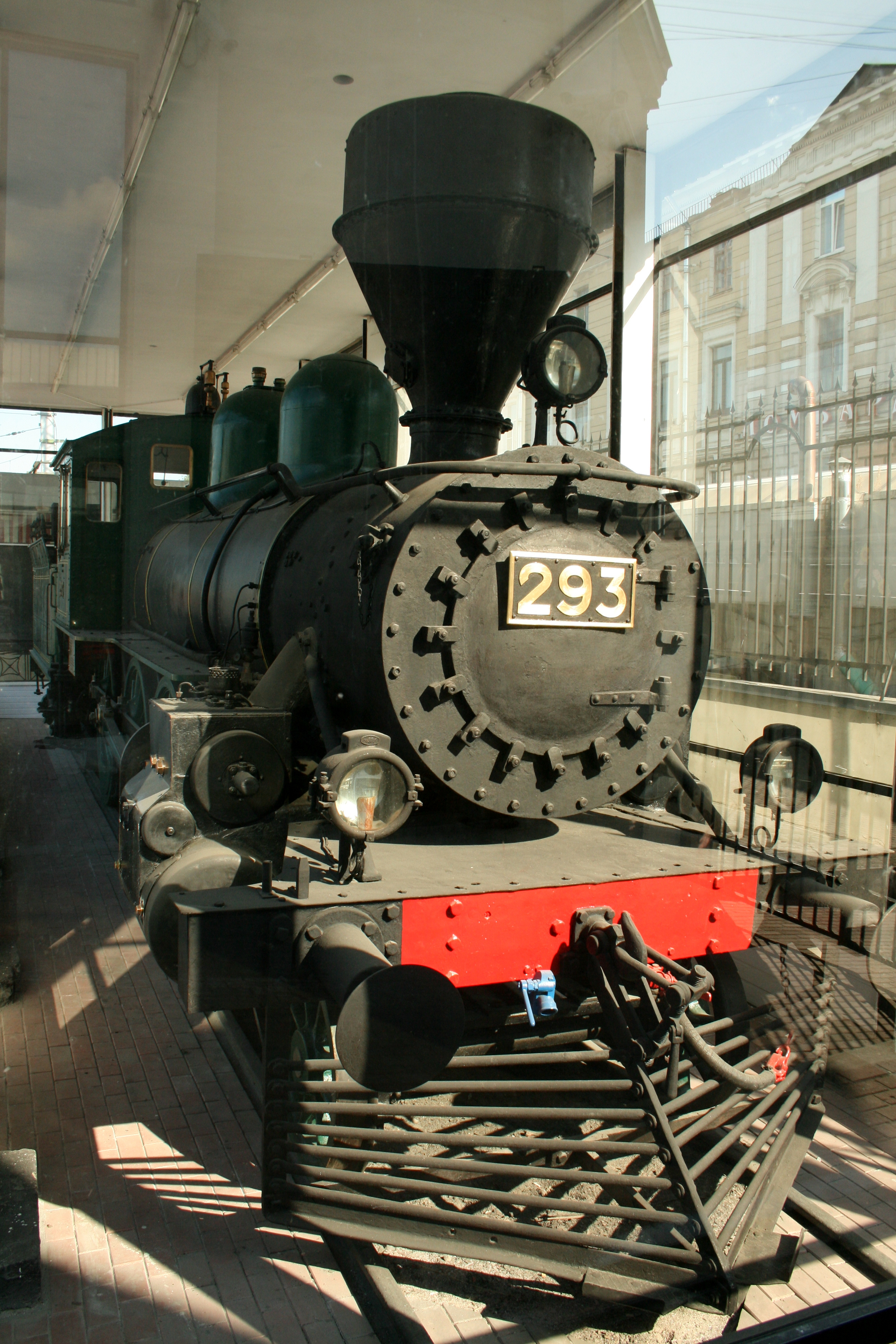
H2 293 as a Memorial-locomotive at the Finland Station in Saint. Petersburg

After the events of the July days in 1917, Jalava smuggled Lenin across the finish border twice with the steam engine H2 293. Disguised as a stoker, Lenin was able to stay undetected by the border patrols. From August to September, the Central Committee of the Russian Social Democratic Labour Party (RSDLP) maintained written communication with Lenin through Jalava. On October 14, 1917, Lenin held a meeting at Jalava's apartment in St. Petersburg with leading party workers and militant organizations under the Central Committee of the RSDLP to discuss preparations for an armed uprising.

In 1918 Jalava participated in the Finnish Civil War and was secretary of the foreign ministry of the revolutionary government. After the defeat of the revolution, Jalava returned to Saint Petersburg (then Petrograd). He worked as the head of the Secretariat Office for the Support of Finnish Refugees, which was established by the revolutionary government of Finland, and later in the People's Commissariat for Nationalities. In the years of the Russian Civil War, Jalava returned to the railway and worked as a driving instructor and senior official in the depot.

=== Continued life and activities ===
In 1921, Jalava was wrongly arrested due to a denunciation but was released on Lenin's personal order.

From 1925/26, Jalava was a member of the Communist Party of the Soviet Union (Bolsheviks). In 1930, he was sent to the Karelian Autonomous Soviet Socialist Republic (Karelian ASSR), where he worked in the apparatus of the Central Executive Committee and then in the Council of the People's Commissars of the Karelian ASSR.

During the German-Soviet War (1941–1945), Jalava worked in the administration of the Sverdlovsk Railway.

He returned to Petrozavodsk in 1947/48. From 1947 he worked in the Council of Ministers of the Karelo-Finnish Soviet Socialist Republic. During the last years of his life, Jalava lived in Petrozavodsk Lenin Street 13. He died in 1950. Jalava was buried at the Neglinsky Cemetery in Petrozavodsk.

In 1974, he was reburied in the honorary burial site of the Sulashgorsk Cemetery in Petrozavodsk.

== Awards ==
- For revolutionary and labor achievements (40th anniversary of his work activity), Jalava was awarded the title of Hero of Socialist Labour on November 30, 1931.
- In 1948, on the 25th anniversary of the Karelian Autonomous Soviet Socialist Republic, he was awarded the Order of Lenin.

== Rememberence ==
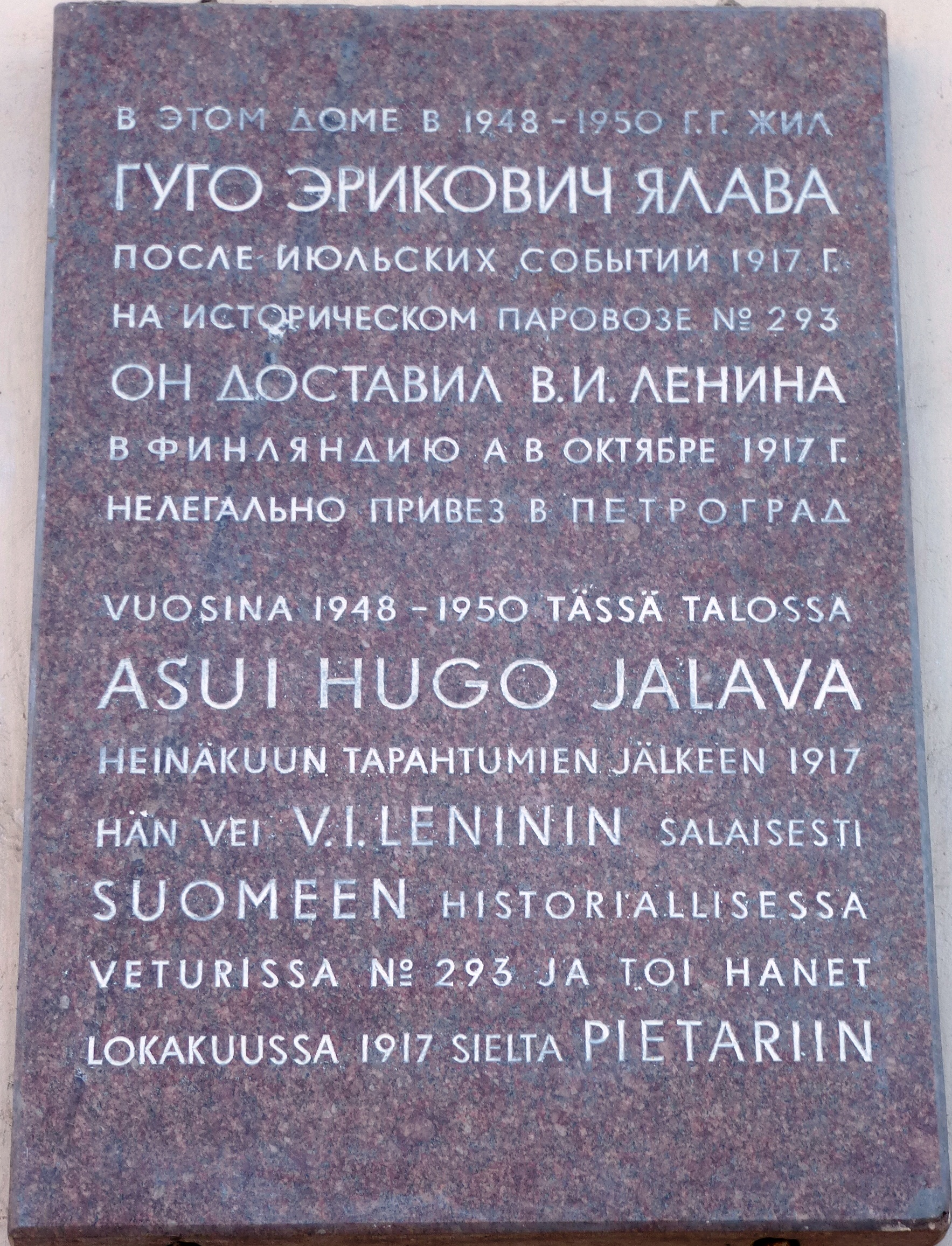
Memorial plaque for Jalava in Petrozavodsk

- In 1970, a memorial plaque made of pink granite with Russian and Finnish text was placed on the house at Lenin Street 13 in Petrozavodsk. The inscription on the plaque roughly reads: "In this house lived Hugo Erikovich Jalava from 1948 to 1950. Following the events of July 1917, he brought V. I. Lenin to Finland with the historic locomotive No. 293 and brought him illegally to Petrograd in October 1917."
- The Viennese band Schmetterlinge paid musical tribute to him in the most famous track of the album Proletenpassion (1977). The "Jalava-Lied", describes how Jalava smuggled Lenin to St. Petersburg on his locomotive in 1917.

== Literature ==
- "Two Meetings with Ilyich at the Steam Locomotive." In Leningradskaya Pravda on April 16, 1924.
- "Fireman of Steam Locomotive Number 293." In "Memories of Vladimir Ilyich Lenin," Volume 2, Moscow 1969.
- "Sparks Flew – Petrozavodsk: Karelia"
- “Jalava-lied- die Schmetterlinge
