= Statue of Lenin at Finland Station =

Statue in Saint Petersburg, Russia

Coordinates: 59°57′15″N 30°21′20″E

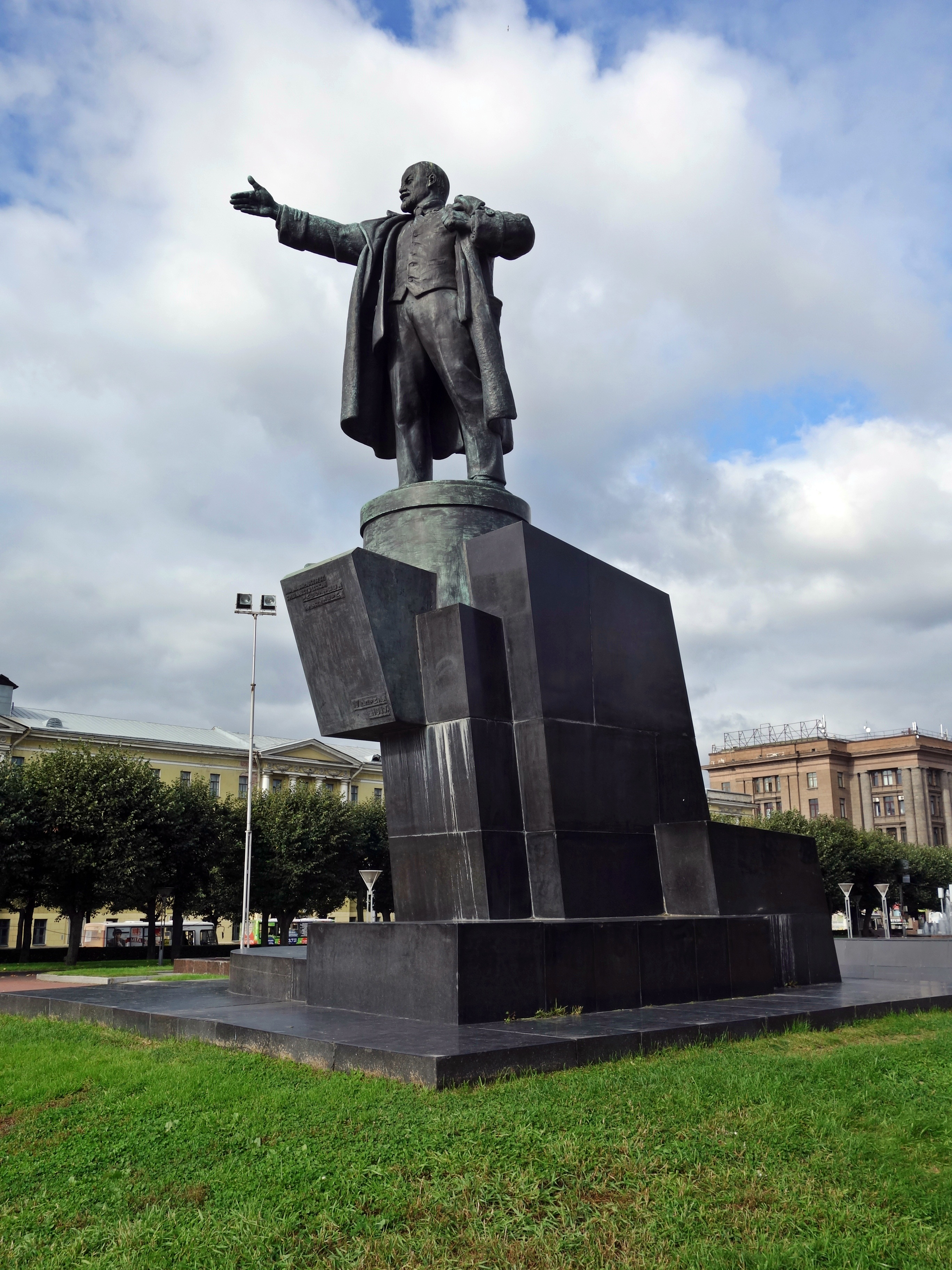
- The statue, with Mikhailovskaya Military Artillery Academy behind
- Year: 1926
- Medium: Bronze sculpture
- Subject: Vladimir Lenin
- Location: Saint Petersburg, Russia

The statue of Lenin at Finland Station in Saint Petersburg is one of the most famous statues of Vladimir Lenin in Russia. Erected in 1926, it was one of the first large-scale statues of Lenin, being completed within three years of his death. It depicts the man making a speech from atop an armoured car, soon after his 1917 arrival at the station from exile abroad. It was designed in an early constructivist style by sculptor Sergei A. Evseev and architects Vladimir Shchuko and Vladimir Helfreich. The style and pose of the statue were imitated by later works. The statue is one of few in Saint Petersburg that survived after the fall of the Soviet Union. It was damaged in a 2009 bomb attack but has since been repaired.

== Lenin at Finland Station ==
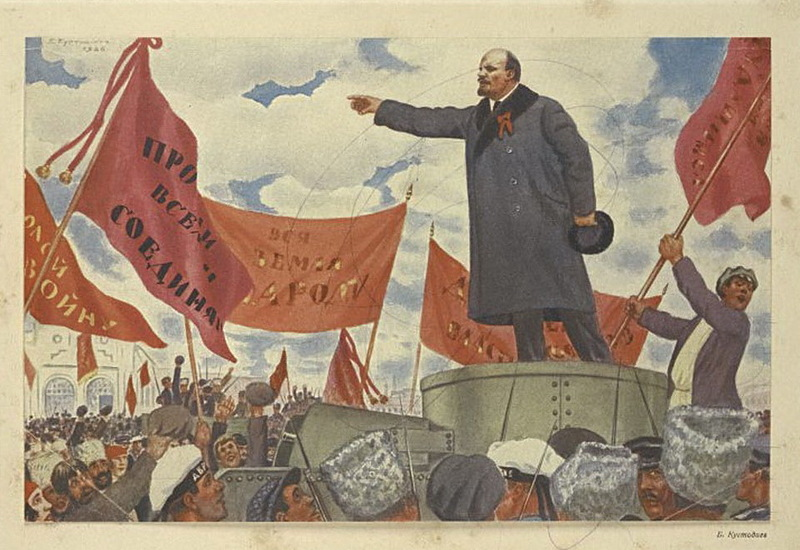
A depiction of Lenin speaking from atop an armoured car that inspired the statue

Russian revolutionary leader Vladimir Lenin had been living in exile in Switzerland during the First World War. After the February Revolution he was permitted by the German authorities to travel via sealed train across German territory to Petrograd (as Saint Petersburg was then known), via neutral Sweden. Arriving at the city's Finland Station on April 16, 1917, he was met by a crowd of Bolshevik sympathisers and climbed onto the turret of an armoured car. He rode the car to the Bolshevik headquarters at the Kshesinskaya Palace and delivered a speech in favour of Bolshevism and denouncing the moderate Mensheviks and Socialist Revolutionary Party. After the Russian Civil War, Lenin led the communist Soviet Union, but died of a stroke on 21 January 1924.

== Statue ==
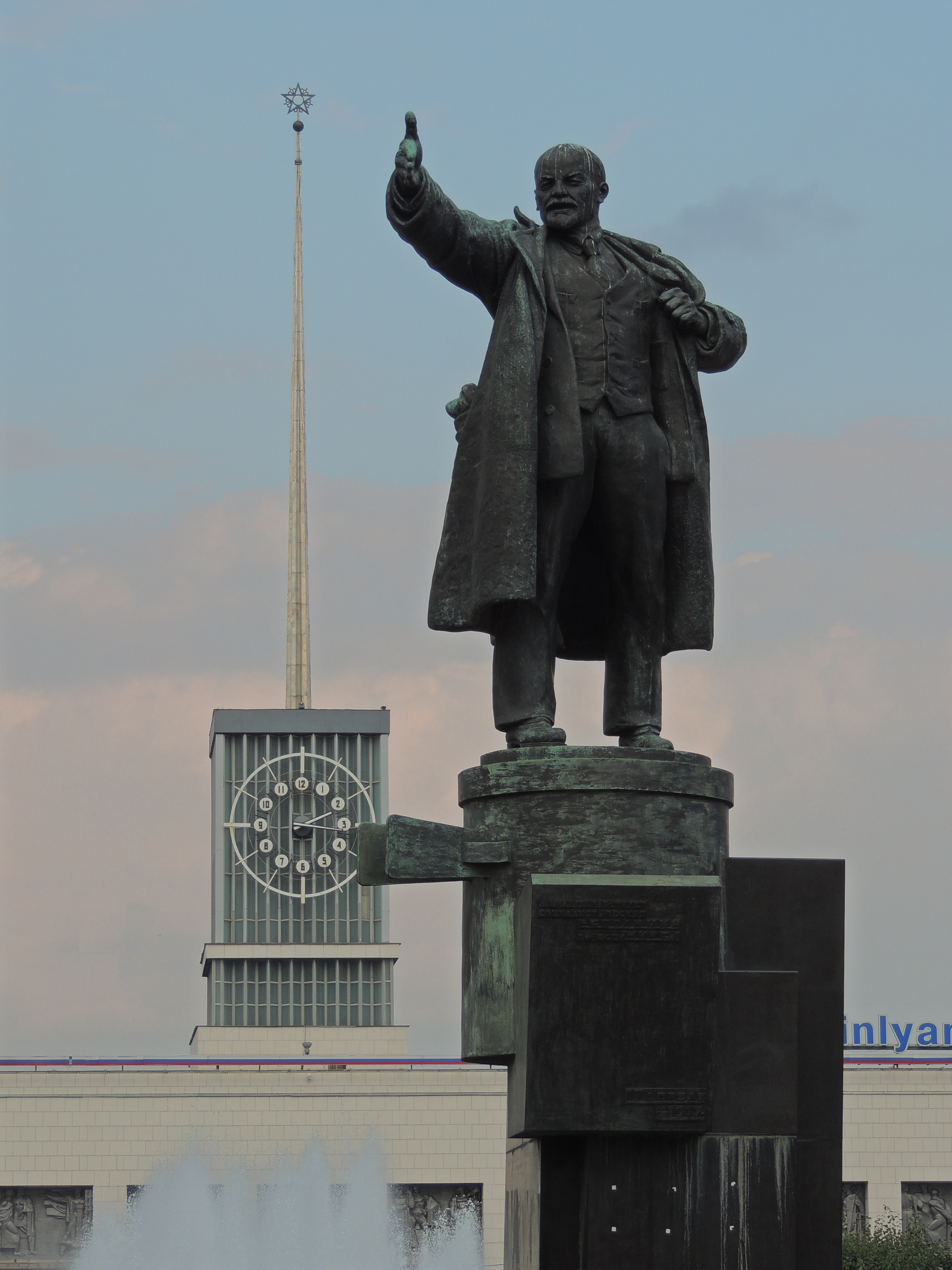
Detail of statue, with station behind

The statue, erected in 1926, is one of the first largescale statues of Lenin erected in the Soviet Union, though it is predated by one in Volgograd. The statue depicts Lenin in the act of making a speech from atop the armoured car. The statue was created in an early constructivist style by sculptor Sergei A. Evseev and architects Vladimir Shchuko and V.G. Gelfreich. The figure is made of bronze while the plinth, representing the armoured car, is of stone.

The statue depicts Lenin in a suit and tie with waistcoat and overcoat, clothing associated with his later position as leader of the Soviet Union, rather than his 1917 attire as a revolutionary leader. As with other depictions of Lenin from this period he is depicted bareheaded (his hat is shown tucked into the right-hand pocket of the overcoat). Lenin is depicted with his right arm raised to shoulder height, palm forwards and thumb upraised. This "taxi-hailing" pose is common to many Lenin statues, though Berkeley Professor Laura Bonnell states that this depiction differs from later versions in that Lenin's arm is used to indicate a directional movement, rather than offering a benediction to the masses. The statue's left hand holds the lapels of Lenin's overcoat and suit jacket. The monument is described by Oxford Professor Penelope Curtis as the "first important monument" of Lenin and establishing a style that has been much repeated by later statues. Joseph Brodsky thought the statue the first ever to depict a person on top of an armoured car and compared it to the tradition of equestrian statues of previous leaders.

== History ==
The statue was unveiled on 7 November 1926. It originally stood in a small square in front of the station, it was moved to a new position when the square was remodelled after the Second World War and a new, larger Lenin Square was created. It faces across the square toward the River Neva and the Bolshoy Dom, formerly the headquarters of the KGB in the city and now used by the Federal Security Service. By 1979 every station in Leningrad (Petrograd had been renamed again five days after Lenin's death) had a statue or bust of Lenin. After the fall of the Soviet Union in 1991 the majority of these were torn down; the Finland Station statue is one of the few that remain and is one of the most famous in the country.

At 4.30am on 1 April 2009 the statue was attacked by a bomb. A hole measuring 80–100 centimetres (31–39 in) was blown in the buttocks of the statue. The attackers were never caught. The statue was taken away for repair and reinstalled in April 2010.

== Gallery ==
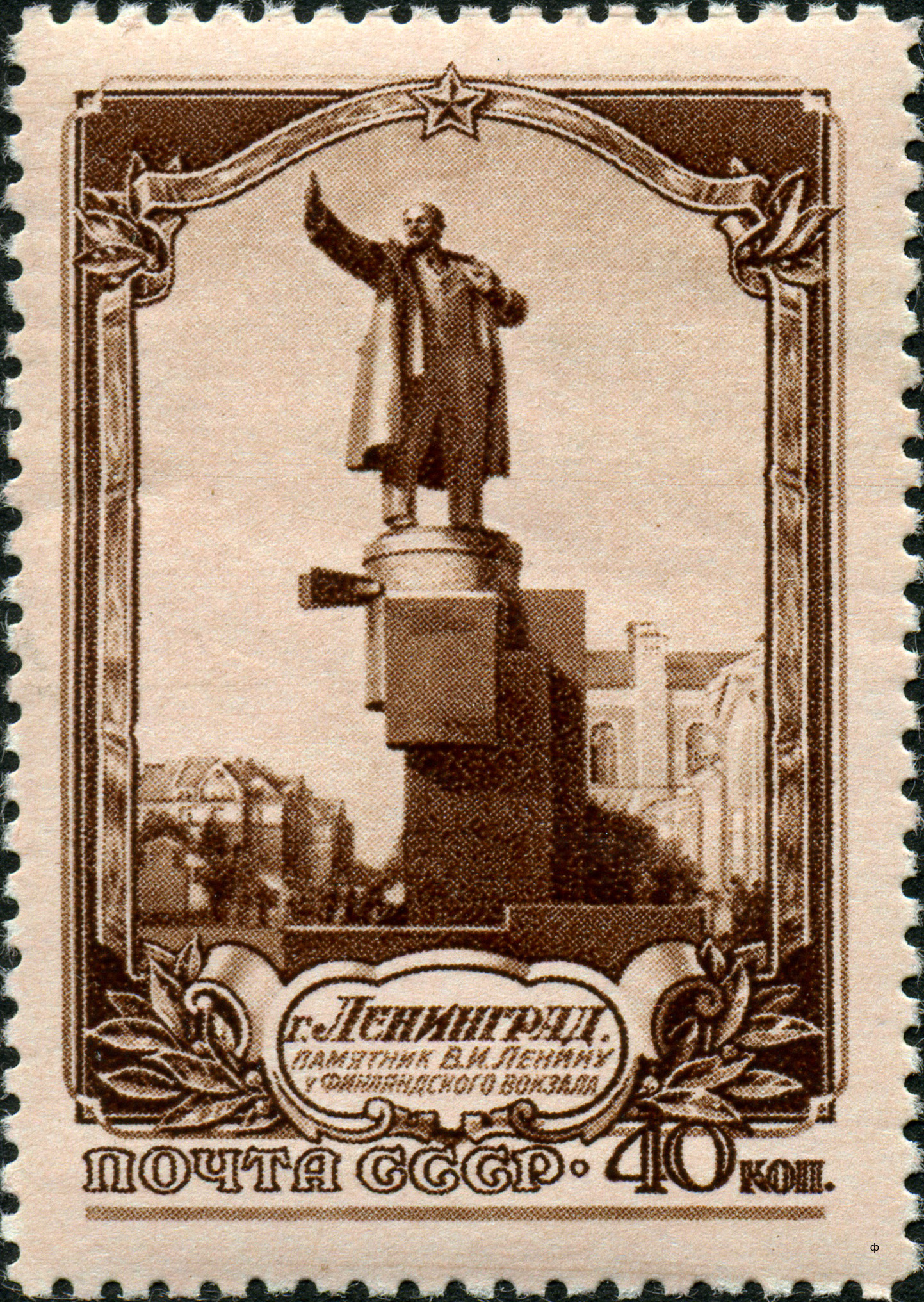
On a Soviet-era stamp

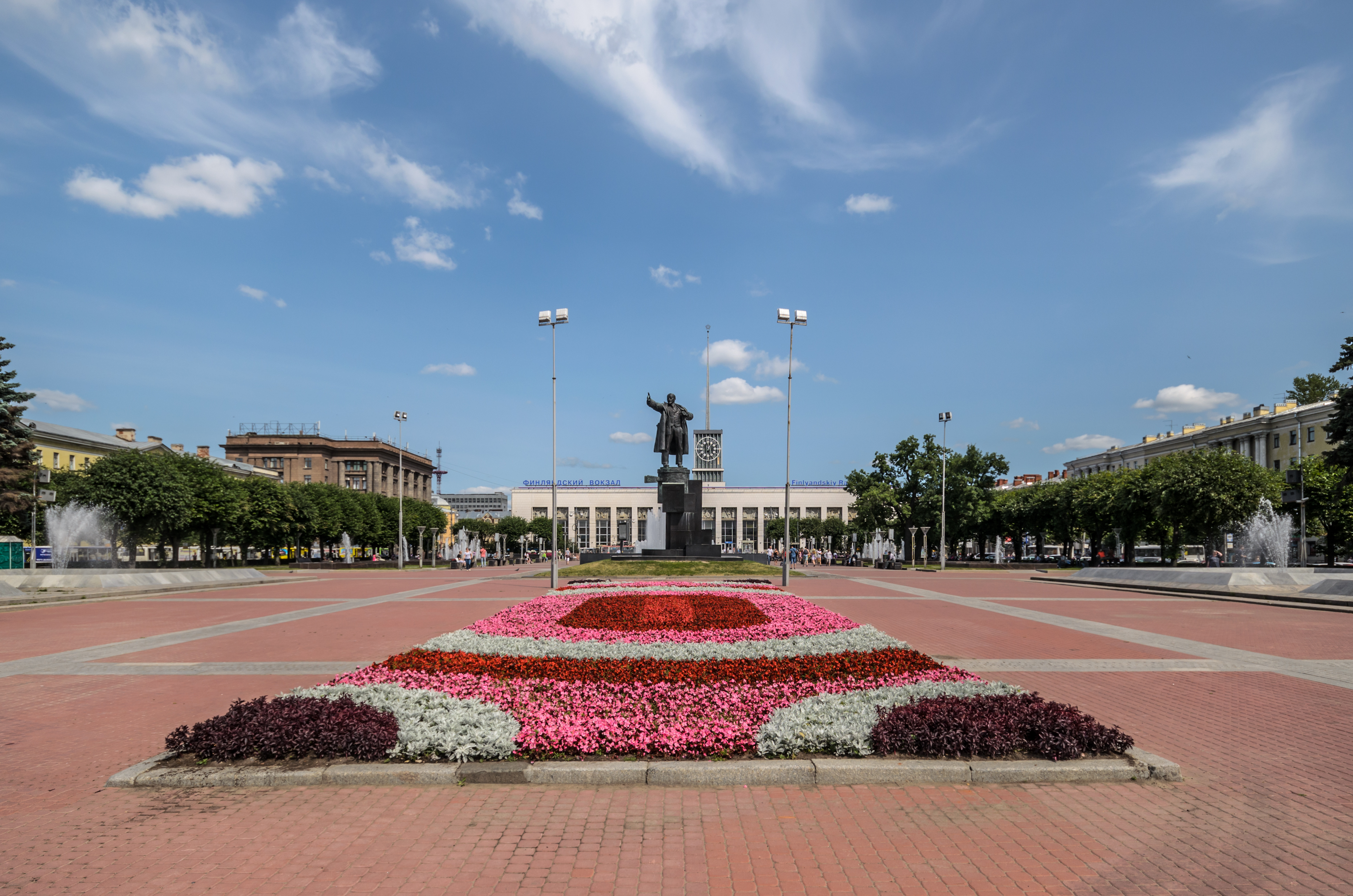
Setting in Lenin Square

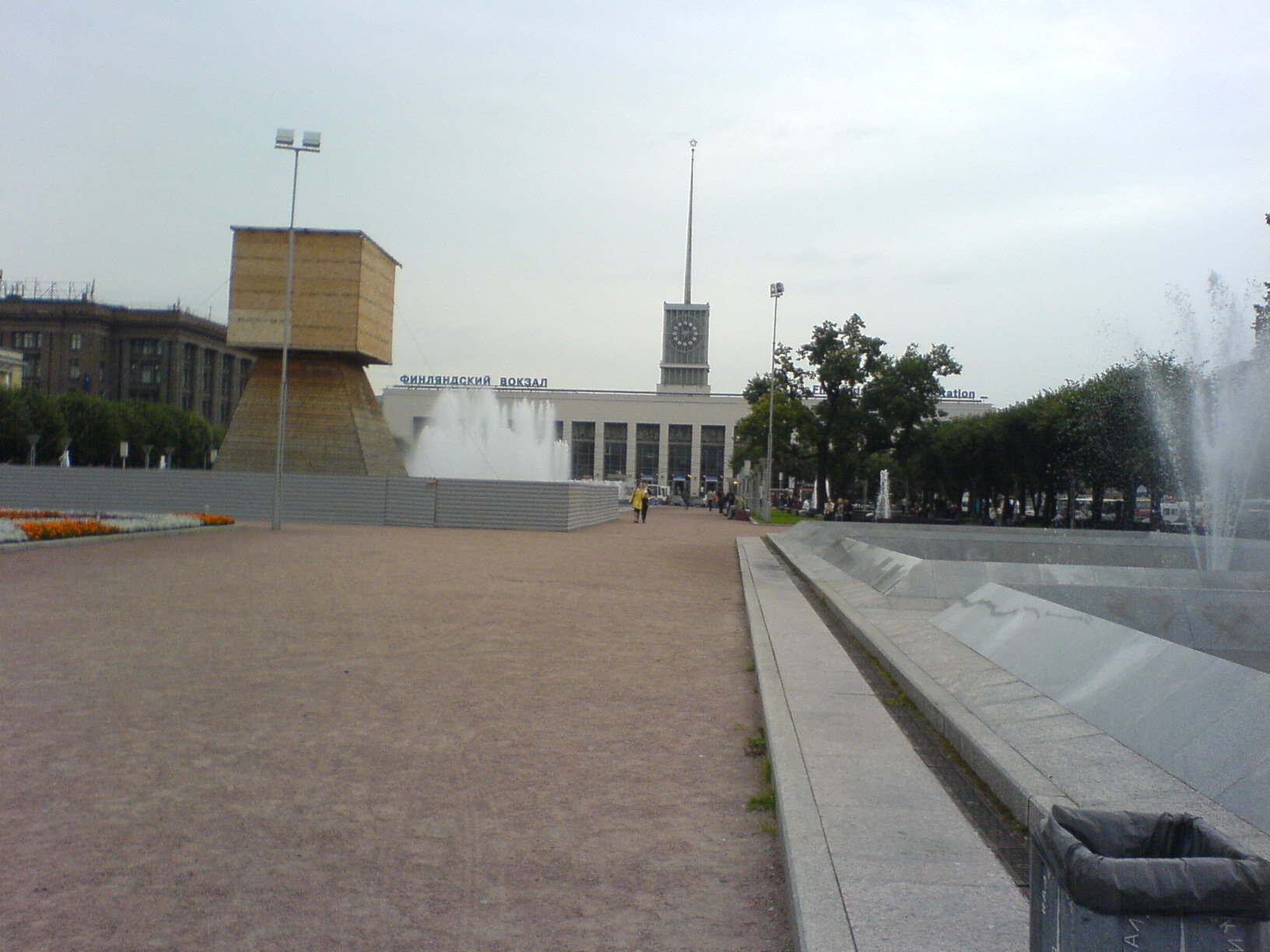
Plinth boarded up and statue removed in 2009

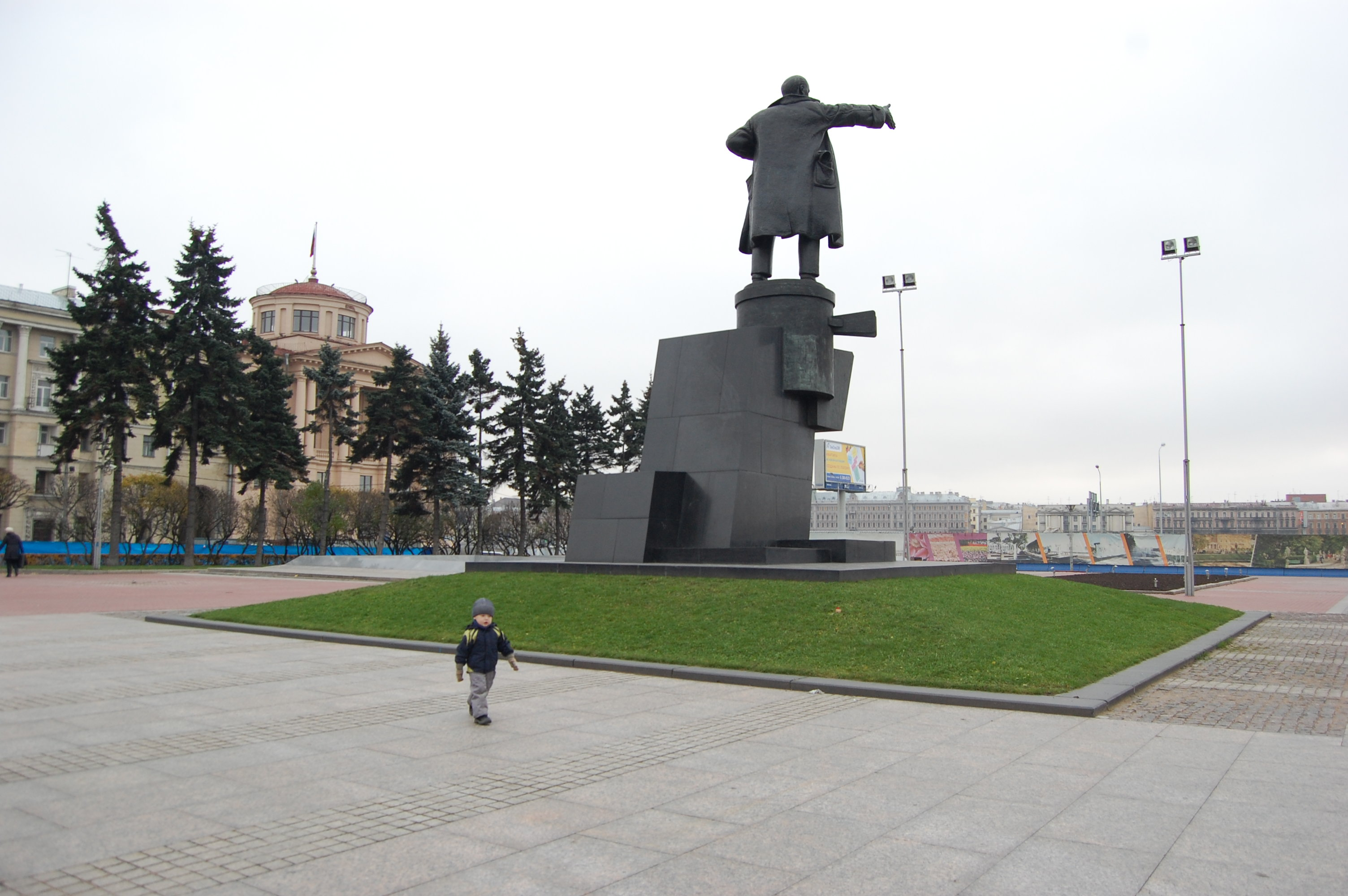
Rear of statue
