= Memoirs of Hecate County =

1946 work of fiction by American writer Edmund Wilson

First edition (publ. Doubleday)

Memoirs of Hecate County is a work of fiction by Edmund Wilson, first published in 1946, but banned in the state of New York until 1959, when it was reissued with minor revisions by the author. After falling out of print it was republished in 2004 by NYRB Classics.

The book includes six short stories, three of which had been previously published. Although it is sometimes described as a novel, the only link between the six stories is the narrator, an "upper-middle-class intellectual", describing dysfunctional American society through sexual liaisons and friendships.

The book was popular, and the author later described it as his "favorite among my books."

== Stories ==
The Man Who Shot Snapping Turtles

First published in Atlantic Monthly.

The unnamed narrator befriends a neighbor of his, Asa M. Stryker who is fascinated by ducks who frequent a pond on his property and is disgusted by the snapping turtles which prey on them. Unable to abolish the turtles he consults another neighbor, Clarence Latouche, who works as a copywriter and advises him that rather than destroy the turtles he should celebrate their resilience and begin to harvest them and sell them for turtle soup. Stryker takes this advice and becomes a wealthy man. Latouche grows jealous and demands more of the profits. Stryker is remarkably amiable to the idea which makes Latouche suspicious as he recalls that Stryker is a chemist and much of his previous money was due to inheritances from dead relatives. He takes one of Stryker's guns and murders him before fleeing. The murder is blamed on one of Stryker's guards and Latouche spends the rest of his days in poverty, fearful that the guard will one day be caught and he will have to confess.

Ellen Terhune

First published in Partisan Review.

The unnamed narrator pays a visit to Ellen Terhune, a talented composer whose husband is leaving her after a long and unhappy marriage. In subsequent visits he notices a change in her and then meets some of her odd relatives, eventually coming to realize he is travelling back in time meeting child Ellen and her mother at key points in their lives. At his last visit he realizes that Ellen has also been travelling in time, hoping to justify her own existence to her mother and unable to as her mother is not truly musical despite being a musician. He tries to tell Ellen she is truly talented but before he can he returns to the present day of 1926 where he learns that Ellen died while trying to compose one last piece.

Glimpses of Wilbur Flick

First published in Town & Country.

At college the narrator meets the odd, very wealthy Wilbur Flick and they stay in contact as Flick loses some of his fortune and is forced to move to Hecate County. Flick is a layabout with various obsessions, eventually developing a passion for magic. Though he develops a successful performance his bitterness and jealousies get in the way of his success. The narrator last meets him in Spain at a fundraiser for the Spanish Republic.

The Princess with the Golden Hair

Novella.

After his long-term married lover leaves Hecate County the narrator becomes obsessed with the beautiful Imogen Loomis and pursues her despite the fact that she is married and is uninterested in an affair. After an aimless summer spent pursuing Imogen, the narrator decides to write a book and moves to New York City where he meets a beautiful Ukrainian immigrant named Anna Lenihan and begins an affair with her. Anna eventually confesses she is married and has a child but these two things do not deter him. Imogen re-enters the narrator's life and eventually reveals that her reluctance to be sexual stems from a chronic back injury. Anna's husband, a petty criminal, dies in jail and the narrator finds his affair with her deepening into something more serious. Nevertheless he continues to pursue Imogen and, after two years of pursuit, they begin a sexual affair which Imogen seems almost indifferent to. The narrator eventually drops Imogen to focus his attention on Anna, however after his initial lover returns he abandons Anna too, telling her to remarry. Moving back to Hecate County he realizes that he should have focused more on Anna but is nevertheless drawn to his old habits and old society.

The Milhollands and Their Damned Soul

The narrator, on the verge of publishing a book, reacquaints himself with the Milhollands, a family of scholars who reinvent themselves as book critics and publishers and who continue to peddle increasingly mediocre works to the masses, evading scandal and making money at every turn.

Mr and Mrs Blackburn at Home

The narrator contemplates leaving Hecate County and marrying his wealthy lover. He spends the evening socializing with friends at the home of Mr. and Mrs. Blackburn, European emigrés.

== Censorship ==
The book was published by Doubleday in March 1946, and about 60,000 copies were sold. In July, the New York Society for the Suppression of Vice lodged a complaint, and 130 copies were seized from four bookstores owned by Doubleday and from the New York Public Library. The book received a $1,000 fine. The ban was challenged by the publisher but in 1947 was upheld 2–1 by the New York Court of Appeals, the state's highest court, with a dissent by Nathan D. Perlman.

The case went to the U.S. Supreme Court in 1948, which upheld the decision 4–4, with Felix Frankfurter not participating. The book was no longer sold in the United States but was published in the United Kingdom by W. H. Allen in June 1951, going through six impressions in just two years.

The book was also banned in Australia.

Throughout the 1950s there was intense public debate about the censorship of literary works, and in 1958 the publication of Lolita (by Wilson's friend Vladimir Nabokov) demonstrated the extent to which public attitudes had relaxed. In June 1959, Memoirs of Hecate County was republished in New York by Octagon and L. C. Page. This revised edition appeared in the United Kingdom in March 1960, published by Panther.

Memoirs of Hecate County was deemed obscene due to a single one of the short stories, "The Princess with the Golden Hair", and not the entire book.
