= Fireman (steam engine) =

Person whose occupation it is to tend the fire for the running of a boiler

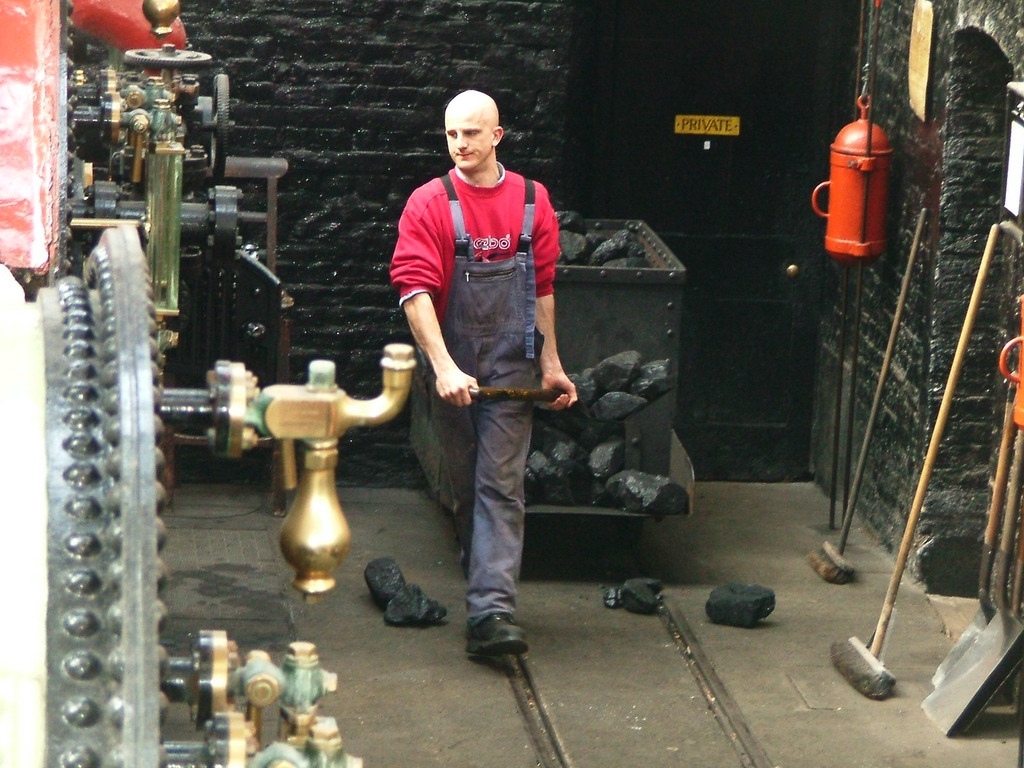
A fireman or stoker, sometimes called a "boilerman"

A fireman, stoker or boilerman is a person who tends the fire for the running of a boiler, heating a building, or powering a steam engine. Much of the job is hard physical labor, such as shoveling fuel, typically coal, into the boiler's firebox. On steam locomotives, the title fireman is usually used, while on steamships and stationary steam engines, such as those driving saw mills, the title is usually stoker (although the British Merchant Navy did use fireman). The German word Heizer is equivalent and in Dutch the word stoker is mostly used too. The United States Navy referred to them as watertenders.

== Nautical ==
=== Royal Navy ===
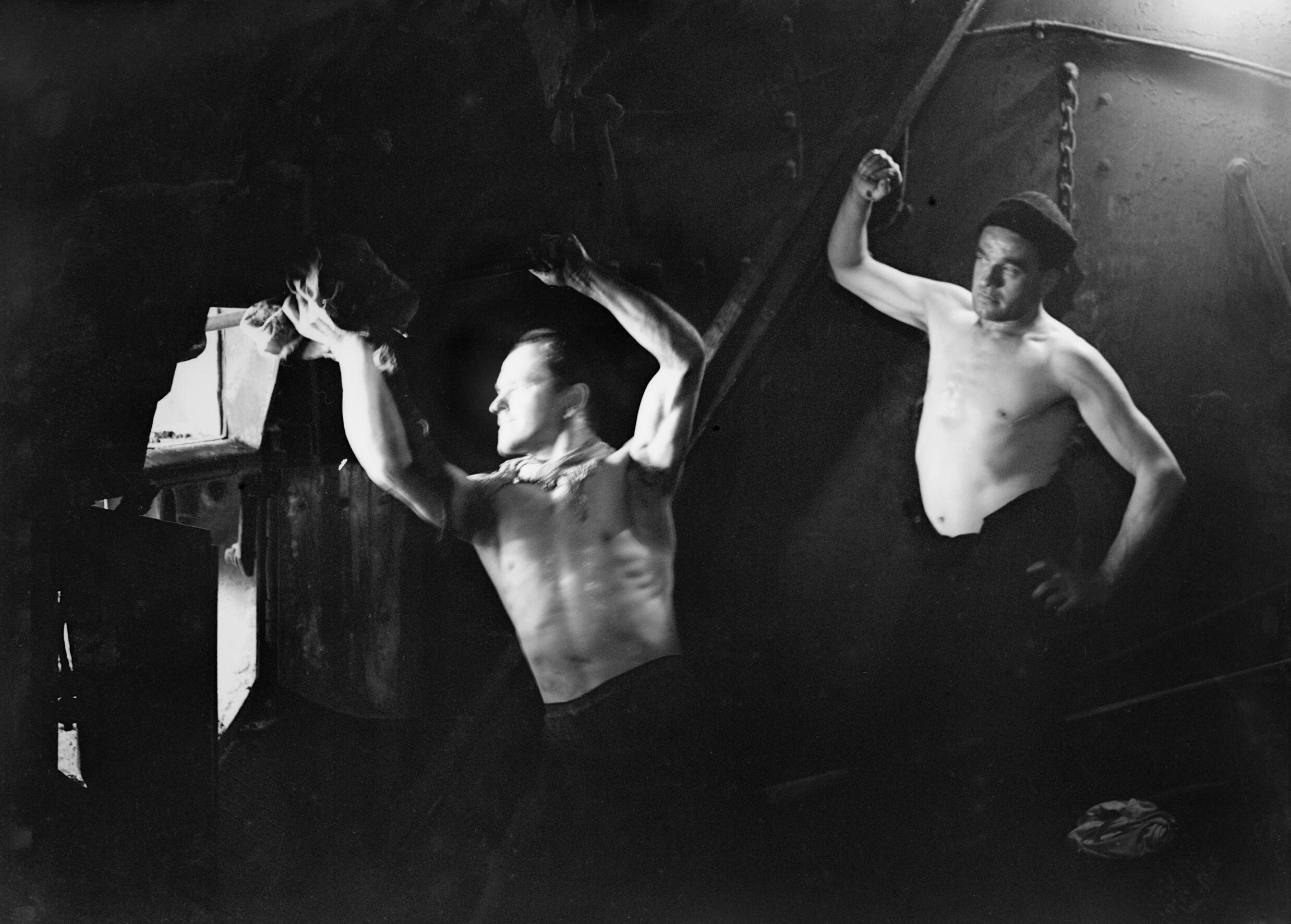
Stokers in the boiler room on board HMT Stella Pegasi, Scapa Flow, 6 June 1943

The Royal Navy used the rank structure stoker 2nd class, stoker 1st Class, leading stoker, stoker petty officer and chief stoker. The non-substantive (trade) badge for stokers was a ship's propeller. "Stoker" remains the colloquial term for a marine engineering rating, despite the decommissioning of the last coal-fired naval vessel many years ago.

Large coal-fueled vessels also had individuals working as coal trimmers, who delivered coal from the coal bunkers to the stokers. They were responsible for all coal handling with the exception of the actual fueling of the boilers.

=== Royal Canadian Navy ===
The Royal Canadian Navy had coal-fired ships, the last of which were replenishment ships. All marine engineers in the RCN, regardless of their platform (CPF, 280 or AOR) are nicknamed stokers.

=== United States Navy ===
In the United States Navy, watertender (abbreviated WT) was a petty officer rating which existed from 1884 to 1948. Watertenders held a paygrade equivalent to today's petty officer first class. A chief watertender (CWT) paygrade was established in 1903. In 1921, the lower paygrade was split into watertender first class (WT1 or WT1c) and watertender second class (WT2 or WT2c). Another lower paygrade, watertender third class (WT3 or WT3c), was established in 1943. The watertender and boilermaker ratings were merged into a new "Boilerman" rating in 1948 and continued to 1976 when the rating was changed to "Boiler Technician" and subsequently merged into the "machinist's mate" rating in 1996.

== Railways ==
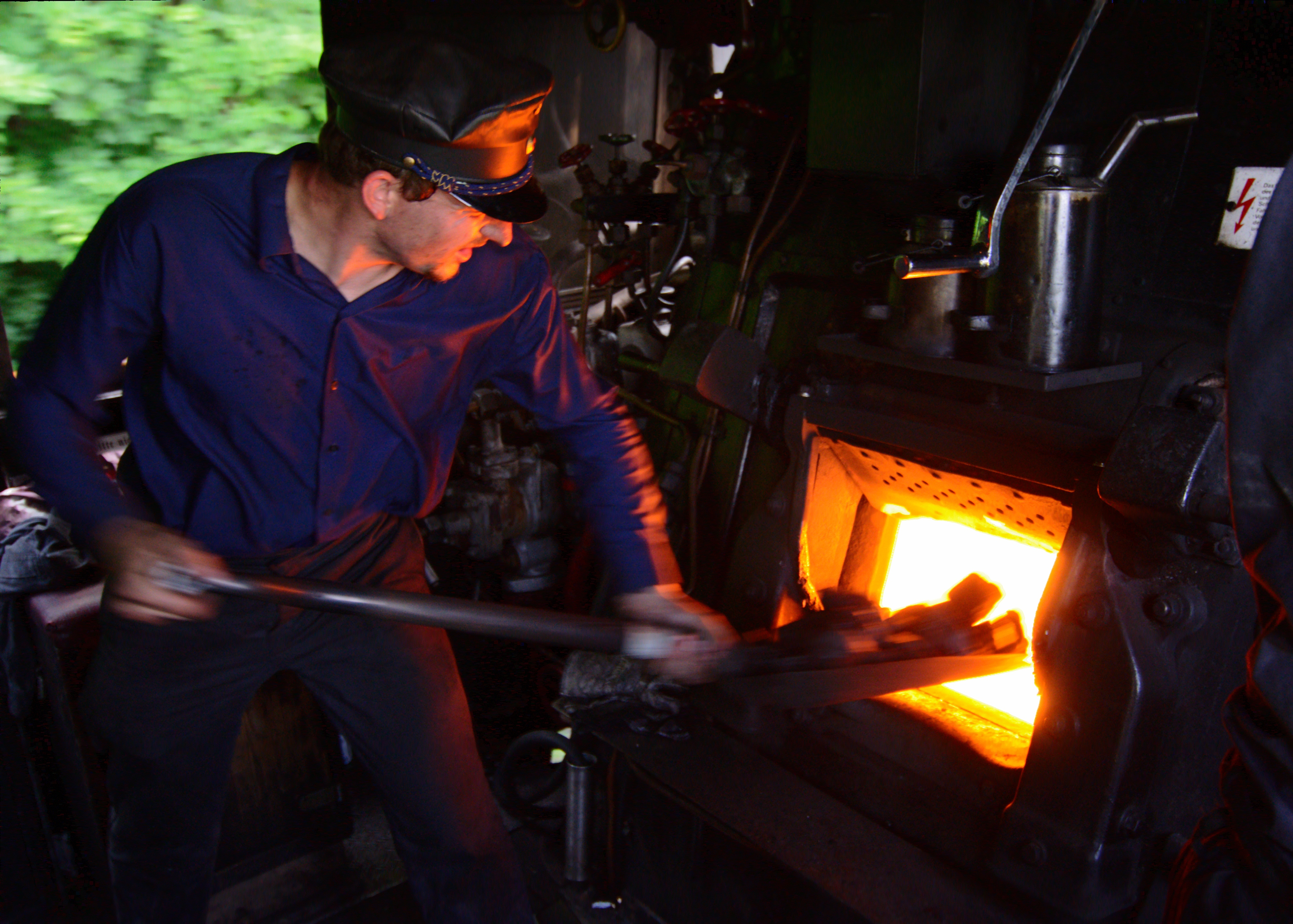
A fireman working on a German Class 52 steam locomotive

On steam locomotives, firemen were not usually responsible for initially preparing locomotives and lighting their fires. As a locomotive boiler takes several hours to heat up, and a too-rapid fire-raising can cause excess wear on a boiler, this task was usually performed by fire lighters working some hours before the fireman's main shift started. Only on small railways, or on narrow-gauge locomotives with smaller and faster-warming boilers, was the fire lit by the fireman.

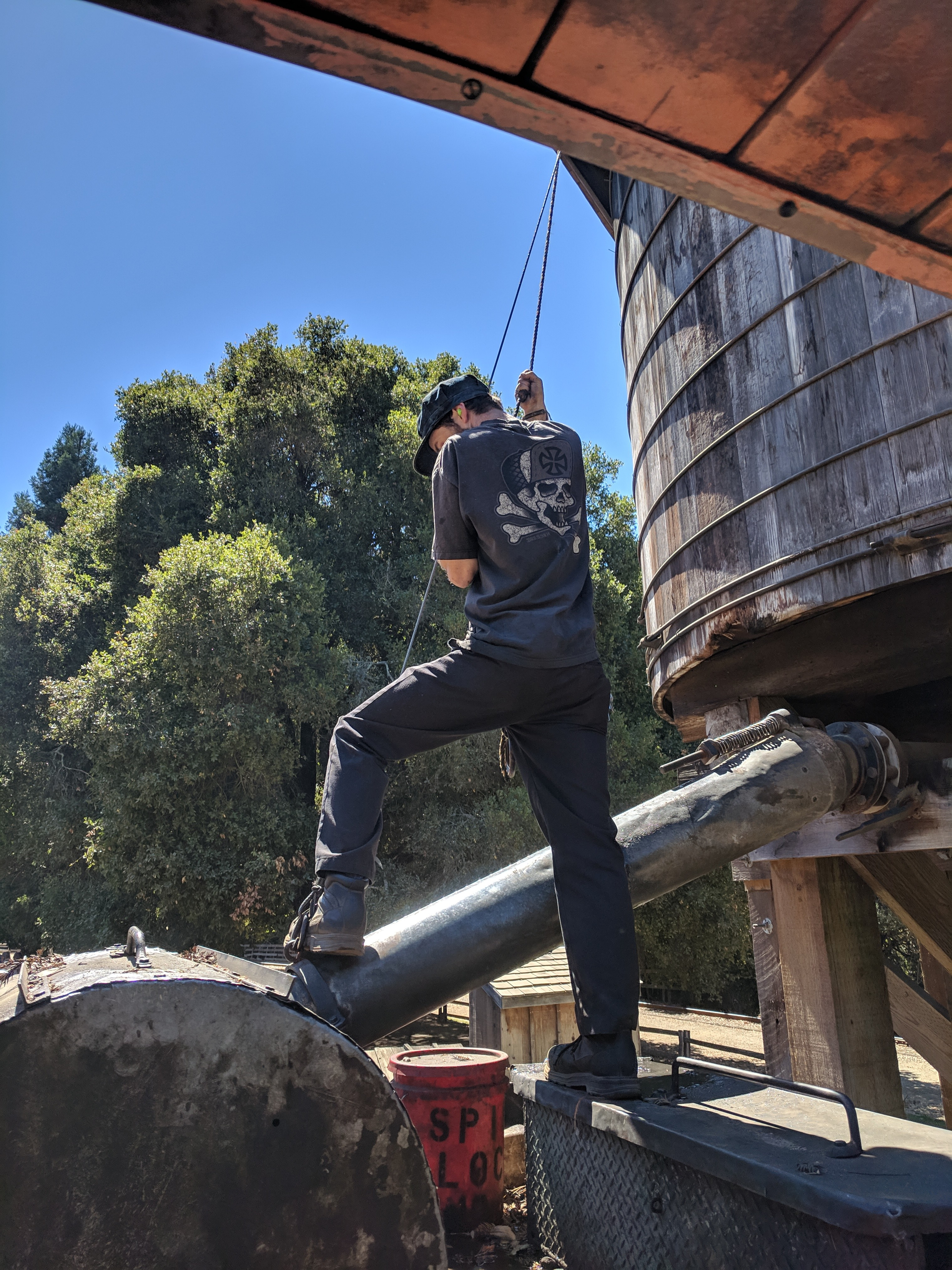
A fireman refills the water tank of a steam locomotive.

Whoever was responsible for fire-starting would clear the ash from the firebox ashpan prior to lighting the fire, adding water to the engine's boiler, making sure there is a proper supply of fuel for the engine aboard before starting journeys, starting the fire, raising or banking the fire as appropriate for the amount of power needed along particular parts of the route, and performing other tasks for maintaining the locomotive according to the orders of the engineer (US) or driver (UK). The engine itself was cleaned by an engine cleaner instead of the fireman. Some firemen served these duties as a form of apprenticeship, aspiring to be locomotive engineers themselves. In the present day, the position of fireman still exists on the Union Pacific Railroad, but it refers to an engineer in training. The fireman may operate the locomotive under the direct supervision of the engineer. When the fireman is not operating the locomotive, the fireman assists the engineer and monitors the controls.

== Mechanical stoker ==
A mechanical stoker is a device which feeds coal into the firebox of a boiler. It is standard equipment on large stationary boilers and was also fitted to large steam locomotives to ease the burden of the fireman. The locomotive type has a screw conveyor (driven by an auxiliary steam engine) which feeds the coal into the firebox. The coal is then distributed across the grate by steam jets, controlled by the fireman. Power stations usually use pulverized coal-fired boilers.

== Notable stokers ==
Vladimir Lenin, disguised as Konstantin Petrovich Ivanov, escaped to Finland in 1917 on train 293 from Udelnaya Station. Hugo Erikowitsch Jalawa, a co-conspirator and the train's driver, helped to further conceal Lenin by having him work as his stoker. Jalava later recalled that Lenin shovelled with gusto as he fed the engine, making the train run fast.

There were approximately 176 stokers on board the coal-fed ocean liner RMS Titanic. During the sinking of the ship, these men disregarded their own safety and stayed below deck to keep the steam-driven electric generators running for the radiotelegraph, lighting, and water pumps. Only 48 of them survived.

Simeon T. Webb was the fireman on the Cannonball Express when it was destroyed in the legendary wreck that killed engineer Casey Jones. Jones's last words were "Jump, Sim, jump!" and Webb did jump, survived, and became a primary source for information about the famous wreck.

KFC founder Colonel Sanders worked as a railroad stoker when he was 16 or 17.

A 14-year-old Martin Luther King Sr. worked as a fireman on the Atlanta railroad.

== Depictions in popular culture and art ==
=== Art ===
- Torsten Billman, a Swedish graphic artist, drawer, and mural painter - himself coal trimmer and stoker on various merchant ships from 1926 to 1932 - has portrayed the hard work in coal bunkers and stokeholes.

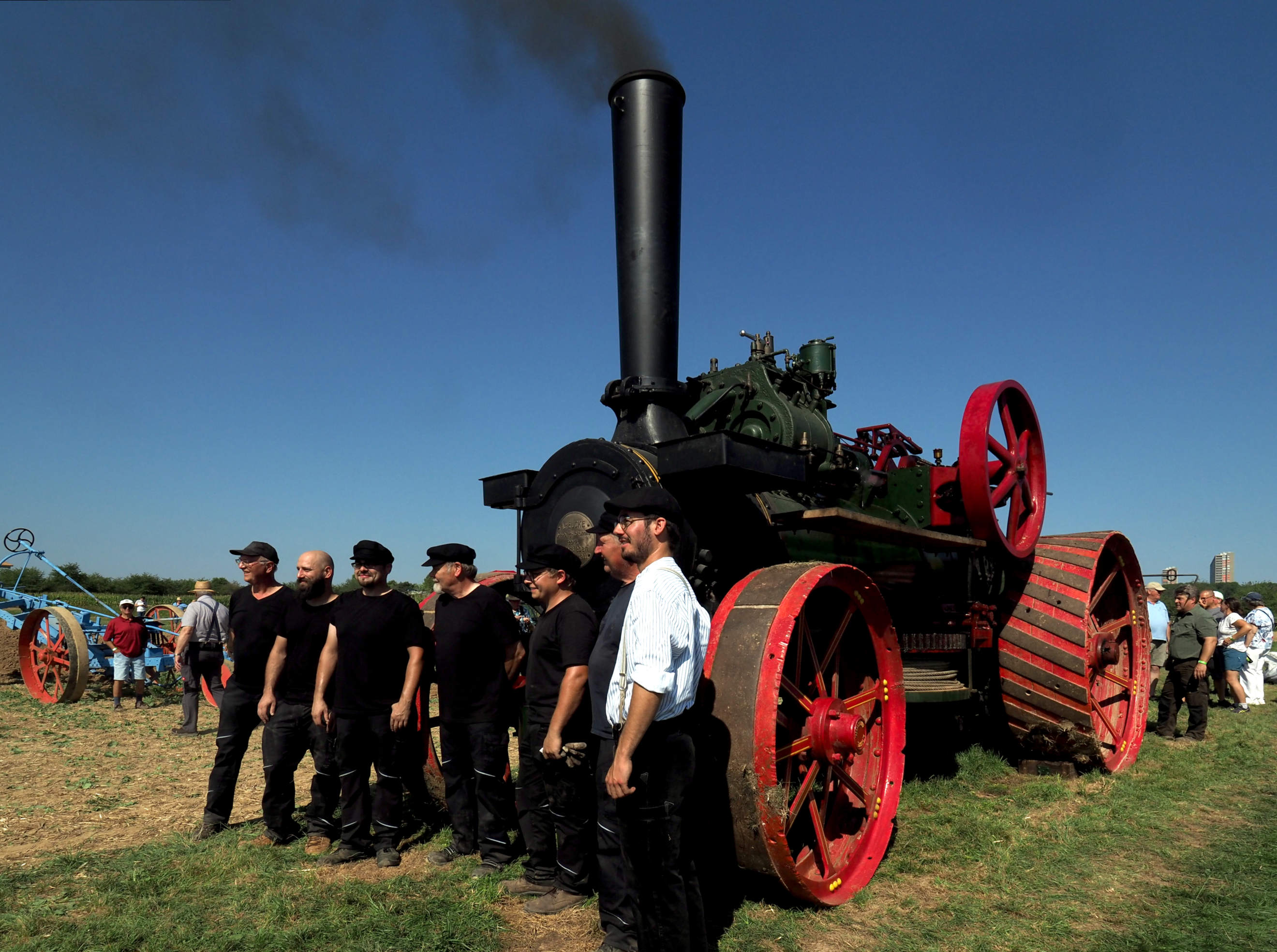
Engineers and stokers of a ploughing engine on Heritage Day

=== Events ===
- Top Gear's Jeremy Clarkson acted as stoker on the steam locomotive No. 60163 Tornado while performing a Race to the North against Richard Hammond and James May. It was an homage to the historical Race to the North, a rivalry between British steam engines, trains and men of different companies between London and Edinburgh.

=== Film ===
- The lead character Bill Roberts (George Bancroft) in Josef von Sternberg's motion picture The Docks of New York (1928) is a stoker.
- The lead character in Aleksei Balabanov's 2010 film The Stoker, Ivan Matveyevich Skryabin, is a stoker.

=== Literature ===
- The first chapter of Franz Kafka's novel Amerika (published posthumously in 1927) is entitled "The Stoker".
- Mat Burke, a principal role in Eugene O'Neill's play Anna Christie (1921) is a ship's stoker.
- Yank, the protagonist of Eugene O'Neill's play The Hairy Ape (1922), is a stoker on a ship.

=== Music ===
- "Casey Jones", a song by the American rock band the Grateful Dead, is about a railroad engineer who is on the verge of a train wreck due to his train going too fast, a sleeping switch man, and another train being on the same track and headed for him. The last two lines of the song reference the train's fireman: "Come round the bend, you know it's the end. The fireman screams and the engine just gleams."
- "Stoker Dreams" and "Stoker Love" are songs by the Russian indie group Chimera.
- The RMS Mauretania (1906) is remembered in a song, "The fireman's lament" or "Firing the Mauretania", collected by Redd Sullivan. The song starts "In 19 hundred and 24, I ... got a job on the Mauretania"; but then goes on to say "shovelling coal from morn till night" (not possible in 1924 as she was oil-fired by then). The number of "fires" is said to be 64. Hughie Jones also recorded the song but the last verse of Hughie's version calls upon "all you trimmers" whereas Redd Sullivan's version calls upon "stokers". (Note: A stoker shovelled coal into the furnaces of the boilers. A trimmer worked in the coal bunkers, bringing more coal forward as the nearer coal was used by the stokers. A boilerman was a more skilled role, with some responsibility for managing the operation of the boiler.)
