= Edmund Wilson =

American writer and literary critic (1895–1972)

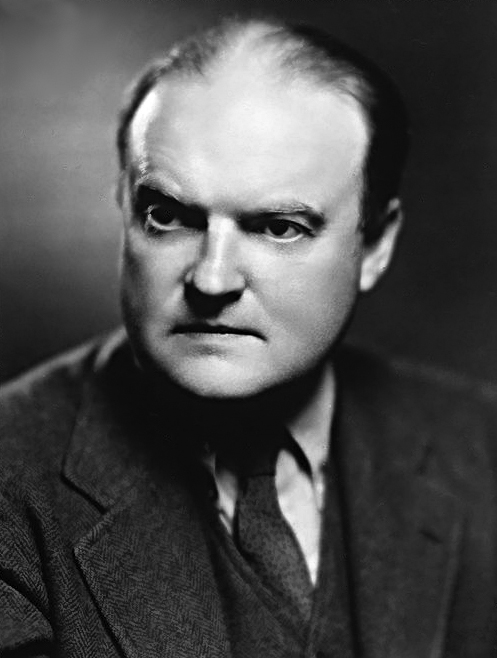
- Wilson in 1936
- Born: Edmund Wilson Jr. May 8, 1895; Red Bank, New Jersey, U.S.
- Died: June 12, 1972 (aged 77); Talcottville, New York, U.S.
- Education: Princeton University
- Occupations: Literary critic; essayist; editor; journalist; writer
- Spouses: Mary Blair (m. 1923; div. 1930) Margaret Canby (m. 1930; died 1932) Mary McCarthy (m. 1938; div. 1946) Elena Thornton (m. 1946)
- Children: 3, including Helen
- Writing career
- Genres: Fiction; review of fiction
- Notable works: Axel's Castle (1931); To the Finland Station (1940); Patriotic Gore (1962)
- Notable awards: Edward MacDowell Medal (1964); National Medal for Literature (1966)

Edmund Wilson Jr. (May 8, 1895 – June 12, 1972) was an American writer, literary critic, and journalist. He is widely regarded as one of the most important literary critics of the 20th century. Wilson began his career as a journalist, writing for publications such as Vanity Fair and The New Yorker. He helped to edit The New Republic, served as chief book critic for The New Yorker, and was a frequent contributor to The New York Review of Books.

His notable works include Axel's Castle (1931), described by Joyce Carol Oates as "a groundbreaking study of modern literature." Oates writes that Wilson "encroached fearlessly on areas reserved for academic 'experts': early Christianity in The Dead Sea Scrolls (1955), native American civilization in Apologies to the Iroquois (1960), and the American Civil War in Patriotic Gore (1962)."

Wilson also authored a novel, I Thought of Daisy (1929) and a collection of short stories, Memoirs of Hecate County (1946). He was a friend of many notable figures, including F. Scott Fitzgerald, Ernest Hemingway, John Dos Passos and Vladimir Nabokov. His dream for a Library of America series of national classic works came to fruition through the efforts of Jason Epstein after Wilson's death. He was a two-time winner of the National Book Award and received the Presidential Medal of Freedom in 1964. He died in 1972 at age 77.

== Early life ==
Wilson was born in Red Bank, New Jersey. His parents were Edmund Wilson Sr., a lawyer who served as New Jersey Attorney General, and Helen Mather (née Kimball). Wilson attended The Hill School, a college preparatory boarding school in Pottstown, Pennsylvania, graduating in 1912. At Hill, Wilson served as the editor-in-chief of the school's literary magazine, The Record.

From 1912 to 1916, he was educated at Princeton University, where his friends included F. Scott Fitzgerald and war poet John Allan Wyeth. Wilson began his professional writing career as a reporter for the New York Sun, and served in the army with Base Hospital 36 from Detroit, Michigan, and later as a translator during the First World War. His family's summer home at Talcottville, New York, known as Edmund Wilson House, was listed on the National Register of Historic Places in 1973.

== Career ==
Wilson was the managing editor of Vanity Fair in 1920 and 1921, and later served as associate editor of The New Republic and as a book reviewer for The New Yorker and The New York Review of Books. His works influenced novelists Upton Sinclair, John Dos Passos, Sinclair Lewis, Floyd Dell, and Theodore Dreiser. He served on the Dewey Commission that set out to fairly evaluate the charges that led to the exile of Leon Trotsky. He wrote plays, poems, and novels, but his greatest influence was literary criticism.

Axel's Castle: A Study in the Imaginative Literature of 1870–1930 (1931) was a sweeping survey of Symbolism. It covered Arthur Rimbaud, Auguste Villiers de l'Isle-Adam (author of Axël), W. B. Yeats, Paul Valéry, T. S. Eliot, Marcel Proust, James Joyce, and Gertrude Stein.

In 1931, monitoring the Coal War in Harlan County, with Mary Heaton Vorse and Malcolm Cowley he was run out of Kentucky by nightriders.

In 1932, Wilson pledged his support to the Communist Party USA's candidate for president, William Z. Foster, signing a manifesto in support of CPUSA policies; however, Wilson did not identify personally as a communist. In his book To the Finland Station (1940), Wilson traced the course of European socialism, from the 1824 discovery by Jules Michelet of the ideas of Vico to the 1917 arrival of Vladimir Lenin at the Finland Station of Saint Petersburg to lead the Bolsheviks in the Russian Revolution.

In an essay on the work of horror writer H. P. Lovecraft, "Tales of the Marvellous and the Ridiculous", Wilson condemned Lovecraft's tales as "hackwork". Wilson is also well known for his heavy criticism of J. R. R. Tolkien's The Lord of the Rings, which he referred to as "juvenile trash", saying "Dr. Tolkien has little skill at narrative and no instinct for literary form." He had earlier dismissed the work of W. Somerset Maugham in vehement terms (without, as he later boasted, having troubled to read the novels generally regarded as Maugham's finest, Of Human Bondage, Cakes and Ale and The Razor's Edge).

In 1964, Wilson was awarded The Edward MacDowell Medal by The MacDowell Colony for outstanding contributions to American culture.

Wilson lobbied for the creation of a series of classic U.S. literature similar to France's Bibliothèque de la Pléiade. In 1982, ten years after his death, The Library of America series was launched. Wilson's writing was included in the Library of America in two volumes published in 2007.

== Peers and relationships ==
Wilson's critical works helped foster public appreciation for several novelists: Ernest Hemingway, John Dos Passos, William Faulkner, F. Scott Fitzgerald, and Vladimir Nabokov. He was instrumental in establishing the modern evaluation of the works of Charles Dickens and Rudyard Kipling. Wilson was a friend of the novelist and playwright Susan Glaspell as well as the philosopher Isaiah Berlin.

He attended Princeton with Fitzgerald, a year-and-a-half his junior. In 1936 in the "Crack-Up" essays, Fitzgerald referred to Wilson as his "intellectual conscience ... [f]or twenty years". After Fitzgerald's early death (at the age of 44) from a heart attack in December 1940, Wilson edited two books by Fitzgerald (The Last Tycoon and The Crack-Up) for posthumous publication, donating his editorial services to help Fitzgerald's family. Wilson was also a friend of Nabokov, with whom he corresponded extensively and whose writing he introduced to Western audiences. However, their friendship was marred by Wilson's cool reaction to Nabokov's Lolita and irretrievably damaged by Wilson's public criticism of what he considered Nabokov's eccentric translation of Pushkin's Eugene Onegin.

Wilson had multiple marriages and affairs.

- His first wife was Mary Blair, who had been in Eugene O'Neill's theatrical company. Their daughter, Rosalind Baker Wilson, was born on September 19, 1923.
- His second wife was Margaret Canby. After her death in a freak accident two years after their marriage, Wilson wrote a long eulogy to her and said later that he felt guilt over having neglected her. Wilson, despondent over Canby's death, moved to a rundown townhouse at 314 East 53rd Street in Manhattan for several years.
- From 1938 to 1946, he was married to Mary McCarthy, who like Wilson was well known as a literary critic. She enormously admired Wilson's breadth and depth of intellect, and they collaborated on numerous works. In an article in The New Yorker, Louis Menand wrote, "The marriage to McCarthy was a mistake that neither side wanted to be first to admit. When they fought, he would retreat into his study and lock the door; she would set piles of paper on fire and try to push them under it." This marriage resulted in the birth of their son, Reuel, on December 25, 1938.
- His fourth wife was Elena Mumm Thornton (previously married to James Worth Thornton). Their daughter, Helen Miranda Wilson, was born February 19, 1948.

He wrote many letters to Anaïs Nin, criticizing her for her surrealistic style, because it was opposed to the realism that was then deemed correct writing, and he ended by asking for her hand — "I would love to be married to you, and I would teach you to write" — which she took as an insult. Except for a brief falling-out following the publication of I Thought of Daisy, in which Wilson portrayed Edna St. Vincent Millay as Rita Cavanaugh, Wilson and Millay remained friends throughout life.

== Cold War ==
Wilson was also an outspoken critic of US Cold War policies. He refused to pay his federal income tax from 1946 to 1955 and was later investigated by the Internal Revenue Service. After a settlement, Wilson received a $25,000 fine, rather than the original $69,000 sought by the IRS. He received no jail time. In his book The Cold War and the Income Tax: A Protest (1963), Wilson argued that as a result of competitive militarization against the Soviet Union, the civil liberties of Americans were being paradoxically infringed under the guise of defense from Communism. For those reasons, Wilson also opposed involvement in the Vietnam War.

Selected by John F. Kennedy to receive the Presidential Medal of Freedom, Wilson, in absentia, was officially awarded the medal on December 6, 1963, by President Lyndon Johnson. However, Wilson's view of Johnson was decidedly negative. Historian Eric F. Goldman writes in his memoir The Tragedy of Lyndon Johnson that when Goldman, on behalf of Johnson, invited Wilson to read from his writings at a White House Festival of the Arts in 1965, "Wilson declined with a brusqueness that I never experienced before or after in the case of an invitation in the name of the President and First Lady."

For the academic year 1964–65, he was a Fellow on the faculty in the Center for Advanced Studies at Wesleyan University.

== "Edmund Wilson regrets..." ==
Throughout his career, Wilson often answered fan mail and outside requests for his time with this form postcard:

Edmund Wilson regrets that it is impossible for him to: Read manuscripts, write articles or books to order, write forewords or introductions, make statements for publicity purposes, do any kind of editorial work, judge literary contests, give interviews, conduct educational courses, deliver lectures, give talks or make speeches, broadcast or appear on television, take part in writers' congresses, answer questionnaires, contribute to or take part in symposiums or 'panels' of any kind, contribute manuscripts for sales, donate copies of his books to libraries, autograph books for strangers, allow his name to be used on letterheads, supply personal information about himself, supply photographs of himself, supply opinions on literary or other subjects.

== Bibliography ==
=== Literary criticism ===
- Axel's Castle: A Study in the Imaginative Literature of 1870–1930, Charles Scribner's Sons, 1931
- The Triple Thinkers: Ten Essays on Literature, Harcourt, Brace & Co, 1938
- The Wound and the Bow: Seven Studies in Literature, Riverside Press, 1941; ebook
- The Boys in the Back Room, Colt Press, 1941
- The Shock of Recognition: The Development of Literature in the U.S. Recorded by the Men Who Made It (editor), Modern Library, 1943, Illustrations (one-volume edition) by Robert F. Hallock
  - Volume I. The Nineteenth Century
  - Volume II. The Twentieth Century
- The Triple Thinkers: Twelve Essays on Literary Subjects, Farrar, Straus & Co., 1948; ebook
- Classics and Commercials: A Literary Chronicle of the Forties, Farrar, Straus & Co, 1950; 1999 pbk edition 2019 ebook edition
- The Shores of Light: A Literary Chronicle of the Twenties and Thirties, Farrar, Straus & Young, 1952
- Eight Essays, Garden City, NY: Doubleday, 1954; 2019 ebook edition
- The Scrolls from the Dead Sea, Fontana, 1955
- Patriotic Gore: Studies in the Literature of the American Civil War, New York, NY: Farrar, Straus and Giroux, 1962
- The Bit Between My Teeth: A Literary Chronicle of 1950–1965, Farrar, Straus and Giroux, 1966
- The Dead Sea Scrolls, 1947–1969, Oxford University Press, 1969 LCCN 75-83505
- Window on Russia: For Use of Foreign Readers, Farrar, Straus and Giroux, 1972
- The Devils and Canon Barham; Ten Essays on Poets, Novelists and Monsters, Farrar, Straus and Giroux, 1973; ebook
- The Portable Edmund Wilson, ed. Lewis M. Dabney, Viking Press, 1983
- The Forties: From Notebooks and Diaries of the Period, ed. Leon Edel, Farrar, Straus & Giroux, 1983; ebook
- From the Uncollected Edmund Wilson, ed. Janet Groth, Ohio University Press, 1995
- The Edmund Wilson Reader, ed. Lewis M. Dabney, Da Capo Press, 1997 LCCN 97-22105 ISBN 0306808099
- Literary Essays and Reviews of the 1920s & 30s: The Shores of Light, Axel's Castle, Uncollected Reviews ed. Lewis M. Dabney, Library of America, 2007
- Literary Essays and Reviews of the 1930s & 40s: The Triple Thinkers, The Wound and the Bow, Classics and Commercials, Uncollected Reviews, ed. Lewis M. Dabney, Library of America, 2007

=== Political writings ===
- The American Jitters: A Year of the Slump, Charles Scribner's Sons, 1932
- The Undertaker's Garland (with John Peale Bishop), Alfred A. Knopf, 1922
- Travels In Two Democracies, Harcourt Brace, 1936
- To the Finland Station: A Study in the Writing and Acting of History, Doubleday, 1940
- Europe without Baedeker: Sketches among the Ruins of Italy, Greece and England, 1947
- Red, Black, Blond, and Olive: Studies in Four Civilizations: Zuni, Haiti, Soviet Russia, Israel, Oxford University Press, 1956
- The American Earthquake: A Documentary of the Twenties and Thirties (A Documentary of the Jazz Age, the Great Depression, and the New Deal), Doubleday, 1958
- Apologies to the Iroquois, Vintage, 1960
- The Cold War and the Income Tax: A protest, Farrar, Straus & Co., 1964
- O Canada: An American's Notes on Canadian Culture, Farrar, Straus & Co., 1965
- Letters on Literature and Politics, ed. Elena Wilson, Farrar, Straus and Giroux, 1977

=== Poetry ===
- Poets, Farewell!, Charles Scribners's Sons, 1929
- Night Thoughts, Farrar, Straus and Cudahy, 1961

=== Memoirs and diaries ===
- A Piece of My Mind: Reflections at Sixty, Farrar, Straus & Cudahy, 1956
- A Prelude: Landscapes, characters and conversations from the earlier years of my life, Farrar, Straus and Giroux, 1967
- Upstate: Records and Recollections of Northern New York, Farrar, Straus and Giroux, 1971
- The Twenties: From Notebooks and Diaries of the Period, ed. Leon Edel, Farrar, Straus and Giroux, 1975
- The Thirties: From Notebooks and Diaries of the Period, ed. Leon Edel, Farrar, Straus and Giroux, 1980
- The Forties: From Notebooks and Diaries of the Period, ed. Leon Edel, Farrar, Straus and Giroux, 1983
- The Fifties: From Notebooks and Diaries of the Period, ed. Leon Edel, Farrar, Straus and Giroux, 1986
- The Sixties: The Last Journal 1960–1972, ed. Lewis M. Dabney, Farrar, Straus and Giroux, 1993
- Edmund Wilson: The Man in Letters, ed. Janet Groth, Ohio University Press, 2001
- Dear Bunny, Dear Volodya: The Nabokov-Wilson Letters, 1940-1971, ed. Simon Karlinsky, University of California Press, 1979, revised and expanded 2001

=== Fiction ===
- "Galahad", 1927 (short story)
- I Thought of Daisy, 1929 (novel)
- Memoirs of Hecate County, Doubleday, 1946 (short stories)

=== Plays ===
- Cyprian's Prayer 1924
- The Crime in the Whispering Room 1927
- This Room and This Gin and These Sandwiches 1937 (original title "A Winter in Beech Street")
- Beppo and Beth 1937
- The Little Blue Light 1950
- Five Plays 1954 collects Cyprian's Prayer, The Crime in the Whispering Room, This Room and This Gin and These Sandwiches, Beppo and Beth, and The Little Blue Light.
- Dr. McGrath 1967
- The Duke of Palermo 1969
- Osbert's Career, or the Poet's Progress 1969

== Sources ==
- Presidential Medal of Freedom, John F. Kennedy Presidential Library & Museum, archived from the original on August 16, 2009.
