= Andrew Hartman =

American historian

- Occupations: Historian, author, and academic

Academic background
- Education: University of New Mexico; George Washington University

Andrew Hartman is an American historian, author, and academic. He is a professor of history in the College of Arts and Sciences at Illinois State University.

Hartman's research interests span the fields of United States cultural, intellectual, and political history as well as the philosophy of history, pedagogy, and historiography. He has authored books including Education and the Cold War: The Battle for the American School and A War for the Soul of America: A History of the Culture Wars and has also published several articles and monographs. Along with Raymond Haberski Jr., Hartman co-edited American Labyrinth: Intellectual History for Complicated Times. He is the Founding President of the Society for U.S. Intellectual History (S-USIH), and he is an Editorial Advisor for the University of Chicago Press.

== Early life and education ==
After completing his early education, he enrolled at the University of New Mexico and graduated with a major in history in 1994. He then earned a teacher certification in social science education from Metropolitan State College Denver in 1999 and a master's degree from the George Washington University in 2003. He completed his PhD in history from the George Washington University, under the supervision of Leo P. Ribuffo and assisted in publishing Ribuffo's unfinished book, The Limits of Moderation: Jimmy Carter and the Ironies of American Liberalism.

== Career ==
Hartman began his academic career as a Teacher of History and Social Sciences at Thornton High School in the Denver area in 1999 and was appointed as a Graduate Teaching Assistant at George Washington University in 2002. Later in 2006, he held an appointment as an assistant professor of US History at Illinois State University and was promoted to associate professor in 2011. From 2013 to 2014, he was Fulbright Distinguished Chair of American Studies at the University of Southern Denmark in Odense. He has also been a Distinguished Lecturer at the Organization of American Historians from 2015 until 2021. Since 2016, he has been serving as the Professor of History in the College of Arts and Sciences at the Illinois State University.

Hartman co-hosts a podcast about intellectual history, Trotsky and the Wild Orchids, and the Newberry scholarly seminar on the ‘’History of Capitalism’’.

== Research ==
Hartman's research has focused on the history of the United States, particularly on the topics of conservatism, cultural history, intellectual history, the history of education, and Karl Marx and Marxism. He has authored book chapters, monographs, and several peer-reviewed articles

He is the recipient of Fulbright award to conduct research at the British Library. In 2020, he was named the Outstanding University Researcher at Illinois State University.

=== Cultural conservatism ===
Hartman has worked on the history of the culture wars in America, with a particular emphasis on the ways in which conservative ideas have been disseminated and popularized in American culture. In his book, A War for the Soul of America: A History of the Culture Wars he explained the significance of America's struggle over the unprecedented social changes since the 1960s. He further highlighted the emergence of social issues like homosexuality, abortion, and feminism and the politicization of these issues among conservative Americans.

Reviewer Jonathan Bartho commended the book for capturing several crucial historical and social phenomena, and remarked that "A War for the Soul of America is an excellent exploration of many aspects of the culture wars. It is particularly enlightening in the way it demonstrates that each of the major battlegrounds were highly resonant issues". Timothy Lacy acknowledged this book for providing a new perspective to the history of the culture wars and noted that "Hartman’s provocative framing of the Culture Wars squares an objective synthesis of the characters and issues of the period. His objects of study are not unfamiliar to historians of the period, but Hartman’s narrative changes the direction of past scholarship."

=== Education ===
Hartman's work on US history has provided particular insights into the post-war as well as recent educational changes. He examined the educational history of the post-war era and also described the genealogy of progressive education in his book, Education and the Cold War: The Battle for the American School. Mary Lopez expressed her admiration for the comprehensiveness of this book and stated "Hartman’s work provides an impressive chronicling of the many strains of educational theory and conflict that have shaped American education through much of the twentieth century". Thomas Fiala and Deborah Duncan-Owens praised the book in their review, stating that Hartman "takes on the daunting task of unpacking the complex milieu of social, political, and economic factors influencing education during this period."

In Hartman's early research, he investigated various factors that influenced the development of federal social policies for children and suggested its outcomes in the near future. Having elucidated the impacts of curriculum wars in American history and highlighted their consequences on the development of national identity, he analyzed the impact of neoliberalism on the humanities and described several challenges it poses to the curriculum of American culture. Furthermore, he discussed the study of whiteness in the United States, highlighting its increasing importance in academic disciplines, as well as the critique that researchers examining this area have encountered.

=== Reception of Karl Marx ===
Some of Hartman's scholarship has focused on the American reception of Karl Marx. His interests in Karl Marx have led him to research about the history of the American left, with a book chapter titled, "Against the Liberal Tradition: An Intellectual History of the American Left". He has also contributed to efforts to understand the contemporary left, with an article in the Washington Post about the popular podcast, Chapo Trap House, “The Millennial Left’s War Against Liberalism.” His research about Karl Marx and the American reception of Marx led him to write two articles on the occasion of Marx's 200th birthday in 2018: "Marx at 200: Just Getting Started," and "Marx’s America." He has also written about the resonances between Marxism and conservative libertarianism, in an article titled, "The Master Class on the Make.' He is also the author of a book chapter, "Rethinking Karl Marx: American Liberalism from the New Deal to the Cold War," which argues that the success of New Deal liberalism had as much to do with limiting the favorable reception of Marx in the postwar era as did the Red Scare.

== Bibliography ==
=== Books ===
- Education and the Cold War: The Battle for the American School (2008) ISBN 978-0-230-33897-5
- A War for the Soul of America: A History of the Culture Wars (2015) ISBN 978-0-226-37923-4
- American Labyrinth: Intellectual History for Complicated Times, co-editor (2018) ISBN 978-1501730214
- Karl Marx in America (2025) ISBN 978-0-226-53748-1

=== Selected articles ===
- Hartman, Andrew (June 2002). "'The red template': Us policy in Soviet-occupied Afghanistan". Third World Quarterly. 23 (3): 467–489. doi:10.1080/01436590220138439. S2CID 153553051.
- Hartman, Andrew (June 2003). "The social production of American identity: Standardized testing reform in the United States". Socialism and Democracy. 17 (2): 131–164. doi:10.1080/08854300308428369. S2CID 144466747.
- Hartman, Andrew (October 2004). "The rise and fall of whiteness studies". Race & Class. 46 (2): 22–38. doi:10.1177/0306396804047723. S2CID 145215277.
- Hartman, Andrew (December 2009). "Christopher Lasch: Critic of liberalism, historian of its discontents". Rethinking History. 13 (4): 499–519. doi:10.1080/13642520903293110. S2CID 144117178.
- Hartman, Andrew (January 2013). "'A Trojan Horse for Social Engineering': The Curriculum Wars in Recent American History". Journal of Policy History. 25 (1): 114–136. doi:10.1017/S0898030612000371. S2CID 153859601.
- Hartman, Andrew (2015). "The Internationalization of the US History Curriculum". The American Historian. 3: 39–42.
- Hartman, Andrew (Spring 2017). "Culture Wars and the Humanities in the Age of Neoliberalism". Raritan. 36 (4): 128–140, 170. ProQuest 1913309364.
- Hartman, Andrew (2018). "AGAINST THE LIBERAL TRADITION an Intellectual History of the American Left". American Labyrinth. Cornell University Press. pp. 132–145. doi:10.7591/9781501730221-010. ISBN 978-1-5017-3022-1. JSTOR 10.7591/j.ctt21h4w2k.12. S2CID 166508993.
- Hartman, Andrew (2021). "Rethinking Karl Marx". In Phelps, Christopher; Vandome, Robin (eds.). Marxism and America. pp. 119–143. doi:10.7765/9781526149770.00012. ISBN 978-1-5261-4977-0. S2CID 240578228.
