= Lakhta =

Lakhta (Russian: Лахта) may refer to:

- Lake Lakhta, or Lakhtinsky Razliv, a lake or inlet of the Neva Bay
- Lakhta, Saint Petersburg, a historical area of Saint Petersburg, Russia
- Lakhta Center, a skyscraper in Saint Petersburg, Russia
- Lakhta air base, an air base near Arkhangelsk, Russia
- Lakhta (rural locality), several rural localities in Russia
- Project Lakhta, a Russian information warfare operation

== See also ==
- Lahti, a city in Finland
- Lakhta-Olgino Municipal Okrug, a municipal okrug of Primorsky District in St. Petersburg, Russia
