= Internet Research Agency =

Former Russian company engaged in online propaganda

- Агентство интернет-исследований
- Formation: 26 July 2013
- Founder: Yevgeny Prigozhin
- Dissolved: 1 July 2023
- Purpose: Internet manipulation, spreading disinformation
- Headquarters: Olgino
- Location: Saint Petersburg, Russia

The Internet Research Agency (IRA; Russian: Агентство интернет-исследований, romanized: Agentstvo internet-issledovaniy; 2013–2023), also known as Glavset (Russian: Главсеть, lit. 'Central Network'), and known in Russian Internet slang as the Trolls from Olgino (ольгинские тролли, olginskiye trolli) or Kremlinbots (кремлеботы), was a Russian company which was engaged in online propaganda and influence operations on behalf of Russian business and political interests. It was linked to Yevgeny Prigozhin, a former Russian oligarch who was leader of the Wagner Group, and based in Saint Petersburg.

The agency was first mentioned in a 2015 article by Adrian Chen in The New York Times, which detailed its operations, although it gained further attention when Russian journalist Andrey Zakharov published his investigation into Prigozhin’s "troll factory". The January 2017 report issued by the United States Intelligence Community—Assessing Russian Activities and Intentions in Recent US Elections—described the agency as a troll farm: "The likely financier of the so-called Internet Research Agency of professional trolls located in Saint Petersburg is a close ally of [Vladimir] Putin with ties to Russian intelligence," commenting that "they previously were devoted to supporting Russian actions in Ukraine—[and] started to advocate for candidate Trump as early as December 2015."

The agency employed fake accounts registered on major social networking sites, discussion boards, online newspaper sites, and video hosting services to promote the Kremlin's interests in domestic and foreign policy including Ukraine and the Middle East as well as attempting to influence the 2016 United States presidential election. More than 1,000 employees reportedly worked in a single building of the organization in 2015.

The extent to which the organization tried to influence public opinion using social media became better known after a June 2014 BuzzFeed News article greatly expanded on government documents published by hackers earlier that year. The Internet Research Agency gained more attention by June 2015, when one of its offices was reported as having data from fake accounts used for biased Internet trolling. Subsequently, there were news reports of individuals receiving monetary compensation for performing these tasks.

On 16 February 2018, a United States grand jury indicted 13 Russian nationals and three Russian entities, including the Internet Research Agency, on charges of violating criminal laws with the intent to interfere "with U.S. elections and political processes", according to the Justice Department. On 1 July 2023, it was announced that the Internet Research Agency would be shut down following the aftermath of the Wagner Group rebellion.

== Origin ==
In Leningrad Oblast in the late 1970s, Vladimir Putin's first KGB post was with the 5th Department, which countered dissidents with disinformation using active measures, and was strongly supported by Filipp Bobkov and the head of the KGB Yuri Andropov, who believed in "stamping out dissent".

Revealed on 16 August 2012 in an article by the Russian edition of Forbes magazine, the website for the company Medialogia (Note: Medialogia (Russian: «Медиалогия») was a project began in 2003 of the software development company IBS but, later, was an independent business separate from IBS. (Note: In 2014, software systems for monitoring social media networks purchased by the Russian Ministry of Internal Affairs (MVD) from Medialogia include the Prizma information and analytical systems, the GLASS News Terminal, Medialogy and the Medialogy-Government Procurement system (Russian: «Призма», «Новостного терминала ГЛАСС», «Медиалогии» и системы «Медиалогия-госзакупки»). "Prism" targets main "news events, trends, information attacks, and anomalous activity" in blogs and social networks in real time and identifies the primary sources of information dissemination. Senior officials and the Russian presidential administration monitor social networks using Prisma. "Prism" identifies sites on the network which are intended to organize information attacks including fake sites that can be used to misinform users and information attacks organized by botnets and predicts information attacks, threats, etc. The GLASS News Terminal system aggregates data from main events of the day, negative and positive materials about the MVD and its leadership, criticism of MVD employees, authorities, opposition protests, etc. The Main Center for Communications and Information Security (Russian: Главный центр связи и информационной безопасности) in the MVD stated that the users of these products are the Minister of Internal Affairs, his deputies, heads of main directorates, directorates and departments of the Ministry of Internal Affairs, as well as employees of the Department of Internal Affairs of the Ministry of Internal Affairs and employees of other divisions of the central apparatus of the Ministry of Internal Affairs.)) offered a system known as Prisma terminals (Russian: Терминалы «Призма») which, according to Farit Khusnoyarov, (Note: Farit Khusnoyarov (Russian: Фарит Хуснояров) was the development director of Medialogia in 2012 and was the Deputy Minister of Public Administration, Information Technology and Communications of the Moscow Region in 2015.) Prism could track for the Kremlin in near real time the stand-alone blog platforms and social networks of nearly 60 million sites and could analyze the tone of the statements of each of these sources with a lag of several minutes or given as an estimated error of 2–3% almost in real time. The article called the terminals Volodin's Prism (Russian: Призма Володина) for Vyacheslav Volodin. (Note: From 21 October 2010 to 2012, Vyacheslav Volodin was the Deputy Chairman of Government as the Deputy Prime Minister to Dmitry Medvedev replacing Sergey Sobyanin who had been Chief of Staff of the Presidential Executive Office under Vladimir Putin. Volodin was the First deputy Chief of Staff of the Presidential Administration of Russia under Medvedev from 2012 to 2016.) After the Snow revolution following the 4 December 2011 Russian legislative elections, Volodin actively used his Prism terminal, which he received on the eve of the elections, to counter dissidents in Russia. Others using Prisma include Sergei Naryshkin's office in the State Duma, senior officials at the Main Center for Communications and Information Security (Russian: Главный центр связи и информационной безопасности) in the Russian Ministry of Internal Affairs (MVD) (Note: The Russian Ministry of Internal Affairs (MVD) was headed by Rashid Nurgaliyev under Putin until 21 May 2012 when Vladimir Kolokoltsev assumed the post.) senior officials at Moscow City Hall (Note: Senior officials at the Moscow City Hall include Vladimir Kolokoltsev who headed the MVD for the Moscow region from 7 September 2009 to 21 May 2012. From October 2012, the Moscow City Hall was under leadership of the Mayor of Moscow Sergey Sobyanin.) and employees close to the head of Rosneft Igor Sechin. (Note: In 2012, other monitoring systems for social media in Russia included Kribrum (Russian: «Крибрум») from the Natalya Kaspersky company InfoWatch and the Igor Ashmanov firm Ashmanov & Partners (Russian: Infowatch и «Ашманов и партнеры») and Wobot from former employees of Medialogia, the Public Opinion Foundation and VimpelCom (Russian: бывшие сотрудники «Медиалогии», фонда «Общественное мнение» и «Вымпелкома»).) (Note: Oleg Vladimirovich Feoktistov (Russian: Олег Владимирович Феоктистов; born 3 July 1964, Moscow Oblast), also known as "Oleg the Big" or "General Fix" or "General Ficus", served as a border guard in Karelia with Ivan Ivanovich Tkachev (Russian: Иван Иванович Ткачёв; born 1970), who later would head the "K" Directorate of the SEB of the FSB beginning in 2016 after the resignation of Viktor Voronin (Russian: Виктор Воронин), and fought with the Soviet Army during the Soviet–Afghan War where he met the KGB military counterintelligence officer Sergei Shishin, who later became the head of the special forces of the FSB CSS, and then the head of the FSB Economic Support Service. Shishin guided Feoktistov but became embroiled in scandals during 2007 after which Shishin transferred to the Office of seconded employees, then seconded to VTB Bank, and three years later he joined the management of RusHydro and the Igor Sechin associated Rosneft. Feoktistov graduated from the FSB Academy and, in 2004, headed the newly formed FSB's Internal Security Directorate also known as the 6th Service or CSS (Russian: «Шестерка») of the FSB, which is responsible for the operational support of criminal cases and The New Times called "Sechin's Special Forces" because it was created on an initiative of Igor Sechin while Igor Sechin was the deputy head of the presidential administration. In September 2016, Feoktistov officially became the head of the security service of Rosneft.)

The Internet Research Agency was founded in mid-2013. In 2013, Novaya Gazeta newspaper reported that Internet Research Agency Ltd's office was in Olgino, a historic district of Saint Petersburg.

Uncovered by Anonymous International and made public in June 2014, Vyacheslav Volodin is a strong supporter of the interests of Yevgeny Prigozhin and the trolls at the Internet Research Agency.

The terms "Trolls from Olgino" and "Olgino's trolls" (Russian: "Тролли из Ольгино", "Ольгинские тролли") have become general terms denoting trolls who spread pro-Russian propaganda, not only necessarily those based at the office in Olgino.

Information of the work being conducted at the Agency comes in part from interviews with former employees.

In February 2023, Yevgeny Prigozhin, the head of the private military company Wagner Group, stated that he founded the IRA: "I’ve never just been the financier of the Internet Research Agency. I invented it, I created it, I managed it for a long time." The admission came months after Prigozhin had admitted to Russian interference in U.S. elections.

== Organizers ==
=== Strategic ===
Russian newspaper Vedomosti links the approved-by-Russian-authorities strategy of public consciousness manipulation through new media to Vyacheslav Volodin, first deputy of the Vladimir Putin Presidential Administration of Russia.

=== Tactical ===
External videos
- Why are Russian trolls spreading online hoaxes in the U.S.?, PBS News Hour (PBS is funded by member station dues, the Corporation for Public Broadcasting, corporate contributions, pledge drives, foundations and individual citizens.), 8 June 2015

Journalists have written that Alexey Soskovets, who had participated in the Russian youth political community, was directly connected to the office in Olgino, and that his company, North-Western Service Agency, won 17 or 18 (according to different sources) contracts for organizing celebrations, forums and sport competitions for authorities of Saint Petersburg and that Soskovets' company was the only participant in half of those bids. In mid-2013 the agency won a tender for providing freight services for participants of Seliger camp.

In 2014, according to Russian media, Internet Research Ltd. (Russian: Интернет исследования, romanized: Internet issledovaniya) was founded in March 2014, and joined IRA's activity. The newspaper Novaya Gazeta reported that this company is a successor of Internet Research Agency Ltd. Internet Research Ltd. is considered to be linked to Yevgeny Prigozhin, head of the holding company Concord Management and Consulting. The "Trolls of Olgino" are considered to be his project. As of October 2014, the company belonged to Mikhail Bystrov, who had been the head of the police station at Moscow district of Saint Petersburg.

Russian media point out that according to documents, published by hackers from Anonymous International, Concord Management is directly involved with trolling administration through the agency. Researchers cite e-mail correspondence, in which Concord Management gives instructions to trolls and receives reports on accomplished work. According to journalists, Concord Management organized banquets in the Kremlin and also cooperated with Voentorg and the Russian Ministry of Defence.

Despite links to Alexei Soskovets, Nadejda Orlova, deputy head of the Committee for Youth Policy in Saint Petersburg, disputed a connection between her institution and the trolling offices.

Finnish journalist Jessikka Aro, who reported extensively on the pro-Russian trolling activities in Finland, was targeted by an organized campaign of hate, disinformation and harassment.

== Offices ==
=== Saint Petersburg ===
==== 2013: 131 Primorskoye Shosse, Olgino, Saint Petersburg ====
59°59′42.7″N 30°07′49.7″E

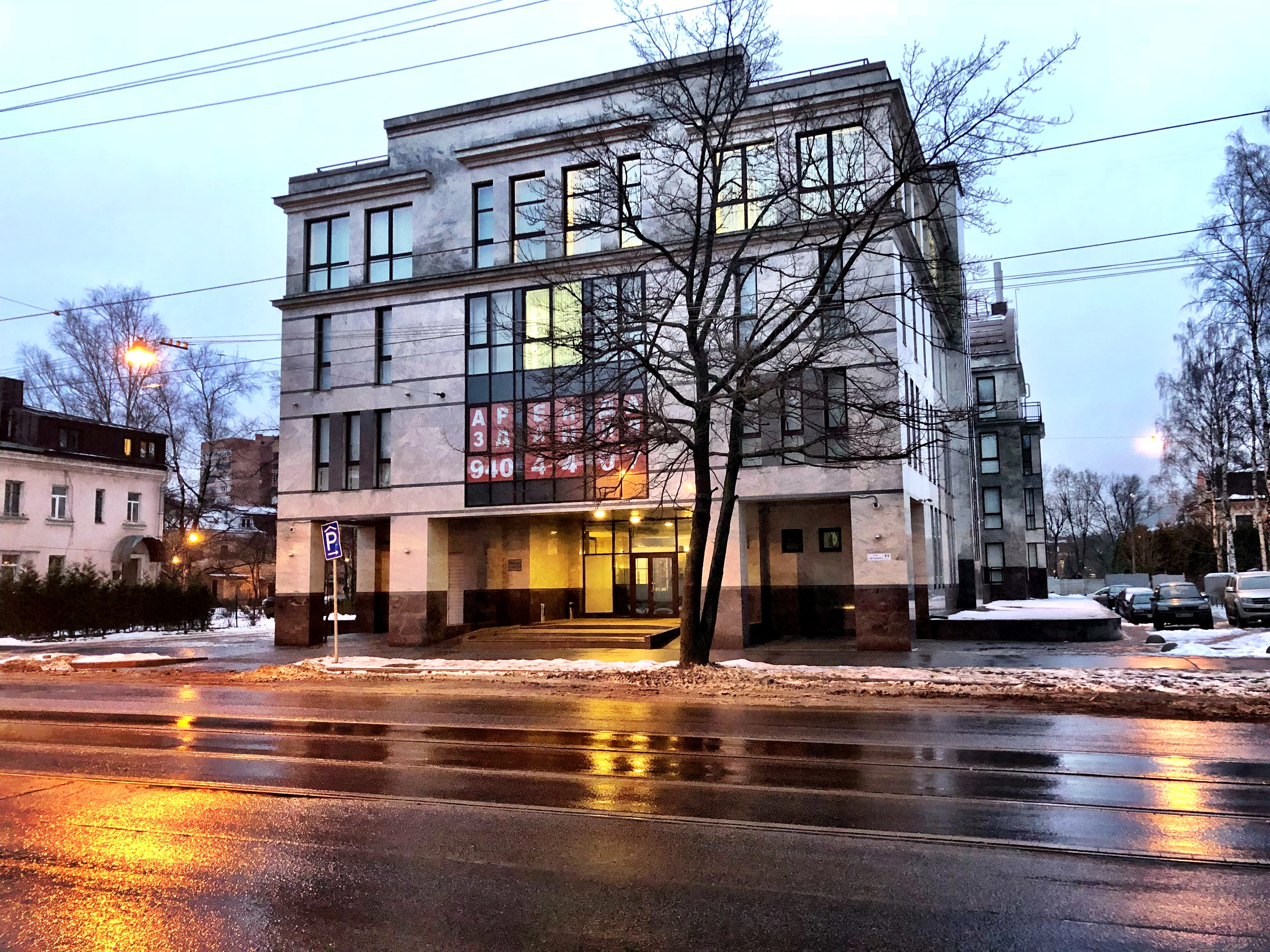
One of the offices at 55 Savushkina Street in Saint Petersburg, Russia

As reported by Novaya Gazeta, in the end of August 2013, the following message appeared in social networks: "Internet operators wanted! Job at chic office in Olgino!!! (st. Staraya Derevnia), salary 25960 per month (USD$780 as of 2013). Task: posting comments at profile sites in the Internet, writing thematic posts, blogs, social networks. Reports via screenshots. Individual schedule [...] Payment every week, 1180 per shift (from 8.00 to 16.00, from 10.30 to 18.30, from 14.00 to 22.00). PAYMENTS EVERY WEEK AND FREE MEALS!!! Official job placement or according to contract (at will). Tuition possible."

As reported by media and former employees, the office in Olgino, Primorskiy district, St. Peterburg had existed and had been functioning since September 2013. It was situated in a white cottage, 15 minutes by an underground railway from Staraya Derevnia station, opposite Olgino railway station. Workplaces for troll-employees were placed in basement rooms.

==== 2014: 55 Ulitsa Savushkina (Street), Saint Petersburg ====
59°59′03.5″N 30°16′19.1″E

According to Russian online newspaper DP.ru, several months before October 2014 the office moved from Olgino to a four-story building at 55 Savushkina Street, Primorskiy district, St. Peterburg. As reported by journalists, the building is officially an uncompleted construction and stayed as such as of March 2015.

A New York Times investigative reporter was told that the Internet Research Agency had shortened its name to "Internet Research," and as of June 2015 had been asked to leave the 55 Savushkina Street location "a couple of months ago" because "it was giving the entire building a bad reputation." A possibly related organization, FAN or Federal News Agency, was located in the building. The New York Times article describes various experiences reported by former employees of the Internet Research Agency at the Savushkina Street location. It also describes several disruptive hoaxes in the US and Europe, such as the Columbian Chemicals Plant explosion hoax, that may be attributable to the Internet Research Agency or similar Russian-based organizations.

==== 1 February 2018: Optikov street, 4, building 3, Lakhta-2 business center, Lakhta, Saint Petersburg ====
59°59′41.5068″N 30°14′44.4588″E

Reported by the Russian online newspaper DP.ru in December 2017, the office moved from the four-story building at 55 Savushkina Street to Lakhta on four floors at Optikov street, 4 building 3 (Russian: Санкт-Петербург: улица Оптикова, 4 корпус 3) near Staroderevenskaya street (Russian: Стародеревенская улица) in the Lakhta-2 business center (Russian: «Лахта-2») on 1 February 2018. Beginning in February 2018, they were also known as the "Lakhta Trolls" (Russian: Лахта Тролли).

=== Other locations and associated groups ===
Novaya Gazeta reported that, according to Alexey Soskovets, head of the office in Olgino, North-Western Service Agency was hiring employees for similar projects in Moscow and other cities in 2013.

In 2024, an investigation by several media outlets revealed documents leaked from "Agency of Social Design" which played a key role in a series of mass-scale disinformation campaigns, producing nearly 40,000 content units (memes, images, comments) over 4 months, used in specific campaigns targeted at governments of France, Poland, Germany and Ukraine.

== Work organization ==
More than 1,000 paid bloggers and commenters reportedly worked only in a single building at Savushkina Street in 2015. Many other employees work remotely. According to BuzzFeed News, more than 600 people were generally employed in the trolls' office earlier, in June 2014. Each commentator has a daily quota of 100 comments.

Trolls took shifts writing mainly in blogs on LiveJournal and Vkontakte, about subjects along the propaganda lines assigned. Included among the employees are artists who draw political cartoons. They work for 12 hours every other two days. A blogger's quota is ten posts per shift, each post at least 750 characters. A commenter's norm is 126 comments and two posts per account. Each blogger is in charge of three accounts.

Employees at the Olgino office earned 25,000 Russian rubles per month (at the time roughly US$651.41); those at the Savushkina Street office earned approximately 40,000 Russian rubles. In May 2014, Fontanka.ru described schemes for plundering the federal budget, intended to go toward the trolling organization. In 2017 another whistleblower said that with bonuses and long working hours the salary can reach 80,000 rubles.

An employee interviewed by The Washington Post described the work:

I immediately felt like a character in the book 1984 by George Orwell — a place where you have to write that white is black and black is white. Your first feeling, when you ended up there, was that you were in some kind of factory that turned lying, telling untruths, into an industrial assembly line.

According to a 2018 Kommersant article, Yaroslov Ignatovsky (Russian: Ярослав Ринатович Игнатовский; born 1983, Leningrad) heads Politgen (Russian: "Политген") and is a political strategist that has coordinated the trolls' efforts for Prigozhin.

== Trolling themes ==
According to the testimonies of the investigative journalists and former employees of the offices, the main topics for posts included:

- Criticism of Alexei Navalny, his sponsors, and Russian opposition in general;
- Criticism of Ukraine's and the United States' foreign policies, and of the top politicians of these states;
- Praise for Vladimir Putin and the policy of the Russian Federation;
- Praise for and defense of Bashar al-Assad.

The IRA has also leveraged trolls to erode trust in American political and media institutions and showcase certain politicians as incompetent. Journalists have written that themes of trolling were consistent with those of other Russian propaganda outlets in topics and timing. Technical points used by trolls were taken mainly from content disseminated by RT (formerly Russia Today).

A 2015 BBC News investigation identified the Olgino factory as the most likely producer of a September 2015 "Saiga 410K review" video where an actor posing as a U.S. soldier shoots at a book that turns out to be a Quran, which sparked outrage. BBC News found among other irregularities that the soldier's uniform is not used by the U.S. military and is easily purchased in Russia, and that the actor filmed was most likely a bartender from Saint Petersburg related to a troll factory employee.

The citizen-journalism site Bellingcat identified the team from Olgino as the real authors of a video attributed to the Azov Battalion in which masked soldiers threaten the Netherlands for organizing the referendum on the Ukraine–European Union Association Agreement.

== Organized anti-Ukrainian campaign ==
In the beginning of April 2014 there began an organized online campaign to shift public opinion in the Western world in a way that would be useful for Russian authorities regarding the Russian military intervention in Ukraine in 2014. Hacked and leaked documents from that time contain instructions for commenters posting at the websites of Fox News, The Huffington Post, TheBlaze, Politico, and WorldNetDaily. The requirement for the working hours for the trolls is also mentioned: 50 comments under news articles per day. Each blogger had to manage six accounts on Facebook, post at least three posts every day, and participate twice in the group discussions. Other employees had to manage 10 accounts on Twitter, publishing 50 tweets every day. Journalists concluded that Igor Osadchiy was a probable leader of the project, and the campaign itself was run by Internet Research Agency Ltd. Osadchiy denied his connection to the agency.

The company was also one of the main sponsors of an anti-Western exhibition Material Evidence.

In the beginning of 2016, Ukraine's state-owned news agency Ukrinform claimed to expose a system of bots in social networks, which called for violence against the Ukrainian government and for starting "The Third Maidan". (Note: "Maidan" refers to Independence Square in Kyiv, which became synonymous with mass political protests following the 2004 Orange Revolution and the 2013 Euromaidan, i.e. the two Maidans.) They reported that the organizer of this system is the former anti-Ukrainian combatant Sergiy Zhuk from Donbas. He allegedly performed his Internet activity from Vnukovo District in Moscow.

== Reactions ==
=== Foreign ===
In March 2014, the Polish edition of Newsweek expressed suspicion that Russia was employing people to "bombard" its website with pro-Russian comments on Ukraine-related articles. Poland's governmental computer emergency response team later confirmed that pro-Russia commentary had flooded Polish Internet portals at the start of the Russo-Ukrainian War. German-language media websites were also flooded with pro-Russia comments in the spring of 2014.

In late May 2014, the hacker group Anonymous International began publishing documents received from hacked emails of Internet Research Agency managers.

In May–June 2014, Internet trolls invaded news media sites and massively posted pro-Russian comments in broken English.

In March 2015 a service enabling censorship of sources of anti-Ukrainian propaganda in social networks inside Ukraine was launched.

The United States Justice Department announced the indictment on 16 February 2018, of the Internet Research Agency while also naming more than a dozen individual suspects who allegedly worked there as part of the special counsel's investigation into criminal interference with the 2016 election.

== Assessments ==
Russian bloggers Anton Nosik, Rustem Adagamov, and Dmitriy Aleshkovskiy have said that paid Internet-trolls don't change public opinion. Their usage is just a way to steal budget money.

Leonid Volkov, a politician working for Alexei Navalny's Anti-Corruption Foundation, suggests that the point of sponsoring paid Internet trolling is to make the Internet so distasteful that ordinary people are not willing to participate.

According to a 2019 report by Oxford researchers including sociologist Philip N. Howard, social media played a major role in political polarization in the United States, due to computational propaganda – "the use of automation, algorithms, and big-data analytics to manipulate public life"—such as the spread of fake news and conspiracy theories. The researchers highlighted the role of the Russian Internet Research Agency in attempts to undermine democracy in the US and exacerbate existing political divisions. The most prominent methods of misinformation were "organic posting, not advertisements", and influence operation activity increased after the 2016 and was not limited to the 2016 election. Examples of efforts included "campaigning for African American voters to boycott elections or follow the wrong voting procedures in 2016", "encouraging extreme right-wing voters to be more confrontational", and "spreading sensationalist, conspiratorial, and other forms of junk political news and misinformation to voters across the political spectrum."

The political scientist Thomas Rid has said that the IRA was the least effective of all Russia's interference campaigns in the 2016 U.S. election, despite its outsized press coverage, and that it made no measurable impact on American voters.

A study published in Nature in 2023 found "no evidence of a meaningful relationship between exposure to the Russian foreign influence campaign and changes in attitudes, polarization, or voting behavior".

== Additional activities of organizers ==
Based on the documents published by Anonymous International, Concord Management and Consulting was linked to the funding of several media outlets in Ukraine and Russia, including Kharkiv News Agency, News of Neva, Newspaper About Newspapers, Business Dialog, and Journalist Truth.

The Columbian Chemicals Plant explosion hoax of 11 September 2014, which claimed an explosion had taken place at a chemical plant in Centerville, St. Mary Parish, Louisiana, has been attributed in June 2015, by The New York Times Magazine, as "a highly coordinated disinformation campaign" and that the "virtual assault" was the work of the Internet Research Agency.

Three months later, the same accounts posted false messages on Twitter about an Ebola outbreak in Atlanta under the keyword #EbolaInAtlanta, quickly relayed and picked up by users living in the city. A video was then posted on YouTube, showing a medical team treating an alleged Ebola victim at Atlanta Airport. On the same day, a different group launched a rumor on Twitter under the keyword #shockingmurderinatlanta, reporting the death of a disarmed black woman shot by police. Again, a blurry and poorly filmed video is broadcast to support the rumor.

Between July 2014 and September 2017, the IRA used bots and trolls on Twitter to sow discord about the safety of vaccines. The campaign used sophisticated Twitter bots to amplify highly polarizing pro-vaccine and anti-vaccine messages containing the hashtag #VaccinateUS. In November 2017, The Guardian cited a University of Edinburgh study which found that hundreds of IRA accounts were also trying to influence UK politics by tweeting about Brexit.

In September 2017 Facebook said that ads had been "geographically targeted". Facebook revealed that during the 2016 United States presidential election, IRA had purchased advertisements on the website for US$100,000, 25% of which were geographically targeted to the U.S. Facebook's chief security officer said that the ads "appeared to focus on amplifying divisive social and political messages across the ideological spectrum".

In reviewing the ads buys, we have found approximately $100,000 in ad spending from June of 2015 to May of 2017 – associated with roughly 3,000 ads – that was connected to about 470 inauthentic accounts and Pages in violation of our policies. Our analysis suggests these accounts and Pages were affiliated with one another and likely operated out of Russia.

— Facebook's chief security officer Alex Stamos, September 6, 2017,

According to a 17 October 2017 BuzzFeed News report, IRA recruited four African-American activists into taking real action via protests and self-defense training in what would seem to be a further attempt to exploit racial grievances. According to reporting by Vanity Fair, up until that point, most known efforts had been aimed at "weaponizing the far-right".

A December 2018 report by The New York Times based on U.S. Senate data noted that the Internet Research Agency had created 81 Facebook pages around the time of the 2016 election. Of these, 30 pages specifically targeted African-Americans, attracting a total of 1.2 million followers. During the same time period, it had created 25 pages targeting right-wing audiences, and these had attracted a total of 1.4 million followers. According to The New York Times,

While the right-wing pages promoted Mr. Trump’s candidacy, the left-wing pages scorned Mrs. Clinton while promoting Senator Bernie Sanders of Vermont and Jill Stein, the Green Party candidate. The voter suppression effort was focused particularly on Sanders supporters and African-Americans, urging them to shun Mrs. Clinton in the general election and either vote for Ms. Stein or stay home.

Once the election was concluded, the IRA posted messages mocking accusations of Russian interference, with one post reading: “You’ve lost and don’t know what to do? Just blame it on Russian hackers.”

On 16 February 2018, the Internet Research Agency, along with 13 Russian individuals and two other Russian organizations, was indicted following an investigation by Special Counsel Robert Mueller with charges stemming from "impairing, obstructing, and defeating the lawful functions of government."

On 23 March 2018, The Daily Beast revealed new details about IRA gathered from leaked internal documents, which showed that IRA used Reddit and Tumblr as part of its influence campaign. On the same day, Tumblr announced that they had banned 84 accounts linked to IRA, saying that they had spread misinformation through conventional postings rather than advertisements.

In October 2018 the US Justice Department filed charges against Russian accountant Elena Khusyaynova for working with the IRA to influence not only the 2016 elections but also the upcoming 2018 midterm elections As of February 2024, Khusyaynova has not been apprehended, according to the Rewards for Justice Program.

=== Rallies and protests organized by IRA in the United States ===
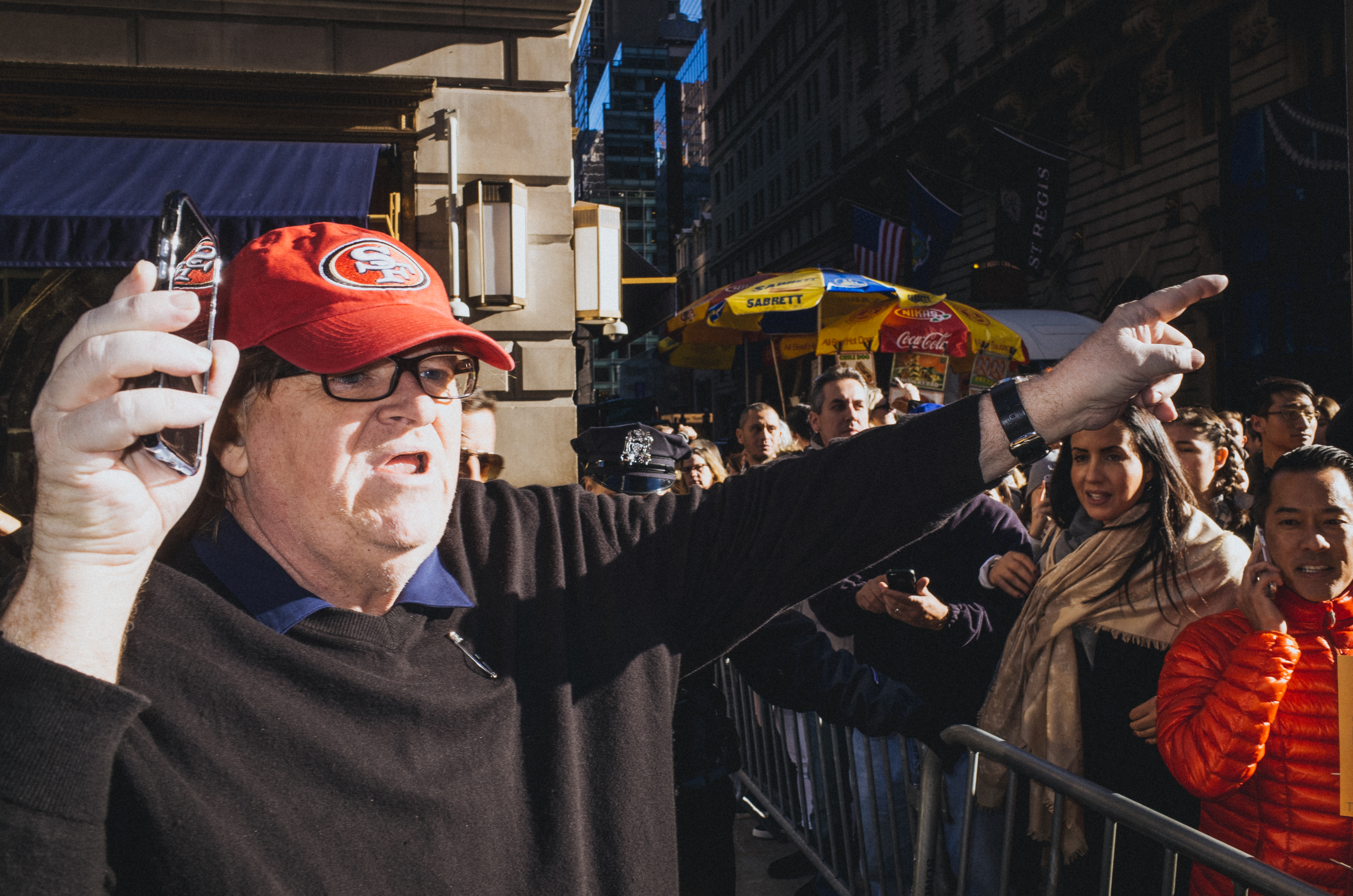
Michael Moore at the anti-Trump rally in New York City, 12 November 2016, which was allegedly organized by a Russian group

On 4 April 2016, a rally in Buffalo, New York protested the death of India Cummings, a black woman who had recently died in police custody. IRA's "Blacktivist" Facebook account actively promoted the event and reached out directly to local activists on Facebook Messenger asking them to circulate petitions and print. "Blacktivist" supplied the petitions and poster artwork.

On 16 April 2016, a rally protesting the death of Freddie Gray attracted large crowds in Baltimore. IRA's "Blacktivist" Facebook group promoted and organized the event, including reaching out to local activists.

On 23 April 2016, a small group of white-power demonstrators held a rally they called "Rock Stone Mountain" at Stone Mountain Park near Stone Mountain, Georgia. They were confronted by a large group of anti-racist counterprotestors, and some violent clashes ensued. The protest was heavily promoted by IRA accounts on Tumblr, Twitter, and Facebook, and the IRA website blackmatters.com. The IRA used its Blacktivist Facebook account to reach out, to no avail, to activist and academic Barbara Williams Emerson, the daughter of Hosea Williams, to help promote the protests. Afterward, RT blamed anti-racists for violence and promoted two videos shot at the event.

On 2 May 2016, a second rally was held in Buffalo, New York, protesting the death of India Cummings. Like the 4 April rally, the event was heavily promoted by IRA's "Blacktivist" Facebook account, including attempted outreach to local activists.

On 21 May 2016, two competing rallies were held in Houston to alternately protest against and defend the recently opened Library of Islamic Knowledge at the Islamic Da'wah Center. The "Stop Islamization of Texas" rally was organized by the Facebook group "Heart of Texas". The posting for the event encouraged participants to bring guns. A spokesman for the group conversed with the Houston Press via email but declined to give a name. The other rally, "Save Islamic Knowledge", was organized by another Facebook group called "United Muslims of America" for the same time and location. Both Facebook groups were later revealed to be IRA accounts.

On 25 May 2016, the Westboro Baptist Church held its annual protest of Lawrence High School graduation ceremonies in Lawrence, Kansas. The "LGBT United" Facebook group organized a counter protest to confront the Westboro Baptist Church protest, including by placing an ad on Facebook and contacting local people. About a dozen counter showed up. Lawrence High School students did not participate in the counter protest because they were skeptical of the counter protest organizers. "LGBT United" was an IRA account that appears to have been created specifically for this event.

"LGBT United" organized a candlelight vigil on 25 June 2016, for the Pulse nightclub shooting victims in Orlando, Florida.

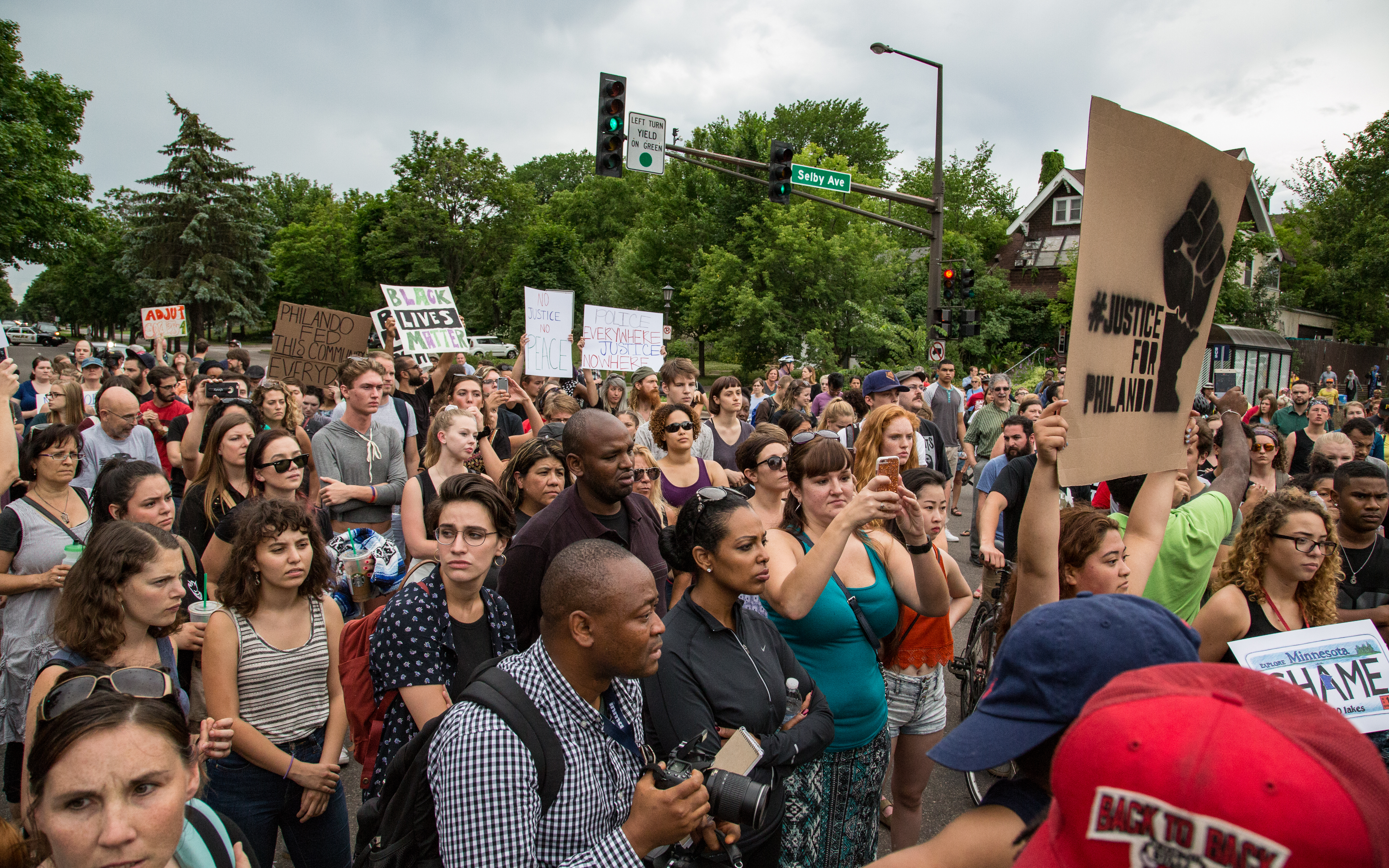
A protest in response to the Philando Castile shooting in July 2016

IRA's "Don't Shoot" Facebook group and affiliated "Don't Shoot Us" website tried to organize a protest outside St. Paul, Minnesota police headquarters on 10 July 2016, in response to the 6 July fatal police shooting of Philando Castile. Some local activists became suspicious of the motives behind the event because St. Paul police were not involved in the shooting. Castille had been shot by a St. Anthony police officer in nearby Falcon Heights. Local activists contacted "Don't Shoot." After being pressed on who they were and who supported them, "Don't Shoot" agreed to move the protest to St. Anthony police headquarters. The concerned local activists investigated further and urged not to participate after deciding "Don't Shoot" was a "total troll job." "Don't Shoot" organizers eventually relinquished control of the event to local organizers, who subsequently declined to accept any money offered by "Don't Shoot" to cover expenses.

A Black Lives Matter protest rally was held in Dallas on 10 July 2016. A "Blue Lives Matter" counter protest was held across the street. The "Blue Lives Matter" protest was organized by the "Heart of Texas" Facebook group controlled by the IRA.

The Blacktivist Facebook group organized a rally in Chicago to honor Sandra Bland on 16 July 2016, the first anniversary of her death. The rally was held in front of the Chicago Police Department's Homan Square facility. They passed around petitions calling for a Civilian Police Accountability Council ordinance.

17 "Florida Goes Trump" rallies were held across Florida on 25 August 2016. The rallies were organized by IRA using their "Being Patriotic" Facebook group and "march_for_trump" Twitter account.

The "SecuredBorders" Facebook group organized the "Citizens before refugees" protest rally on 27 August 2016, at the City Council Chambers in Twin Falls, Idaho. Only a small number of people showed up for the three-hour event, most likely because it was Saturday and the Chambers were closed. "SecureBorders" was an IRA account.

The "Safe Space for Muslim Neighborhood" rally was held outside the White House on 3 September 2016. At least 57 people attended the event organized by the IRA's "United Muslims of America" Facebook group.

"BlackMattersUS", an IRA website, recruited activists to participate in protests on the days immediately following 20 September 2016, police shooting of Keith Lamont Scott in Charlotte, North Carolina. The IRA paid for expenses such as microphones and speakers.

The "Miners for Trump" rallies held in Pennsylvania on 2 October 2016, were organized by IRA's "Being Patriotic" Facebook group.

The IRA ran its most popular ad on Facebook on 19 October 2016. The ad was for the IRA's Back the Badge Facebook group and showed a badge with the words "Back the Badge" in front of police lights under the caption "Community of people who support our brave Police Officers."

A large rally was held in Charlotte, North Carolina, on 22 October 2016, protesting the police shooting of Keith Lamont Scott. BlackMattersUS recruited unwitting local activists to organize the rally. BlackMattersUS provided one activist with a bank card to pay for rally expenses.

Anti-Hillary Clinton "Texit" rallies were held across Texas on 5 November 2016. The "Heart of Texas" Facebook group organized the rallies around the theme of Texas seceding from the United States if Hillary Clinton is elected. The group contacted the Texas Nationalist Movement, a secessionist organization, to help with organizing efforts, but they declined to help. Small rallies were held in Dallas, Fort Worth, Austin, and other cities. No one attended the Lubbock rally.

A Trump protest called "Trump is NOT my President" attracted 5,000 to 10,000 in Manhattan on 12 November 2016. Marched from Union Square to Trump Tower. The protest was organized by BlackMattersUS.

The IRA's "United Muslims of America" Facebook group organized the "Make peace, not war!" protest on 3 June 2017, outside Trump Tower in New York City. It is unclear whether anyone attended this protest or instead attended the "March for Truth" affiliated protest held on the same day.

== Lawsuit ==
In May 2015, a trolling company employee Lyudmila Savchuk in Saint Petersburg sued her employer for labor violations, seeking to disclose its activities. Ivan Pavlov from human rights defending initiative Team 29 represented Savchuk, and the defendant "troll-factory" agreed to pay Savchuk her withheld salaries and to restore her job.

Savchuk later described extreme psychological pressure at the work place, with jokes circulating among employees that "one can remain sane in the factory for two months maximum", as result of constant switching between different personalities that the workers are expected to design and maintain during work time.

The realization that you can invent any fact, then watch it absolutely synchronized with the media outlets as one massive information outflow and spread worldwide – that absolutely breaks your psyche

— Lyudmila Savchuk, Polygraph, "Working in Russian Troll Factory Pushed Reporter to ‘Edge of Insanity'", 2018

== Indictments ==
Indictment for interfering in the 2016 U.S. elections

On 16 February 2018, 13 individuals were indicted by the Washington, D.C. grand jury for alleged illegal interference in the 2016 presidential elections, during which they strongly supported the candidacy of Donald Trump, according to special counsel Robert Mueller's office. IRA, Concord Management and Concord Catering were also indicted. It was alleged that IRA was controlled by Yevgeny Prigozhin, a wealthy associate of Russian President Vladimir Putin.

The indicted individuals are Dzheykhun Nasimi Ogly Aslanov, Anna Vladislavovna Bogacheva, Maria Anatolyevna Bovda, Robert Sergeyevich Bovda, Mikhail Leonidovich Burchik, Mikhail Ivanovich Bystrov, Irina Viktorovna Kaverzina, Aleksandra Yuryevna Krylova, Vadim Vladimirovich Podkopaev, Sergey Pavlovich Polozov, Yevgeny Viktorovich Prigozhin, Gleb Igorevitch Vasilchenko, and Vladimir Venkov. All of the defendants are charged with conspiracy to defraud the United States, 3 are charged with conspiracy to commit wire fraud and bank fraud, and 5 defendants are charged with aggravated identity theft. None of the defendants are in custody. (Note: The American Department was headed by Jeykhun Aslanov, an Azerbaijani who, in October 2017, was 27. Maria Bovda was the previous head of the American Department.)

On 15 March, President Trump imposed financial sanctions under the Countering America's Adversaries Through Sanctions Act on the 13 Russian and organizations indicted by Mueller, preventing them from entering the United States to answer the charges should they wish to.

In October 2018 Russian accountant Elena Khusyaynova was charged with interference in the 2016 and 2018 US elections. She is alleged to have been working with the IRA. She was said to have managed a $16 million budget.

== Timeline of the Internet Research Agency interference in United States elections ==
=== 2014 ===
- April: The IRA creates a department called the "translator project". The department's focus is on interfering in the U.S. election.
- May: The IRA begins its election interference campaign of "spread[ing] distrust towards the candidates and the political system in general."
- 4–26 June: Aleksandra Krylova and Anna Bogacheva, two IRA employees, travel to the U.S. to collect intelligence. Maria Bovda, a third employee, is denied a visa. All three are indicted in February 2018 for their work on election interference.
- 11 September: The IRA spreads a hoax they created about a fictitious chemical plant fire in Centerville, St. Mary Parish, Louisiana, purportedly started by ISIS. The hoax includes tweets and YouTube videos showing a chemical plant fire. Centerville is home to many chemical plants, but the plant named in the tweets does not exist. Initial tweets are sent directly to politicians, journalists, and Centerville residents.
- 21 September – 11 October: The Material Evidence art exhibition is displayed at the Art Beam gallery in the Chelsea neighborhood of New York City. It portrays the conflicts in Syria and Ukraine in a pro-Russian light. It is promoted by Twitter accounts that also spread the 11 September chemical plant fire hoax. The exhibition is partly funded by the IRA.
- 13 December:
  - The IRA uses Twitter to spread a hoax about an Ebola outbreak in Atlanta. Many of the Twitter accounts used in the 11 September chemical plant fire hoax also spread this hoax. The hoax includes a YouTube video of medical workers wearing hazmat suits.
  - Using a different set of Twitter accounts, the IRA spreads a hoax about a purported police shooting of an unarmed black woman in Atlanta. The hoax includes a blurry video of the purported event.

=== 2015 ===
- July onward: Thousands of fake Twitter accounts run by the IRA begin to praise Trump over his political opponents by a wide margin, according to a later analysis by The Wall Street Journal.
- 3 November:The IRA Instagram account "Stand For Freedom" attempts to organize a confederate rally in Houston, Texas, on 14 November. It is unclear if anyone showed up. The Mueller Report identifies this as the IRA's first attempt to organize a U.S. rally.
- 19 November: The IRA creates first Twitter account. Purporting to be the "Unofficial Twitter account of Tennessee Republicans," it peaks at over 100,000 followers.

=== 2016 ===
- 10 February: IRA instructs workers to "use any opportunity to criticize Hillary and the rest (except Sanders and Trump—we support them)."
- April: The IRA starts buying online ads on social media and other sites. The ads support Trump and attack Clinton.
- 4 April: A rally is held in Buffalo, New York, protesting the death of India Cummings. Cummings was a black woman who had recently died in police custody. The IRA's "Blacktivist" account on Facebook actively promotes the event, reaching out directly to local activists on Facebook Messenger asking them to circulate petitions and print posters for the event. Blacktivist supplies the petitions and poster artwork.
- 16 April: A rally protesting the death of Freddie Gray attracts large crowds in Baltimore. The IRA's Blacktivist Facebook group promotes and organizes the event, including reaching out to local activists.
- 19 April: The IRA purchases its first pro-Trump ad through its "Tea Party News" Instagram account. The Instagram ad asks users to upload photos with the hashtag #KIDS4TRU to "make a patriotic team of young Trump supporters."
- 23 April: A small group of white-power demonstrators hold a rally they call "Rock Stone Mountain" at Stone Mountain Park near Stone Mountain, Georgia. They are confronted by a large group of protesters, and some violent clashes ensue. The counterprotest was heavily promoted by IRA accounts on Tumblr, Twitter, and Facebook, and the IRA website blackmatters.com. The IRA uses its Blacktivist account on Facebook to reach out, to no avail, to activist and academic Barbara Williams Emerson, the daughter of Hosea Williams, to help promote the protests. Afterward, RT blames anti-racist protesters for violence and promotes two videos shot at the event.
- 2 May: A second rally is held in Buffalo, New York, protesting the death of India Cummings. Like the 4 April rally, the event is heavily promoted by the IRA's Blacktivist Facebook account, including attempted outreach to local activists.
- 21 May: Two competing rallies are held in Houston to alternately protest against and defend the recently opened Library of Islamic Knowledge at the Islamic Da'wah Center. The "Stop Islamization of Texas" rally is organized by the Facebook group "Heart of Texas". The Facebook posting for the event encourages participants to bring guns. A spokesman for the group converses with the Houston Press via email but declines to give a name. The other rally, "Save Islamic Knowledge", is organized by the Facebook group "United Muslims of America" for the same time and location. Both Facebook groups are later revealed to be IRA accounts.
- 29 May: The IRA hires an American to pose in front of the White House holding a sign that says, "Happy 55th Birthday, Dear Boss." "Boss" is a reference to Russian oligarch Yevgeny Prigozhin.
- 1 June: The IRA plans a Manhattan rally called "March for Trump" and buys Facebook ads promoting the event.
- 4 June: The IRA email account sends news releases about the "March for Trump" rally to New York City media outlets.
- 5 June: The IRA contacts a Trump campaign volunteer to provide signs for the "March for Trump" rally.
- 23 June: The IRA persona "Matt Skiber" contacts an American to recruit for the "March for Trump" rally.
- 24 June: The IRA group "United Muslims of America" buys Facebook ads for the "Support Hillary, Save American Muslims" rally.
- 25 June:
  - The IRA's "March for Trump" rally occurs.
  - The IRA Facebook group LGBT United organizes a candlelight vigil for the Pulse nightclub shooting victims in Orlando, Florida.
- July: The IRA's translator project grows to over 80 employees.
- Summer: IRA employees use the stolen identities of four Americans to open PayPal and bank accounts to act as conduits for funding their activities in the United States.
- 5 July: "United Muslims of America", an IRA group, orders posters with fake Clinton quotes promoting Sharia Law. The posters are ordered for the "Support Hillary, Save American Muslims" rally they are organizing.
- 6–10 July: The IRA's "Don't Shoot" Facebook group and affiliated "Don't Shoot Us" website try to organize a protest outside the St. Paul, Minnesota, police headquarters on 10 July in response to the 6 July fatal police shooting of Philando Castile. Some local activists become suspicious of the event because St. Paul police were not involved in the shooting: Castile was shot by a St. Anthony police officer in nearby Falcon Heights. Local activists contact Don't Shoot. After being pressed on who they are and who supports them, Don't Shoot agrees to move the protest to the St. Anthony police headquarters. The concerned local activists investigate further and urge protesters not to participate after deciding Don't Shoot is a "total troll job." Don't Shoot organizers eventually relinquish control of the event to local organizers, who subsequently decline to accept any money from Don't Shoot.
- 9 July: The "Support Hillary, Save American Muslims" rally occurs in Washington, D.C. The rally is organized by the IRA group "United Muslims of America."
- 10 July: A Black Lives Matter protest rally is held in Dallas. A "Blue Lives Matter" counterprotest is held across the street. The Blue Lives Matter protest is organized by the "Heart of Texas" Facebook group, controlled by the IRA.
- 12 July: An IRA group buys ads on Facebook for the "Down with Hillary" rally in New York City.
- 16 July: The IRA's Blacktivist group organizes a rally in Chicago to honor Sandra Bland on the first anniversary of her death. The rally is held in front of the Chicago Police Department's Homan Square building. Participants pass around petitions calling for a Civilian Police Accountability Council ordinance.
- 23 July: The IRA-organized "Down with Hillary" rally is held in New York City. The agency sends 30 news releases to media outlets using email.
- 2–3 August: The IRA's "Matt Skiber" persona contacts the real "Florida for Trump" Facebook account. The "T.W." persona contacts other grassroots groups.
- 4 August:
  - The IRA's Facebook account "Stop AI" accuses Clinton of voter fraud during the Iowa Caucuses. They buy ads promoting the post.
  - IRA groups buy ads for the "Florida Goes Trump" rallies. The 8,300 people who click on the ads are sent to the Agency's "Being Patriotic" Facebook page.
- 5 August: The IRA Twitter second account hires an actress to play Hillary Clinton in prison garb and someone to build a cage to hold the actress. The actress and cage are to appear at the "Florida Goes Trump" rally in West Palm Beach, Florida on 20 August.
- 11 August: The IRA Twitter first account claims that voter fraud is being investigated in North Carolina.
- 12–18 August: The IRA's persona "Josh Milton" communicates with Trump Campaign officials via email to request Trump/Pence signs and the phone numbers of campaign affiliates as part of an effort to organize pro-Trump campaign rallies in Florida.
- 15 August: A Trump campaign county chair contacts the IRA through their phony email accounts to suggest locations for rallies.
- 16 August: The IRA buys ads on Instagram for the "Florida Goes Trump" rallies.
- 18 August:
  - The IRA uses its email account to contact a Trump campaign official in Florida. The email requests campaign support at the forthcoming "Florida Goes Trump" rallies. It is unknown whether the campaign official responded.
  - The IRA pays the person they hired to build a cage for a "Florida Goes Trump" rally in West Palm Beach, Florida.
- 19 August:
  - A Trump supporter suggests to the IRA Twitter account "March for Trump" that it contact a Trump campaign official. The official is emailed by the agency.
  - The IRA's "Matt Skiber" persona contacts another Trump campaign official on Facebook.
- 20 August: 17 "Florida Goes Trump" rallies are held across Florida. The rallies are organized by Russian trolls from the IRA.
- 27 August: The IRA Facebook group "SecuredBorders" organizes a "Citizens before refugees" protest rally at the City Council Chambers in Twin Falls, Idaho. Only a small number of people show up for the three-hour event, most likely because it is Saturday and the Chambers are closed.
- 31 August:
  - An American contacts the IRA's "Being Patriotic" account about a possible 11 September event in Miami.
  - The IRA buys ads for a 11 September rally in New York City.
- 3 September: The IRA Facebook group "United Muslims of America" organizes a "Safe Space for Muslim Neighborhood" rally outside the White House, attracting at least 57 people.
- 9 September: The IRA sends money to its American groups to fund the 11 September rally in Miami, and to pay the actress who portrayed Clinton at the West Palm Beach, Florida, rally.
- 20–26 September: BlackMattersUS, an IRA website, recruits activists to participate in protests over the police shooting of Keith Lamont Scott in Charlotte, North Carolina. The IRA pays for expenses such as microphones and speakers.
- 22 September: The IRA buys ads on Facebook for "Miners for Trump" rallies in Pennsylvania.
- 2 October: "Miners for Trump" rallies are held across Pennsylvania. The IRA uses the same techniques to organize the rallies as they used for the "Florida Goes Trump" rallies, including hiring a person to wear a Clinton mask and a prison uniform.
- 16 October: The IRA's Instagram account "Woke Blacks" makes a post aimed at suppressing black voter turnout.
- 19 October The IRA runs its most popular ad on Facebook. The ad is for the IRA's Back the Badge Facebook group and shows a badge with the words "Back the Badge" in front of police lights under the caption "Community of people who support our brave Police Officers."
- 22 October: A large rally is held in Charlotte, North Carolina, protesting the police shooting of Keith Lamont Scott. The IRA website BlackMattersUS recruits unwitting local activists to organize the rally. BlackMattersUS provides an activist with a bank card to pay for rally expenses.
- 2 November: The IRA Twitter first account alleges "#VoterFraud by counting tens of thousands of ineligible mail in Hillary votes being reported in Broward County, Florida." Trump Jr. retweets it.
- 3 November: The IRA Instagram account "Blacktivist" suggests people vote for Stein instead of Clinton.
- 5 November: Anti-Clinton "Texit" rallies are held across Texas. The IRA's "Heart of Texas" Facebook group organizes the rallies around the theme of Texas seceding from the United States if Clinton is elected. The group contacts the Texas Nationalist Movement, a secessionist organization, to help with organizing efforts, but they decline to help. Small rallies are held in Dallas, Fort Worth, Austin, and other cities. No one attends the Lubbock rally.
- 8 November: Hours after the polls close, the hashtag #Calexit is retweeted by thousands of IRA accounts.
- 11 November: A large banner is hung from the Arlington Memorial Bridge in Washington, D.C., showing a photo of Obama with the words "Goodbye Murderer" at the bottom. The IRA Twitter third account takes credit and is an early promoter of the banner.
- 12 November: A Trump protest called "Trump is NOT my President" attracts 5,000–10,000 protestors in Manhattan who march from Union Square to Trump Tower. The protest is organized by the IRA using their BlackMattersUS Facebook account.
- 19 November: The IRA organizes the "Charlotte Against Trump" rally in Charlotte, North Carolina.
- 8 December: The IRA runs an ad on Craigslist to hire someone to walk around New York City dressed as Santa Claus while wearing a Trump mask.

=== 2017 ===
- 9 April: The Internet Research Agency (IRA)'s "United Muslims of America" Facebook group posts a meme complaining about the cost of the 6 April missile strike on Syria by the United States. The strike had been made in retaliation for a chemical weapons attack by the Syrian government. The meme asserts the $93 million cost of the strike "could have founded [sic] Meals on Wheels until 2029."
- 3 June: The IRA's "United Muslims of America" Facebook group organizes the "Make peace, not war!" protest outside Trump Tower in New York City. It is unclear whether anyone attends this protest or instead attends the "March for Truth" affiliated protest held on the same day.
  - Thousands of people participate in the "Protest Trump and ideology of hate at Trump Tower!" protest outside Trump Tower in New York City. The protest was organized by the "Resisters" group on Facebook, one of the "bad actor" groups identified by Facebook in July 2018 as possibly belonging to the IRA.
- 23 August: The Internet Research Agency's first Twitter account is closed.
- 6 September: Facebook admits selling advertisements to Russian companies seeking to reach U.S. voters. Hundreds of accounts were reportedly tied to the Internet Research Agency. Facebook pledges full cooperation with Mueller's investigation, and begins to provide details on purchases from Russia, including identities of the people involved.
- 9 September: Thousand of people participate in the "We Stand with DREAMers! Support DACA!" rally in New York City. The rally was organized by the "Resisters" group on Facebook, one of the "bad actor" groups identified by Facebook in July 2018 as possibly belonging to the IRA.
- 9 September: Trump responds to a tweet, containing "we love you Mr. President." from IRA fourth Twitter account - a "backup" of now-closed IRA first one - saying, "THANK YOU for your support Miami! My team just shared photos from your TRUMP SIGN WAVING DAY, yesterday! I love you- and there is no question – TOGETHER, WE WILL MAKE AMERICA GREAT AGAIN!".
- 28 September:
  - Twitter announces that it identified 201 non-bot accounts tied to the IRA.
  - Democrats rebuke Twitter for its "frankly inadequate" response to Russian meddling.
  - Mother Jones writes that "fake news on Twitter flooded swing states that helped Trump win."
- 23 October: The Daily Beast reports that Greenfloid LLC, a tiny web hosting company registered to Sergey Kashyrin and two others, hosted IRA propaganda websites DoNotShoot.Us, BlackMattersUS.com and others on servers in a Staten Island neighborhood. Greenfloid is listed as the North American subsidiary of ITL, a hosting company based in Kharkiv, Ukraine, registered to Dmitry Deineka. Deineka gave conflicting answers when questioned by The Daily Beast about the IRA websites.
- 1 November: Twitter tells the Senate Intelligence Committee that it has found 2,752 IRA accounts and 36,746 Russia-linked bot accounts involved in election-related retweets.

=== 2018 ===
- 16 February: Mueller indicts 13 Russian citizens, IRA/Glavset and two other Russian entities in a 37-page indictment returned by a federal grand jury in the District of Columbia.
- A 15 July Business Insider article revealed a new Russian intelligence-linked "news" site, USAReally, which follows in the footsteps of previous Russian IRA-backed troll farms, and appears to be an attempt to "test the waters" ahead of the mid-terms.
- 31 July: Facebook announces they have shut down eight pages, 17 profiles, and seven Instagram accounts related to "bad actors" identified recently with activity profiles similar to the IRA. The company says it doesn't have enough information to attribute the accounts, groups, and events to the IRA, but that a known IRA account was briefly an administrator of the "Resisters" group. The "Resisters" group was the first organizer on Facebook of the upcoming "No Unite The Right 2 – DC" protest scheduled in Washington, D.C., for 10 August. Some of the event's other organizers insist they started organizing before "Resisters" created the event's Facebook page.
- 25 September: The New York Times reports that the Moscow-based news website "USAReally.com" appears to be a continuation of the IRA's fake news propaganda efforts targeting Americans. The site, launched in May, has been banned from Facebook, Twitter, and Reddit. A new Facebook page created by the site is being monitored by Facebook.
- 12 September: The Wall Street Journal reports that nearly 600 IRA Twitter accounts posted nearly 10,000 mostly conservative-targeted messages about health policy and Obamacare from 2014 through May 2018. Pro-ObamaCare messages peaked around the spring of 2016 when Senator Bernie Sanders and Hillary Clinton were fighting for the Democratic Party presidential nomination. Anti-Obamacare messages peaked during the debates leading up to the attempted repeal of the Affordable Care Act in the spring of 2017.
- On 19 October, The US Justice Department charges 44-year-old Russian accountant Elena Alekseevna Khusyaynova of Saint Petersburg with conspiracy to defraud the United States by managing the finances of the social media troll operation, including the IRA, that attempted to interfere with the 2016 and 2018 US elections.
- 20 November: The Federal Agency of News (FAN) sues Facebook in the U.S. District Court for the Northern District of California for violating its free speech rights by closing its account in April. The FAN is a sister organization to the IRA that operates from the same building in St. Petersburg. The FAN claims in its filing that it has no knowledge of the IRA, even though some current FAN employees were indicted by Mueller for their work with the IRA.

=== 2019 ===
- 2 February: Twitter removed accounts suspected of being connected to the Russian Internet Research Agency that had disseminated a high volume of tweets related to QAnon that also used the #WWG1WGA slogan.
- 12 April: The Washington Post reports that researchers at Clemson University found the IRA sent thousands of tweets during the 2016 election campaign in an attempt to drive Bernie Sanders supporters away from Hillary Clinton and towards Donald Trump.

=== 2020 ===
- 12 March: CNN's Clarissa Ward reveals that Russia and the IRA have been running "troll factories" based in Nigeria and Ghana, with the aim to disrupt the 2020 U.S. presidential campaign.

== See also ==
- 50 Cent Party
- 1450 Internet army
- Active measures
- AK Trolls
- Astroturfing
- CyberBerkut
- Fake news website
- Foreign exploitation of American race relations
- Internet manipulation
- Internet Water Army
- Netto-uyoku
- Operation Earnest Voice
- Public opinion brigades
- Russian interference in the 2016 United States elections
- Team Jorge
- Vulkan files leak
- Web brigades
