= Patriot Media Group =

Russian media company

- Founded: 2019
- Dissolved: 30 June 2023
- Headquarters: St. Petersburg, {{{location_country}}}
- Key people: Yevgeny Prigozhin (owner)
- Industry: Mass media
- Website: mediapatriot.ru riafan.ru (RIA FAN)

Patriot Media Group was a Russian media conglomerate owned by Wagner Group leader Yevgeny Prigozhin. It was shut down on 30 June 2023 after the failed Wagner Group rebellion. The group's most prominent outlet was the Federal News Agency (RIA FAN).

== History ==
Patriot Media Group was officially founded by Yevgeny Prigozhin in 2019, however some subsidiaries began operating much earlier, such as RIA FAN which registered its website in 2014. It was headquartered in Saint Petersburg, with additional known offices in Africa and Crimea.

On 30 June 2023, Russia's media regulator Roskomnadzor blocked access to five Patriot Media Group outlets following the 23–24 June 2023 Wagner rebellion. The same day, it was announced that Patriot Media Group would be closed down. The National Media Group was thought to be a potential buyer of the group's assets, but this did not materialize.

== Subsidiaries ==
Patriot Media Group comprised a large number of publications, described by sources as dozens or even hundreds. Notable subsidiaries included:

- RIA FAN (Federal News Agency)
- Politika Segodnya (Politics Today)
- Ekonomika Segodnya (Economics Today)
- Narodnye Novosti (People's News)
- Nevskie Novosti

The group additionally had strong links and employee overlap with the Internet Research Agency troll farm (IRA); for example, RIA FAN shared an office with the IRA until 2015, and multiple outlets that joined Patriot Media Group in 2021 did so for longer. Serge Poliakoff wrote in a 2025 Problems of Post-Communism article that "it can be suggested that the IRA's activities and part of its workforce might have been gradually absorbed" by Patriot Media Group. Patriot Media Group has often been described as encompassing the IRA.

== Content ==
As a private entity, while Patriot Media Group was ideologically aligned with the Russian government it was not state-controlled, and had the independence to sometimes criticize state actors. A 2021 Cardiff University investigation found coordination between Russian state-owned media and Patriot Media Group outlets, and described the outlets as spreading propaganda and disinformation. RFE/RL described RIA FAN's content as having "a strongly patriotic, pro-Kremlin line while also providing positive coverage of Prigozhin's activities and attacking rivals".

== Sanctions ==
In December 2018 (before the official establishment of Patriot Media Group), the United States Department of the Treasury designated RIA FAN, Ekonomika Segodnya and Nevskie Novosti for their roles in the Project Lakhta election interference effort. The "USA Really" website was also designated as being owned or controlled by RIA FAN.

RIA FAN was sanctioned by the European Union in 2023 alongside the Wagner Group for actions that "undermine or threaten the territorial integrity, sovereignty and independence of Ukraine". Meta also banned RIA FAN in response to IRA foreign interference activities.

== See also ==
- Pravda network
