= Municipal Okrug 65 =

Municipal Okrug 65 муниципальный округ №65
- Municipal okrug
- Coat of arms

- Municipal Okrug 65 in St. Petersburg
- Coordinates: 60°00′N 30°13′E
- Country: Russia
- Federal city: St. Petersburg

Population (2010 Census)
  - Total: 127,473
- Website: http://momo65.net.ru

Municipal Okrug 65 (Russian: муниципа́льный о́круг №65) is a municipal okrug in Primorsky District, one of the eighty-one low-level municipal divisions of the federal city of St. Petersburg, Russia. As of the 2010 Census, its population was 127,473, up from 83,952 recorded during the 2002 Census.
