= Lakhtinsky crossover =

Bridge in Lakhtinsky Razliv Lake, Saint Petersburg, Russia

- Carried: One way rail traffic
- Crossed: Lakhtinsky Razliv Lake
- Locale: Lakhtinsky Razliv Lake
- Maintained by: RZhD, OktZhD, SPbZhD

Characteristics
- Design: Metal one-span girder bridge, based on box-shaped beams on stone coastal foundations
- Material: Metal
- Width: 1 track-way

History
- Construction end: 1894
- Opened: 1894, 1925
- Collapsed: 1924

The Lakhtinsky crossover is a railroad line that crosses the Lakhtinsky Razliv lake in Saint Petersburg, Russia. For the first stage of the Primorskaya line on the route from Novaya Derevnya to Lakhta, it was necessary to cross lake Lakhtinsky Razliv.

== Construction ==
Engineer P. A. Avenarius constructed the crossover in 1894. It was a 200-metre (660 ft) pile bridge which paralleled the Lakhtinsky dam on which there was a road. Near to the bridge, Shunting loop Dum and Shunting loop 2 verst were constructed. The bridge opened July 12, 1894.

== Destruction and rebuilding ==
Catastrophic flooding on September 23, 1924 completely destroyed the bridge. It was restored in 1925 at its current location.

== Current structure ==
As of 2009, the bridge is a metal one-span girder bridge, constructed from box-shaped beams on stone foundations.
