= Lakhta (rural locality) =

Lakhta (Russian: Лахта) is the name of several rural localities in Russia.

- Lakhta, Severodvinsk, Arkhangelsk Oblast, a village under the administrative jurisdiction of Severodvinsk in Arkhangelsk Oblast
- Lakhta, Katuninsky Selsoviet, Primorsky District, Arkhangelsk Oblast, a village in Katuninsky Selsoviet of Primorsky District in Arkhangelsk Oblast
- Lakhta, Lastolsky Selsoviet, Primorsky District, Arkhangelsk Oblast, a village in Lastolsky Selsoviet of Primorsky District in Arkhangelsk Oblast
- Lakhta (Essoylskoye Rural Settlement), Pryazhinsky District, Republic of Karelia, a village in Pryazhinsky District of the Republic of Karelia; municipally, a part of Essoylskoye Rural Settlement of that district
- Lakhta (Vedlozerskoye Rural Settlement), Pryazhinsky District, Republic of Karelia, a village in Pryazhinsky District of the Republic of Karelia; municipally, a part of Vedlozerskoye Rural Settlement of that district
- Lakhta, Boksitogorsky District, Leningrad Oblast, a village in Radogoshchinskoye Settlement Municipal Formation of Boksitogorsky District in Leningrad Oblast
- Lakhta, Volkhovsky District, Leningrad Oblast, a village in Potaninskoye Settlement Municipal Formation of Volkhovsky District in Leningrad Oblast

== See also ==
- Lakhta, Saint Petersburg, a historical area of Saint Petersburg, Russia
