= Lakhtinsky Razliv =

Lake in Saint Petersburg, Russia

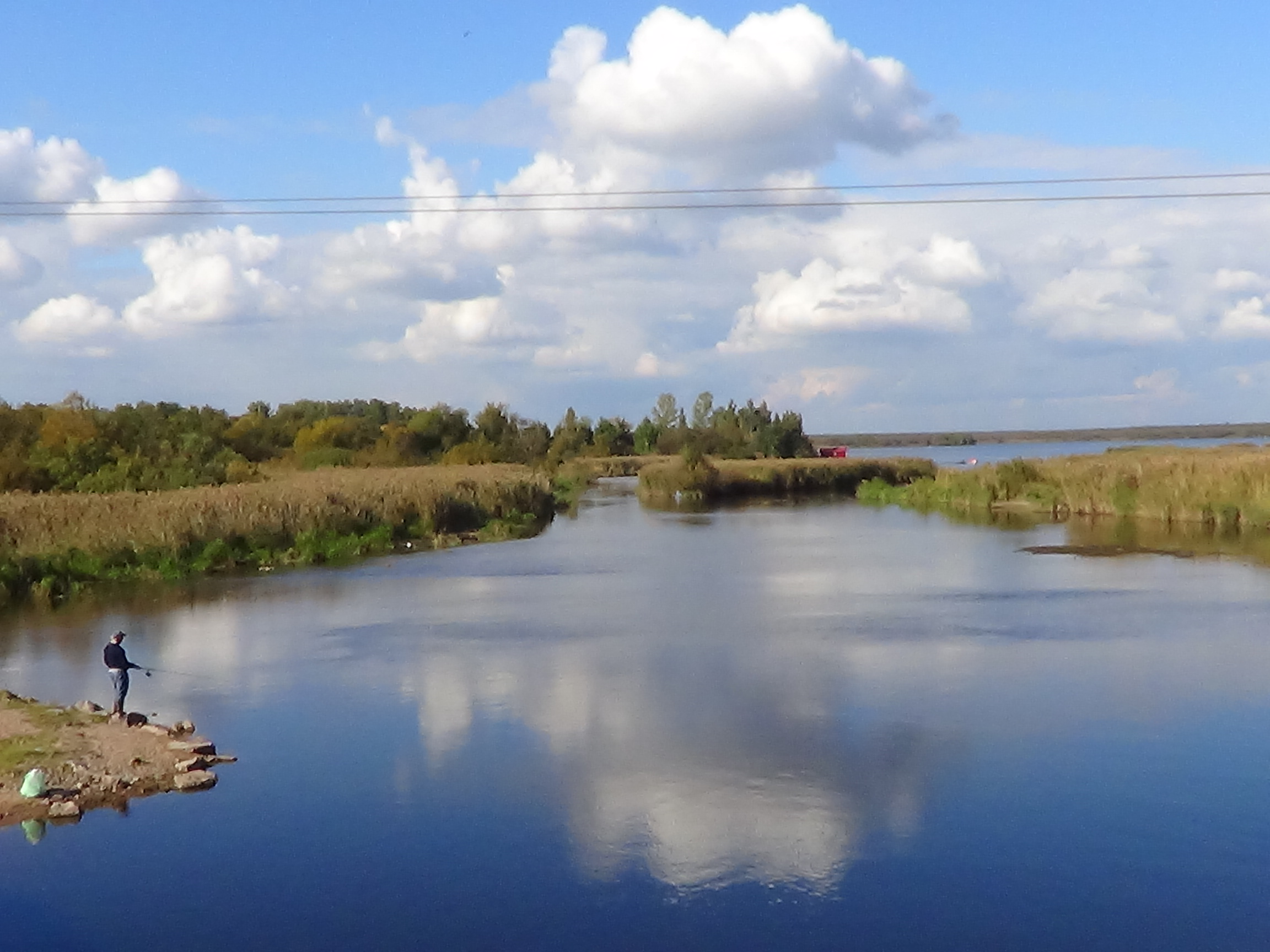

- Location within Saint Petersburg
- Location: Primorsky District, Saint Petersburg
- Coordinates: 60°0′1″N 30°10′47″E
- Primary inflows: Kamenka, Glukharka and Yuntolovka rivers
- Primary outflows: Bobylka River
- Basin countries: Russia
- Max. length: 6 km (3.7 mi)
- Max. width: 4 km (2.5 mi)
- Surface area: 1.76 km^{2} (0.68 sq mi)
- Average depth: 4.3 m (14 ft)
- Max. depth: 8.3 m (27 ft)

Lake Lakhta (Russian: Лахтинский разлив; Lakhtinsky razliv; from Finnish lahti, 'gulf') is a lake (or inlet) in St. Petersburg's Primorsky District connected to the Neva Bay of the Baltic Sea by the 500-meter-long Bobylka River.

The Kamenka, Glukharka and Yuntolovka rivers empty into the lake. Its area is 1.76 km^{2}, with the maximum depth of 8.3 meters. The lakeside village of Lakhta takes its name from the lake. Along the eastern shore extends the neighbourhood of Kolomäki.

The lake belongs to the Yuntolovsky Reserve, zakaznik established in 1999 to conserve the nature of the nearby wetlands, providing, among other things, habitat for a significant population of the shrub Myrica gale, which is protected in Russia.

== Reasons for the unsatisfactory condition of the water ==
- Active construction along the banks of the reservoir.
- Littering of the territory and the presence of landfills.
- Unsatisfactory condition of the Yuntolovka, Kamenka and Glukharka rivers.

== See also ==
- Lakhtinsky crossover
- Lakhta-Olgino Municipal Okrug
