= Elena Khusyaynova =

Russian accountant

Elena Alekseevna Khusyaynova (Russian: Елена Алексеевна Хусяйнова) is a Russian accountant based in Saint Petersburg who was charged in September 2018 with conspiracy to defraud the United States by interfering in the 2016 and 2018 U.S. elections. She is accused of managing the finances of "Project Lakhta", a $35 million social media operation that used fake Twitter, Facebook and other profiles to spread misinformation and discord. The crimes are alleged to have occurred from 2014 to 2018. Khusyaynova reacted to the indictment with irony about the ability of "a simple Russian woman" to "help the citizens of a superpower to elect their president".

Project Lakhta was conducted by the Internet Research Agency and funded by various Concord Catering affiliates, under the direction of Russian oligarch Yevgeny Prigozhin. All were previously charged with related offenses as part of the Mueller special counsel investigation. The case was filed in the United States District Court for the Eastern District of Virginia by the United States Department of Justice with assistance from the Federal Bureau of Investigation (FBI). The charges were not filed by the Special Counsel's office because the associated activities also related to the 2018 elections, which were out of Mueller's jurisdiction.

Khusyaynova is also the chief financial officer of USA Really, a conspiratorial website run by a Russian media executive and Kremlin policy adviser.

== See also ==
- Criminal charges brought in the Mueller special counsel investigation
- Russian interference in the 2016 United States elections
- Russian interference in the 2018 United States elections
