= Columbian Chemicals Plant explosion hoax =

2014 hoax

- Date: September 11, 2014
- Time: 6.20 am CDT (UTC−05:00)
- Location: Columbian Chemicals Co, 5205 LA 3115, Centerville, Louisiana; 30.234238°N 91.052937°W
- Location of the Columbian Chemicals Co in Louisiana.

The Columbian Chemicals plant explosion was a hoax claiming an explosion at a chemical plant in Centerville, St. Mary Parish, Louisiana. On September 11, 2014, reports of an alleged explosion were sent to local residents via text messages and spread through various social media. Several reports claimed that the militant group ISIS had taken responsibility for the attack. St. Mary Parish officials claimed that the reports of an explosion were a hoax. A spokesperson for the company told reporters that the reports of an explosion were a hoax:

We have been informed by the community that a text message has been received by several individuals indicating a release of toxic gas from the Birla Carbon's Columbian Chemicals Plant near Centerville, Louisiana. The content as stated by the text message is not true. There has been no release of such toxic gas, explosion or any other incident in our facility. We are not aware of the origin of this text message. Law enforcement authorities have been contacted and are following up on this matter.

The hoax was reported to have involved "dozens of fake accounts that posted hundreds of tweets for hours, targeting a list of figures precisely chosen to generate maximum attention. The perpetrators didn’t just doctor screenshots from CNN; they also created fully functional clones of the websites of Louisiana TV stations and newspapers." It was one of "a wave of similar attacks" in the US during the second half of 2014 that used hoaxes (including fabricated ebola outbreaks and police shootings) in an attempt to create public panic or outrage.

== Propagation ==
=== Text messages ===
In text messages received by many local residents on September 11, 2014, there was a stated potential chemical threat not only to local neighborhoods, such as Franklin, Morgan City, Patterson and Baldwin, but also to New Orleans and Baton Rouge. Based on sources from the Columbian Chemicals Company and St. Mary Parish officials, multiple local news outlets called the text messages a hoax.

=== Twitter ===
On Twitter, a screenshot was circulated of the New Orleans Times-Picayune's website, which depicted an article about the explosion; however, the Times-Picayune stated that they had not reported on the explosion and that any attribution of the story to their newspaper was "bogus". Many accounts on Twitter retweeted the screenshot and otherwise discussed the incident using several hashtags, principally #ColumbianChemicals. An analysis by Gilad Lotan, a data scientist at Betaworks, determined that many of these accounts were controlled by bots.

=== Wikipedia ===
A Wikipedia user with few prior edits named AmandaGray91 created a Wikipedia page describing the alleged explosion. The hoax was promptly detected by other Wikipedia users, and the article was flagged accordingly.

=== Facebook ===
A public Facebook page titled "Louisiana News," which began posting articles in August 2014, posted an article describing the alleged incident. The page had accumulated over 6000 Facebook likes by the time it published the article. As of 7 March 2015, the Facebook page remained accessible.

=== YouTube ===
A video was uploaded to YouTube purported to depict news footage of ISIS claiming responsibility for the alleged attack. The video was then used as a source in the Wikipedia page and posted in Facebook.

== Analysis ==
Betaworks CEO John Borthwick described the hoax in an essay as an unsuccessful attempt to "hack" social media. The essay uses analysis by Betaworks data scientist Gilad Lotan to argue that the effort likely originated inside Russia, and failed to achieve virality in part because the fake identities it used had little connection with genuine human identities. Borthwick concludes that a successful hoax would have required its creator to embed the fake identities in real social networks, which he argues would have required considerable time and effort.

In June 2015, The New York Times Magazine published an extensive article by Adrian Chen, claiming the hoax "was a highly coordinated disinformation campaign" and that the "virtual assault" was the work of the Internet Research Agency, a Russian institution with about 400 employees, that "industrialized the art of trolling", specializing in nationalistic online propaganda, funded either by the Russian Government or a close ally.

== See also ==
- List of hoaxes
