= Olgino =

Historical area in Saint Petersburg, Russia

Coordinates: 59°59′30″N 30°7′41″E

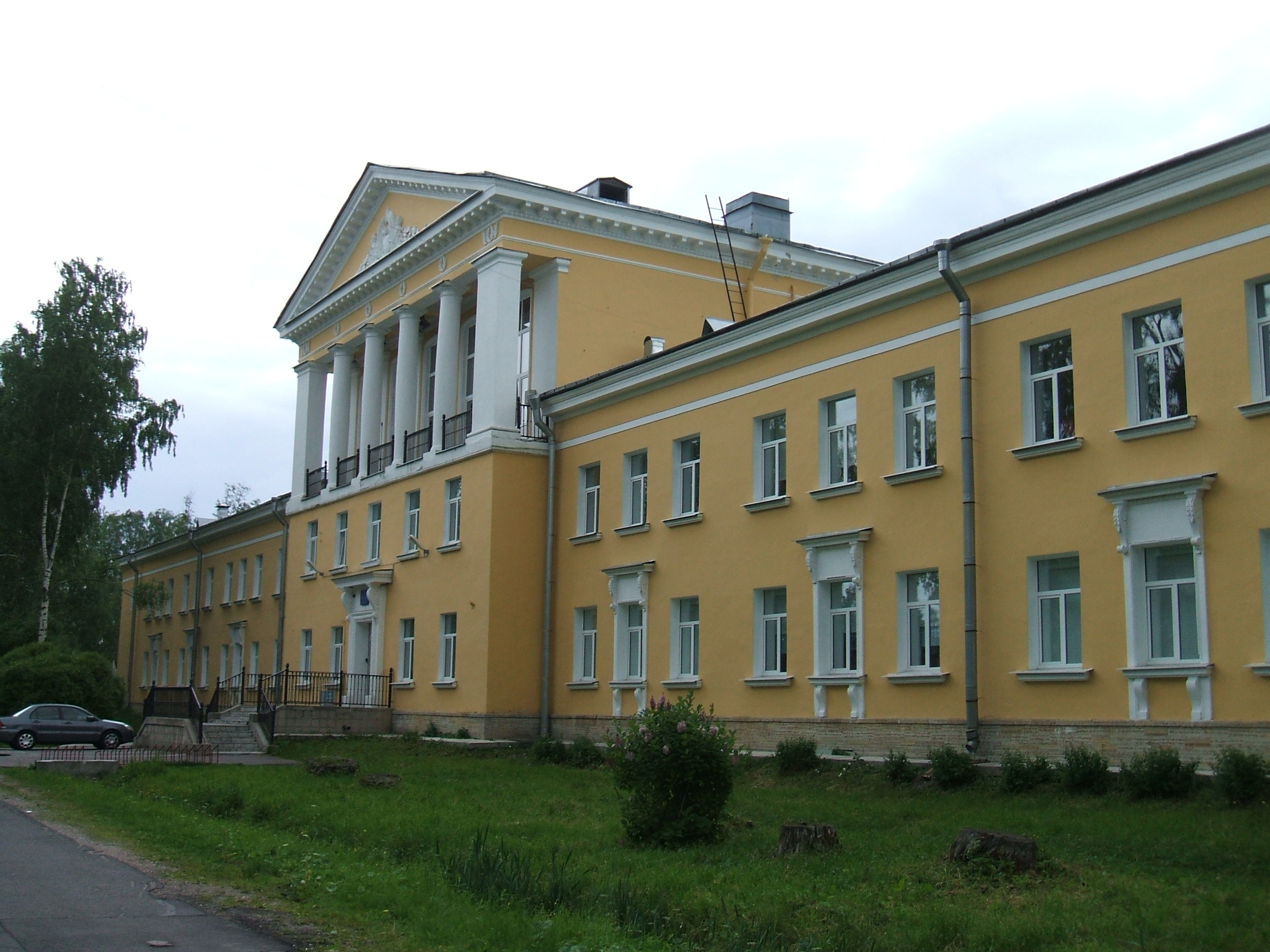
A school building in Olgino

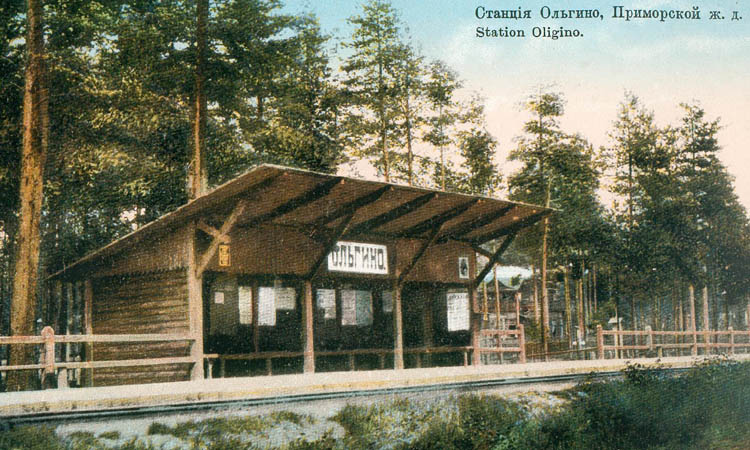
The Olgino railway station of the Primorsky Railway in the early 20th century

Olgino (Russian: О́льгино) is a historical area in Lakhta-Olgino Municipal Okrug of St. Petersburg, Russia, located south-west of the area of Lakhta and east of Lisy Nos. This part of the Neva Bay coast was owned in the mid-19th century by Count Stenbock-Fermor, of Swedish provenance, who bestowed upon it the name of his wife Olga. In the early 20th century, Olgino emerged as a prosperous dacha village north of the Russian capital. Among its inhabitants was the poet Korney Chukovsky. Olgino was incorporated into the city of Leningrad in January 1963.

The gated community of "Versailles North" is located in the district.

== Office of trolls ==
From the summer of 2013, there was a base of at least a hundred internet trolls in Olgino, who were paid for distributing messages via the Internet to support Russian propaganda. In October 2014 it became known that the trolls had moved to Savushkina street (Primorskiy district in St. Petersburg).
