= Lakhta-Olgino Municipal Okrug =

Municipal okrug in St. Petersburg, Russia

Coordinates: 60°1′16″N 30°6′15″E

Location of Lakhta-Olgino Municipal Okrug on the 2006 map of St. Petersburg

Lakhta-Olgino Municipal Okrug (Russian: муниципа́льный о́круг Ла́хта-О́льгино) is a municipal okrug of Primorsky District of the federal city of St. Petersburg, Russia, comprising that city's historical areas of Lakhta and Olgino. It is located just north of the Gulf of Finland. Population: 3,903 (2010 census); 2,901 (2002 census).

== Finnish associations ==
The district takes its name from Lake Lakhta, which depending on definition may also be classed as an inlet of the Neva Bay. Lahti is a Finnish word meaning "inlet", and there is a city in Finland also called Lahti. Lakhta is a Russian transliteration of Lahti. The municipality of Lakhta was historically populated with Finns, though it never was part of Finland, as Finland only gained its independence in 1917. By the 1880s approximately 80% of the peasants were Finnish and spoke poor Russian. Lakhta is located on the Karelian isthmus, in Northern Ingria near historic Finnish Karelia.
