= Centerville, St. Mary Parish, Louisiana =

Centerville, Louisiana
- Census-designated place
- Location within Louisiana Location within the United States
- Coordinates: 29°45′35″N 91°25′42″W
- Country: United States
- State: Louisiana
- Parish: St. Mary
- Elevation: 10 ft (3.0 m)

Population (2020)
  - Total: 499
- Time zone: UTC-6 (Central (CST))
  - Summer (DST): UTC-5 (CDT)
- ZIP code: 70522
- Area code: 337
- FIPS code: 22-13925
- GNIS feature ID: 560387

Centerville is an unincorporated community and census-designated place located at the junction of Louisiana Highways 182 and 317 in St. Mary Parish, Louisiana, United States. The community, located on the Bayou Teche, is located 6 miles (9.7 km) southeast of Franklin.

It was first listed as a CDP in the 2020 census with a population of 499.

== History ==
=== Columbian Chemical Plant Explosion Hoax ===
The Columbian Chemicals Plant explosion hoax involved a plant located near Centerville.

== Demographics ==
Historical population
Census	Pop.	Note	%±
2020	499		—
U.S. Decennial Census; 2020

Centerville first appeared as a census designated place in the 2020 U.S. census.

=== 2020 census ===
Centerville CDP, Louisiana – Demographic Profile (NH = Non-Hispanic)
Race / Ethnicity	Pop 2020	% 2020
White alone (NH)	421	84.37%
Black or African American alone (NH)	42	8.42%
Native American or Alaska Native alone (NH)	12	2.40%
Asian alone (NH)	0	0.00%
Pacific Islander alone (NH)	0	0.00%
Some Other Race alone (NH)	8	1.60%
Mixed Race/Multi-Racial (NH)	4	0.80%
Hispanic or Latino (any race)	12	2.40%
Total	499	100.00%

Note: the US Census treats Hispanic/Latino as an ethnic category. This table excludes Latinos from the racial categories and assigns them to a separate category. Hispanics/Latinos can be of any race.

== Education ==
There is one school, Centerville School (K-12) of the St. Mary Parish School Board.

== Notable people ==
- Carl W. Bauer, Louisiana politician
- Thomas G. Clausen, last elected Louisiana state education superintendent from 1984 to 1988, graduated from Centerville High School, c. 1957.
- William J. Seymour, a prominent African-American religious leader in the early twentieth century.
