= Lakhta, Saint Petersburg =

Historical area northwest of St. Petersburg, Russia

Coordinates: 59°59′22.20″N 30°09′37.40″E

Lakhta (Russian: Ла́хта; Finnish: Lahti) is a historical area in Lakhta-Olgino Municipal Okrug of St. Petersburg, Russia, situated west of Lake Lakhta (hence the name). It was formerly owned by Peter the Great, Count Grigory Orlov, and Count Stenbock-Fermor (whose 19th-century residence survives). The Lakhta railway station of the Primorsky Railway connects Lakhta to Central Saint Petersburg. The historical area of Olgino lies south-west of Lakhta.

== History ==
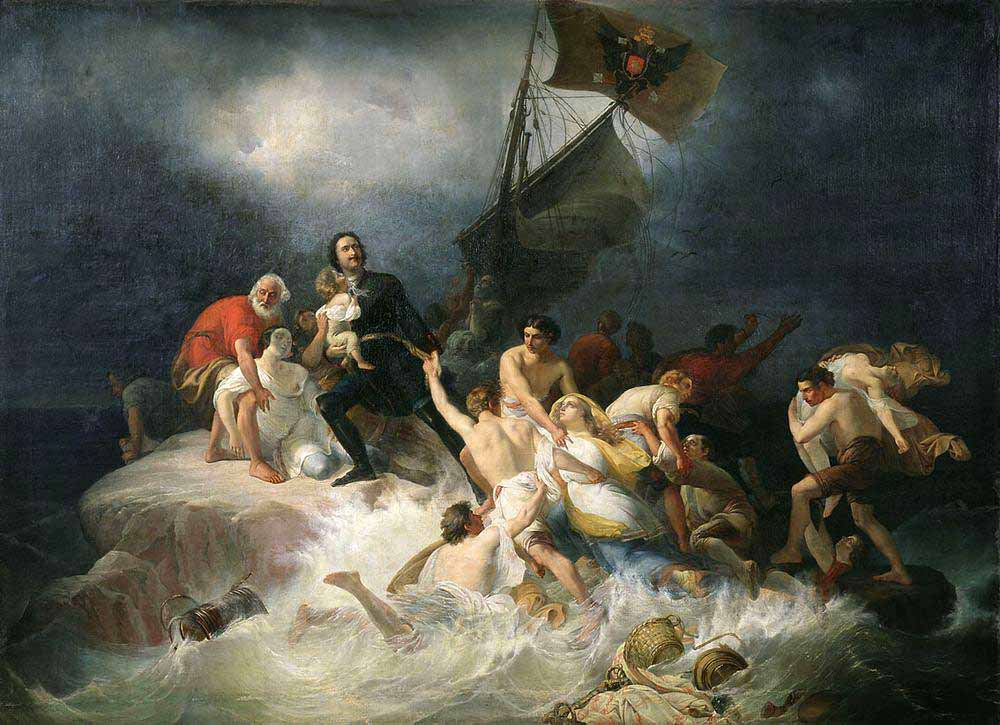
A fanciful version of Peter's rescue by Pyotr Shamshin (1844)

=== Death of Peter the Great ===
In the early 18th century, Peter the Great had a residence in the area called Blizhniye Dubki. According to tradition, in November 1724 Peter was in a ship in the Gulf of Finland near Lakhta to inspect some ironworks. He saw a group of soldiers drowning not far from shore, and, wading out into near-waist deep water, came to their rescue. This icy water rescue is said to have exacerbated Peter's bladder problems and caused his death on January 28, 1725. The event was commemorated in the 19th century by a chapel; and the so-called "Peter's pine" was shown to tourists down to the 20th century.

The story, however, has been viewed with skepticism by some historians, pointing out that the German chronicler Jacob von Stählin is the only source for the story, and it seems unlikely that no one else would have documented such an act of heroism. This, plus the interval of time between these actions and Peter's death seems to preclude any direct link. However, the story may still, in part, contain some grain of truth.

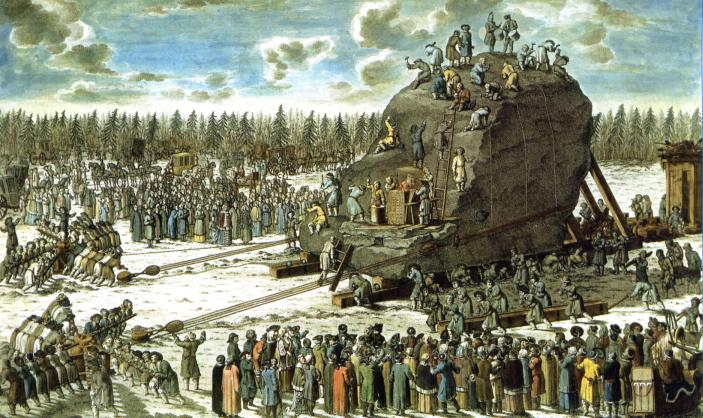
The Transportation of the Thunder-stone in the Presence of Catherine II. Engraving by I. F. Schley of the drawing by Yury Felten. 1770.

=== Later history ===
In 1768, an enormous granite boulder in the nearby forest called the Thunder Stone (Гром-камень) was chosen by Catherine the Great to be the pedestal for an equestrian statue of Peter the Great. The Thunder Stone is the largest rock ever moved by man, even to this day. The statue is now known as The Bronze Horseman, and is one of the landmarks of Saint Petersburg.

Lakhta has also been a centre of Russian sporting firsts. It was host to Russia's first tennis event, and in 1913 a large building was constructed for the lawn tennis club. It also played host to the first soccer cups in Russia.

Lakhta was granted urban-type settlement status and renamed Lakhtinsky (Лахтинский) in 1938. In 1963, it was annexed by Leningrad and became a part of the city.

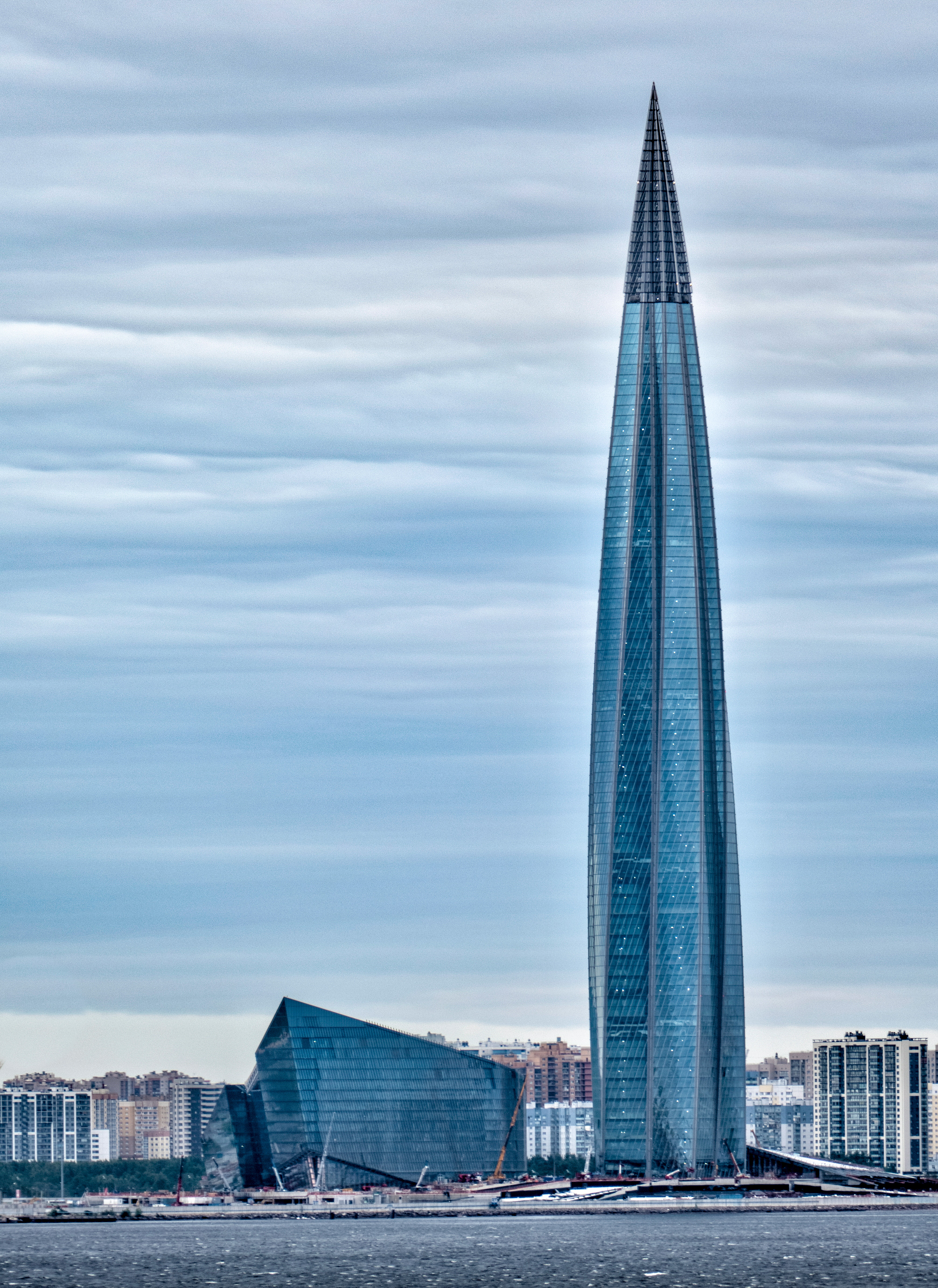
Lakhta Center is home to the tallest building in Europe

In 2011 Gazprom announced it would build business centre in Lakhta called Lakhta Center. Lakhta Center includes the first supertall skyscraper in the city, a scientific and educational complex, sports and leisure facilities and an outdoor amphitheater. The 463-metre (1,519 ft) main tower of Lakhta Center is the tallest building in Russia and Europe as of 2018.
