= Primorsky District, Saint Petersburg =

Primorsky District Приморский район (Russian)
- District
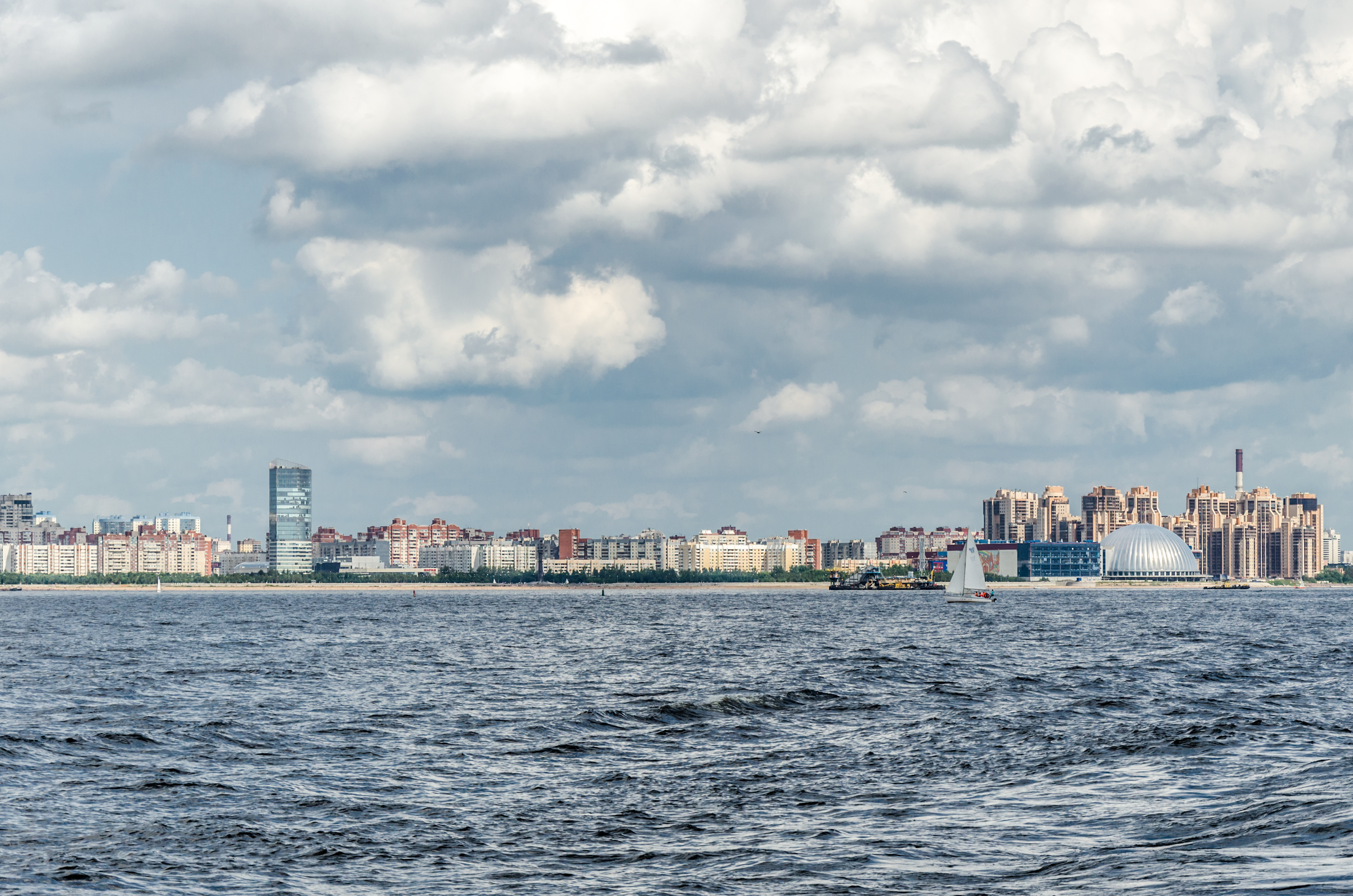
- View of Primorsky District
- Primorsky District in St. Petersburg
- Coordinates: 60°02′N 30°06′E
- Country: Russia
- Federal subject: St. Petersburg
- Established: 1936

Area
  - Total: 109.87 km^{2} (42.42 sq mi)

Population (2010 Census)
  - Total: 507,238
  - Density: 4,616.7/km^{2} (11,957/sq mi)
- Website: http://www.rprim.spb.ru/

Primorsky District (Russian: Примо́рский райо́н "Seaside District") is a district of the federal city of St. Petersburg, Russia. As of the 2010 Census, its population was 507,238; up from 393,960 recorded in the 2002 Census.

== Municipal divisions ==
Primorsky District comprises the municipal settlement of Lisy Nos and the following seven municipal okrugs:

- #65
- Chyornaya rechka
- Kolomyagi
- Komendantsky Aerodrom
- Lakhta-Olgino
- Ozero Dolgoye
- Yuntolovo
