= Zavodskaya Line =

Railway line in Russia

Zavodskaya Line Russian: Заводская линия

Overview
- Status: Local
- Owner: Russian Empire Government
- Locale: Beloostrov
- Termini: Beloostrov; Sestroretsk
- Stations: 2

Service
- Type: Heavy rail
- System: Commuter cargo railroad
- Services: Beloostrov - Sestroretsk
- Operator(s): Russian Empire Government
- Depot(s): Beloostrov
- Rolling stock: Leased from Finnish railways

History
- Opened: May 1916
- Closed: 1920s

Technical
- Line length: 5.4 km (3.36 mi)
- Track gauge: 1,524 mm (5 ft)

The Zavodskaya Line was a freight railway in Russia. The railway was opened in May 1916 for transportation to the Sestroretsk armory. The rolling stock was leased from Finnish railways. The start of World War I was the initial reason for the construction of the railway. The length of the line passed entirely on the territory of the Russia.

== Construction ==
The line partially used old lines from the Sestroretsk spur line:

- In that part where the Sestra river forms the frontier, the railroad tracks go on the Russian side.
- Further, in that part where both coasts are Russian, the line crosses the river at Sestra crossover.
- The Sestroretsk station also lies along the Sestroretsk spur line.

== Closure ==
The line existed for only a brief period. After the Russian Revolution (1917), the Sestroretsk armory practically stopped production, and in the 1920s, there was a complication of relations between the USSR and Finland. The bridge was destroyed, and the line was disassembled.

== Partial re-opening ==
Later, the part of a line from the bridge straight across the Sestra river was restored and was a part of the Sestroretsk direction.
