= 1875 in rail transport =

This article lists events related to rail transport that occurred in 1875.

== Events ==
=== January events ===
- January 1 – The Midland Railway of England abolishes the Second Class passenger category leaving First Class and Third Class. Other British railway companies follow Midland's lead during the rest of the year (Third Class is renamed Second Class in 1956).
- January 7 – The North Pacific Coast Railroad begins narrow gauge railway service north from San Francisco Bay.

=== February events ===
- February 9 – The first train passes through the Hoosac Tunnel in Massachusetts.

=== March events ===
- March 24 – The Mayor of Los Angeles, California, approves a measure to allow the Spring and Sixth Street Railroad, a predecessor of the Pacific Electric Railway, to extend its line to connect to the Southern Pacific Railroad train station.

=== April events ===
- April 26 – Prince Edward Island Railway operates its first regularly scheduled train between Charlottetown and Georgetown.

=== June events ===
- June 1 – Bristol and Exeter Railway in England completes installation of a third rail on its line between Bristol and Taunton, allowing it to operate 4 ft 8 1/2 in (1,435 mm) gauge trains over the line.
- June – The Atchison, Topeka and Santa Fe Railroad purchases the line between Topeka and Kansas City, Kansas.

=== July events ===
- July 29 – Boston, Revere Beach and Lynn Railroad opens in the United States.

=== August events ===
- August 7 – Portland and Ogdensburg Railroad completes construction through the White Mountains (New Hampshire) for what will become the Maine Central Railroad Mountain Division.
- August 30 – Groundbreaking ceremonies are held in Pembroke, Ontario, for the Canada Central Railway line between Pembroke and Renfrew.

=== September events ===
- September 13 – The Atchison, Topeka and Santa Fe Railroad, building westward from Kansas, reaches Las Animas, Colorado.
- September 27 – Railway Jubilee at Darlington in England (in honour of the Stockton and Darlington Railway).

=== November events ===
- November 18 – Bristol and Exeter Railway in England completes the gauge conversion from 7 ft (2,134 mm) to 4 ft 8 1/2 in (1,435 mm) of its Cheddar Valley line from Yatton to Wells.

=== December events ===
- December 1 – The American labor organization Brotherhood of Locomotive Firemen is founded.
- December – The initial parts of construction begin on the Bergen Line in Norway.

=== Unknown date events ===
- Engineer and inventor Fyodor Pirotsky experimentally introduces electric trams near Miller's pier station on Miller's line of railway at Sestroretsk near Saint Petersburg in the Russian Empire, using the running rails to provide current, the world's first railway electrification.
- Cize–Bolozon viaduct opens across the Ain in France.
- First Caspar Lumber Company steam locomotive begins operation on what will become the Caspar, South Fork and Eastern Railroad.

== Births ==
=== May births ===
- May 9 – H. P. M. Beames, Chief Mechanical Engineer of the London and North Western Railway 1920–1922 (d. 1948).

=== September births ===
- September 26 – Eric Geddes, first Minister of Transport (U.K.) 1919–1921 (d. 1937).

== Deaths ==
=== January deaths ===
- January 18 – William H. Aspinwall, American financier who helped build the Panama Railway (b. 1807).
