= Sestroretsk (disambiguation) =

Sestroretsk is a municipal town in jurisdiction of St. Petersburg, Russia.

Sestroretsk may also refer to:

- Sestroretsk railway station, a railway station in Sestroretsk
- Sestroretsk railway station (1871-1924), an old railway station closed in 1924
