= 1871 in rail transport =

This article lists events related to rail transport that occurred in 1871.

== Events ==
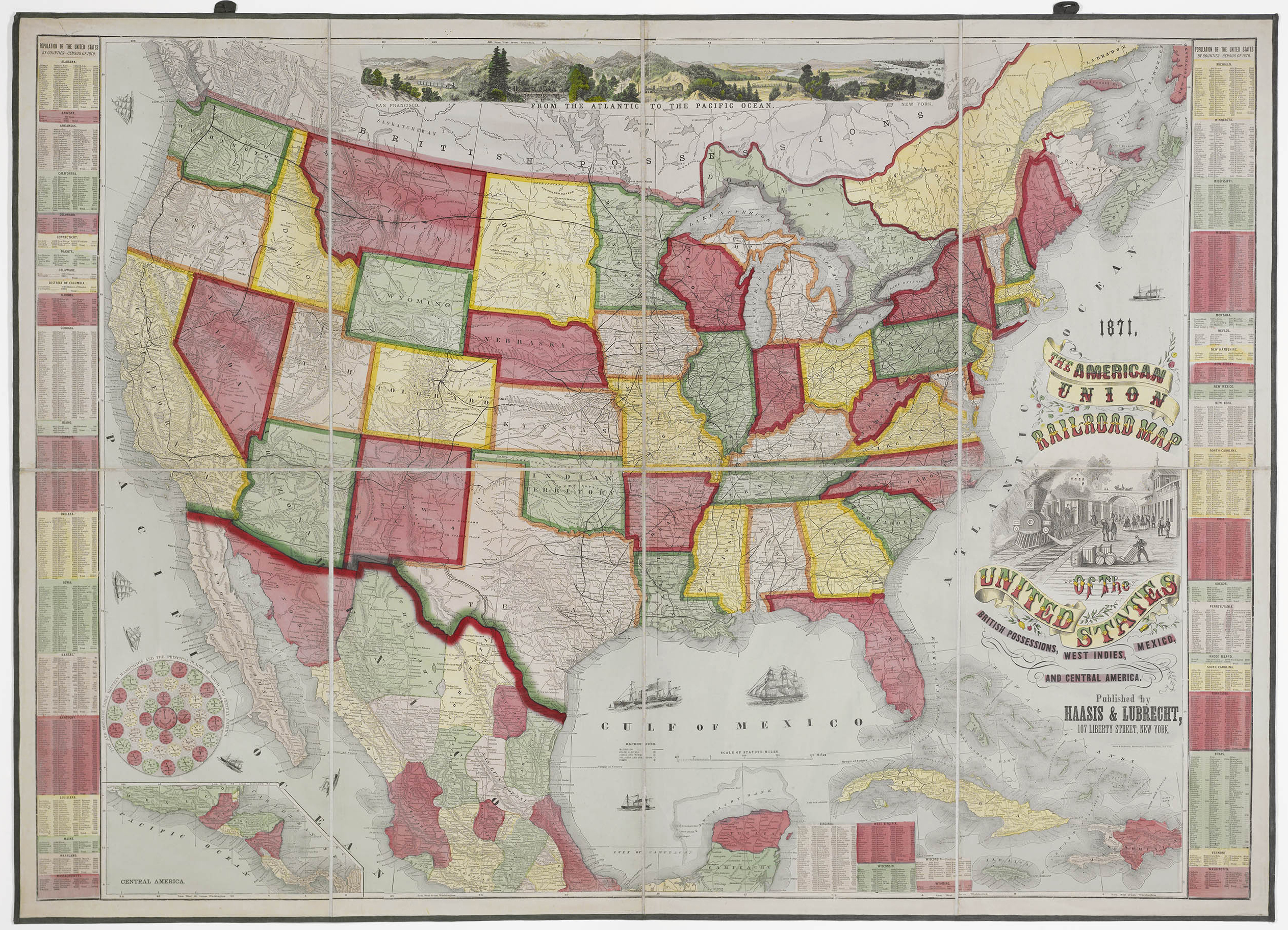
Haasis & Lubrecht, American Union Railroad Map, 1871

=== February events ===
- February 10 – Launceston & Western Railway opens as the first line in Tasmania, Australia, 45 mi (72 km) 1,600 mm (5 ft 3 in) gauge between Deloraine and Launceston.

=== June events ===
- June 8 – Devon & Somerset Railway opens its line to Wiveliscombe.
- June 18 – The canton of Basel-Landschaft grants a concession for the construction of a narrow gauge railway from Liestal to Waldenburg, Switzerland and eventually further to Langenbruck.

=== July events ===
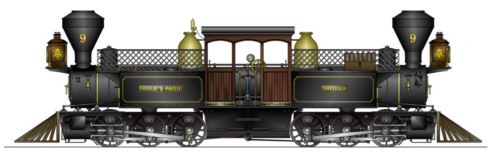
Toronto & Nipissing Fairlie 0-6-6-0 No. 9 Shedden built in England by Avonside of Bristol, 1871

- July 12 – The first narrow gauge railway in North America, the Toronto and Nipissing Railway, using a track gauge of 1,067 mm (3 ft 6 in), opens to Uxbridge.
- July 22 – The Canada Central Railway holds an official groundbreaking ceremony at Renfrew for the railroad's section between there and Sand Point, Ontario.

=== August events ===
- August 5 – The New Haven & Derby Railroad, a predecessor of the New Haven Railroad in Connecticut, opens between New Haven and Derby Junction (Ansonia).
- August 21 – The Valley Railway in Ohio in the United States is founded.
- August 24 – Hans Gløersen publishes the first documented idea of building a railway between Norway's two largest cities, Bergen and Oslo, in the newspaper Bergensposten.

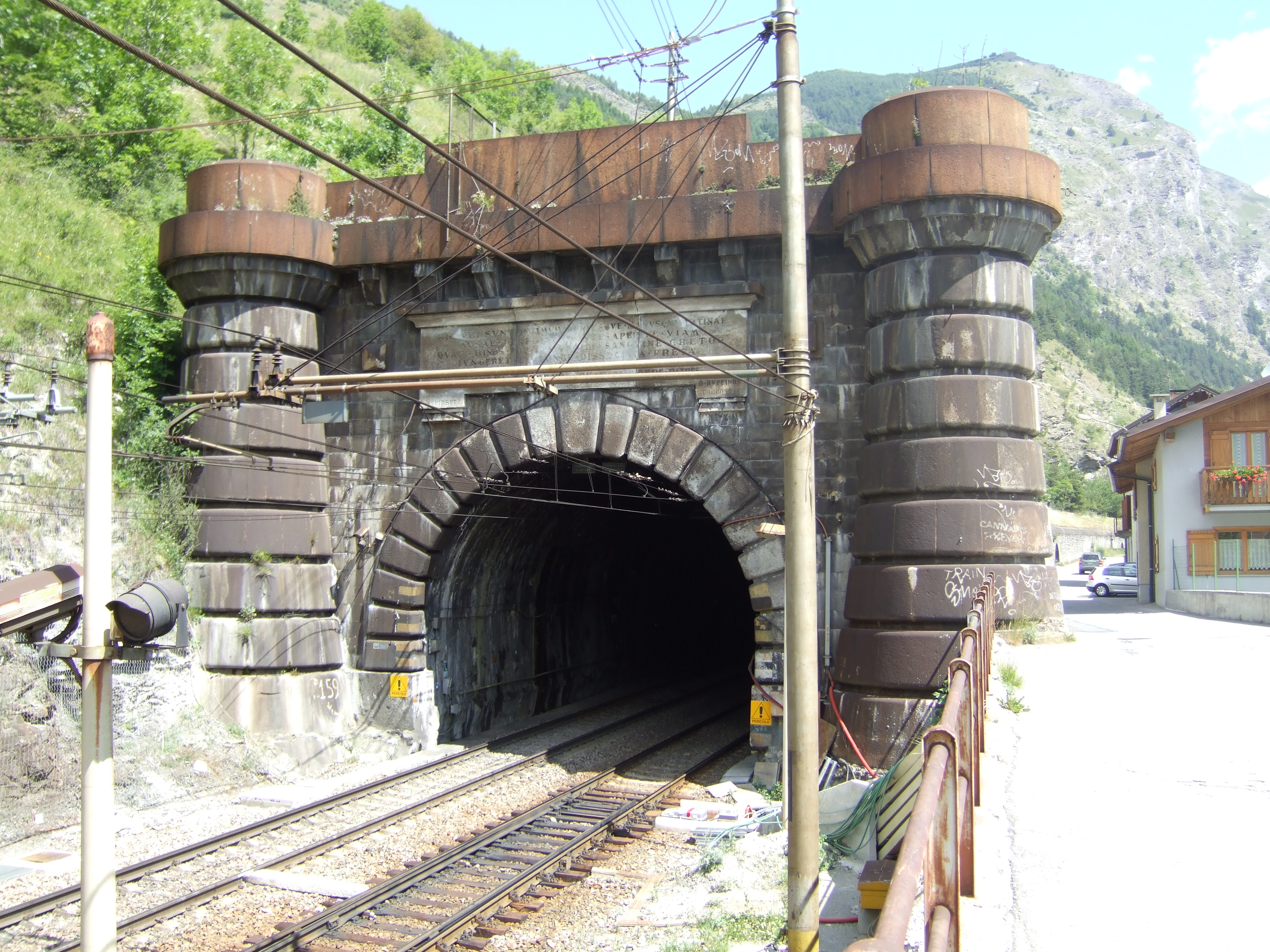
Fréjus Tunnel entrance from Italian side (Bardonecchia)

- August 26 – The Eastern Railroad An express train crashes into the rear of a local at the tiny Revere station, killing 29 and injuring 57. Either a station-to-station telegraph system, or the Westinghouse air braking system, could have prevented this accident. Public outrage, lawsuits and regulations after this crash finally forces most railroads in America to install both.

=== September events ===
- September 17 – The Fréjus (or Mont Cenis) Tunnel (13.7 km (8.5 mi)) is opened carrying the Fréjus railway beneath Mont Cenis in the Alps and connecting Modane, France and Bardonecchia, Italy.
- September 18 – The second narrow gauge railway in North America, the Toronto, Grey and Bruce Railway, using a track gauge of 1,067 mm (3 ft 6 in), opens to Orangeville, Ontario.

=== October events ===
- October – Portland gauge European & North American Railway is completed linking New England to the Maritimes.

=== November events ===
- November 2 – The Riihimäki–Saint Petersburg railway opens a spur line from Beloostrov to Sestroretsk railway station in the Russian Empire.

=== Unknown date events ===
- The United New Jersey Railroad and Canal Company, which owns the assets of the first railroad built in New Jersey (the Camden & Amboy Railroad), is merged into the Pennsylvania Railroad
- The Richmond and Danville Railroad acquires the North Carolina Railroad.
- The owners of the Wilmington & Raleigh Railroad and the Wilmington & Manchester Railroad begin using the name Atlantic Coast Line in advertising to describe the two railroads.
- The Atchison, Topeka & Santa Fe Railroad reaches Dodge City, Kansas.
- The Portland gauge Maine Central Railroad converts to a standard gauge mainline from Portland to Bangor after leasing the standard gauge Portland and Kennebec Railroad.
- Mason Bogie locomotive introduced in the United States by William Mason (locomotive builder).
- Ensign Manufacturing Company, later to become part of American Car & Foundry, is founded in Huntington, West Virginia.
- Swiss Locomotive & Machine Works established in Winterthur by English engineer Charles Brown.
- Rebuilding of Zürich Hauptbahnhof in Switzerland completed.

== Births ==
=== October births ===
- October 7 – Robert Whitelegg, locomotive superintendent for London, Tilbury & Southend Railway 1910–1912, and for Glasgow & South Western Railway 1918–1923, general manager of Beyer, Peacock & Company 1923–1929 (d. 1957).

== Deaths ==
=== September deaths ===
- September 6 – John A. Poor, American entrepreneur, advocate of the Portland gauge (b. 1808).
- September 8 – Robert B. Dockray, civil engineer on the London and Birmingham Railway in England (b. 1811).

=== October deaths ===
- October 18 – Joseph Hamilton Beattie, locomotive engineer for London and South Western Railway 1850–1871 (b. 1808).

=== November deaths ===
- November 5 – Edmund Morel, English-born civil engineer in Japan (b. 1840).

=== December deaths ===
- December 14 – George Hudson, English railway financier, "The Railway King" (b. 1800).

== Bibliography ==
- Blakeslee, Philip C., A Brief History Lines West Of The New York, New Haven and Hartford Railroad Co.. Retrieved August 4, 2005.
- Lane, Samuel A. (1892). Fifty Years and Over of Akron and Summit County. Akron, Ohio: Beacon Job Dept.
- "Narrow Gauge Through the Bush – Ontario's Toronto Grey and Bruce and Toronto and Nipissing Railways"; Rod Clarke; pub. Beaumont and Clarke, with the Credit Valley Railway Company, Streetsville, Ontario, 2007. ISBN 978-0-9784406-0-2
- "The Narrow Gauge For Us – The Story of the Toronto and Nipissing Railway"; Charles Cooper; pub. The Boston Mills Press; Erin, Ontario, 1982.
- "Narrow Gauge Railways of Canada"; Omer Lavallee; pub. Railfair, Montreal, 1972.
- "Narrow Gauge Railways of Canada"; Omer Lavallee, expanded and revised by Ronald S Ritchie; pub. Fitzhenry and Whiteside, Markham, Ontario, 2005.
- Ohio Commissioner of Railroads and Telegraphs (1883). Annual Report of the Commissioner of Railroads and Telegraphs of Ohio for the Year Ending June 30, 1882. Columbus, Ohio: Myers Brothers, State Printers. hdl:2027/uc1.b2896936.
- (April 3, 2005), Significant dates in Canadian railway history. Retrieved July 10, 2005.
- (July 5, 2005), Significant dates in Ottawa railway history. Retrieved July 18, 2005.
