= Miller's line =

Railway line in Russia

Miller's railway
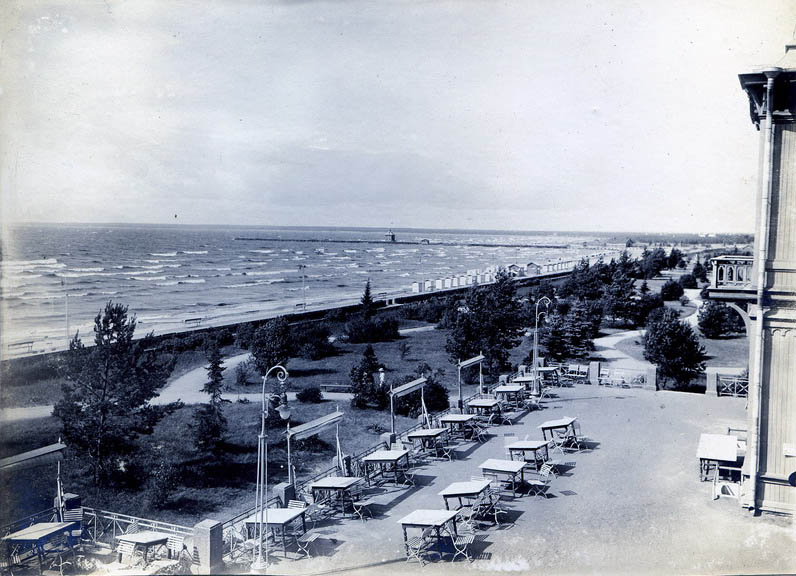
- The railway and station on the sea coast at Miller's pier

Overview
- Native name: Железная дорога Миллера
- Status: Defunct
- Owner: Moritz von-Dezen and Michael Ivanovich Miller
- Locale: Saint Petersburg
- Termini: Sestroretsk; Beloostrov or Miller's pier
- Stations: 3

Service
- Type: Regional rail
- Operator: Societies of the Sestroretsk railway
- Rolling stock: Leased from Finnish State Railways

History
- Opened: 1873
- Succeed by: Zavodskaya Line
- Closed: 1886

Technical
- Line length: 9.5 km (5.9 mi)
- Track gauge: 1,524 mm (5 ft)

Societies of the Sestroretsk railway
- Russian: частное "Общество Сестрорецкой железной дороги"
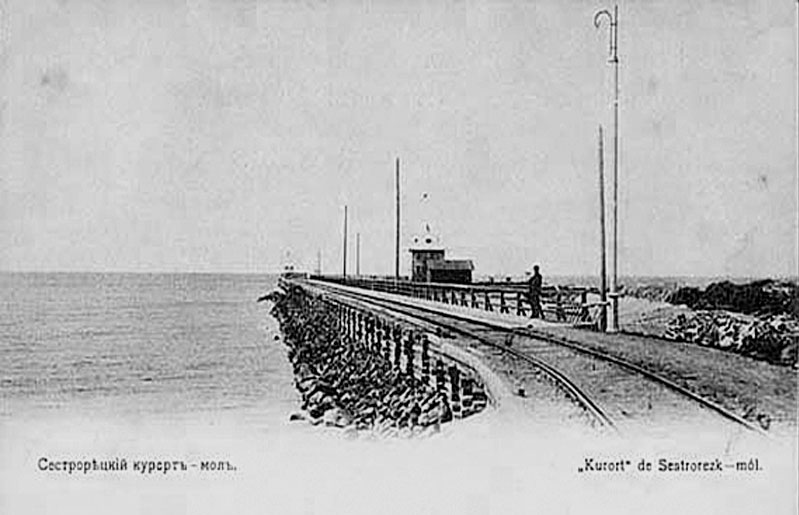
- Miller's pier railway station

Overview
- Headquarters: Sestroretsk
- Locale: Saint Petersburg
- Dates of operation: 1873–1886
- Predecessor: Finnish State Railways
- Successor: Primorskaya Railway

Technical
- Track gauge: 1,524 mm (5 ft)
- Length: 9.5 km (5.9 mi)

Miller's line was a passenger railway line in Russia from 1873 to 1886, run by the Finnish State Railways. The line ran from Beloostrov to Sestroretsk, and was used for electrical tests in the 1870s.

== Organisation ==
The private organisation Societies of the Sestroretsk Railway was established to control the railway, headed by Collegiate Assessor Moritz von-Dezen and Titular counsellor Michael Ivanovich Miller. It had been built for the military as the Sestroretsk spur line.

There were plans to build a station 3 versts (approximately 3 km (1.9 mi)) from Sestroretsk, on the bank of Sestroretsk Bay, and also an additional branch line to the Tarhovsky pier, where an operational station already existed.

== Experiments with electrification ==
In 1875–6, on an area between Miller's pier and Sestroretsk rail station, the engineer Fyodor Pirotsky experimented on the ability of the track to transmit electrogalvanic current. These experiments later led to a patent "On the Electric Method of Transmitting Power along Rail and Other Conductors". The experimental area consisted of a section 3.5 versts (3.7 km; 2.3 mi) long, which passed along the beach for a large part of its length.

The system used the rails as conductors for electricity transmission; one rail carried the direct current, and the second rail functioned as a return wire. The transmission of current was successful, with an electric motor being powered by a steam-powered generator located 1 verst (1.1 km; 0.66 mi) away. Pirotsky stated that current leakage to the earth was negligible, and the transfer efficiency was calculated to be acceptable. Expenses for the adaptation of existing railways to electricity transmission were determined to be insignificant – from 50 to 100 roubles per verst.

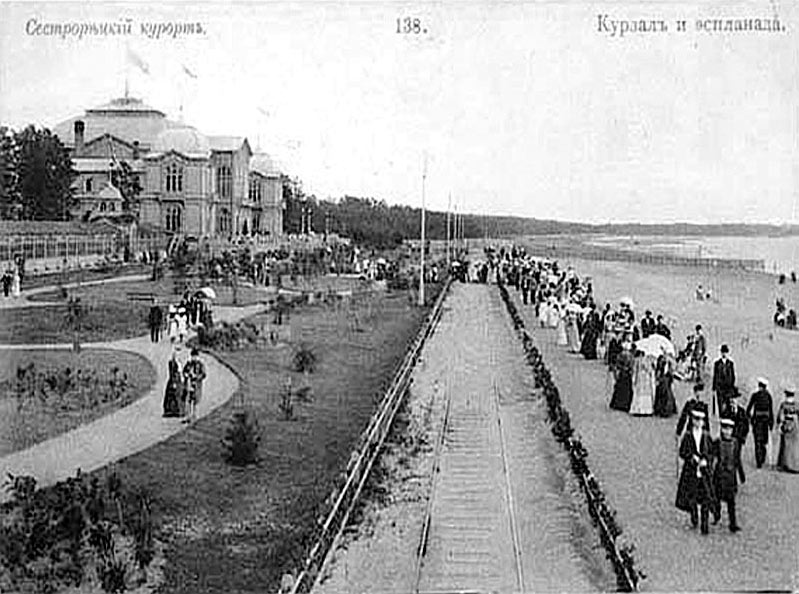
Location on Miller's line where Fyodor Pirotsky's experiments took place

In September 1880, Pirotsky's system was tested in Saint Petersburg using a converted horse-drawn tramcar. The tests were successful, however lobbying by owners of the horse trams meant no tramways in the city were converted to electric traction.

== Closure ==
In 1877, the line operated four pairs of trains. They primarily served residents during the summer period, while in the winter they were only used by officials.

The recorded volume of patronage was very insignificant because of a disputed tariff policy of Finnish railways, and ultimately the Miller's pier station was left idle. As a result, the operators appeared to be in a disastrous financial position, and the majority of the proposed plans were left incomplete.

By the mid-1880s, the Society of the Sestroretsk railway was definitively ruined, and on January 1, 1886, the railway was closed.

== See also ==
- Sestroretsk spur line
