= Sestroretsk spur line =

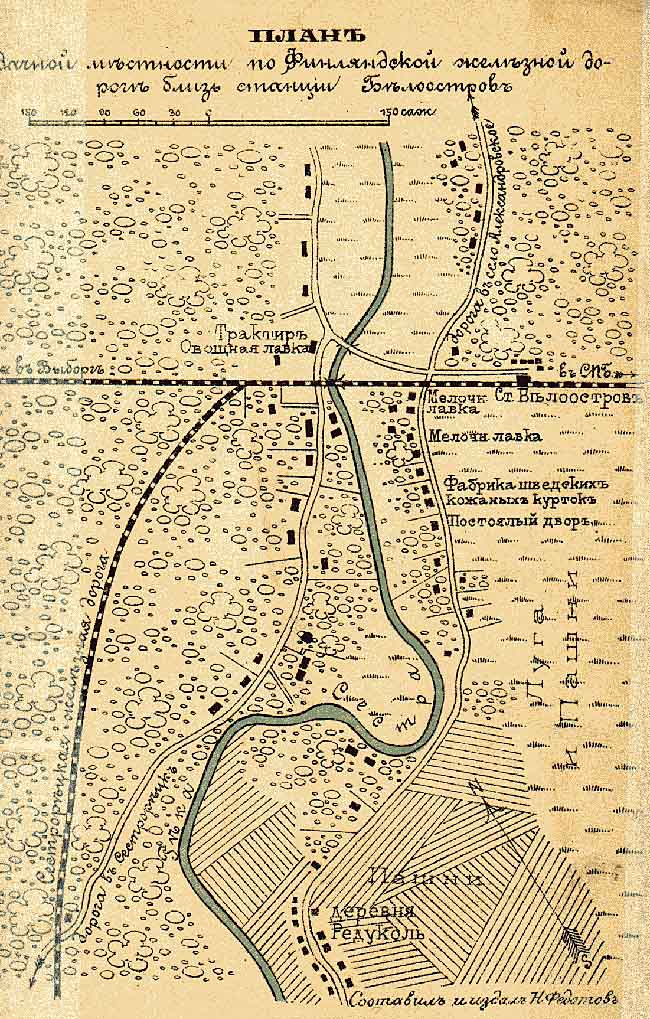
Map of an adjunction of a branch to the main railway

The Sestroretsk spur line was laid by request of the Russian Ministry of Defence for communication of the Sestroretsk armory with the strategic Riihimäki-Saint Petersburg railway in 1871. The line was opened on 2 November 1871, when the first train proceeded on the route from Beloostrov to Sestroretsk.

== Timetable ==
In 1872 the schedule of trains of the Sestroretsk branch was published in the city directory. From Beloostrov went three pairs trains: in the morning, in the afternoon and in the evening. The time taken for the 6.6 kilometre journey was 25 minutes, giving an average speed of less than 16 kilometres per hour.

== Miller's line ==
A study in 1872 had shown the line was unprofitable and in 1873 the administration decided to close it. These plans became known to entrepreneurs in Sestroretsk and they bought the line from Finnish railways. The new line was the private "Societies of the Sestroretsk railway" and was named Miller's line after Michael Ivanovich Miller. Miller's line was not fully independent, as the rolling stock was rented from Finnish railways.
