= Sestroretsk railway station (1871–1924) =

Sestroretsk Сестрорецк
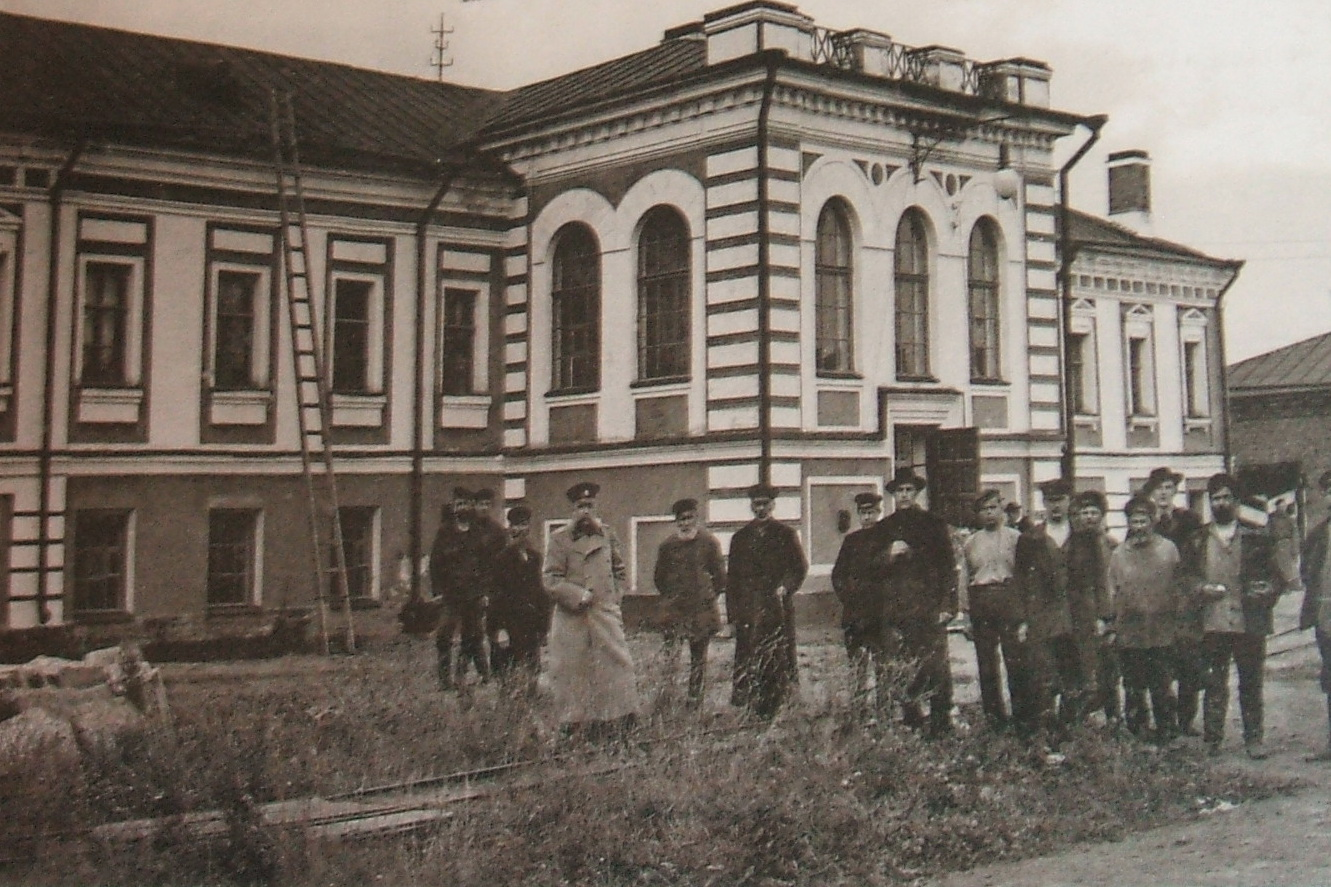
- Sestroretsk railway station in 1900.

General information
- Location: 2, Voskova street, Sestroretsk; Saint Petersburg; Russia
- Coordinates: 60°5′54″N 29°58′5″E
- Tracks: 2

Construction
- Structure type: At-grade
- Architectural style: Swedish architecture

Other information
- Status: Defunct

History
- Opened: 2 November 1871
- Closed: mid-1920
- Original company: Finnish State Railways (1871–1873); Societies of the Sestroretsk railway (1873–1886)

Former services
Preceding station	Primorskaya Railway	Following station
Beloostrov Terminus	Sestroretsk spur line	Terminus
Location

Sestroretsk railway station (Russian: ста́нция Сестроре́цк, stantsiya Sestroretsk) was a railway station in Sestroretsk, Russia handling transportation to northern destinations including Beloostrov and Sestroretsk.

The station was built by Finnish State Railways as the railhead feeder of Riihimäki–Saint Petersburg railway. It was designed by Swedish architects and it opened on 2 November 1871, when the station's first train arrived from Beloostrov. The Sestroretsk spur line was constructed to serve Sestroretsk armory.

== History ==
The station was owned and operated by Finnish railways from 1871 to 1873. From 1873 to 1886 it was operated by the private "Societies of the Sestroretsk railway". This company built a new railway line, which was called Miller's line, and connected to the station at Miller's pier. The organization was devastated in the mid-1880s and, on 1 January 1886, the station was closed along with the branch.

In 1914, World War I began. Sestroretsk armory was a leading defensive factory and it was necessary to connect it with the country's railway system. In 1916, the station was restored as a freight terminal.

The line did not exist for long. After the revolution Sestroretsk armory had practically stopped production and, in the 1920s, there was a complication of relations between the USSR and Finland. The bridge was blown up and the line was disassembled.

Later, the part of the line from the bridge straight across the Sestra river was restored and was a part of the Sestroretsk direction. In 1924, a new line was constructed but bypassed this station. The platforms, buildings, and structures were taken down to allow the building of new houses on Volodarsky street. The old station was replaced by a new Sestroretsk railway station.
