= Fyodor Pirotsky =

Russian engineer

Fyodor Apollonovich Pirotsky
- Фёдор Аполлонович Пироцкий
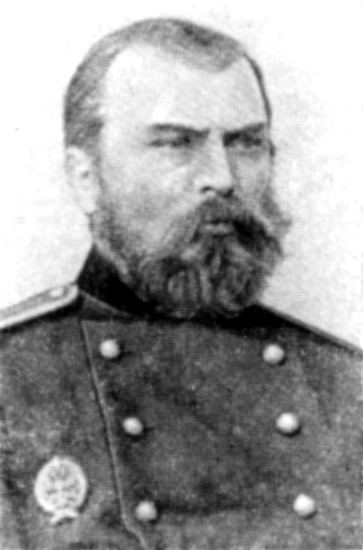
- picture taken in 1898
- Born: February 17 [O.S. March 1] 1845; Sencha village, Lokhvitsky Uyezd, Poltava Governorate
- Died: February 28 [O.S. March 12] 1898 (aged 53); Alyoshki, Dneprovsky Uyezd, Taurida Governorate
- Occupations: Engineer, inventor

Fyodor Apollonovich Pirotsky (Russian: Фёдор Аполлонович Пироцкий; 17 February [O.S. 5 February] 1845 – 28 February [O.S. 16 February] 1898), or Fedir Apollonovych Pirotskyy (Ukrainian: Федір Аполлонович Піроцький) was a Russian engineer of Ukrainian ancestry, inventor of the world's first railway electrification system and electric tram While the commercialization of his inventions in the Russian Empire was relatively slow, Pirotsky is known to have met with Carl Heinrich von Siemens and influenced Siemens' eventual introduction of the first regular electric tram line (for the Berlin Straßenbahn).

== Biography ==
Pirotsky was born into the family of a military physician in the Lokhvytsky Uezd of the Poltava Governorate, in the Russian Empire (modern day Lokhvytsia, in the Poltava Oblast of Ukraine). His family was of Cossack ancestry.

Pirotsky received his education at Saint Petersburg, where he graduated from the Konstantinovsky Cadet Corps and Mikhailovskaya Military Artillery Academy in 1866, and served in Kiev with the Fortress Artillery. While stationed in Kiev Pirotsky became a friend of the famous Russian electrical engineer Pavel Yablochkov and an enthusiast for applications of electrical energy.

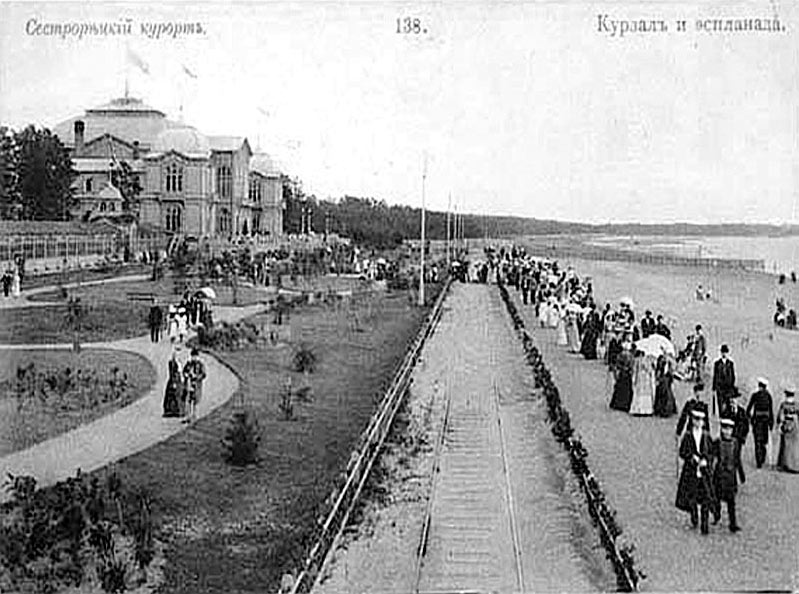
Place on Miller's railway line in which the first tram Pirotsky was tested

== Work ==
In 1871, Pirotsky moved back to Saint Petersburg, where among other things he proposed a new type of blast furnace. In 1874, he started experiments on Volkov Field in Saint Petersburg, and in 1875 experimented at the Sestroretsk railway Miller's line (not far from the station Miller's pier). The electricity was transferred over a distance of approximately one kilometer in order to power an electric motor. In his design, rails were connected to a Gramme generator. Both rails were isolated from the ground, one rail served as a direct conductor and one as a reverse conductor.

In 1880, he modified a city two-decker horse tramway to be powered by electricity instead of horses, and on 3 September [O.S. 22 August] 1880 the unusual form of public transport started to serve residents of Saint Petersburg amid the vocal protests of the owners of the horsecars. The experiments continued until the end of September 1880. Some historians claim that this was the first electric tram in the world. Pirotsky did not have the money to continue his experiments, but his works stirred interest in electric trams around the world. Among people who met Pirotsky was Carl Heinrich von Siemens who was very interested and asked many questions. In 1881, the brothers Siemens started producing their own design of electric trams commercially. The first permanent electric tram line using Siemens tram cars was opened in Berlin in 1881 and the first permanent tram line in the Russian Empire was opened in Kiev in 1892. As often happens with talented people, Pirotsky was underestimated during his lifetime. Despite his famous inventions, he was sent to the Ivangorod Fortress, where in 1888 he was dismissed early with the rank of colonel. All this happened about five months before the end of 25 years of military service, which allowed him to receive the maximum pension.

Pirotsky continued to serve as an artillery officer of the Imperial Russian Army. Among other things, he installed the first underground electric cable in Saint Petersburg to transfer electricity from a cannon foundry to the Artillery School (1881). He also was the author of a project for centralizing the city's electricity production using underground cables, he proposed new constructions of blast furnaces and bakery ovens. In 1888, he retired with the rank of colonel, lived on his military pension in the town of Alyoshki (today Oleshky, Kherson Oblast, Ukraine) where he died in 1898. Since no money was found on him when he died, the burial was paid for by a credit secured by the colonel's furniture.

== Sources ==
- Belkind L. D., Konfederatov I. Ya., Shneyberg Ya. A. (Белькинд Л. Д., Конфедератов И. Я., Шнейберг Я. А.), История техники, М.— Л. (History of Engineering, Moscow-Leningrad), 1956 (in Russian).
