= 1854 in rail transport =

This article lists events related to rail transport that occurred in 1854.

== Events ==
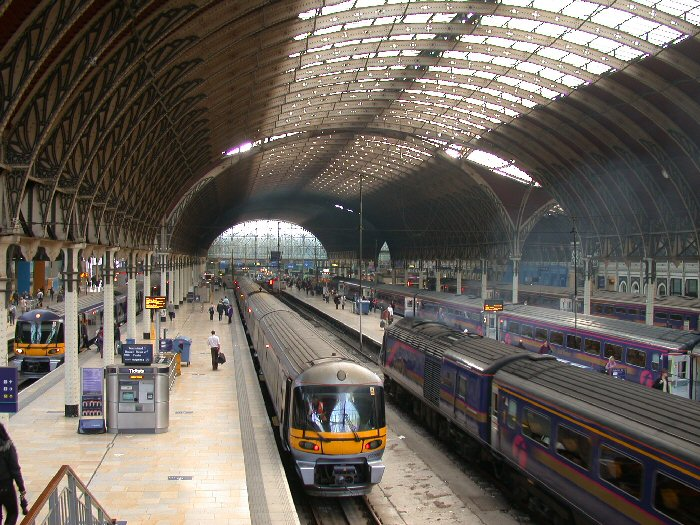
Brunel's 1854 train shed survives at London Paddington station

=== January events ===
- January 16 – The permanent London Paddington station, designed by Isambard Kingdom Brunel for the Great Western Railway of England, is opened.
- January 20 – The North Carolina General Assembly in the United States charters the Atlantic and North Carolina Railroad to run from Goldsboro through New Bern to the newly created seaport of Morehead City near Beaufort.

=== February events ===
- February 15 – Pennsylvania Railroad's Horseshoe Curve near Altoona, Pennsylvania, opens for railroad traffic.
- February 22 – Chicago & Rock Island Railroad opens throughout to Rock Island, Illinois, making it the first railroad to connect Chicago with the Mississippi River.

=== April events ===
- April 30 – Opening of first railway in Brazil, running 16 km (9.9 mi) inland from Mauá on 1,676 mm (5 ft 6.0 in) gauge.

=== May events ===
- May 15 – Opening of railway over the Semmering Pass in Austria.

=== June events ===
- 1 June – Birmingham New Street station is opened in Birmingham, England.
- June – The Grand Excursion takes prominent Eastern United States inhabitants from Chicago to Rock Island, Illinois, by railroad, then up the Mississippi River to St. Paul, Minnesota, by steamboat.

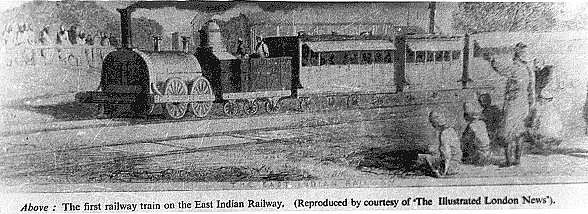
First train of East Indian Railway

=== July events ===
- July 1 – The Harcourt Street railway line opens between Dublin and Bray, Ireland.
- July 3 – The Brooklyn City Railroad, the oldest streetcar line in Brooklyn, New York, opens for passenger service.

=== August events ===
- August 12 – The first section of what is now Belgian railway line 161 opens connecting Brussels-Luxembourg and La Hulpe stations.
- August 15 – First section of East Indian Railway opens, from Howrah to Hooghly (37 km).
- August 20 – The first trains operate in what is now Romania between Oraviţa, Transylvania, and Baziaş, on the Danube.
- August 21 – The Great Western Railway of Canada opens its Galt Branch.
- August 28 – The Somerset Central Railway opens and is leased to the Bristol and Exeter Railway for a seven-year term.

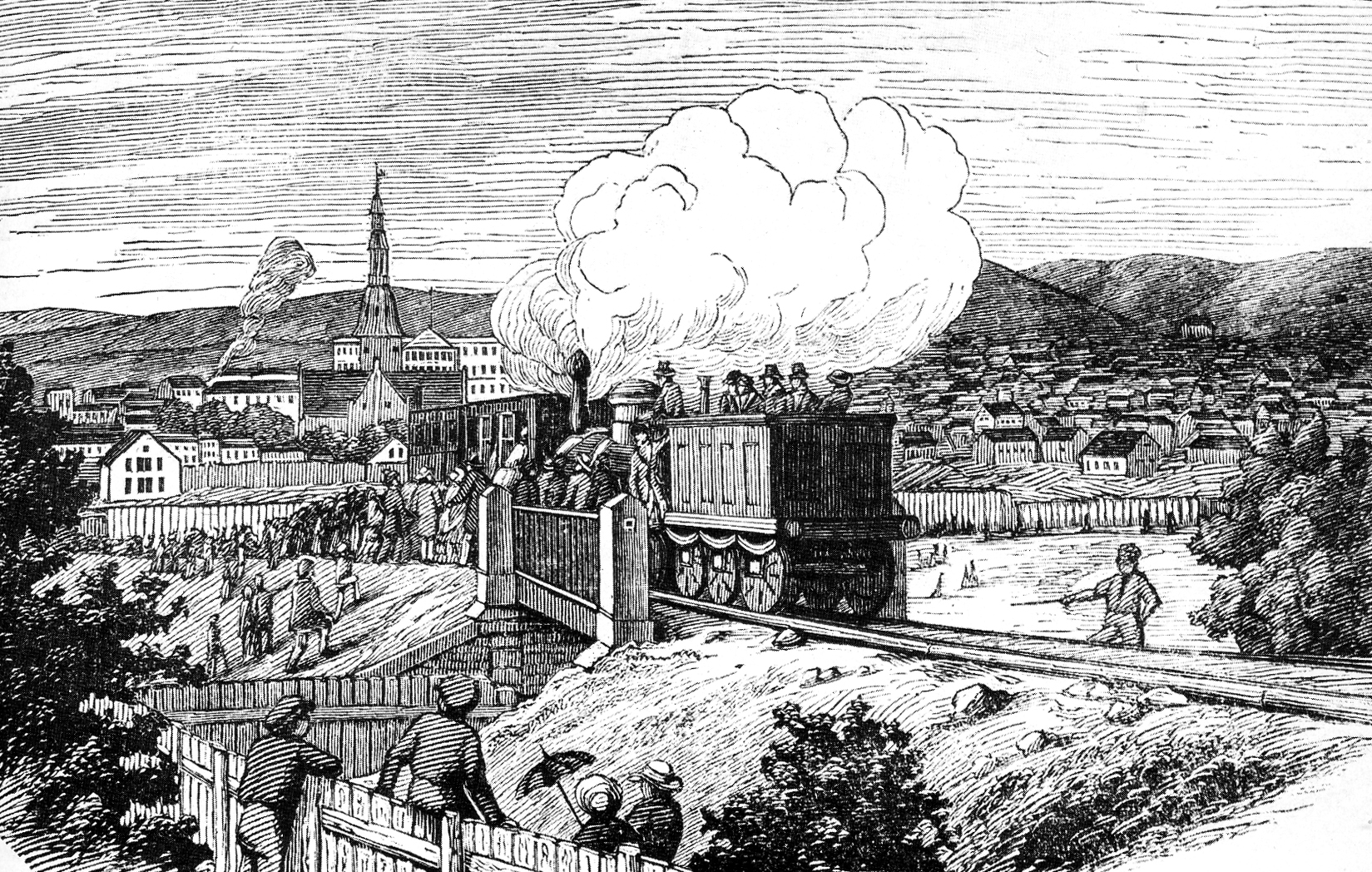
Hovedjernbanen, first line in Norway

=== September events ===
- September 1 – Opening of first railway in Norway, the Hovedjernbanen, from Christiania (Oslo) to Eidsvoll (67.6 km).
- September 12 – Opening of first steam railway in Australia, the Melbourne and Hobson's Bay Railway Company's Port Melbourne line, from Melbourne Terminus to Sandridge on 1,600 mm (5 ft 3 in) gauge.
- September 20 – The Great North of Scotland Railway operates its first passenger train over the 39-mile (63 km) route from Kittybrewster, in Aberdeen, to Huntly.

=== October events ===
- October 20 – Kingston Locomotive Works, the predecessor of the Canadian Locomotive Company, completes construction of its first steam locomotive.
- October 25 – The Carillon and Grenville Railway, in Canada, opens.

=== November events ===
- November 13 – Opening London Necropolis railway station at Waterloo, London, a special railway station constructed by the London Necropolis Company for funeral trains.

=== Unknown date events ===
- Opening of first section of railway in Africa, the Middle East and the Ottoman Empire, between Alexandria and Kafr el-Zayyat in Egypt.
- Aretas Blood purchases the steam locomotive manufacturing business of Amoskeag Locomotive Works and folds it into Manchester Locomotive Works.
- Henry Farnam becomes president of the Chicago, Rock Island and Pacific Railroad.

== Births ==
=== January births ===
- January 6 – William N. Page, American civil engineer, builder of the Chesapeake and Ohio Railway and the Virginian Railway (d. 1932).

=== February births ===
- February 14 – Job A. Edson, president of Kansas City Southern Railway 1905–1918 and 1920–1927 (d. 1928).

=== December births ===
- December 26 – Charles Frederick Crocker, son of Charles Crocker of California's Big Four railroaders, president of San Joaquin and Sierra Nevada Railroad, vice president of Southern Pacific Railroad (d. 1897).

== Deaths ==
=== February deaths ===
- February 19 – Whitmell P. Tunstall, first president of the Richmond and Danville Railroad (b. 1810).
