= Pendulum car =

Experimental tilting train

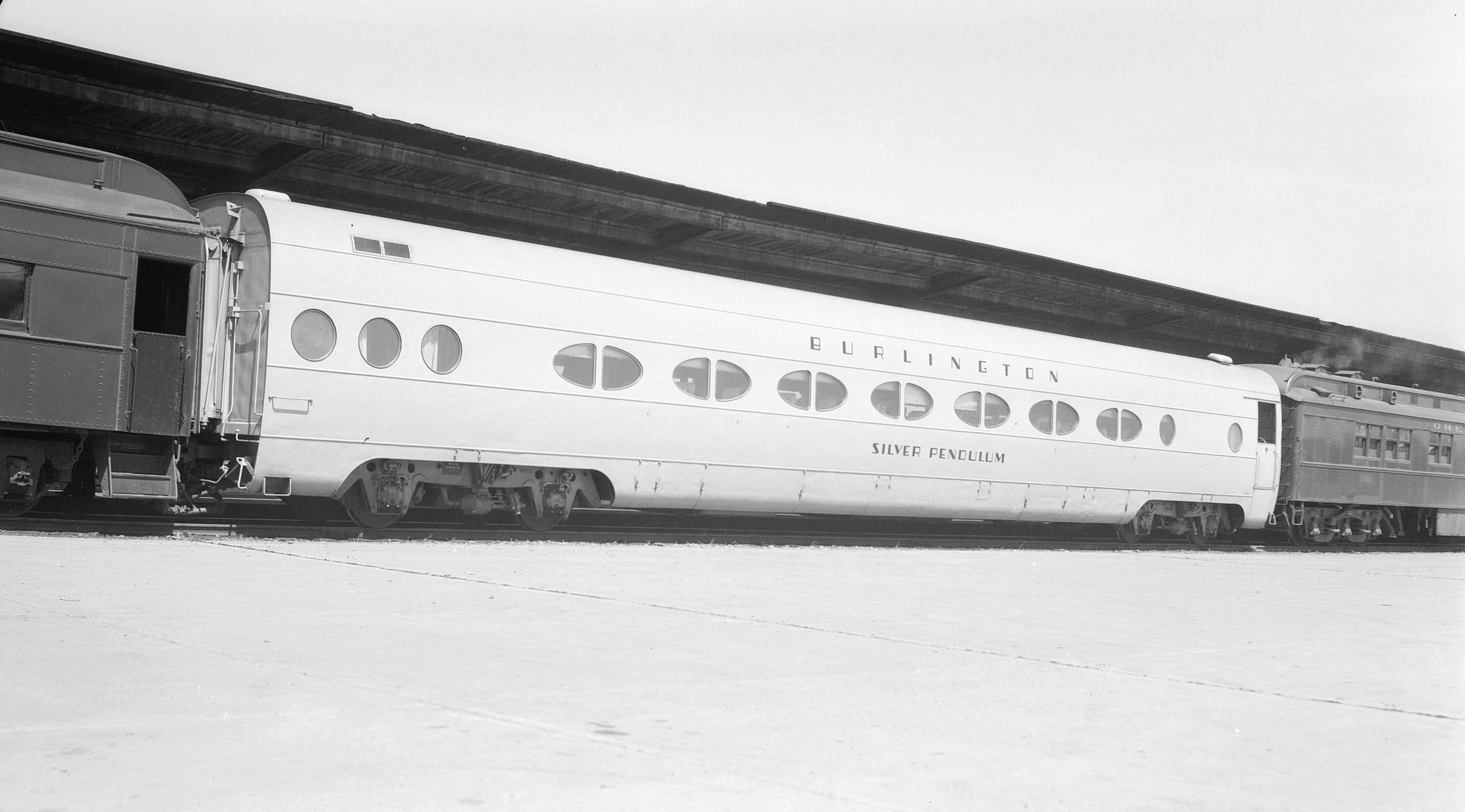
- CB&Q No. 6000, the Silver Pendulum
- Manufacturer: Pacific Railway Equipment Company
- Constructed: 1941–1942
- Number built: 3
- Capacity: 56–68
- Operators: Atchison, Topeka and Santa Fe Railway; Chicago, Burlington and Quincy Railroad; Great Northern Railway

Specifications
- Car length: 85 feet (26 m)
- Wheel diameter: 36 in (910 mm)
- Weight: 109,000 lb (49,000 kg)
- HVAC: Electro-mechanical air conditioning
- Bogies: Coiled spring suspension
- Track gauge: 4 ft 8 1/2 in (1,435 mm)

The pendulum car was an experimental tilting coach built by the Pacific Railway Equipment Company (PERC) in the early 1940s. It used an innovative coiled spring suspension system that allowed the cars to lean into curves, thus increasing passenger comfort during high speed travel. PERC built three cars which were tested on American railroads throughout the 1940s, but the advent of World War II, and their high cost relative to conventional equipment, prevented their wider adoption.

== Design ==
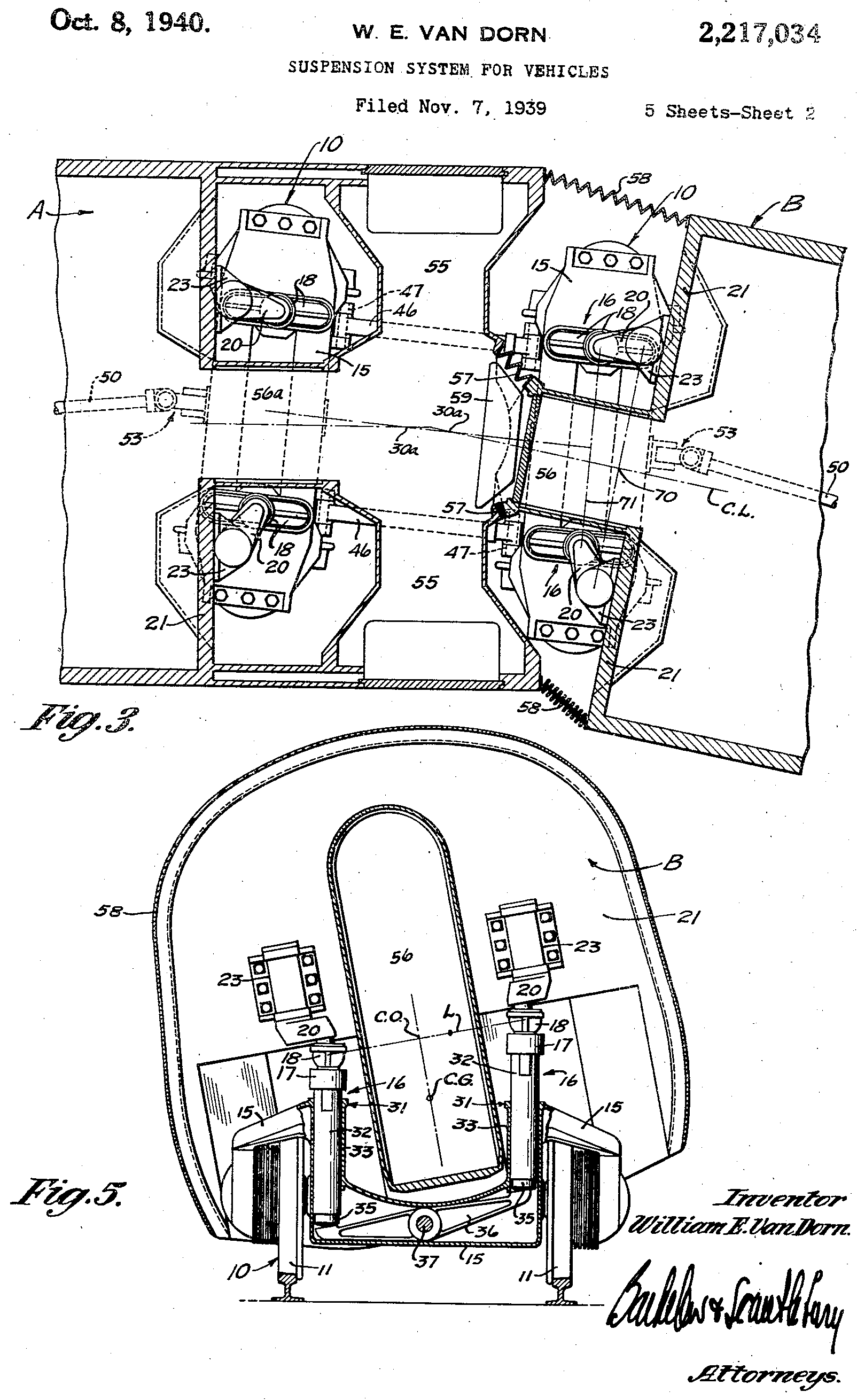
Illustration from U.S. patent 2,217,034 showing the coiled-spring suspension system.

The design of the pendulum car was strongly influenced by the 1930s aviation engineering. Its chief designer, William E. Van Dorn, was an aeronautical engineer from California Institute of Technology. Two other engineers on the project, Eliot F. Stoner and Herbert J. Wieden, had worked for Northrop Aircraft.

The primary innovation in the pendulum car was in the design of the truck. The body of the car rested on coiled springs, which were in turn attached to the truck. The springs connected to the car body at a point above the body's center of gravity, causing the body to effectively hang on the springs. As the car entered curves, it could "tilt" or swing, leaning to the inside of the curve. As the designers described in a paper presented at the annual conference of the American Society of Mechanical Engineers in 1940:

Lateral freedom of the suspension system is also desirable in order that the wheels may be free to follow the track irregularities without transmitting these motions to the car body.

— Paul K. Beemer, Fred C. Lindvall, Eliot F. Stoner, and William E. Van Dorn,

The prototype, completed in 1937, differed in many respects from the production model. It was constructed from plywood instead of steel, used stressed skin construction, and lacked "most of the usual auxiliary equipment of passenger cars." This contributed to the comparatively low weight of 65,000 lb (29,000 kg). The two-unit articulated coach measured 145 ft (44 m) long.

The production model was a standard 85 ft (26 m) long and weighed 109,000 lb (49,000 kg). The increased weight came from the stressed skin steel construction (instead of plywood), and the standard auxiliary equipment. Interior seating capacity ranged from 56–68. The distinctive oval or oblong windows were designed to reduce stress concentrations.

== History ==
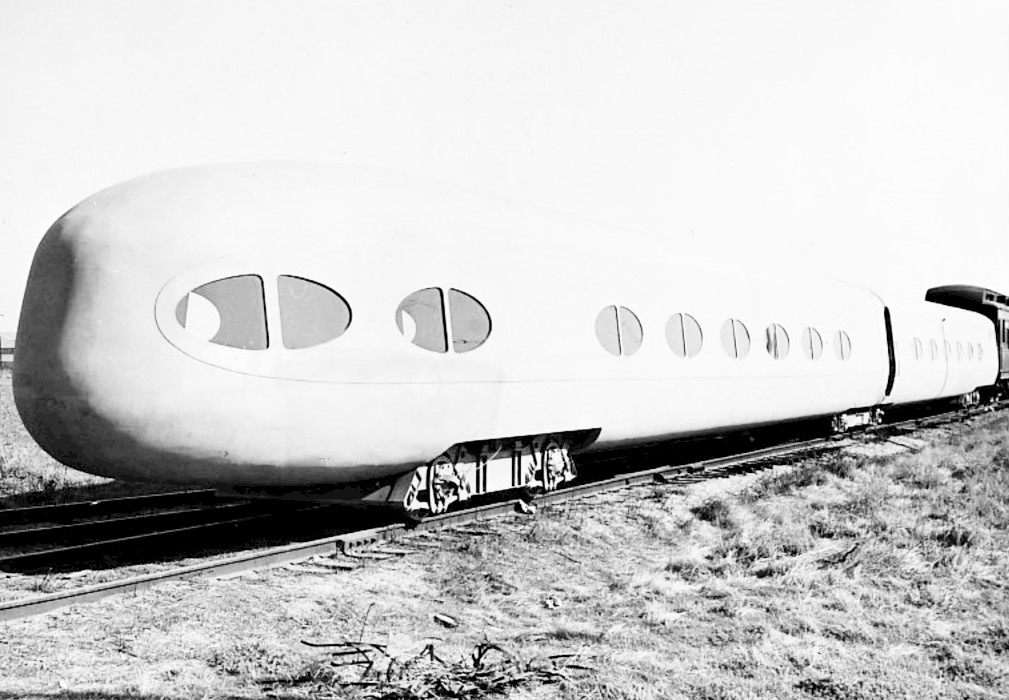
The articulated prototype in 1937.

The pendulum car was the brainchild of William E. Van Dorn. Financial backing came from Cortlandt T. Hill, grandson of railway magnate James J. Hill. They, along with F. C. Lindvall, an electrical engineering professor at Caltech, formed the Pacific Railway Equipment Company in 1935 to explore Van Dorn's concept. PERC acquired a factory near Los Angeles Municipal Airport (now Los Angeles International Airport) and constructed a two-car articulated prototype. The prototype was unveiled on December 22, 1937, and began tests on the Atchison, Topeka and Santa Fe Railway (Santa Fe).

The prototype spent several years running over the Santa Fe's lines in Southern California. The suspension system worked: the car rode far better than conventional designs. Life reported that it was "virtually vibrationless" at 50 mph (80 km/h), and "quite comfortable" at 97 mph (156 km/h).

Three railroads ordered production versions of the pendulum car: the Santa Fe, the Chicago, Burlington and Quincy Railroad (CB&Q), and the Great Northern Railway (GN). The Santa Fe's, No. 1100, was delivered in November 1941. It seated 56, with the additional space going to men's and women's bathrooms at opposite ends of the car. The CB&Q and GN cars arrived in early 1942. The CB&Q car, numbered 6000 and named Silver Pendulum, seated 60. GN numbered its car 999; it could seat 68.

The introduction of the cars coincided with the entrance of the United States into World War II. As the cars arrived they entered service with their respective railroads. The Santa Fe employed No. 1100 on the El Capitan. The three cars came together for a special run on April 13, 1942, between Chicago and Galesburg, Illinois, on April 13, 1942. The cars operated together with a lightweight and a heavyweight coach, and attained a maximum speed of 108.5 mph (174.6 km/h).

The railroads did not pursue the pendulum design after the war, for reasons which remain unclear. Most authors point to the expense of the design, with the interruption of the war as a complicating factor. The Pacific Railway Equipment Company, rebranded as Preco, found success building fans for refrigerator cars. The cars remained in service until their natural retirement. The Santa Fe assigned No. 1100 to the San Diegan. By 1958 CB&Q No. 6000, pulled by a motorcar, served on an unnamed connection of the Kansas City Zephyr. Neither the prototype nor any of the production cars were preserved.

== Other examples of pendulum suspension ==
Swincar, all-terrain one-sitter leisure electric vehicle.

== See also ==
- Amtrak Cascades
- UAC TurboTrain
