= Miller's pier =

Miller's pier Russian: пристань Миллера
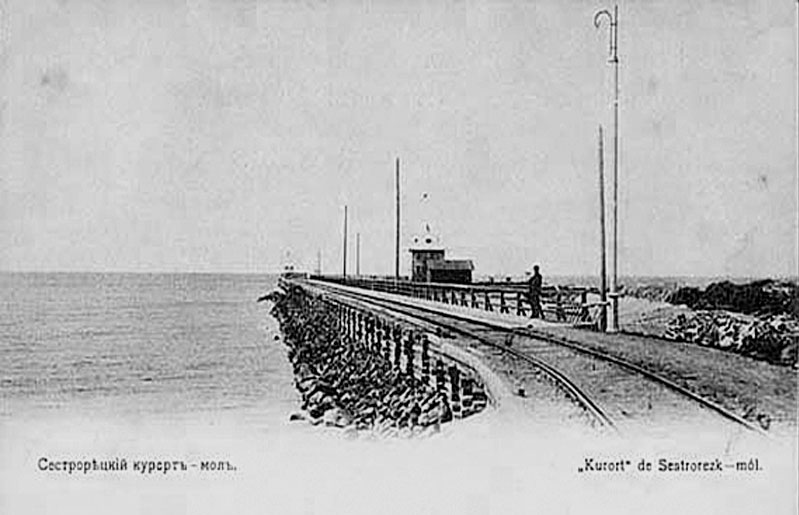
- View of Miller's pier in 1913

General information
- Coordinates: 60°7′5″N 29°56′28″E
- System: regional rail
- Line: Miller's line

Construction
- Structure type: at-grade

History
- Opened: 1875
Location

Miller's pier (Russian: при́стань Ми́ллера, Pristan Millera), is a former railway station at the quay in Sestroretsk Kurort, Russia. It was the last stop of the Miller's line. The 50-metre (160 ft) pier was constructed from boulders dumped into the Gulf of Finland. In time, the harbour acquired the name "Miller's Harbour".

On the bay coast, in 1875, a branch line was laid to the landing stage, and the first structures were erected on it in the same year. In 1899–1900 the Kurort's esplanade was opened, and the line was surrounded with two low enclosures. Operation was suspended in the late 1880s but the pier was destroyed only in the first decades of the 20th century. Presently only the minor fragments of the former pier can be vaguely discerned; also, Miller's line no longer exists.
