= Beloostrov =

Municipal settlement in Kurortny District, Saint Petersburg, Russia

Coordinates: 60°08′50″N 30°00′45″E

View of Beloostrov

Beloostrov (Russian: Белоо́стров; Finnish: Valkeasaari; lit. 'White Island'), from 1922 to World War II Krasnoostrov (Russian: Красноо́стров, lit. 'Red Island'), is a municipal settlement in Kurortny District of the federal city of St. Petersburg, Russia, located on the Sestra River, Karelian Isthmus. Population: 2,080 (2010 census); 1,690 (2002 census); 1,405 (1989 Soviet census). The settlement has a railway station Beloostrov.

== History ==
Beloostrov historically consists of two parts: Novy Beloostrov (Russian: Но́вый Белоо́стров, New White Island; Finnish: Uusi Valkeasaari) along the railway and Stary Beloostrov (Russian: Ста́рый Белоо́стров, Old White Island; Finnish: Vanha Valkeasaari) several kilometers to the north, mostly belonging to Vsevolozhsky District of Leningrad Oblast under the name Sadovodstva Island (Russian: остров Садоводства). Until the Winter War Beloostrov was the last railway station before the Russia–Finland border.

== Transportation ==
Beloostrov has been a key station of the Saint Petersburg-Vyborg railroad since 1870 (initially named Rayala (Finnish: Rajala)) at the junction of Saint Petersburg–Zelenogorsk and Saint Petersburg–Sestroretsk–Beloostrov sections, being the final destination of many suburban passenger electric trains from the Finland Railroad Station.
