= Sestroretsk =

Sestroretsk Сестрорецк
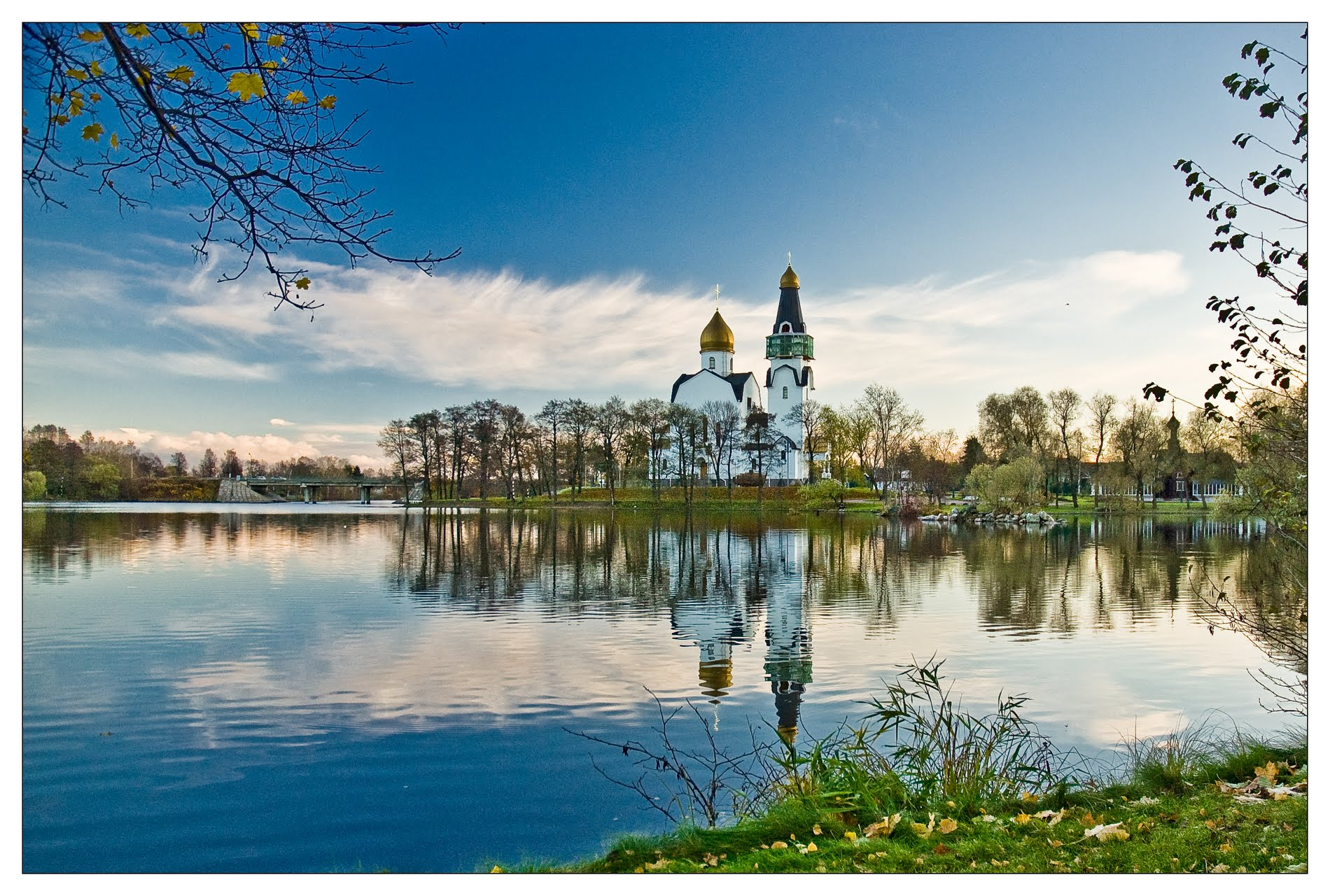
- View of the Church of Peter and Paul in Sestroretsk

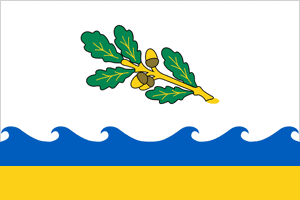
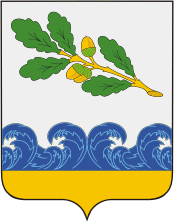
- Flag Coat of arms
- Interactive map of Sestroretsk
- Location of Sestroretsk Sestroretsk (Saint Petersburg)
- Coordinates: 60°06′N 29°58′E
- Country: Russia
- Federal subject: Saint Petersburg
- Founded: 1714

Population
  - Estimate (2023): 45,697 )
- Time zone: UTC+
- Postal codes: 197701, 197704, 197706
- OKTMO ID: 40362000

Sestroretsk in Saint Petersburg

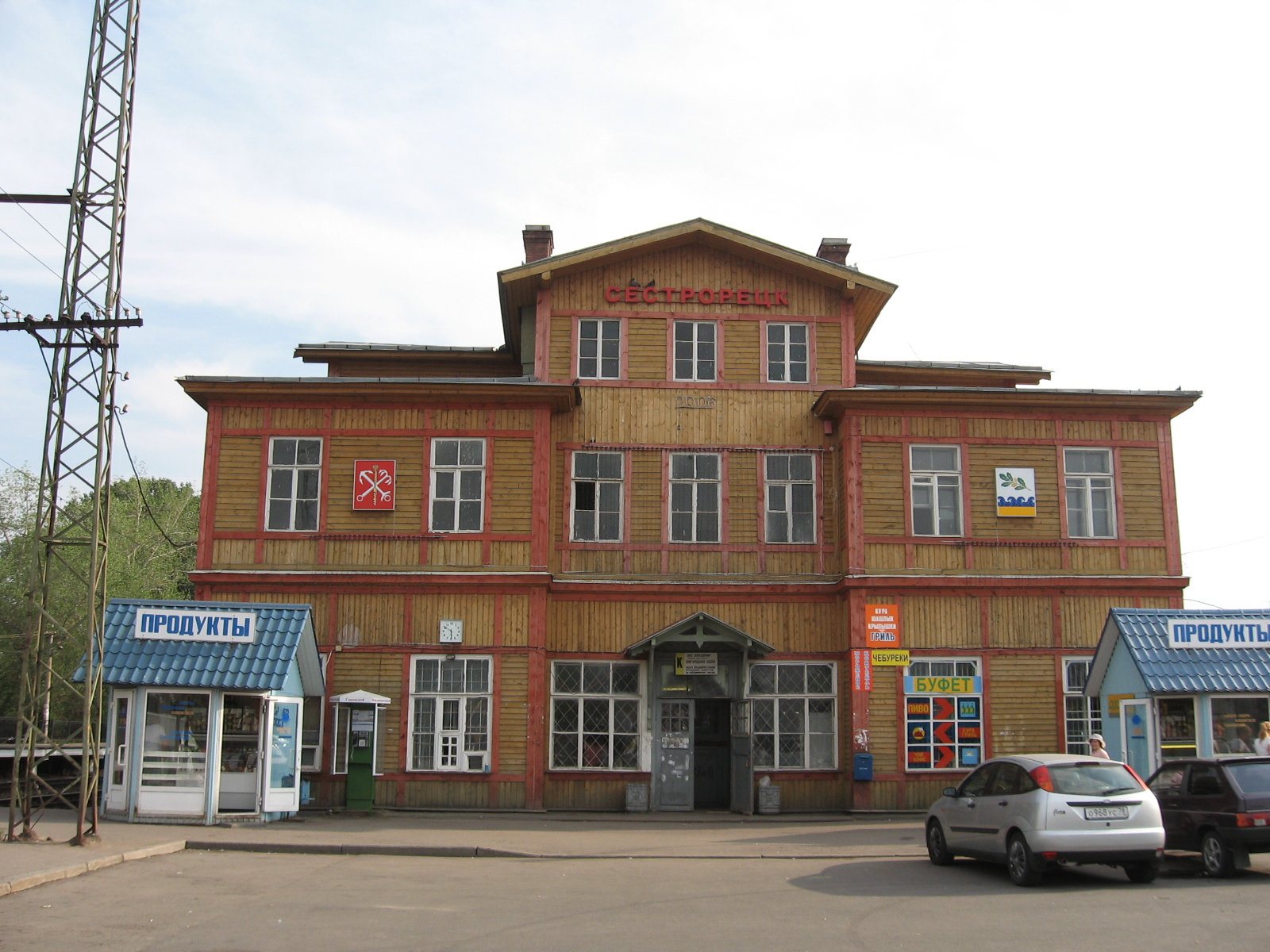
Sestroretsk railway station

Sestroretsk (Russian: Сестроре́цк; Finnish: Siestarjoki; Swedish: Systerbäck) is a municipal town in Kurortny District of the federal city of St. Petersburg, Russia, located on the shores of the Gulf of Finland, the Sestra River and the Sestroretskiy Lake 34 kilometers (21 mi) northwest of St. Petersburg. Population: 37,248 (2010 census); 40,287 (2002 census); 35,498 (1989 Soviet census); 30,500 (1975).

== Munitions factory ==
Sestroretsk was founded by Peter the Great in 1714 due to the construction of a munitions factory (today's Sestroretsk Toolmaking Factory).

== Healthcare ==
The town is known as a balneologic and climatic resort. A large hospital and rehabilitation center is situated within the boundaries of the town. It is the City hospital No. 40 of Saint Petersburg.

== Political history ==
In 1812, the town was incorporated into the Grand Duchy of Finland, along with Old Finland. In 1864, the town was transferred to Russia in exchange for a promise of compensation, supposedly in the form of access to the Arctic Ocean at Petsamo.

The representative body of local self-government - the municipal council - has been operating since 28 September 1997. In the elections on 14 September 2014, the 5th convocation was elected (10 deputies: 9 from United Russia; 1 self-nominated).

== Transportation ==
=== Railway stations ===
- Sestroretsk railway station
- Sestroretsk railway station (1871–1924)
- Kurort railway station for the sanatorium

=== Electric railway ===
In 1875, Fyodor Pirotsky experimented with electrically powered railway cars on the Miller's line railway. The electricity was transferred over a distance of approximately one kilometer. Although the experiment did not last, this was the first use of electricity to power any railway in the world. Another local railway line of historical interest is the Sestroretsk spur line.

== Vodoslivnyy canal ==
The Vodoslivnyy canal runs across the town from east to west and connects the Sestroretskiy Lake with the Gulf of Finland (Baltic Sea).

== Sister cities ==
The following cities are twinned with Sestroretsk:

- Äänekoski, Finland

== Gallery ==
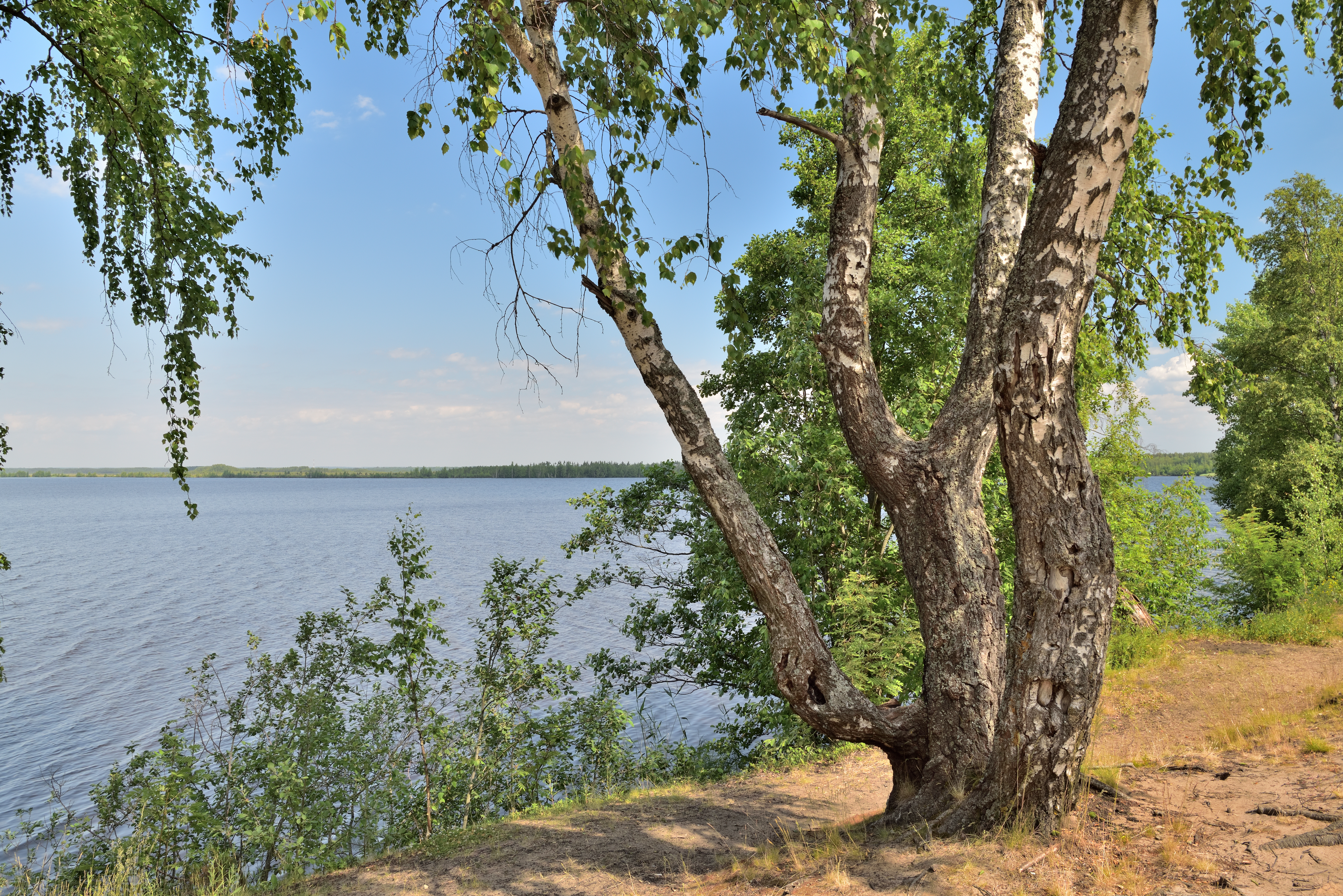
On the bank of the Sestroretsky flood in the Sestroretsky Swamp nature Reserve

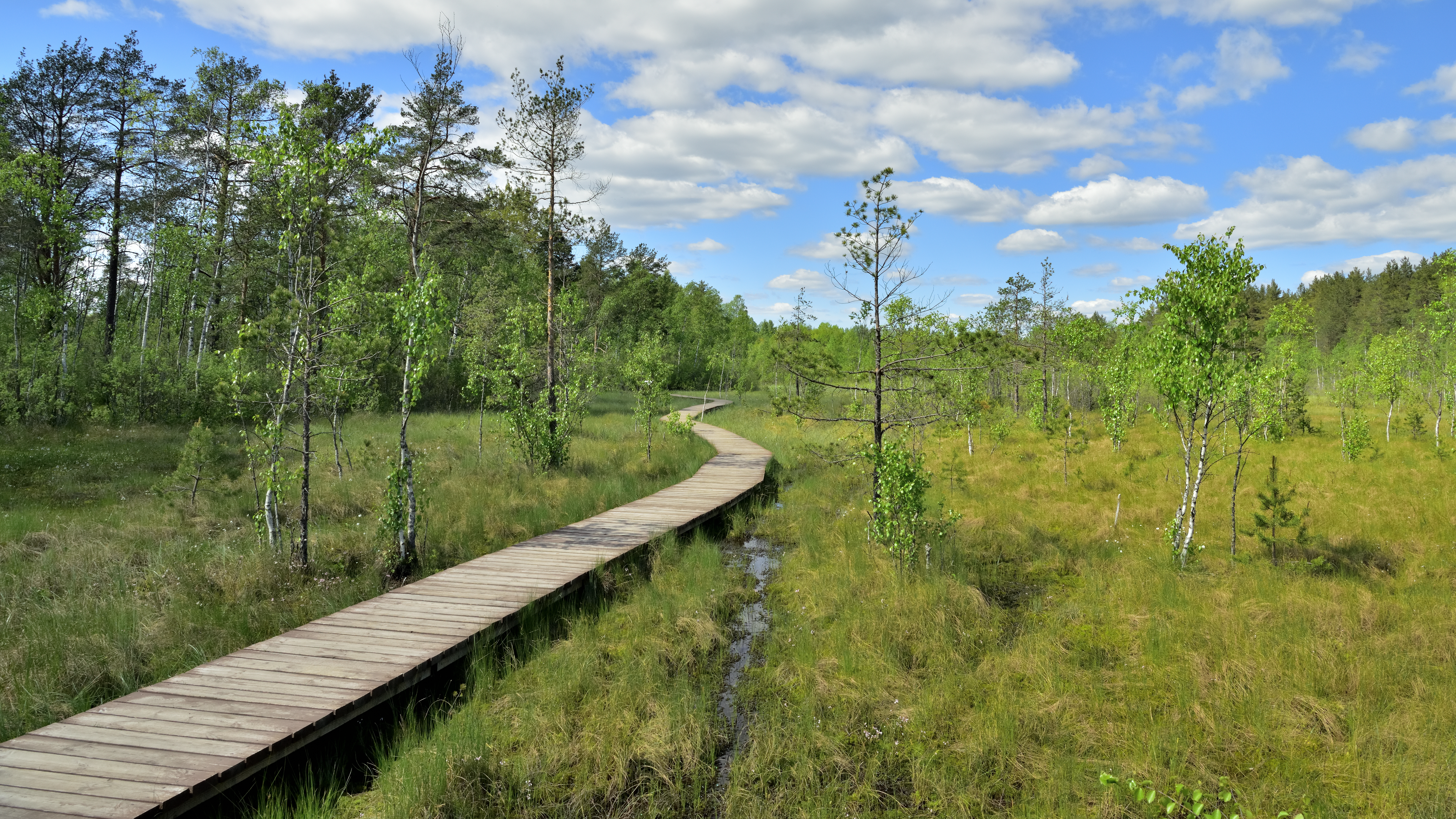
Eco-trail on the Sestroretsk swamp

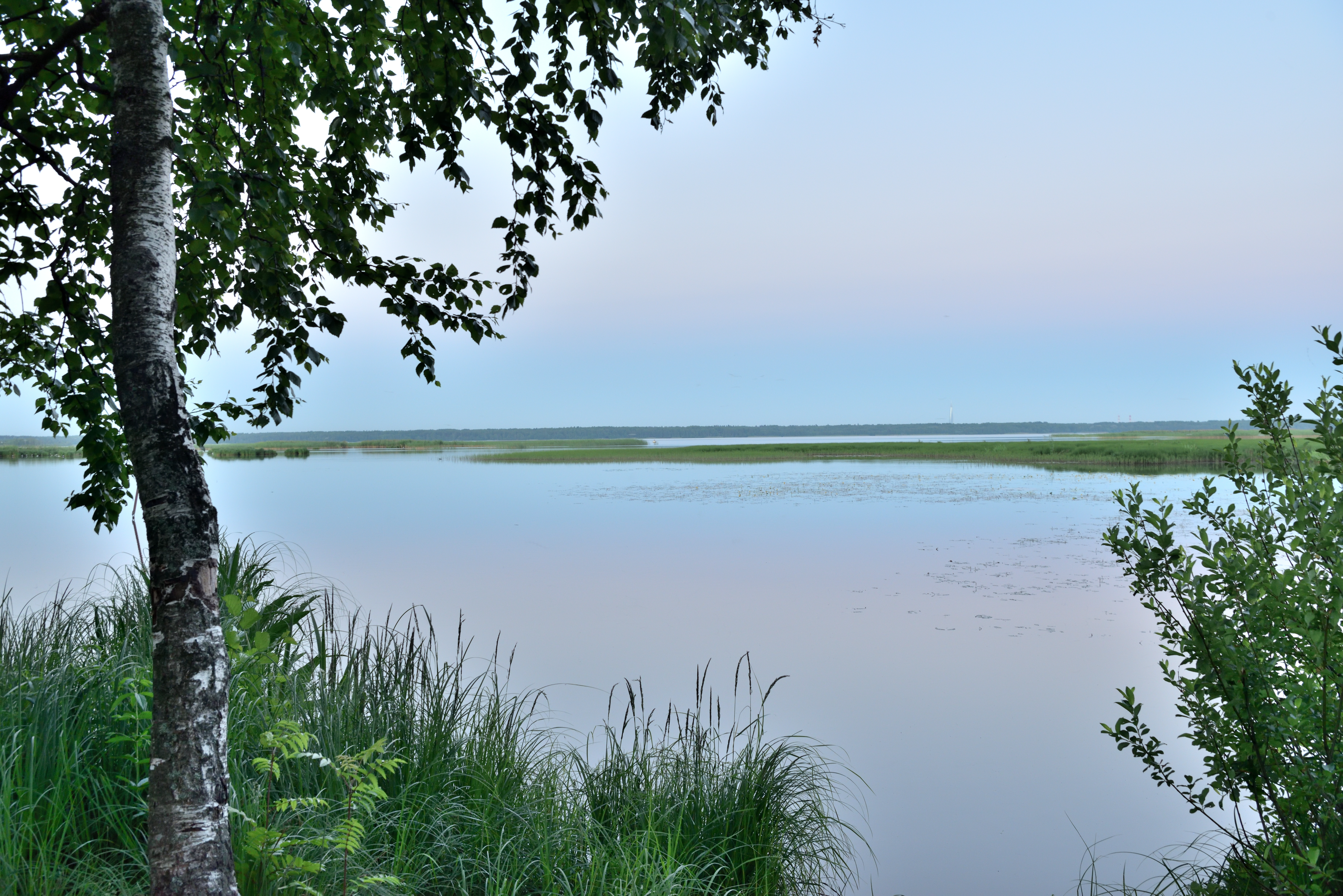
On the shore of the Sestroretsky flood on a White night
