= Santa Cruz de la Sierra =

Most populous city in Bolivia

- City and municipality
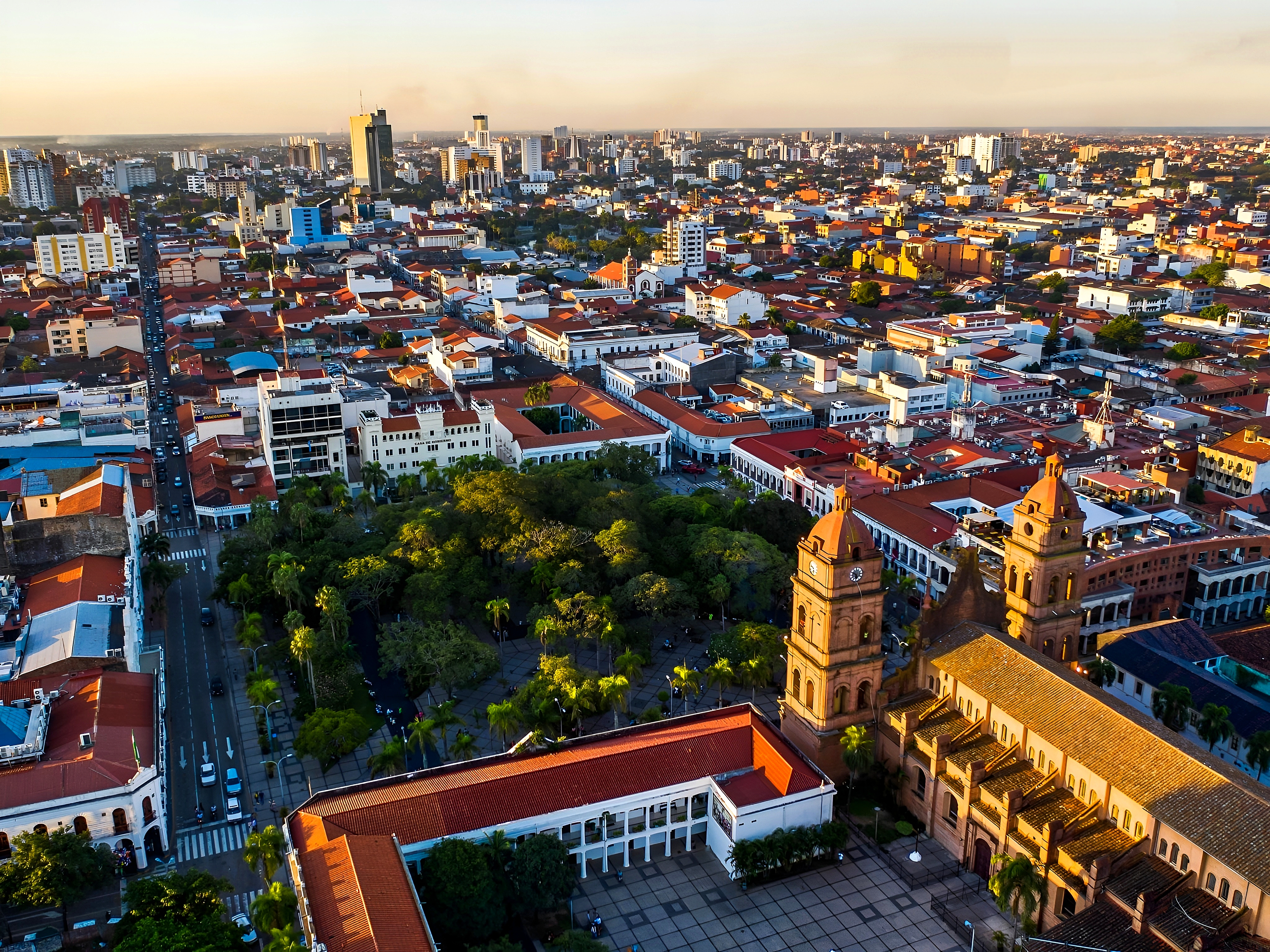
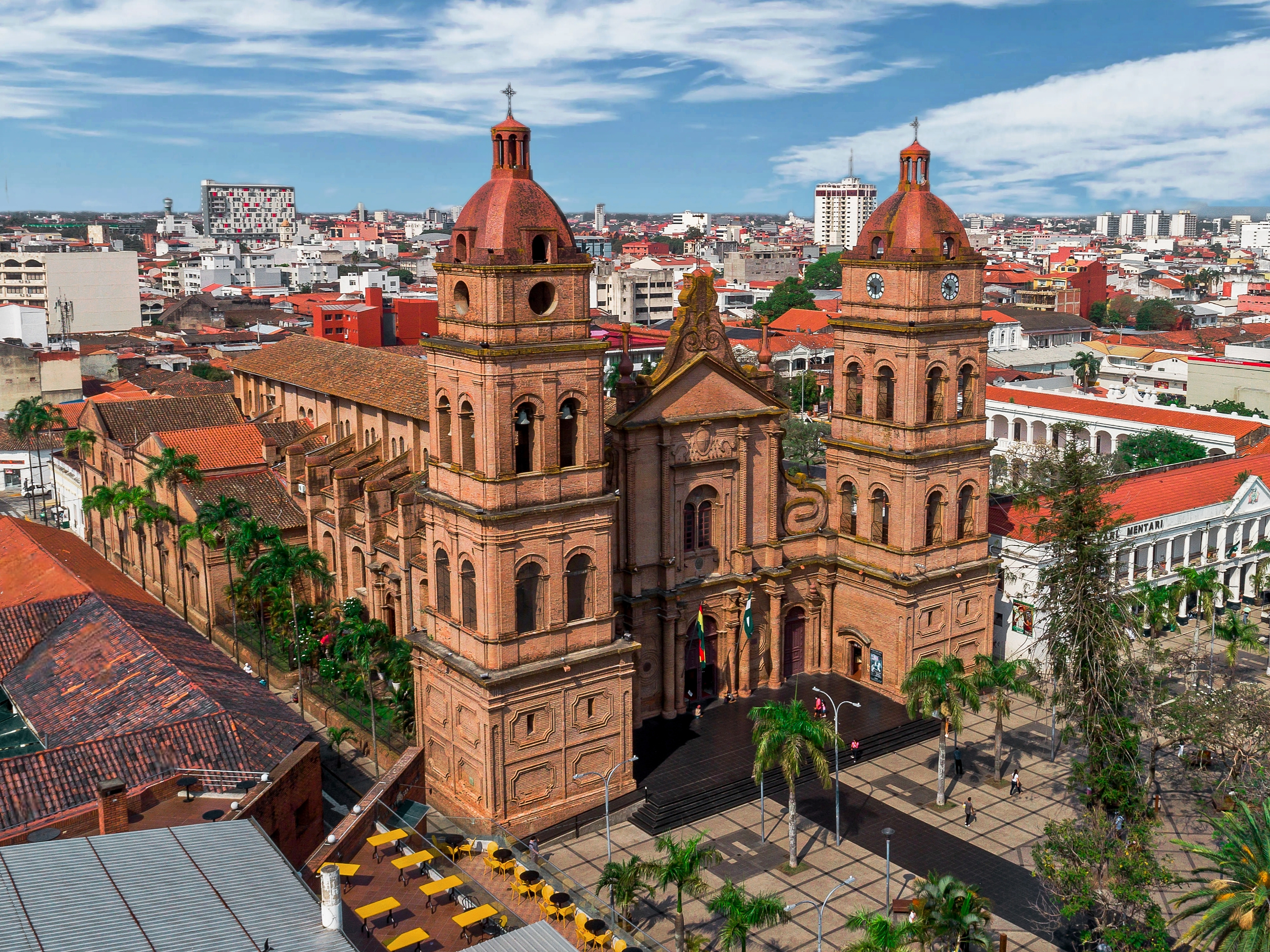
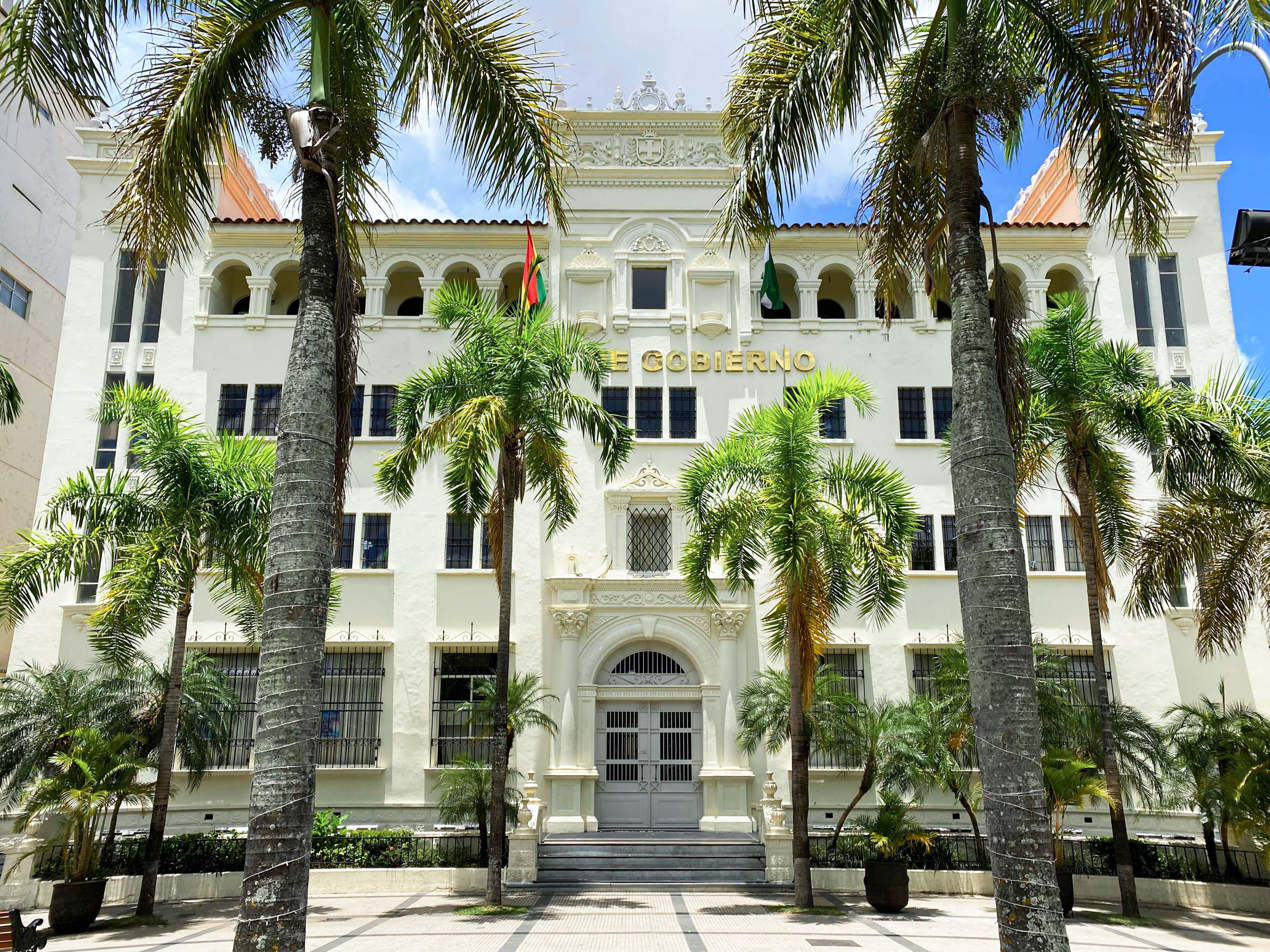
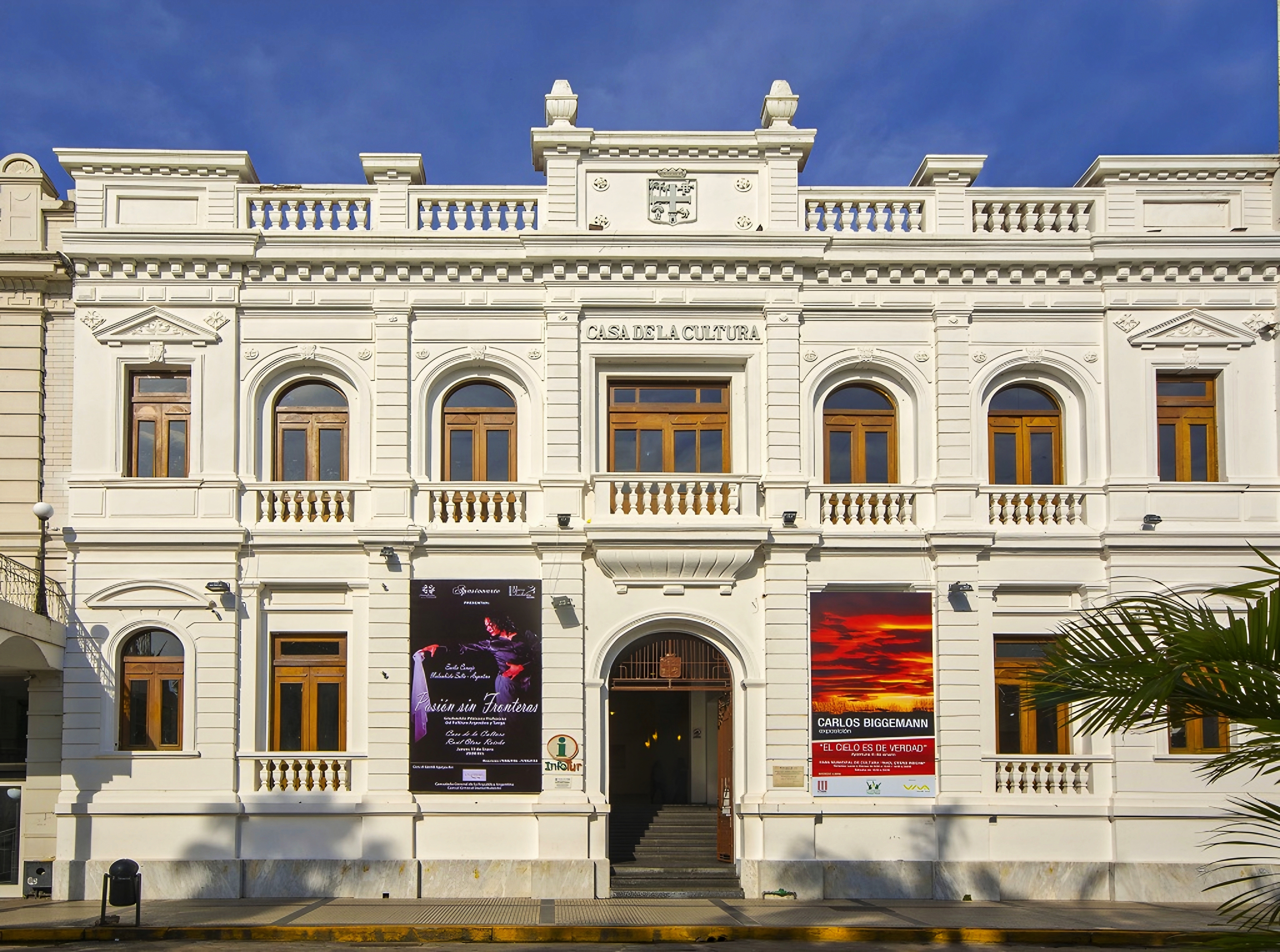
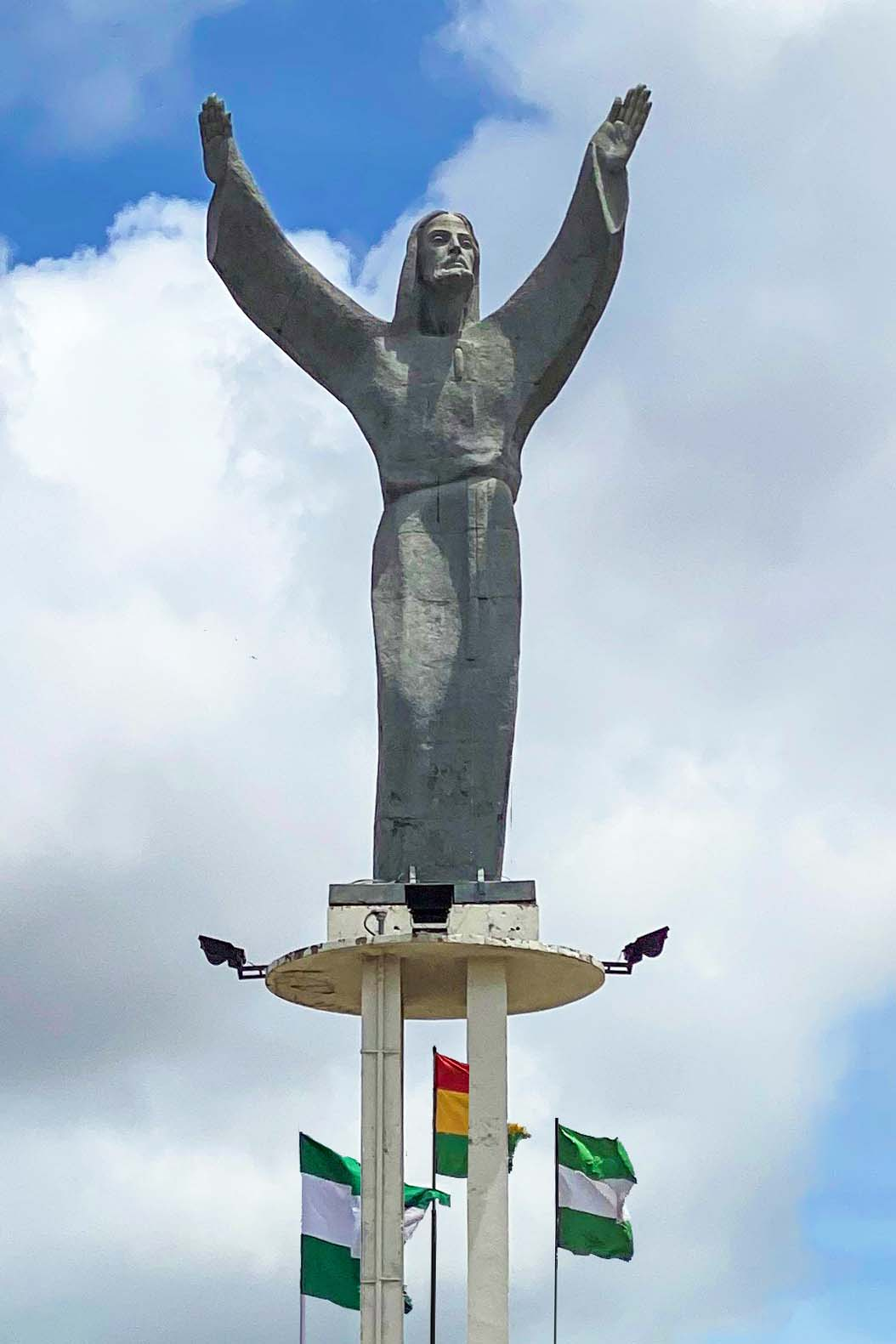
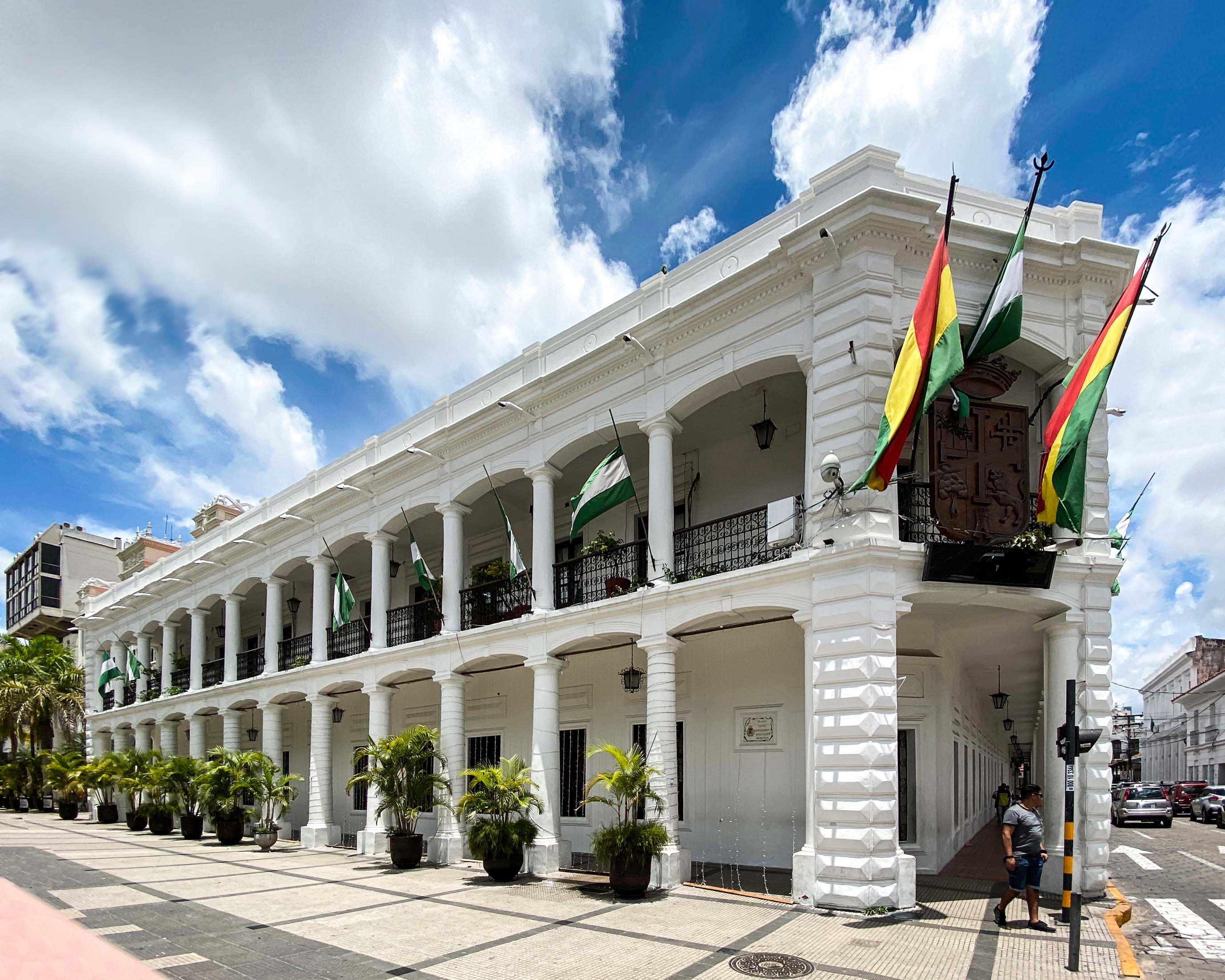
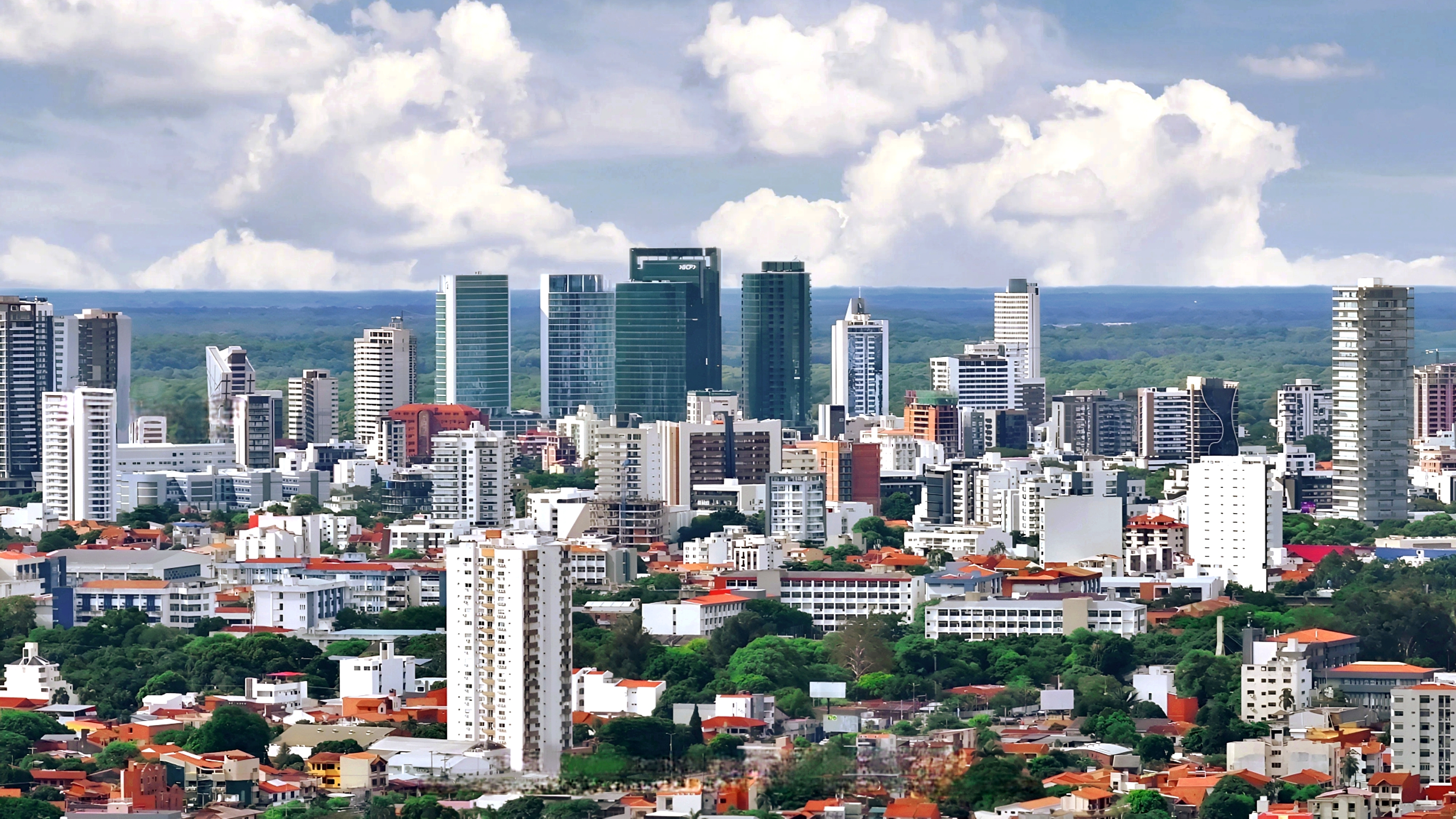
- View of the city from Plaza 24 de Septiembre Cathedral Basilica of St. Lawrence Government House House of Culture Cristo Redentor Municipal City Hall Equipetrol neighborhood

- Flag Coat of arms
- Nickname(s): La Capital del Oriente Boliviano (The Capital of the Eastern Bolivia); La Ciudad de los Anillos (The City of Rings)
- Motto: https://en.wikipedia.org/wiki/File:Bolivia_physical_map.svg
- Location within Bolivia Santa Cruz de la Sierra (South America) Santa Cruz de la Sierra (Earth)
- Coordinates: 17°48′S 63°11′W
- Country: Bolivia
- Department: Santa Cruz
- Province: Andrés Ibáñez
- Founded: February 26, 1561

Government
  - Type: Municipal Autonomous Government
  - Mayor: Mamen Saavedra

Area
  - City and municipality: 1,345 km^{2} (519 sq mi)
- Elevation: 400 m (1,300 ft)

Population (2024)
  - City and municipality: 1,610,982
  - Rank: 1st in Bolivia
  - Density: 1,198/km^{2} (3,102/sq mi)
  - Urban: 1,786,386
  - Metro: 1,891,000

GDP (PPP, constant 2015 values)
  - Year: 2023
  - Total: $23.3 billion
  - Per capita: $12,800
- Time zone: UTC−4 (BOT)
- Area code: (+591) 3
- HDI (2016): 0.827 Very High
- Website: www.gmsantacruz.gob.bo

Santa Cruz de la Sierra (Spanish: [ˈsanta ˈkɾus ðe la ˈsjera]; lit. 'Holy Cross of the Mountain Range'), commonly known as Santa Cruz, is the largest city in Bolivia and the capital of the Santa Cruz department.

Situated on the Pirai River in the eastern Tropical Lowlands of Bolivia, the Santa Cruz de la Sierra Metropolitan Region is the most populous urban agglomeration in Bolivia with an estimated population of 2.4 million in 2020. It is formed out of a conurbation of seven Santa Cruz municipalities: Santa Cruz de la Sierra, La Guardia, Warnes, Cotoca, El Torno, Porongo, and Montero.

The city was first founded in 1561 by Spanish explorer Ñuflo de Chavez about 200 km (124 mi) east of its current location, and was moved several times until it was finally established on the Pirai River in the late 16th century. For much of its history, Santa Cruz was mostly a small outpost town, and even after Bolivia gained its independence in 1825 there was little attention from the authorities or the population in general to settle the region. It was not until after the middle of the 20th century with profound agrarian and land reforms that the city began to grow at a very fast pace. Due to its low elevation at the foothills of the Andes and being situated in the Amazon basin, the city has a tropical climate unlike the other main metro area of La Paz that is thousands of meters higher in terms of elevation.

Santa Cruz is Bolivia's most populous city, produces nearly 35% of Bolivia's gross domestic product, and receives over 40% of all foreign direct investment in the country. The city is the most important business center in Bolivia and the country's principal destination for national and international migrants.

== History ==
=== Pre-Columbian era ===
Before the arrival of European explorers the indigenous local tribes lead a prehistoric existence that provides us with limited non-written evidence of their culture. However, recent data suggests that the current location of the city of Santa Cruz was inhabited by an Arawak tribe that later came to be known by the Spanish as Chané. Remains of ceramics and weapons have been found in the area, leading researchers to believe they had established settlements in the area. Among the few known facts about these tribes, according to accounts of the first Spanish explorers, are that they had a formal leader, a cacique, called Grigotá for several years but his reign came to an end after one of the several Guarani (Chiriguano) incursions in the area.

=== Early European incursions and founding of the city ===
The adelantado grants of Charles V before the establishment of the Viceroyalty of Peru.

The first Europeans to set foot in the area were Spanish conquistadores from the recently created Governorate of New Andalusia that encompassed the territories of present-day Argentina, Uruguay, Paraguay, and Chile.

In 1549, Captain General Domingo Martinez de Irala became the first Spaniard to explore the region, but it was not until 1558 that Ñuflo de Chavez, who had arrived in Asunción in 1541 with Álvar Núñez Cabeza de Vaca, led a new expedition with the objective of settling the region. After discovering that a new expedition from Asunción was already underway, he quickly traveled to Lima and successfully persuaded the Viceroy to create a new province and grant him the title of governor on February 15, 1560. Upon returning from Lima, Chavez founded the city of Santa Cruz de la Sierra (Holy Cross of the Mountain Range) on February 26, 1561, 220 km (137 mi) east of its present-day location, to function as the capital of the newly formed province of Moxos and Chaves. The settlement was named after Chaves's home town in Extremadura, where he grew up before venturing to America.

Shortly after the founding, attacks from local tribes became commonplace and Ñuflo de Chaves was killed in 1568 by Itatine natives. After Chaves's death, the conflicts with the local population as well as power struggles in the settlement forced the authorities in Peru to order the new governor, Lorenzo Suarez de Figueroa to relocate the city to the west. Many of the inhabitants, however, chose to stay behind and continued living in the original location. On September 13, 1590, the city was officially moved to the banks of the Guapay Empero river and renamed San Lorenzo de la Frontera. Nevertheless, the conditions proved to be even more severe at the new location forcing the settlers to relocate once again on May 21, 1595. Although this was the final relocation of the city, the name San Lorenzo continued to be used until the early 17th century, when the settlers who remained behind in Santa Cruz de la Sierra were convinced by the colonial authorities to move to San Lorenzo. After they moved the city was finally consolidated in 1622 and took its original name of Santa Cruz de la Sierra given by Ñuflo de Chaves over 60 years before. Remnants of the original settlement can be visited in Santa Cruz la Vieja ("Old Santa Cruz"), an archaeological site south of San José de Chiquitos.

=== Colonial Santa Cruz and revolutionary war ===
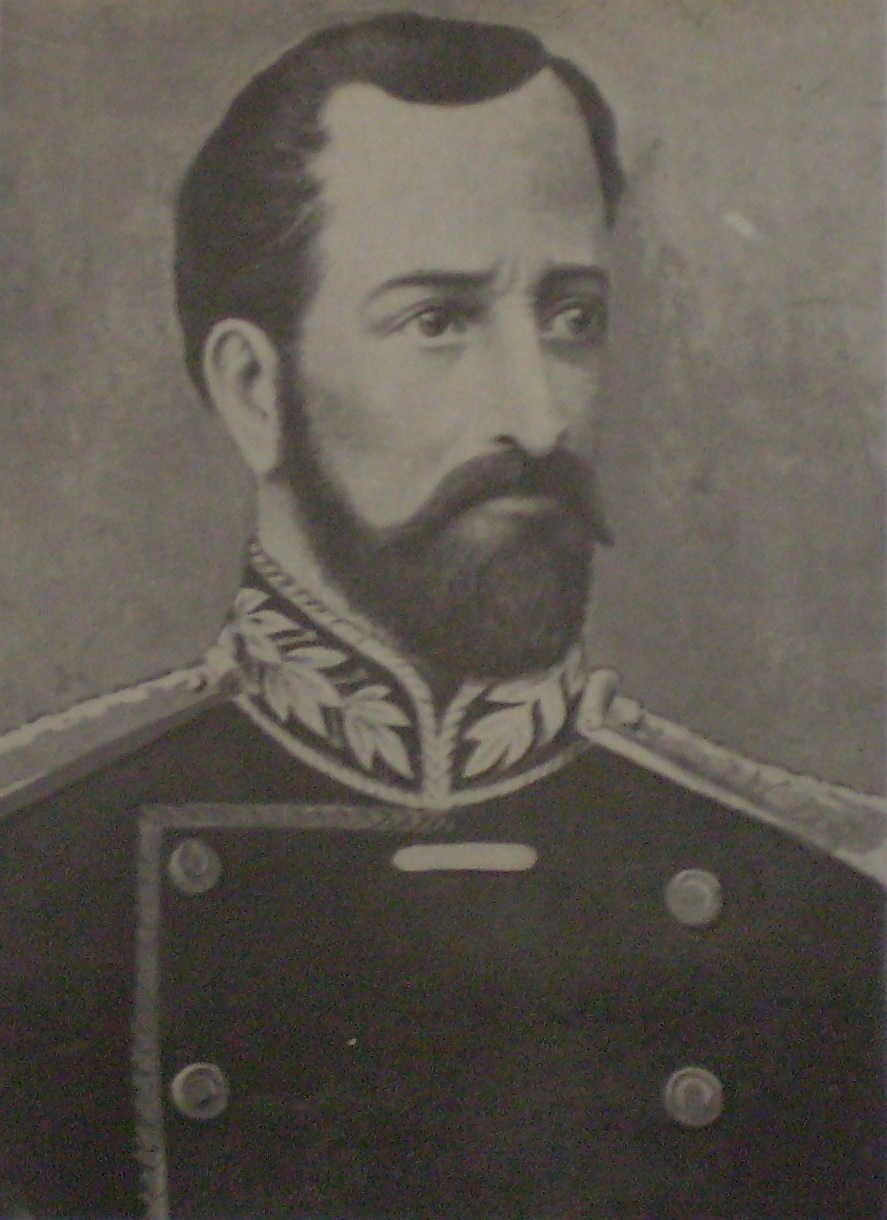
Ignacio Warnes, the first governor of Santa Cruz

Over the next 200 years, several tribes were either incorporated under Spanish control or defeated by force. The city also became an important staging point for Jesuit missions to Chiquitos and Moxos, leading to the conversion of thousands of Guaranies, Moxeños, Chiquitanos, Guarayos and Chiriguanos that eventually became part of the racially mixed population of the modern Santa Cruz, Beni, Pando and Tarija departments of Bolivia. Another important role the small town played in the region for the Spanish Empire was to contain the incursions of Portuguese Bandeirantes, many of which were repelled by the use of force over the years. The efforts for consolidating the borders of the Empire were not overlooked by the authorities in Lima, who granted the province a great degree of autonomy. The province was ruled by a Captain General based in Santa Cruz, and, in turn, the city government was administered by two mayors and a council of four people. Citizens of Santa Cruz were exempt from all imperial taxes and the mita system used in the rest of the Viceroyalty of Peru was not practiced. However, in spite of its strategic importance, the city did not grow much in colonial times. Most of the economic activity was centered in the mining centers of the west and the main source of income of the city was agriculture.

Animosity towards imperial authorities began at the turn of the 18th century when the new system of intendencias reached the new world. The seat of government was taken away from the city and moved to Cochabamba, and many of the powers delegated by the viceroyalty were now in the hands of appointees of the crown. Like in many parts of Spanish America at the time, angered by the reforms the criollos saw as a threat to their way of life, and taking advantage of the Peninsular War, the local population, led by Antonio Vicente Seoane, revolted on September 24, 1810, overthrowing the governor delegate. A junta of local commanders took control of the government in his place. The revolutionaries, as it was the case with most of the revolts in Spanish America, remained loyal to the King of Spain, while repudiating the colonial authorities until after the end of the Peninsular War.

By 1813 the city was once again under imperial control. At this time, by order of General Manuel Belgrano, the revolutionary armies of Argentina sent a small force led by Ignacio Warnes to "liberate" Santa Cruz. After his successful campaign, he assumed control of the government of the city. In a little over a year Warnes was able to gather tremendous support from the population, enlisting criollos, mestizos and natives to the revolutionary army, and allying with the revolutionary leader of Vallegrande, Alvarez de Arenales, to defeat a strong imperial force in the Battle of Florida. This victory proved to be a serious blow to Spanish forces in the region. Nevertheless, two years after the victory of Florida, imperial forces launched a new offensive in the province led by Francisco Javier Aguilera. This campaign ended with the defeat and death of Ignacio Warnes and his forces in the Battle of Pari. Triumphant, Aguilera marched into the city with orders to quell the insurrection and reinstate the Spanish governor. This proved to be a very difficult task, with several revolutionary leaders, such as Jose Manuel "Cañoto" Baca and Jose Manuel Mercado, rising up in the coming years from the city itself and elsewhere in the province. These new leaders fought colonial authorities for seven years until they finally deposed the last Spanish governor, Manuel Fernando Aramburu, in February 1825 after news of the defeat of the imperial armies in the west had reached the city.

== Geography ==
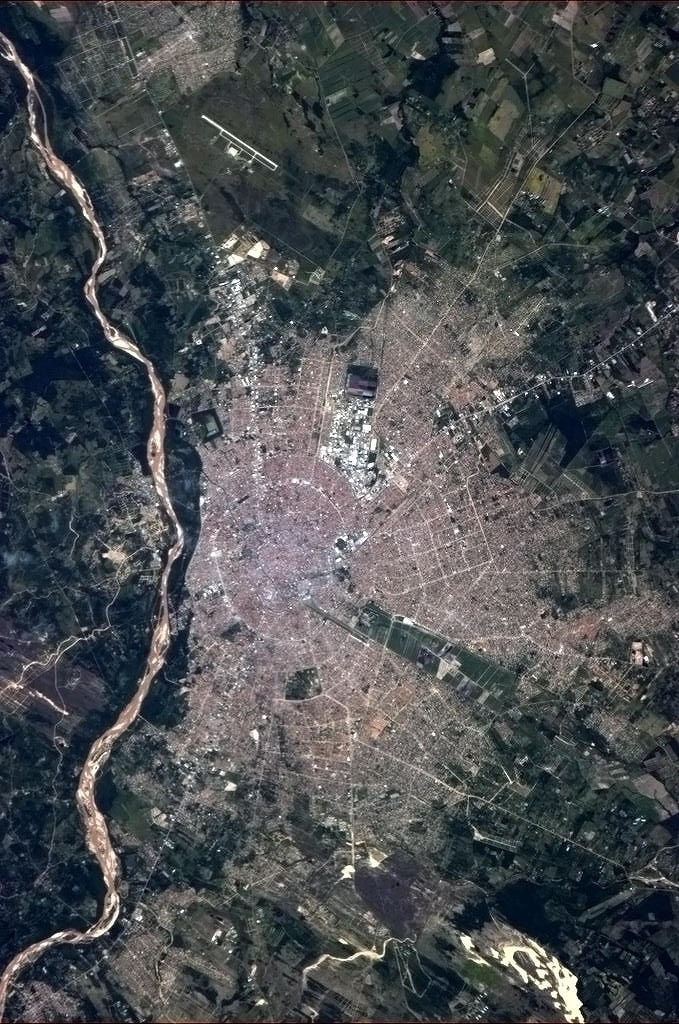
Santa Cruz, seen from the International Space Station

The city is located in the eastern part of Bolivia (17°45', South, 63°14', West) at around 400 m above sea level. It is part of the province of Andrés Ibáñez and the capital of the department of Santa Cruz. The city of Santa Cruz is located not far from the easternmost extent of the Andes Mountains and they are visible from some parts of the city.

=== Climate ===
The city has a tropical monsoon climate (Köppen: Am), with an average annual temperature around 25 °C (77 °F) and all months above 18 °C or 64.4 °F . Santa Cruz is an example of the influence of continentality (reflecting the thermal amplitude) in the tropics, without the four well-defined seasons of the year but greater deviations of temperature than other places in the coast or island. Although the weather is generally very warm all year round, cold winds called "surazos" can blow in occasionally (particularly in the winter) from the Argentine pampas making the temperature drop considerably. The months of greatest rainfall are December and January. The average annual rainfall is 1,321 mm (52 in). Santa Cruz sits at the edge of the Codo de Arica, where winds are particularly strong in Bolivia. Annual variations in temperature and precipitation are common, as is the case across much of the region. Annual precipitation in recent history has varied between 900 and 2,300 millimetres (35 and 91 in).

Climate data for Santa Cruz de la Sierra (El Trompillo Airport) 1991–2020 normals
Month	Jan	Feb	Mar	Apr	May	Jun	Jul	Aug	Sep	Oct	Nov	Dec	Year
Record high °C (°F)	38.8 (101.8)	39.5 (103.1)	39.5 (103.1)	37.0 (98.6)	36.0 (96.8)	34.5 (94.1)	35.5 (95.9)	40.0 (104.0)	40.5 (104.9)	41.0 (105.8)	41.1 (106.0)	40.0 (104.0)	41.1 (106.0)
Mean daily maximum °C (°F)	31.1 (88.0)	30.6 (87.1)	30.6 (87.1)	29.4 (84.9)	26.7 (80.1)	25.6 (78.1)	26.1 (79.0)	28.9 (84.0)	31.1 (88.0)	31.7 (89.1)	31.7 (89.1)	31.1 (88.0)	29.6 (85.2)
Daily mean °C (°F)	26.8 (80.2)	26.3 (79.3)	26.2 (79.2)	24.7 (76.5)	22.4 (72.3)	20.8 (69.4)	21.1 (70.0)	23.3 (73.9)	25.6 (78.1)	26.8 (80.2)	27.1 (80.8)	26.9 (80.4)	24.8 (76.7)
Mean daily minimum °C (°F)	22.8 (73.0)	22.2 (72.0)	21.1 (70.0)	20.6 (69.1)	18.3 (64.9)	16.7 (62.1)	16.1 (61.0)	17.8 (64.0)	20.0 (68.0)	21.7 (71.1)	22.2 (72.0)	22.2 (72.0)	20.1 (68.3)
Record low °C (°F)	9.3 (48.7)	12.0 (53.6)	11.4 (52.5)	8.5 (47.3)	3.7 (38.7)	3.5 (38.3)	1.3 (34.3)	1.9 (35.4)	4.5 (40.1)	7.0 (44.6)	9.4 (48.9)	13.3 (55.9)	1.3 (34.3)
Average precipitation mm (inches)	135.6 (5.34)	120.9 (4.76)	107.2 (4.22)	115.4 (4.54)	85.9 (3.38)	84.1 (3.31)	53.1 (2.09)	54.6 (2.15)	52.3 (2.06)	97.0 (3.82)	104.1 (4.10)	141.0 (5.55)	1,151.2 (45.32)
Average precipitation days	12	9	10	8	7	7	5	3	5	6	7	12	91
Average relative humidity (%)	79	78	78	77	77	75	65	64	65	65	74	78	73
Mean monthly sunshine hours	213.9	198.8	213.9	240.0	213.9	210.0	213.9	279.0	240.0	251.1	240.0	213.9	2,728.4
Source 1: Servicio Nacional de Meteorología e Hidrología de Bolivia
Source 2: Weather & Climate (Copernicus C3S Humidity / Sunshine)

== Demographics ==
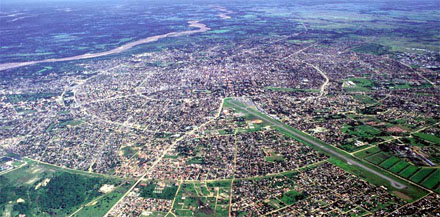
Aerial view of Santa Cruz de la Sierra

The city of Santa Cruz is, besides being the largest city in Bolivia, the one with the greatest mestizo and Creole identity, and with a smaller indigenous population. The first settlers of Santa Cruz were mainly the Native Chane people of East Bolivia followed by the Spaniards that accompanied Ñuflo de Chávez, as well as Guarani natives from Paraguay, and other native American groups that previously lived there working for the Spanish crown. Eventually, the Spanish settlers and native people of Bolivia began to mix which has resulted in the majority of the city population being mestizo. When the Spanish settlers arrived to Bolivia, Catholicism, as well as the Spanish language, were implemented onto the natives which is now why the city is predominantly Catholic and speaks Spanish. Nevertheless, native religions and languages are still used by a minority of the population.

There was a distinction between the ethno-demographic profile of the Santa Cruz de la Sierra region, marked by the mestizo, Spanish and eastern indigenous presence, in relation to the population of the Bolivian Altiplano, western part of the country mostly Andean indigenous with a smaller mestizo and Spanish presence. However, in the last 60 years, large migrations from the western regions of Bolivia to Santa Cruz have transformed the demographics of the city and department redefining its social and ethnic spectrum. In recent years, external migration has also become noticeable in Santa Cruz. Immigrants in Bolivia, especially in Santa Cruz have mainly originated from Argentina, Brazil, Spain, Peru, United States and Mexico.

== Economy ==
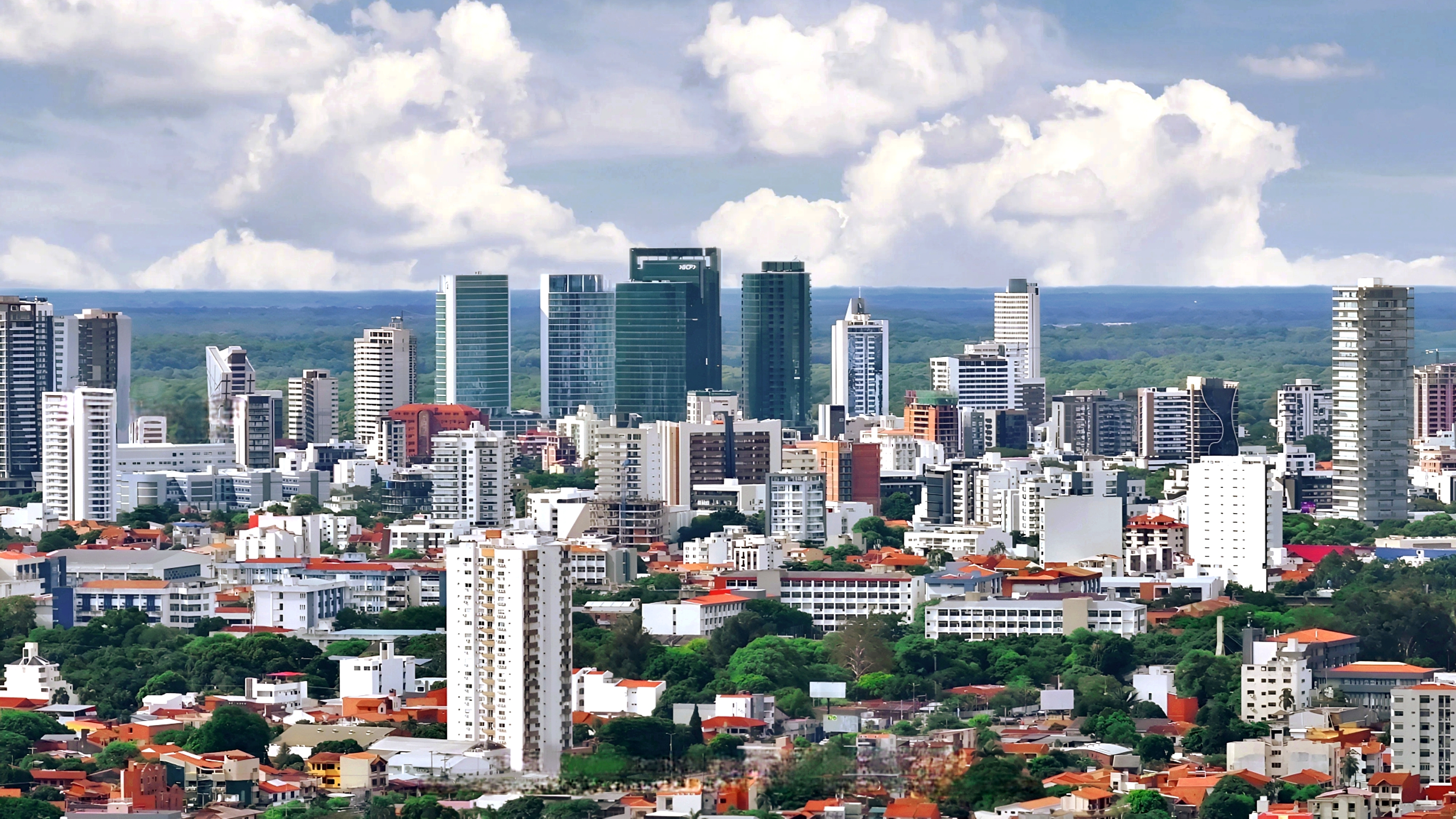
Equipetrol Neighborhood

Santa Cruz de la Sierra is Bolivia's main economic, commercial, and industrial center. Its economy is divided into several specialized sectors, including entertainment, gastronomy, textiles, banking, agroindustry, tourism, automotive, and other industries.

Following its development and economic exposure, the city has the highest Human Development Index (HDI) in the country, with a value of 0.827 at the city level and 0.758 at the department level.

Its population growth is among the fastest in the Americas. It has a nominal GDP of $9.175 billion, a nominal GDP per capita of just over $4,200, and a PPP GDP per capita of $12,800.

It is also considered the franchise capital of Bolivia, as it has the largest number of national and international franchises in the country, spanning various categories, such as Hard Rock Cafe, Starbucks, Kentucky Fried Chicken, Pizza Hut, Juan Valdez, Cinemark, Sbarro, Carl's Jr, Subway, Burger King, T.G.I. Friday's, Cinnabon, Papa John's, Johnny Rockets, Hooters, Náutica, Levi's, Nike, ALDO, etc.

=== Economic growth and urban expansion ===
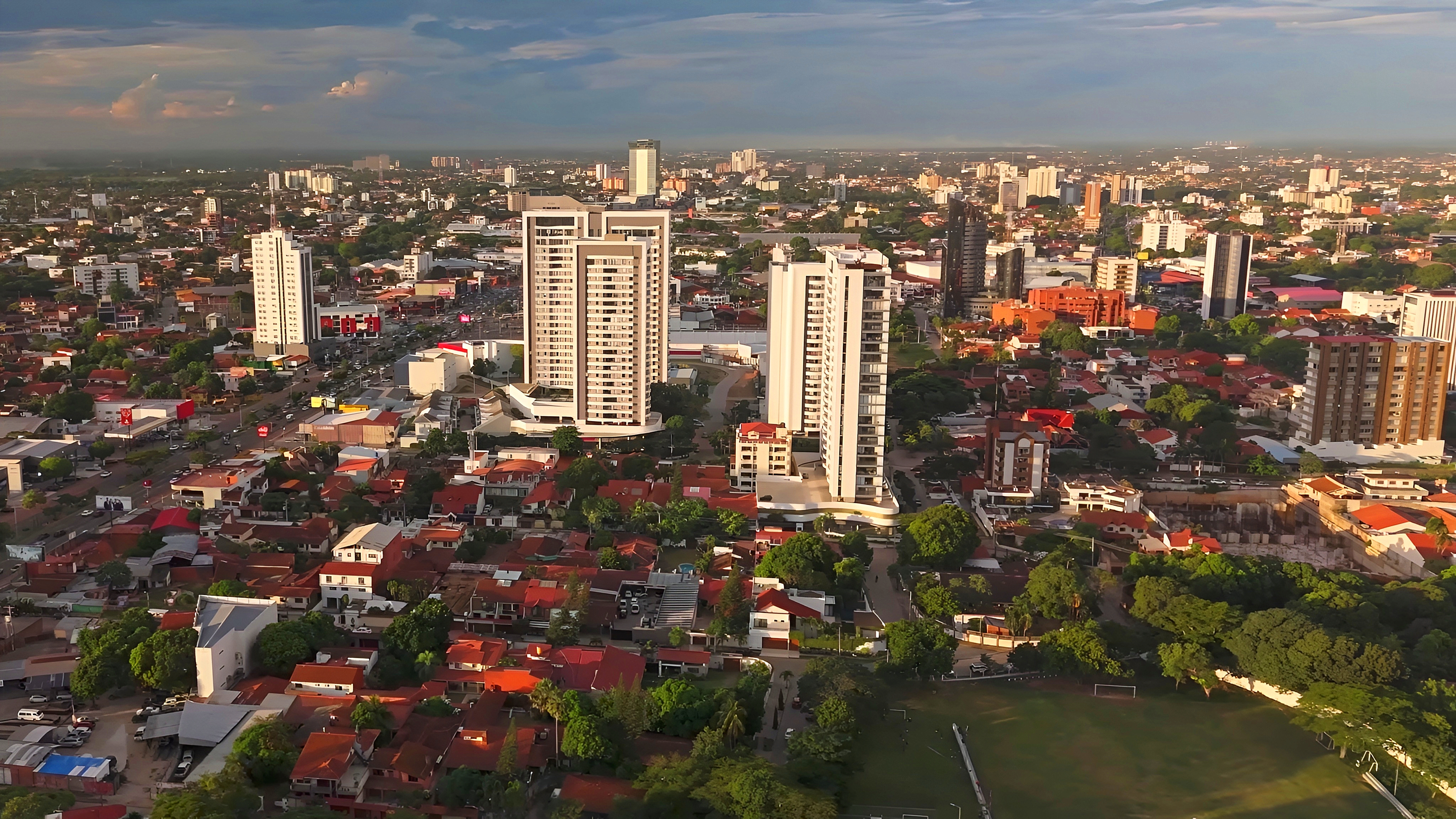
Los Cusis

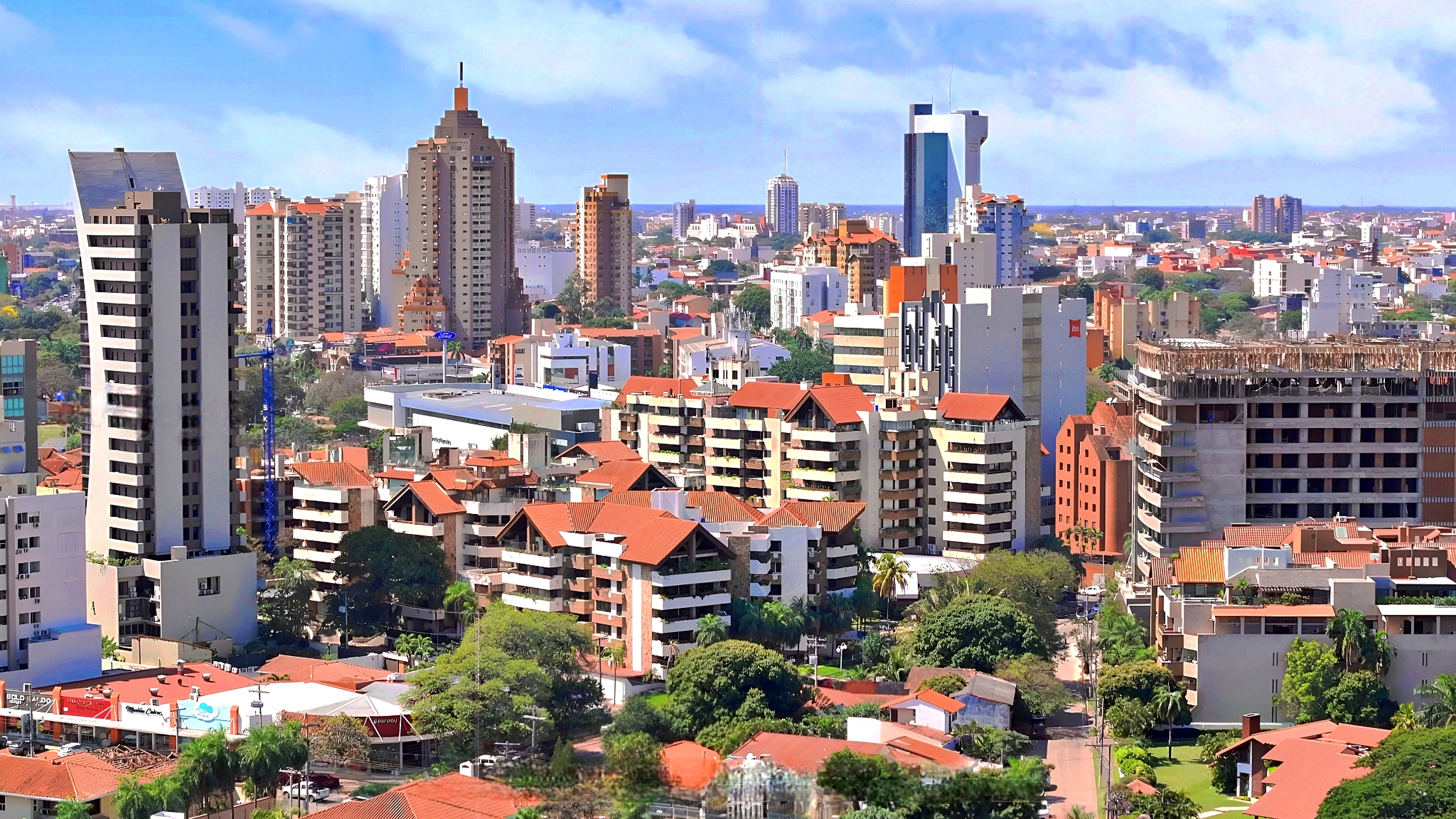
Downtown

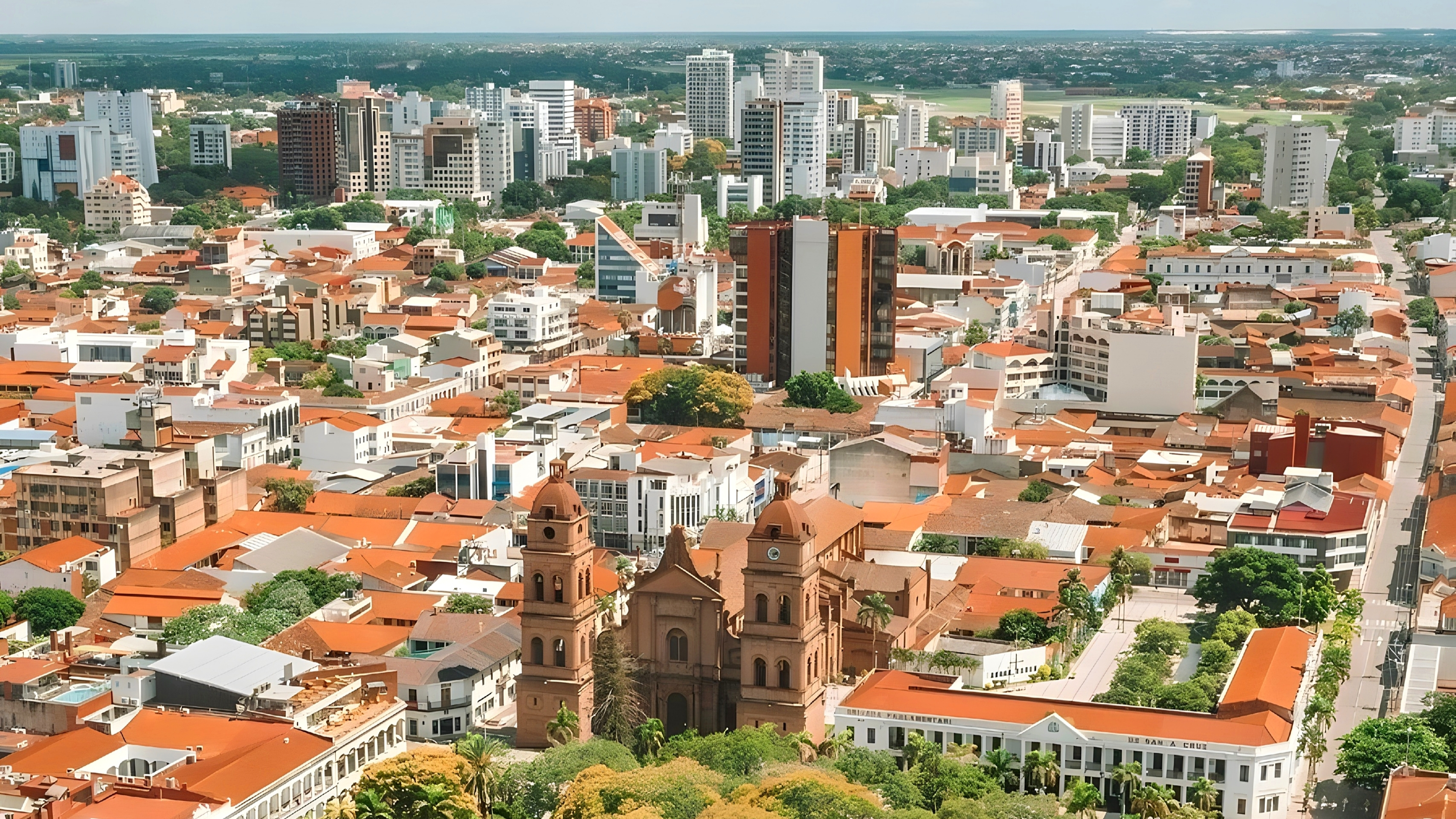
Historic Center

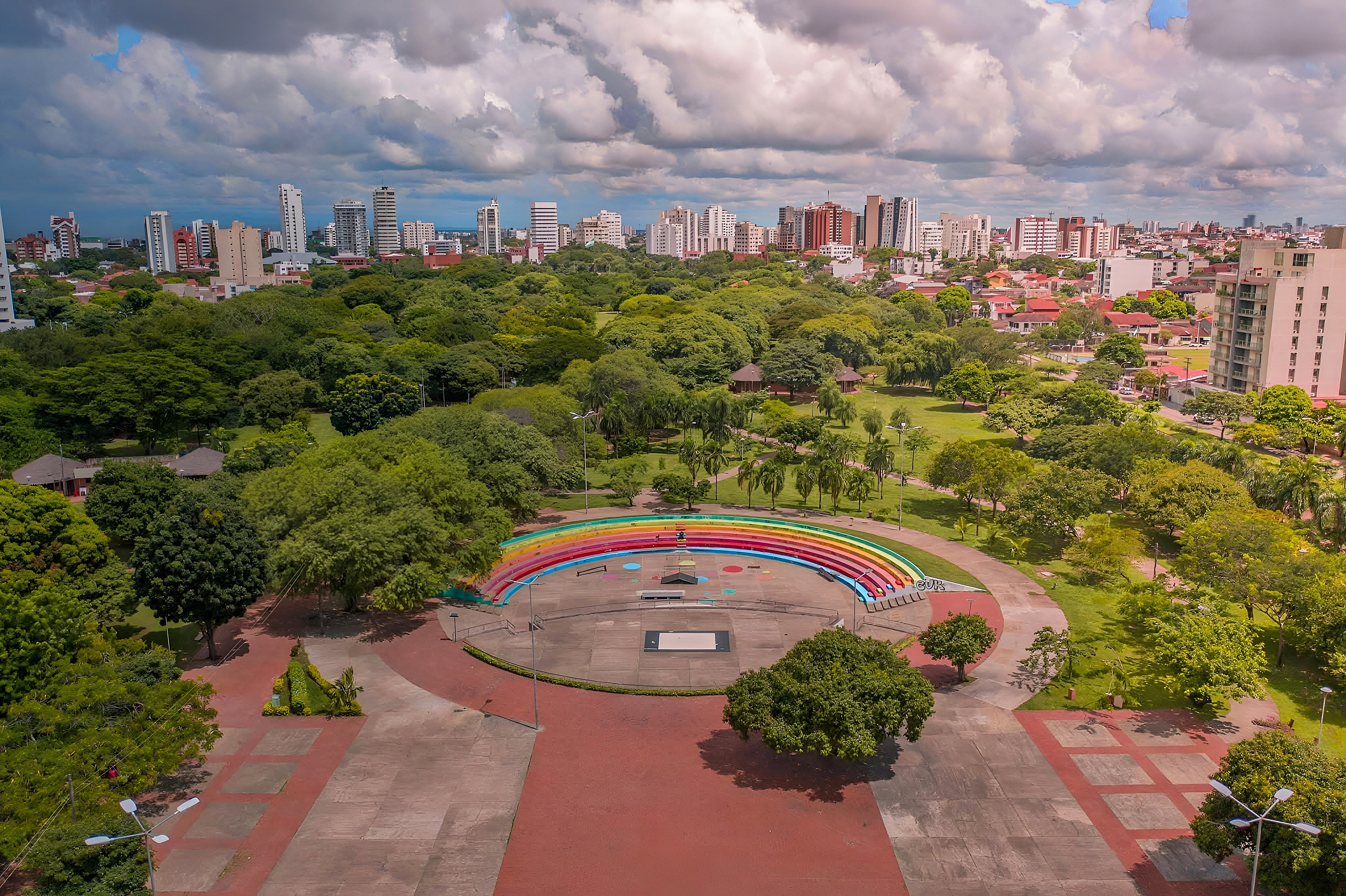
South Zone

Santa Cruz de la Sierra has consolidated its position as Bolivia's main real estate center in recent years, driven by its population growth, which will exceed three million by 2024, and by the arrival of internal migrants. The high proportion of young people, representing more than 60% of the population, has boosted demand for apartments and high-rise buildings, replacing traditional housing.

Between 2020 and 2023, more than one million square meters were built annually, and in 2023, 51 towers of ten floors or more were registered, reaching a total of 261. Growth was especially concentrated in District 5, with nearly 43% of construction licenses. In the same year, an average of 399 properties were sold per month, compared to 285 in 2022, with a predominance of cash transactions.

Although the sector faces higher material costs and a slowdown in projections (estimated between 0.5% and 1.5% annually), it continues to be one of the main drivers of investment in the city, supported by the expansion of the middle class and Santa Cruz's role as the country's economic capital.

=== Vertical growth ===
In recent decades, Santa Cruz de la Sierra has experienced significant real estate growth, reflected in the construction of skyscrapers and high-rise complexes. Economic expansion, population growth, and the concentration of business activities have driven the development of residential, corporate, and mixed-use towers, transforming the city's urban profile. These modern buildings have become benchmarks of contemporary architecture in Bolivia and mark the verticalization process of the city center and new areas such as Equipetrol and northern Santa Cruz.

Some of the major examples of this verticalization movement are:

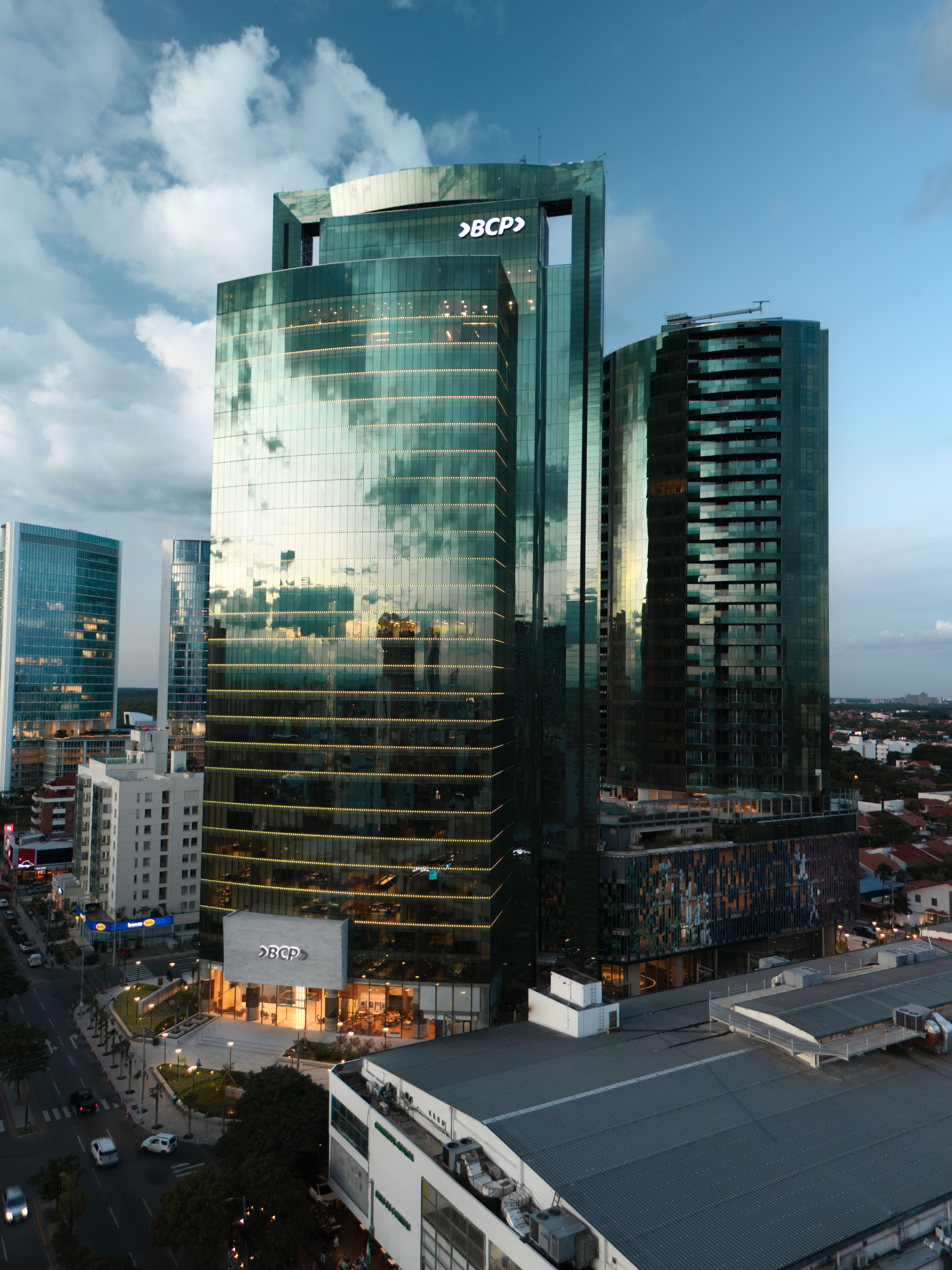
Green Tower Santa Cruz

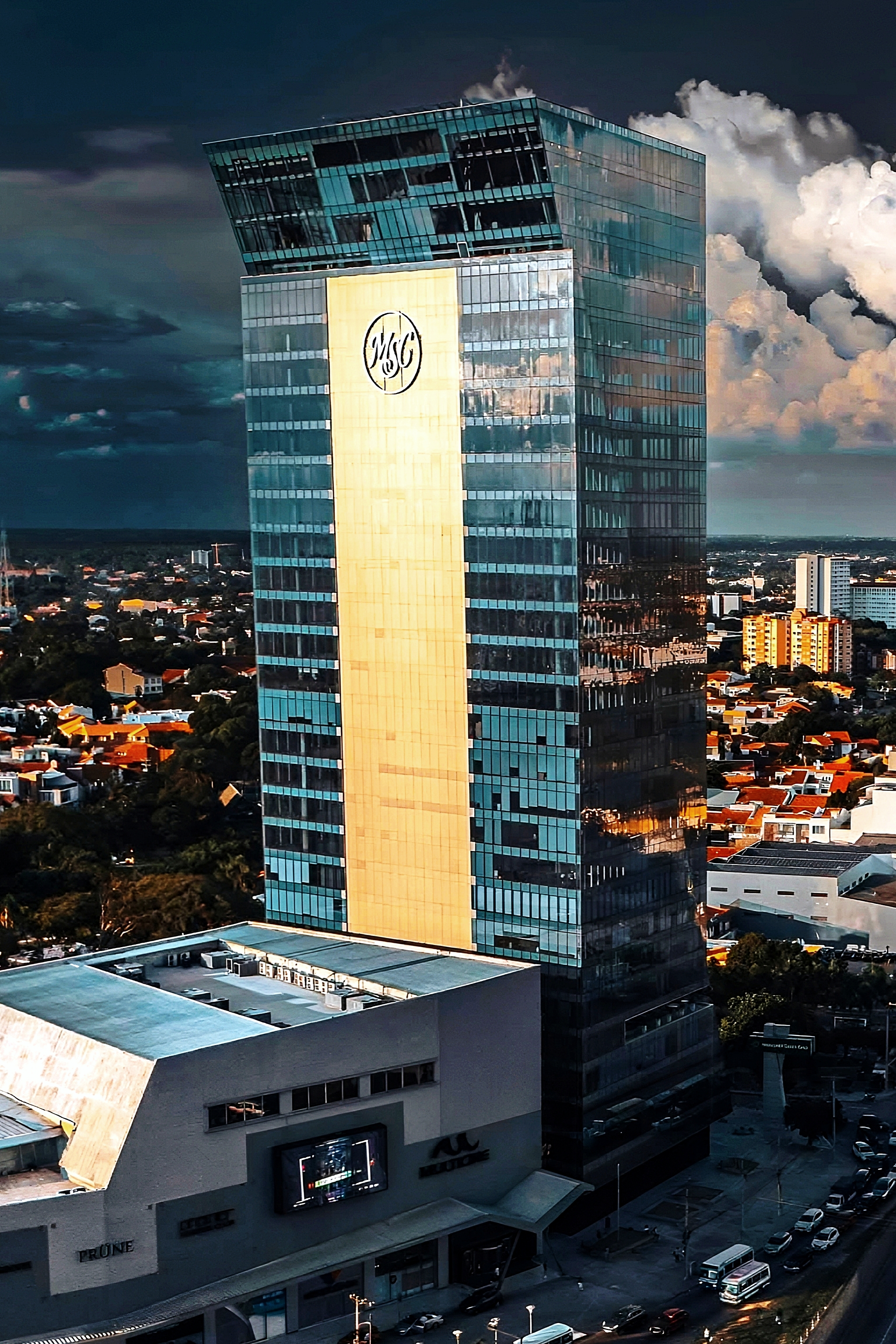
Santa Cruz Mercantile Tower

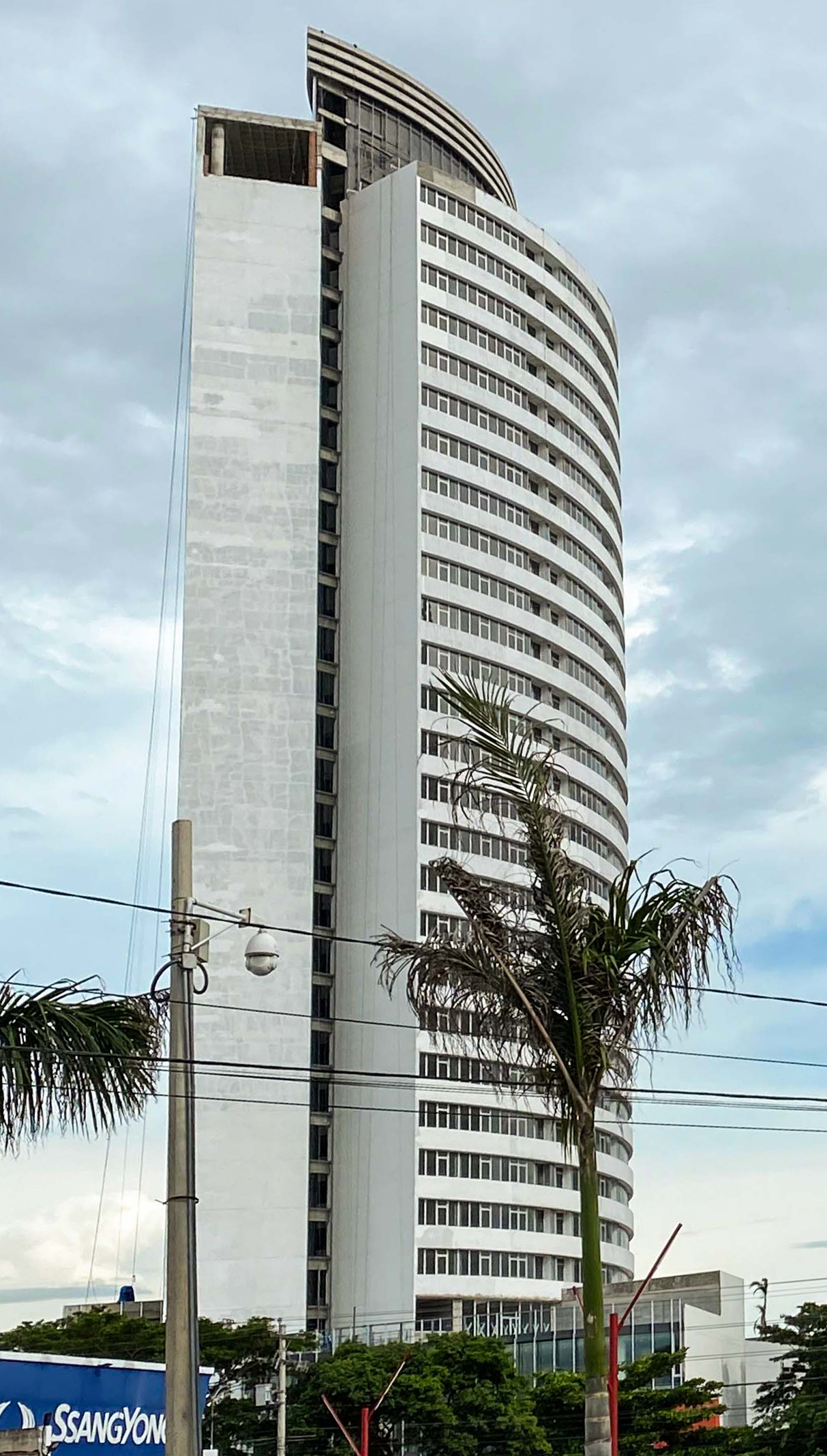
Platinum Tower II

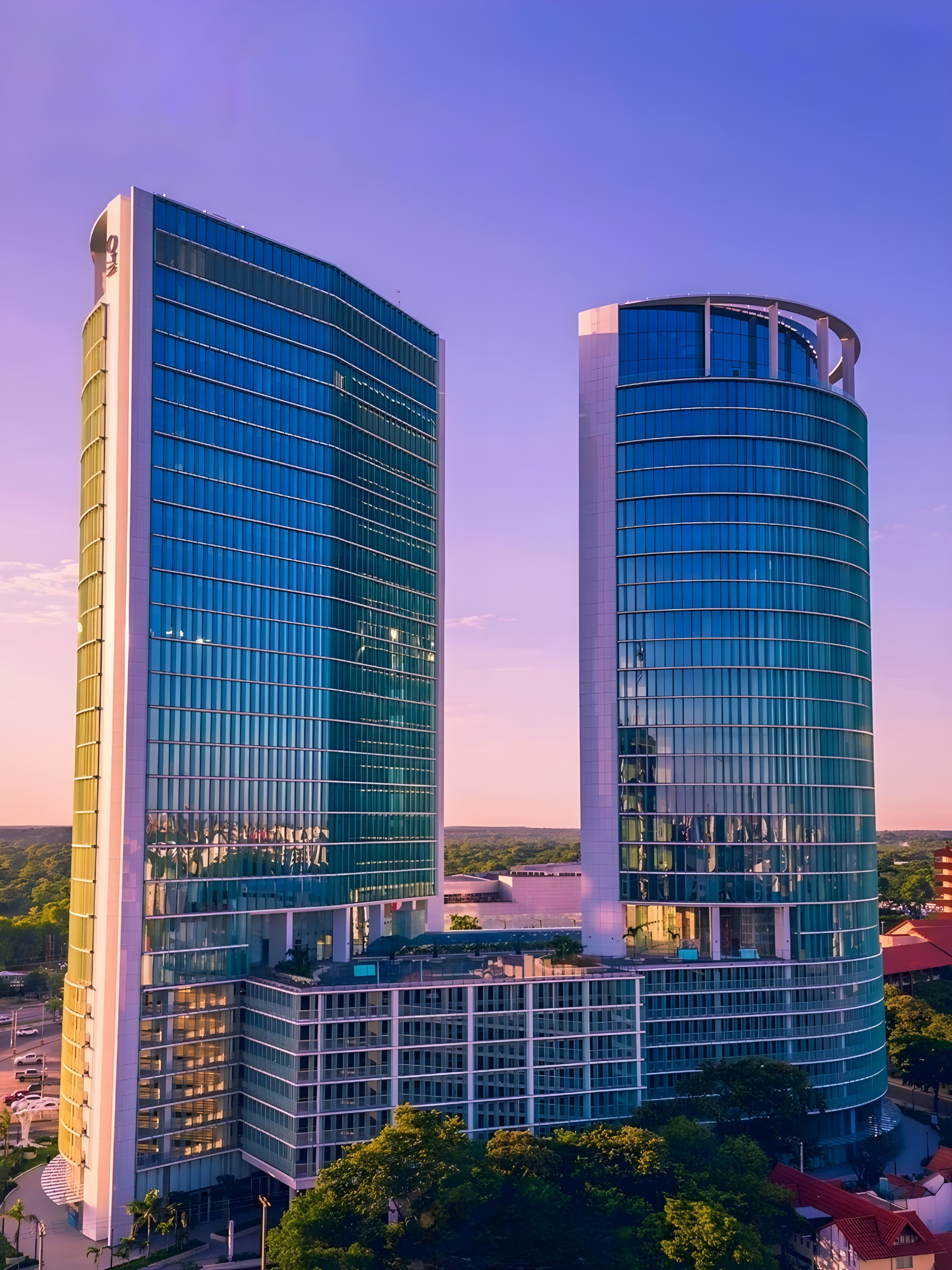
Manzana 40 Tower

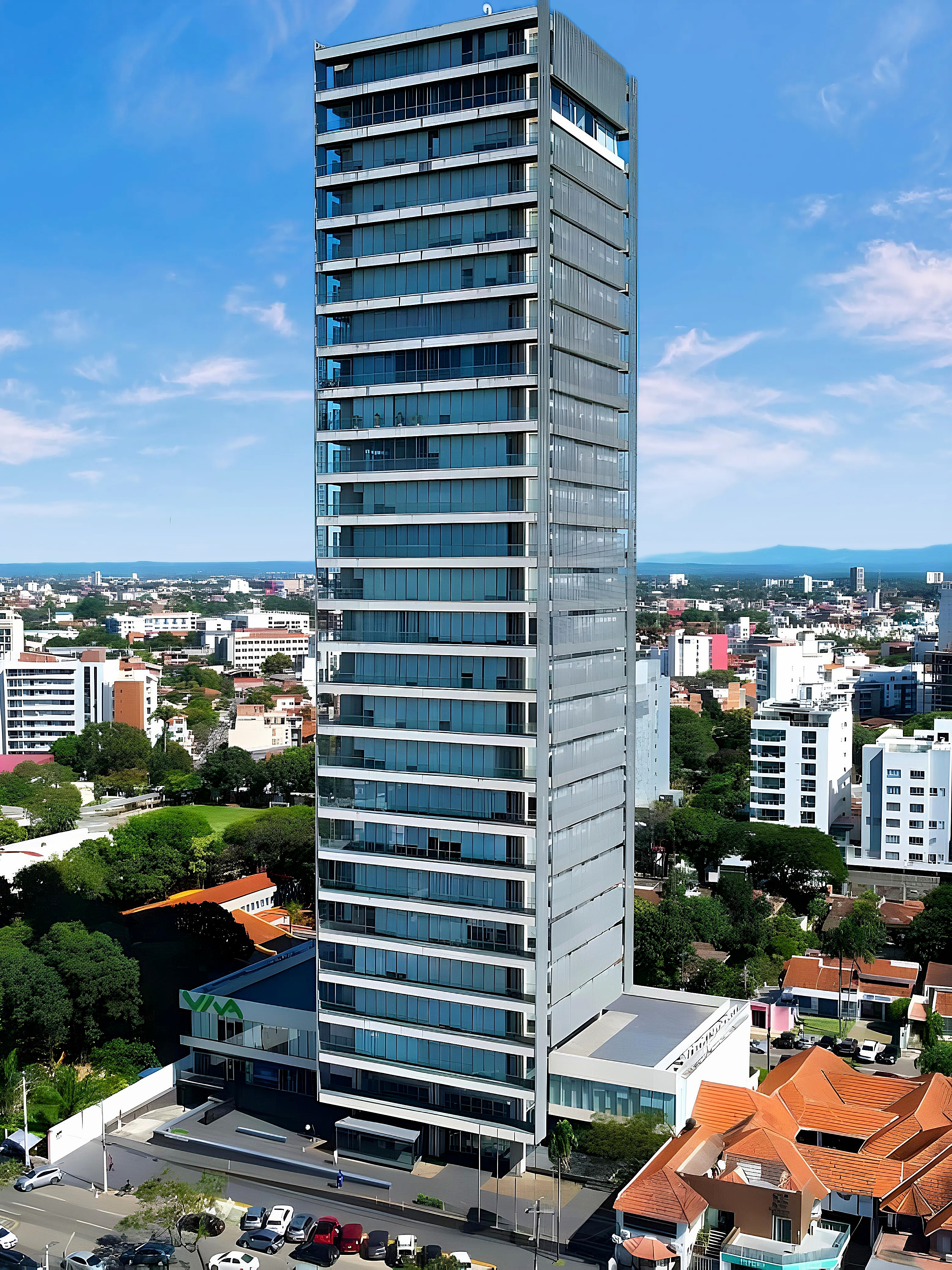
Ambassador Business Center

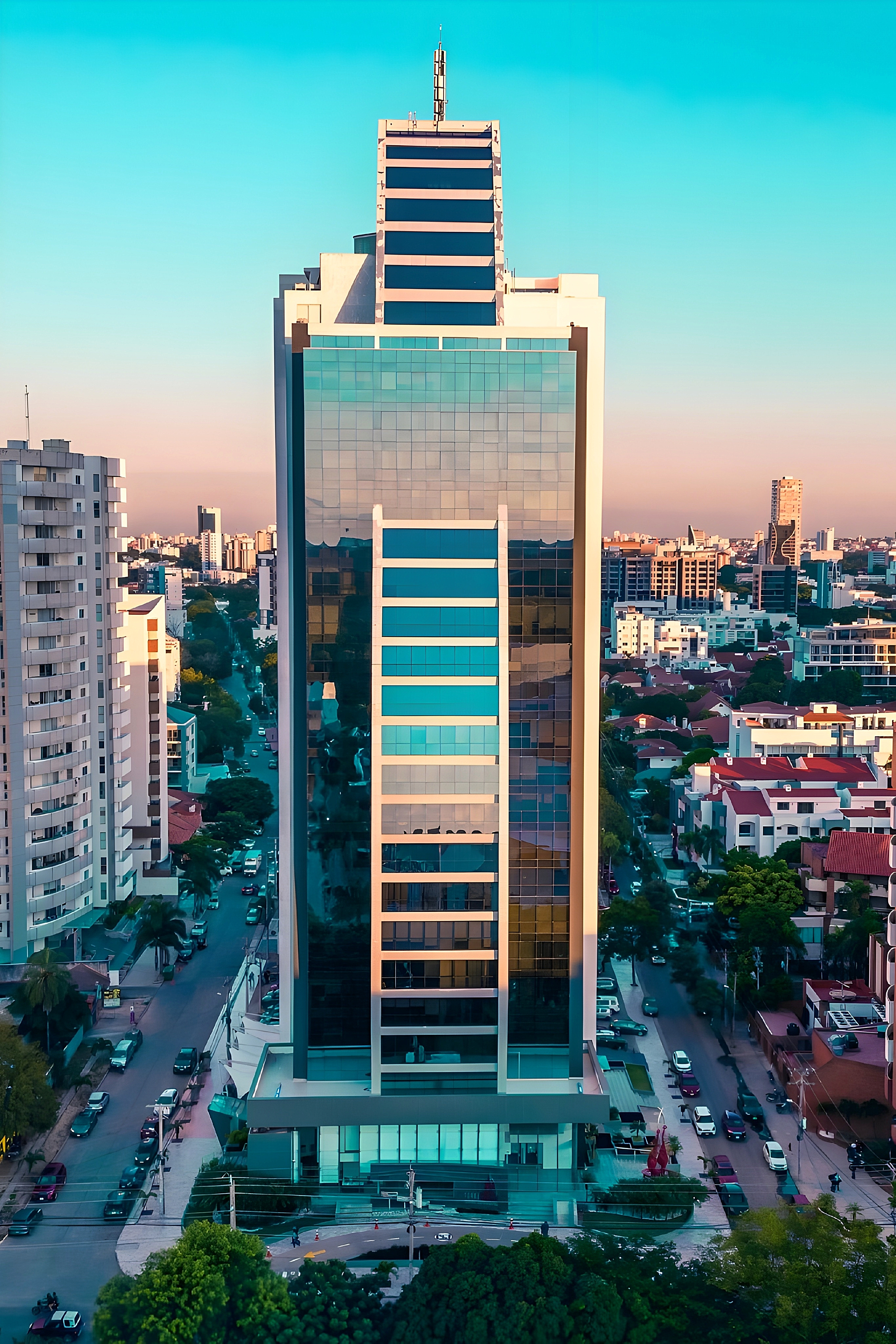
Duo Tower

=== Tourism ===
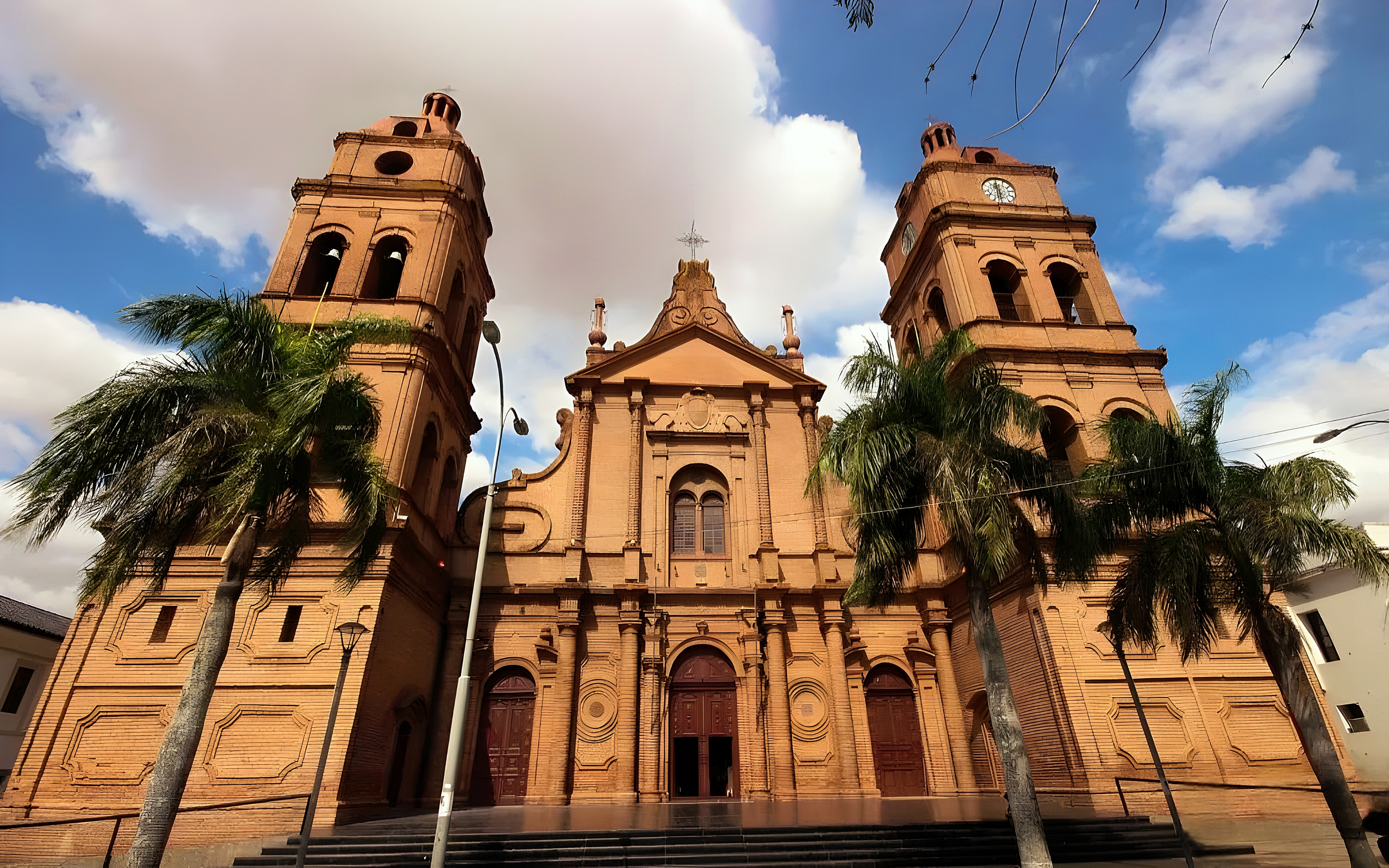
The main facade of the Cathedral Basilica of San Lorenzo, built in 1595.

Santa Cruz de la Sierra welcomes a third of the country's domestic tourists, plus a small amount of international tourism. Some of the attractions in and around the city include:

- Metropolitan Cathedral Basilica of San Lorenzo was built by Friar Diego de Porres during the reign of the Spanish Viceroy Toledo. In 1770, Bishop Ramón de Herbosos rebuilt the church, entrusting the execution of the works to the chief sacristan Antonio Lombardo. During the reign of Marshal Andrés de Santa Cruz (1838), the old temple was replaced by a new eclectic-style church, designed by the French architect Felipe Bestres. It is notable for its wooden vaults and the pictorial decoration that covers them. Part of the original carved silver covering from the Jesuit mission of San Pedro de Moxos is preserved on the high altar. Four sculptural reliefs from the same mission are also on display.
- Plaza 24 de Septiembre: Several blocks around the main plaza, 24 de Septiembre, are colonial-style buildings. Here you'll find the House of Culture, the Departmental Prefecture, the Municipal Mayor's Office, the Metropolitan Cathedral, several interesting museums, and exhibition halls.

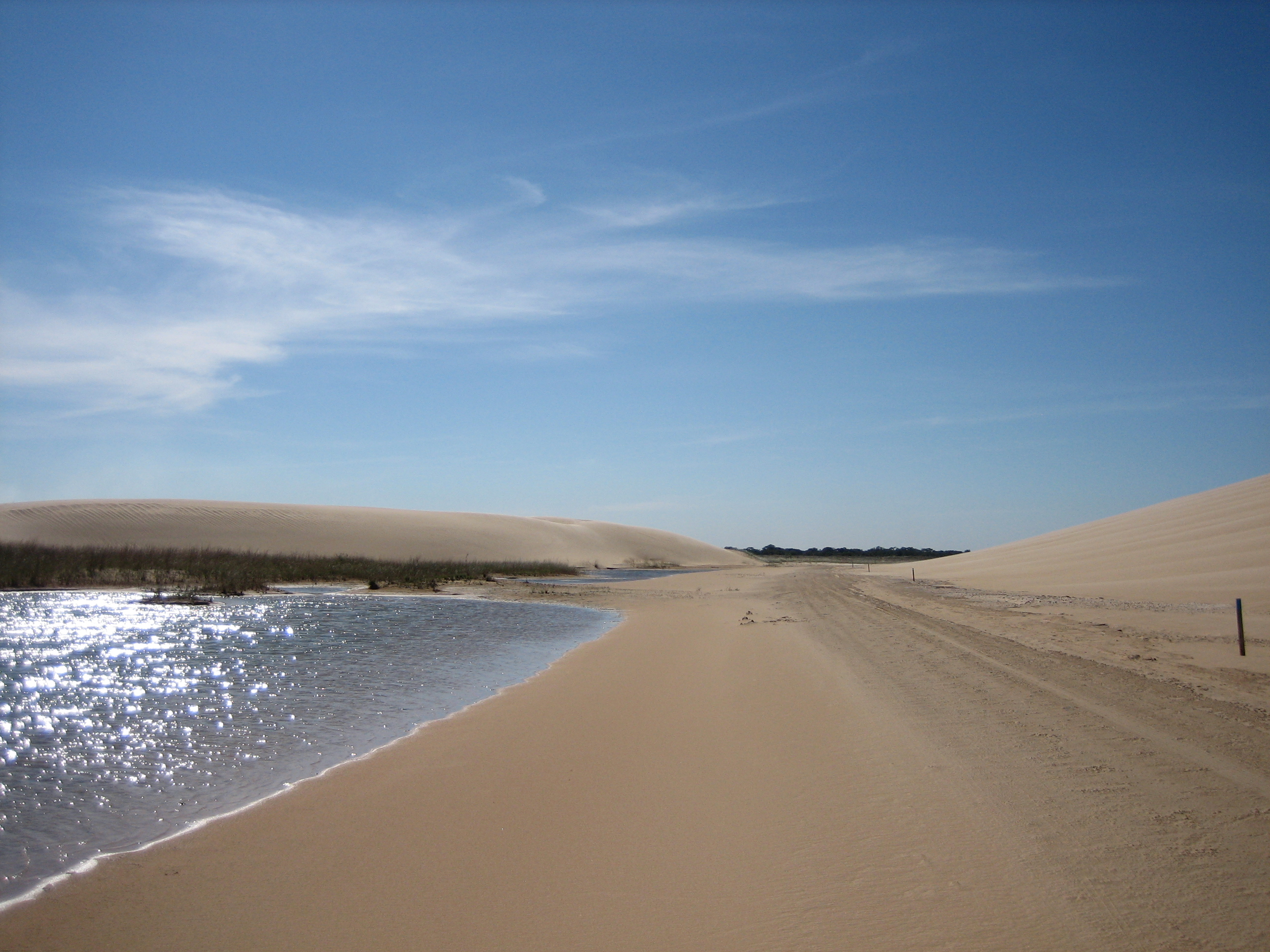
The Lomas de Arena

- Lomas de Arena Regional Park: This protected area is shared with the municipalities of La Guardia and Cabezas, featuring white sand dunes created by wind erosion, distributed around lagoons where water sports are practiced. Its beauty is comparable to beaches due to the color of its sand.
- Monseñor Rivero Avenue, a pleasant boulevard in the city, is home to entertainment venues, including restaurants, cafes, ice cream parlors, and pastry shops.
- Playland amusement park
- The Noel Kempff Mercado South American Fauna Zoo is an exclusive tropical wildlife reserve with semi-wild specimens, including unique species such as the spectacled bear (jucumari), the sloth, multicolored macaws, jaguars, and other species.
- Carnaval Cruceño: It is one of the most popular and colorful celebrations in Bolivia, especially in the eastern part of the country. It is characterized by its festive atmosphere, lively comparsas, float parades, and the election of the Carnival Queen, the central figure of the celebration.

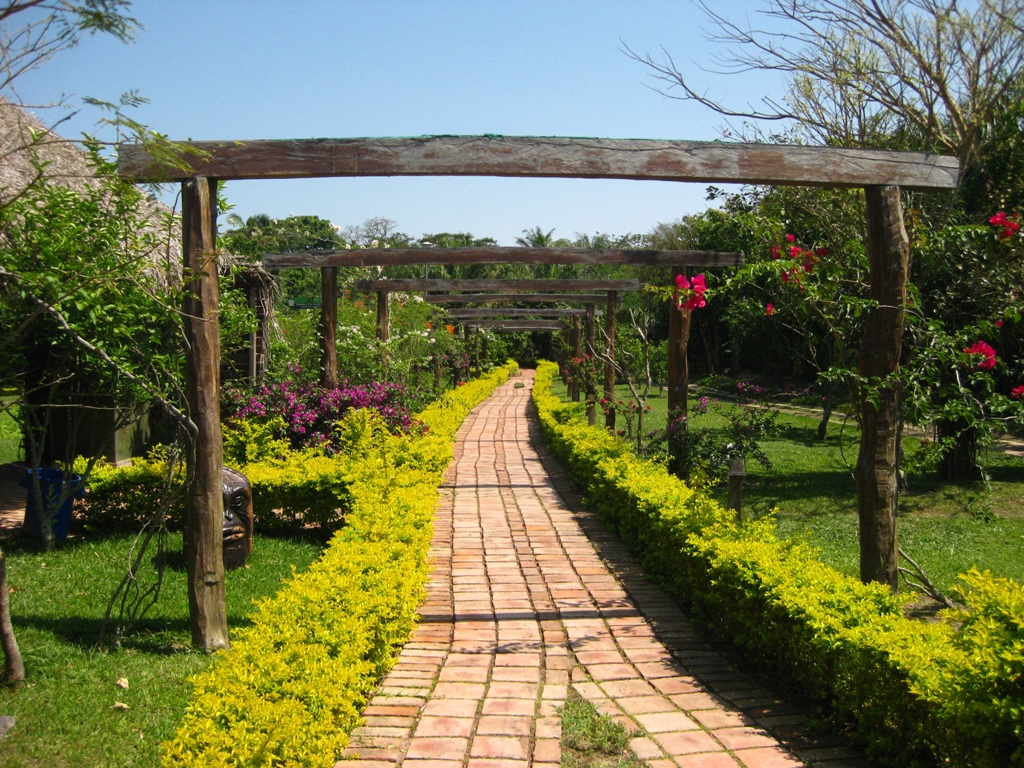
The Güembé Biocenter, a 24-hectare nature reserve that houses exotic flora and fauna typical of the region.

- Güembé Biocenter, La Rinconada, and the Yvaga Guazú Ecological Park, among others. All are important centers or complexes for natural delights and ecological trails. The first features a large number of natural-style pools with lagoons and walkways through a butterfly house and a large aviary with a large ecological viewing platform. The second is a place filled with nature, lush gardens, lagoons, and a pool. The third is filled with vegetation, green trails, and wild animals all around.
- The city also attracts people from all over the world for cosmetic surgery due to its low cost.
- Cabañas del Río Piraí: Located in the western part of the capital, at the end of Roca and Coronado Avenues, they offer beautiful views of the riverbanks. The cabins offer delicious traditional dishes. The Piraí River is a popular spot on hot days. You can also go horseback riding or ATV riding along the river beaches, and enjoy tarpon net fishing from March to June.

== Urban infrastructure ==
=== Architecture and urban planning ===
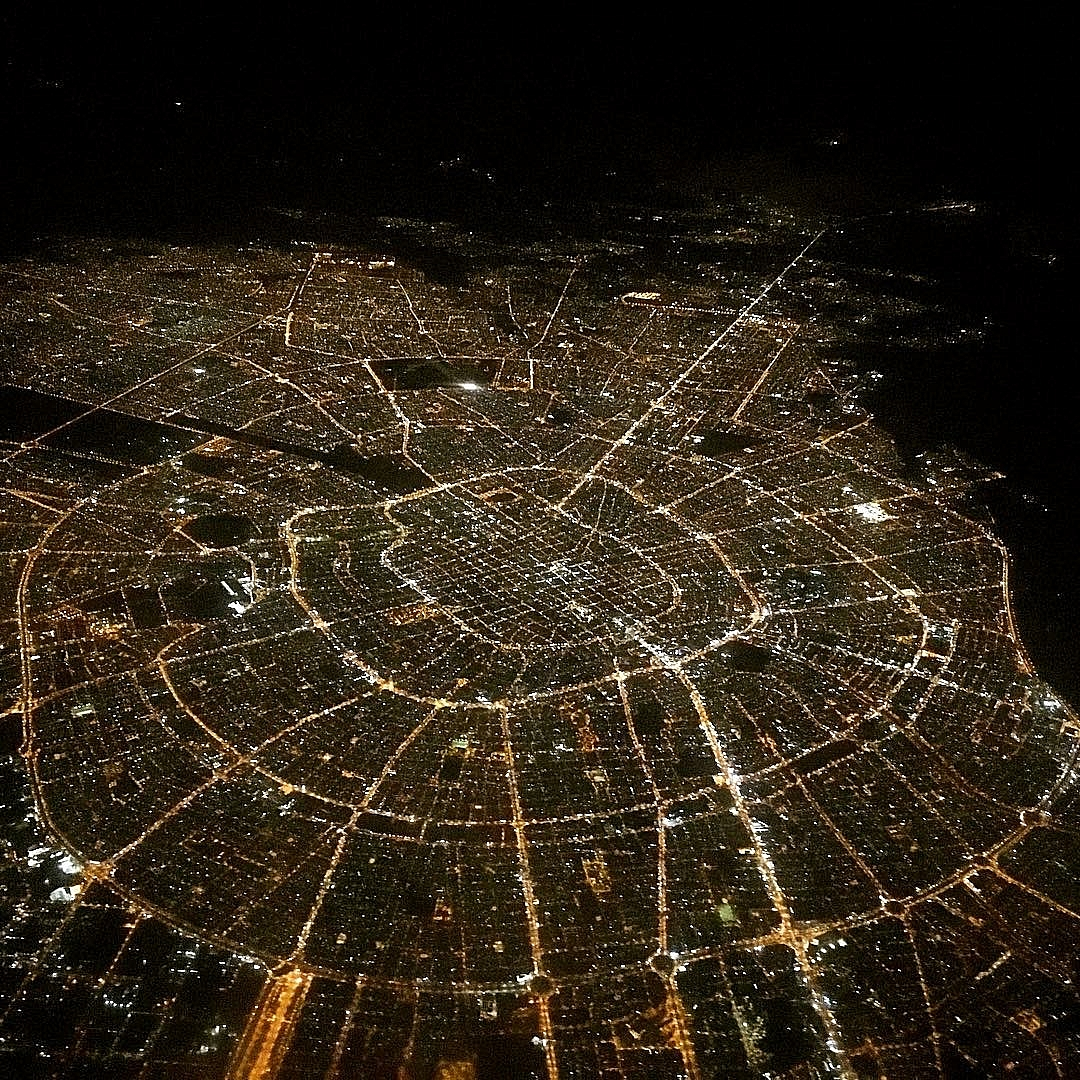
The city has a radial urban layout.

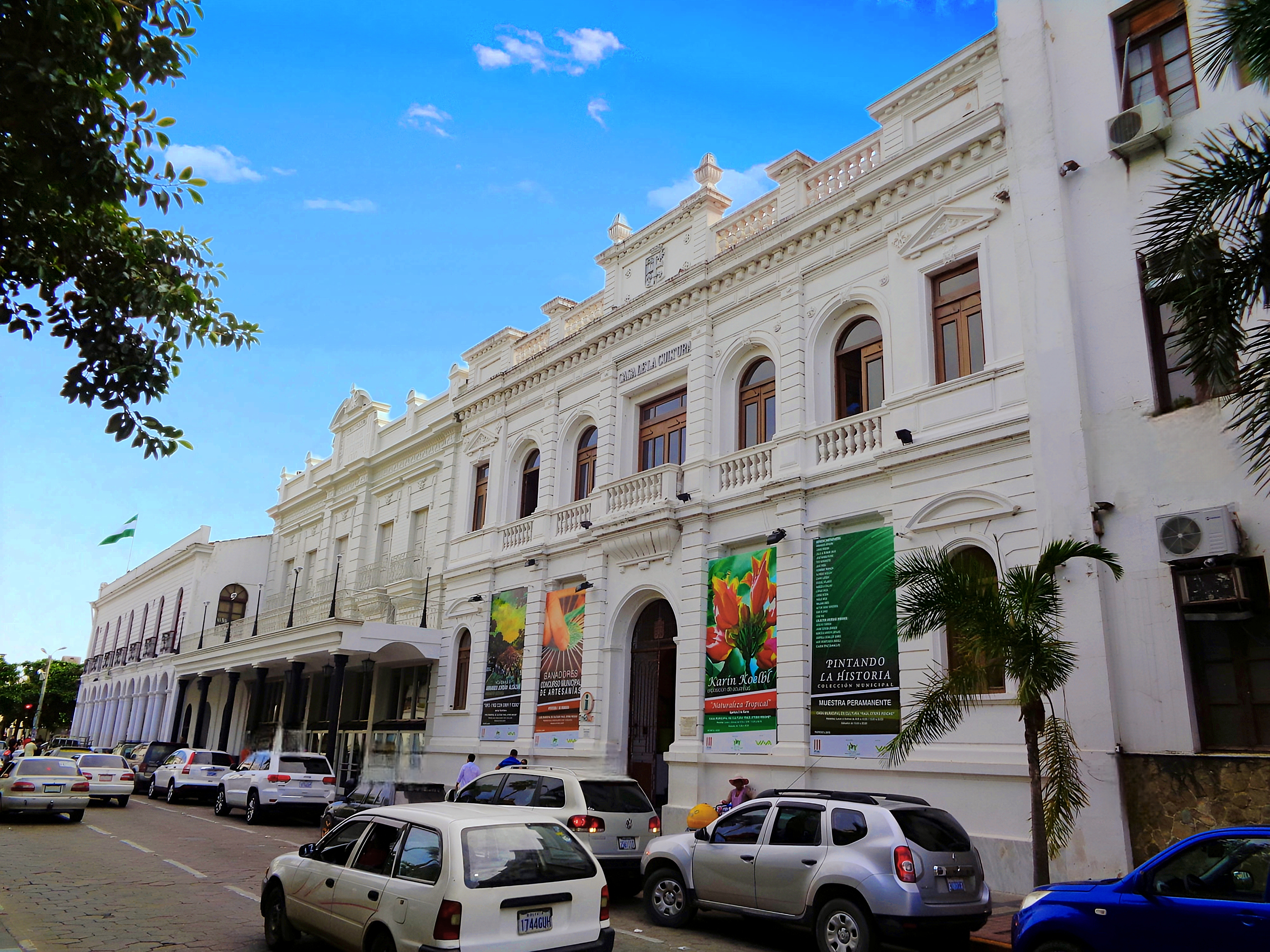
Historic buildings around the city center.

From an urban planning perspective, the city center is delimited by a main network of streets laid out in the traditional Spanish style, which organized the space in similar blocks, locating the main religious, government, and economic buildings around a central plaza. This sector in Santa Cruz constitutes the "old town," structured around the main square or main square. After this central block, the ring network begins. A road system of surrounding avenues, from which other avenues called "radials" branch off, dispersing in multiple directions. The city is made up of 10 concentric ring roads, each 1 to 2 km apart, and 27 radial roads that branch off from the first ring road and cross the entire city. The city was planned to have four ring roads by 2000, but given the city's rapid population growth, many peripheral neighborhoods affected the layout of the rings above the fourth. The location of the Piraí River (Bolivia) is the natural limit for the layout of some rings.

The city has experienced significant growth in road traffic; related projects include a tunnel under the El Trompillo Airport runway, which connected the interrupted section of the fourth ring road in the southern part of the city. Another important work is the overpasses at the intersections of the 4th, 5th, 6th and 7th ring roads with Av. Cristo Redentor, among others.

=== Parks and gardens ===
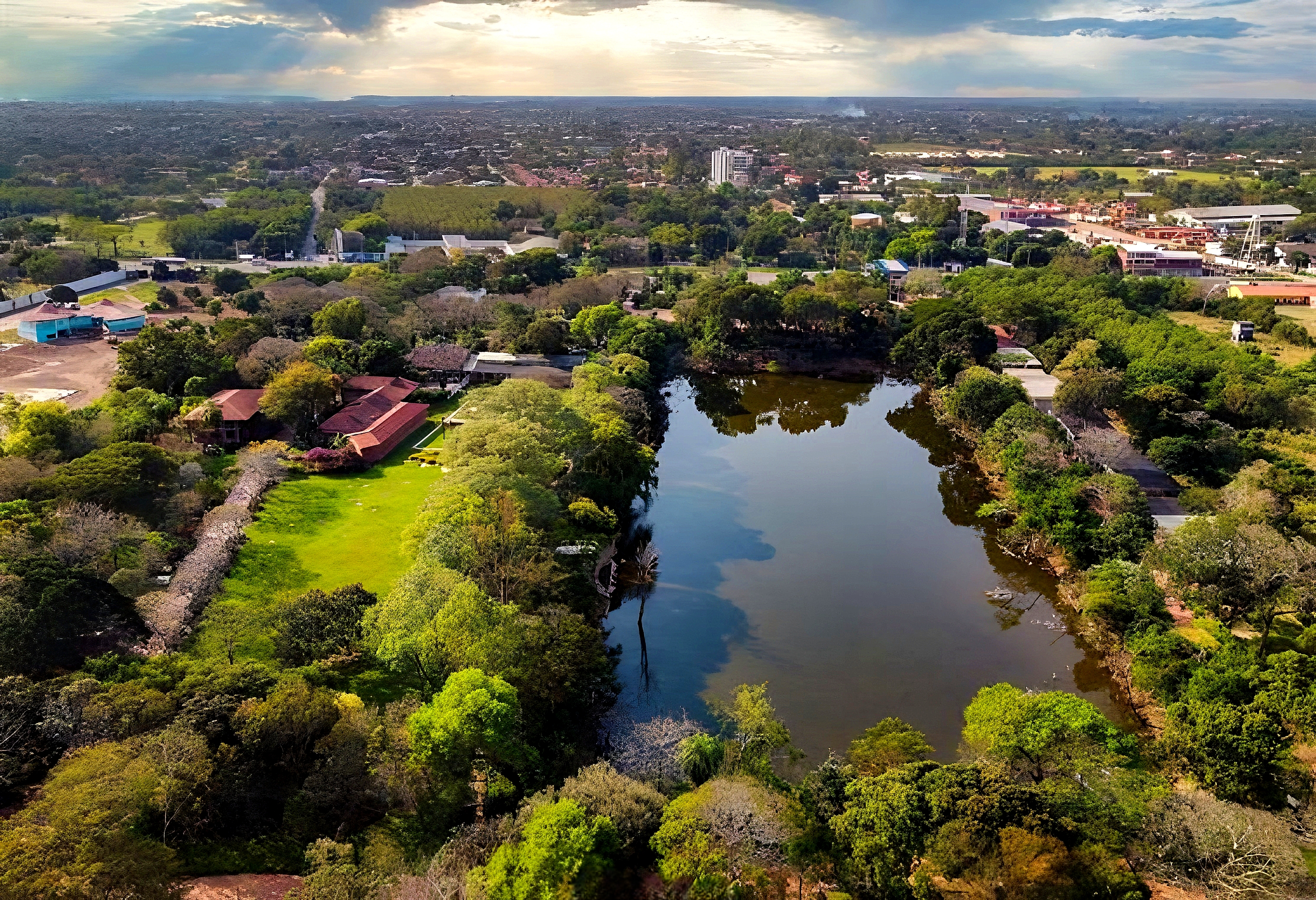
The Botanical Garden of Santa Cruz de la Sierra

The largest parks in Santa Cruz are located in the city's different districts and are known as Urban Parks. Several of these parks are surrounded by fences for security. In the city center is Parque El Arenal, which stands out for its lagoon and island, and also serves as the area's rainwater reservoir. This park is home to Lorgio Vaca's mural. Along the city's first ring road, a series of trees have been planted, converting the central median into a garden with a promenade. A little further out, between Avenida Argentina and the second, is Central Urban Park, where sports activities are possible. It is decorated with dinosaurs and has dancing fountains where different types of music play and the waters move to the rhythm of the song. Other notable parks are the park outside the El Trompillo Airport, which also has dancing waters, the Blacutt square and the General Cemetery. On the second ring road in the northeast there is a small park that houses the Pirate Plane, which is a Lockheed Constellation aircraft seized by the Bolivian Air Force and converted into a tourist attraction. Already on the outskirts of the city, on the avenue to Cotoca, is the Botanical Garden, which has about 500 cataloged species of flora and another 1,000 varieties yet to be cataloged.

== Culture ==
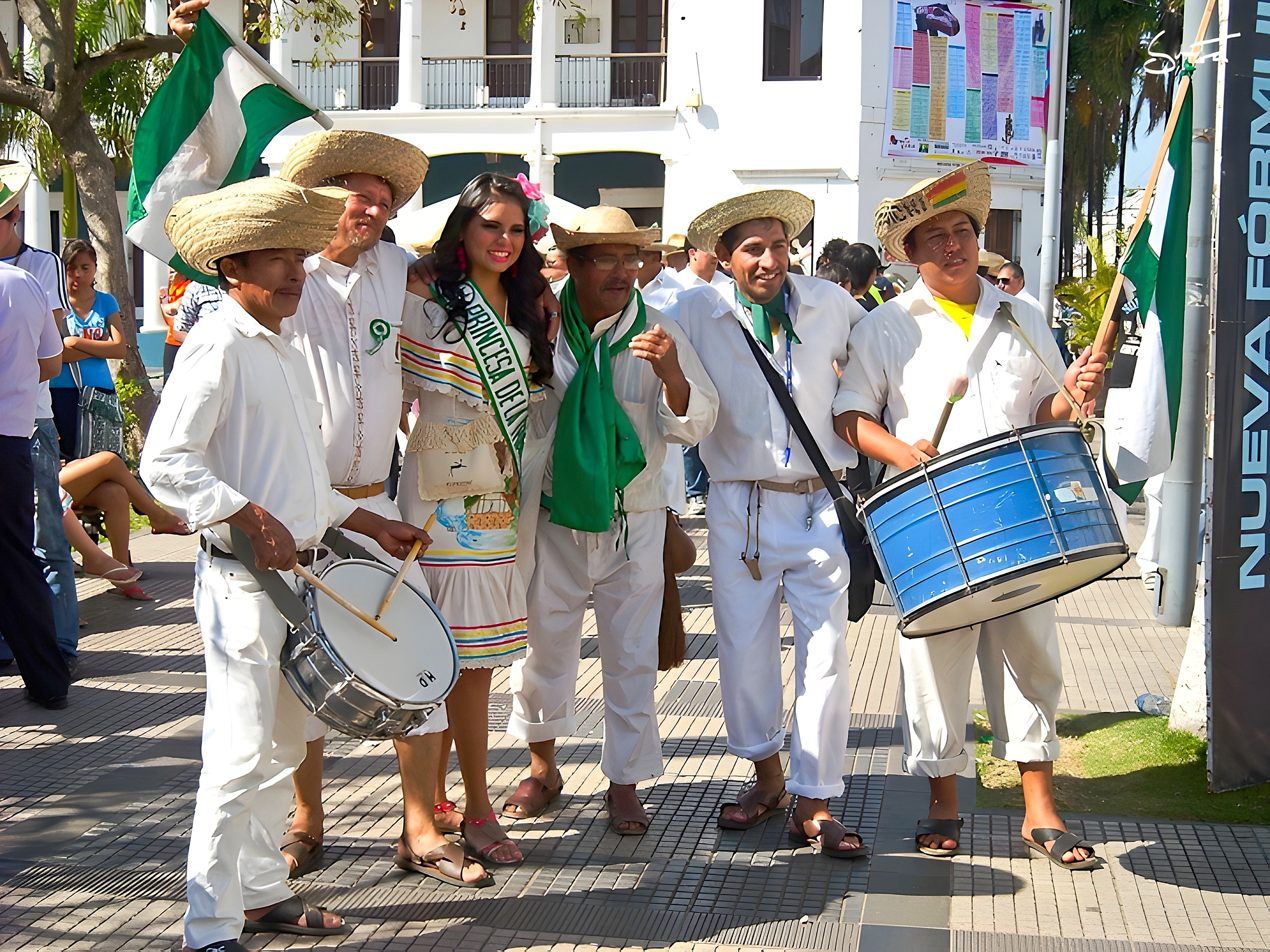
Camba clothing, typical of the eastern plains and the department of Santa Cruz

The culture of the department and city of Santa Cruz is of mestizo origin, with mostly Spanish, European contributions and others of indigenous origin, from the Guarani, Chiquitanos, and from the Amazon (Arawaks).

=== Carnival ===
The preparations for the Santa Cruz de la Sierra Carnival begin in December, two to three months beforehand, with its famous pre-Carnival parades, followed by the three-day holiday where people dance in the comparsas or groups formed by these groups, who celebrate in style in large parking lots where they organize to have international and national artists offer massive parties. There's also a stroll through the city center for a more popular, village-based carnival.

=== Dances ===
In Santa Cruz de la Sierra, it is common to see dances from throughout the department and other regions of the country, as well as international folklore.

The city's most distinctive traditional dances are: the carnavalito cruceño, the brincao, the chovena, the taquirari, and the sarao.

=== Gastronomy ===
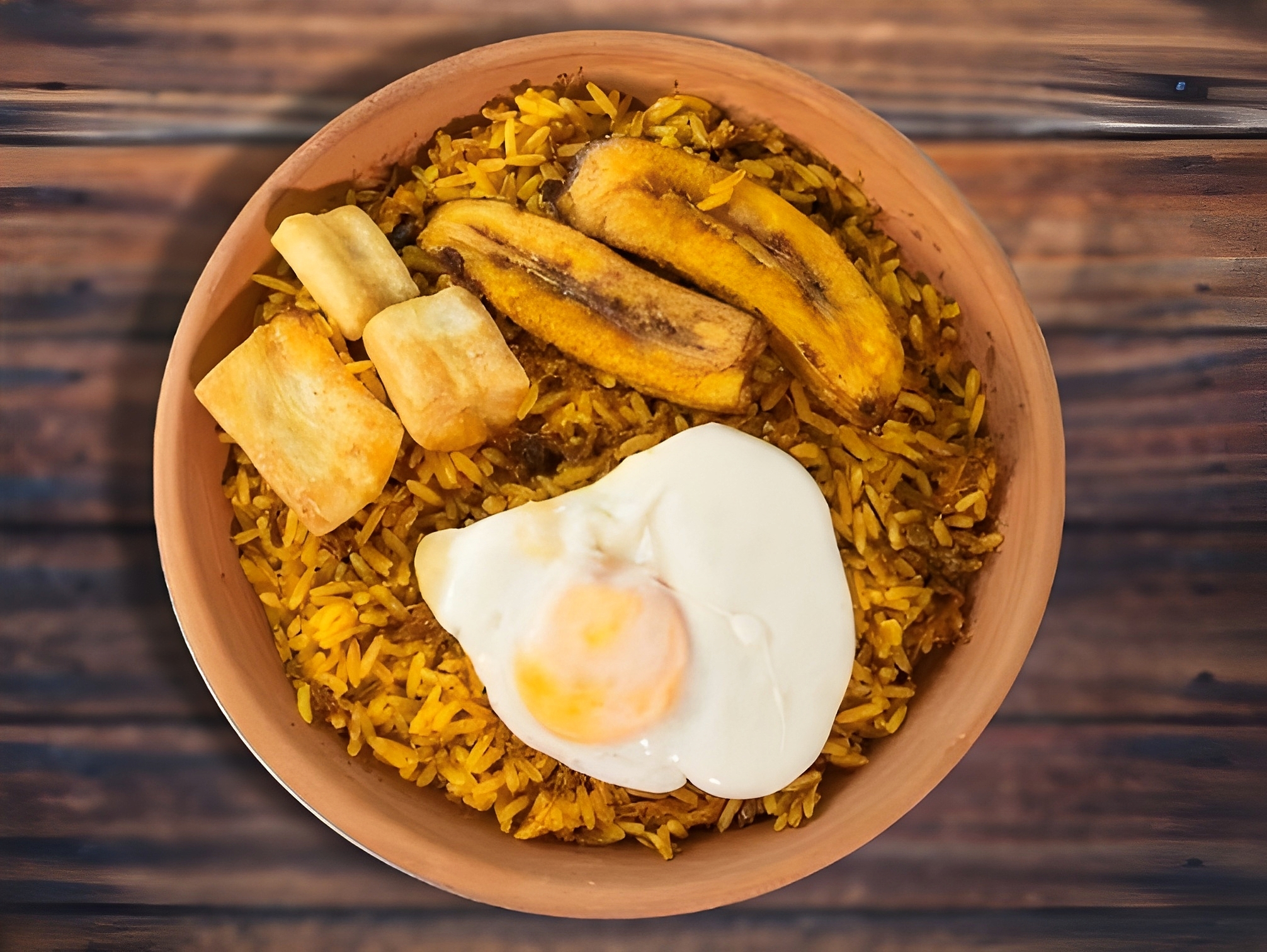
Majadito is a traditional dish from Santa Cruz. The original version does not include beef

Typical foods:

- Majao, mashed or mashed
- Locro dyed with urucú
- Locro cart
- Peanut Soup
- Rapi in juice
- Keperí
- Stuffed chicken neck
- Patasca
- Surubí Chicharrón
- Pacumuto
- Baked Tamale
- Tamale in a pot
- Rice Empanada
- Cheese Empanada
- Jigote Empanada
- Meat Empanada
- Chicken Empanada
- Corn Empanada
- Charque Empanada
- Choclo Masaco * Plantain (a mixture of plantain and jerky)
- Yucca Masaco (a mixture of yuca and jerky)
- Cheese Masaco (a mixture of cheese and plantain)
- Arepas
- Covered Soup

Traditional Drinks:

- Somó
- Mocochinchi
- Chicha Camba

Typical pastries (baked camba):

- Cuñapé
- Sponge-shaped cuñapé
- Sonso (or Zonzo)
- Corn-fried bread
- Rice bread
- Wheat cake
- Queque

=== Museums, cultural centers, and art galleries ===
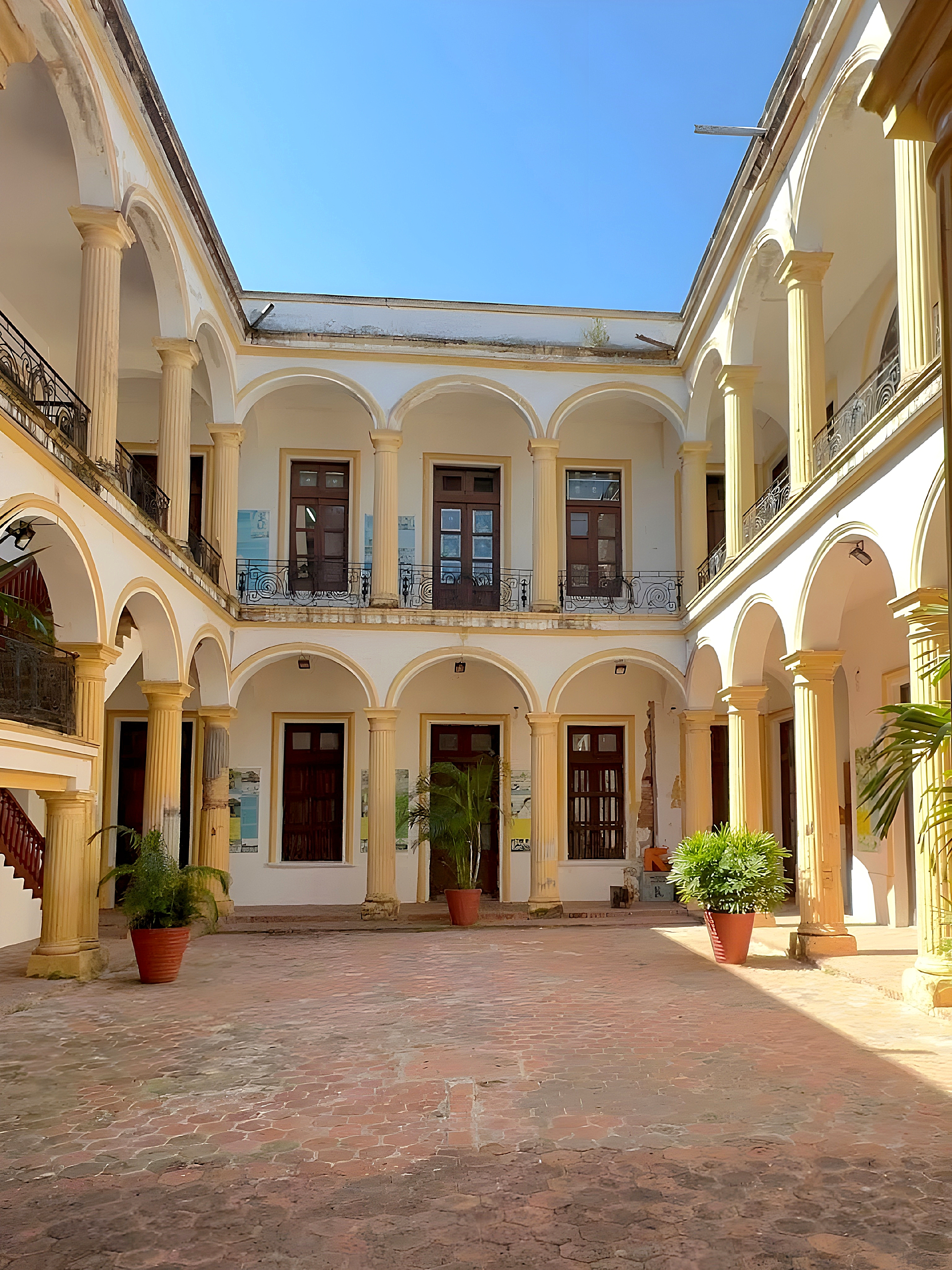
Interior of the Santa Cruz History Museum

The city of Santa Cruz de la Sierra offers a circuit of artistic and/or cultural spaces with different themes; from natural history to sacred art to the latest in contemporary art.

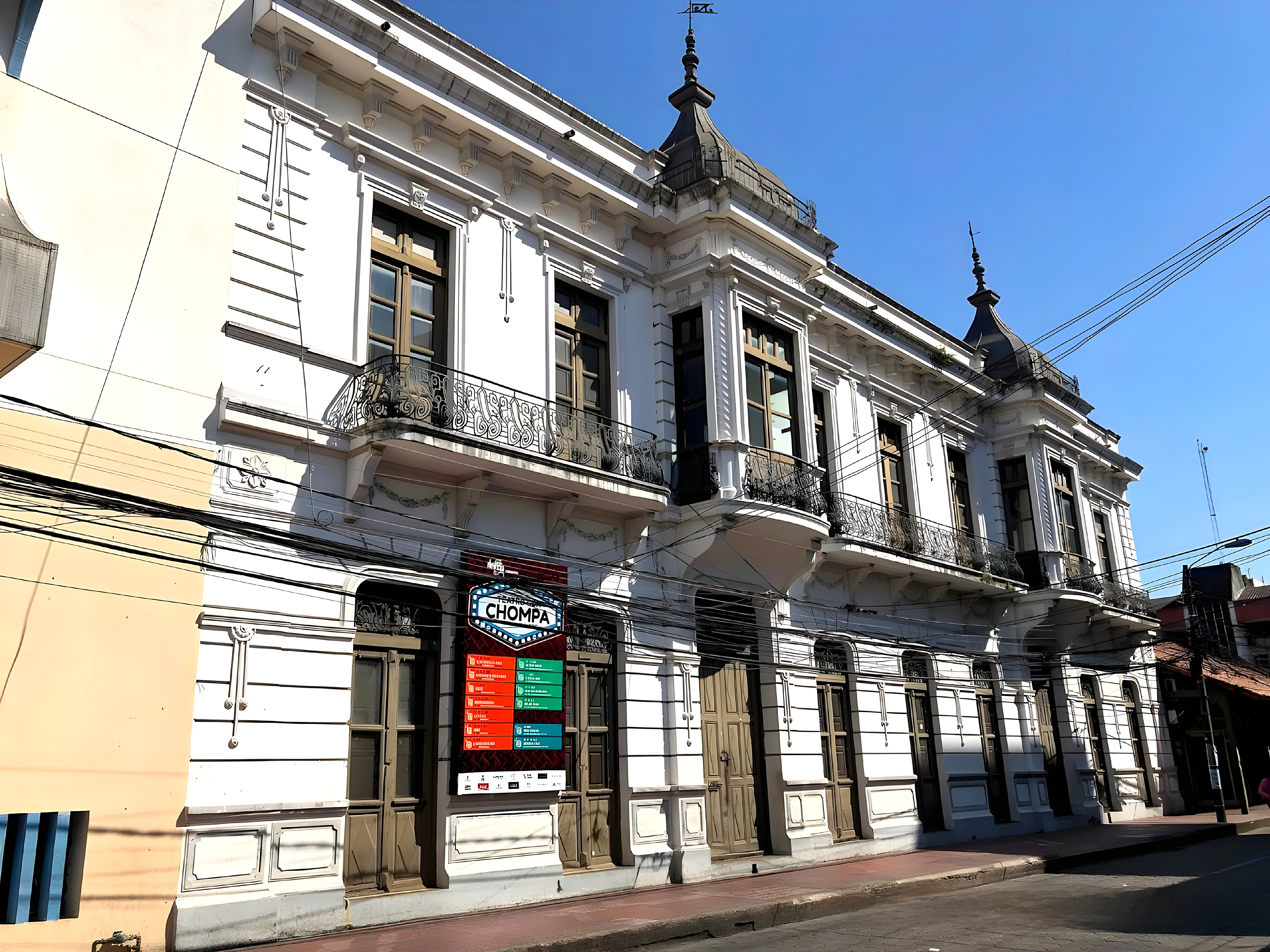
Santa Cruz Regional History Museum

- Raúl Otero Reiche Cultural Center
- Museo de Historia Natural Noel Kempff Mercado

Research and outreach center that exhibits the flora, fauna, paleontology, minerals, and rocks of the Department of Santa Cruz. Noel Kempff Mercado was a Bolivian scientist born in Santa Cruz de la Sierra, one of the driving forces behind nature conservation in Bolivia.

- Lieutenant General German Busch Becerra National Historical Museum
- Museum of History and Regional Historical Archive
- Guaraní Museum
- Cathedral Museum of Sacred Art
- Museum of Art and Archaeology
- Independence Museum
- Museum of Contemporary Art
- Manzana Uno Art Space
- Santa Cruz Cultural Center
- Simón Iturri Patiño Cultural Center
- Spanish Cooperation Training Center
- Feliciana Rodríguez Cultural Center
- Franco-German Cultural Center
- Kiosk Gallery
- Búho Blanco Art Gallery
- Axioma Art Gallery
- La Florida

=== International festivals, fairs, and shows ===
- FENAVID, International Festival of Cinema
- Santa Cruz Ibero-American Film Festival
- International Wine and Cheese Festival
- Chiquitos Missions Baroque and Renaissance Music Festival
- Livestock Fair
- EXPOCRUZ, the largest exhibition fair in Bolivia.
- International Book Fair

== Transport ==
=== Urban transportation ===
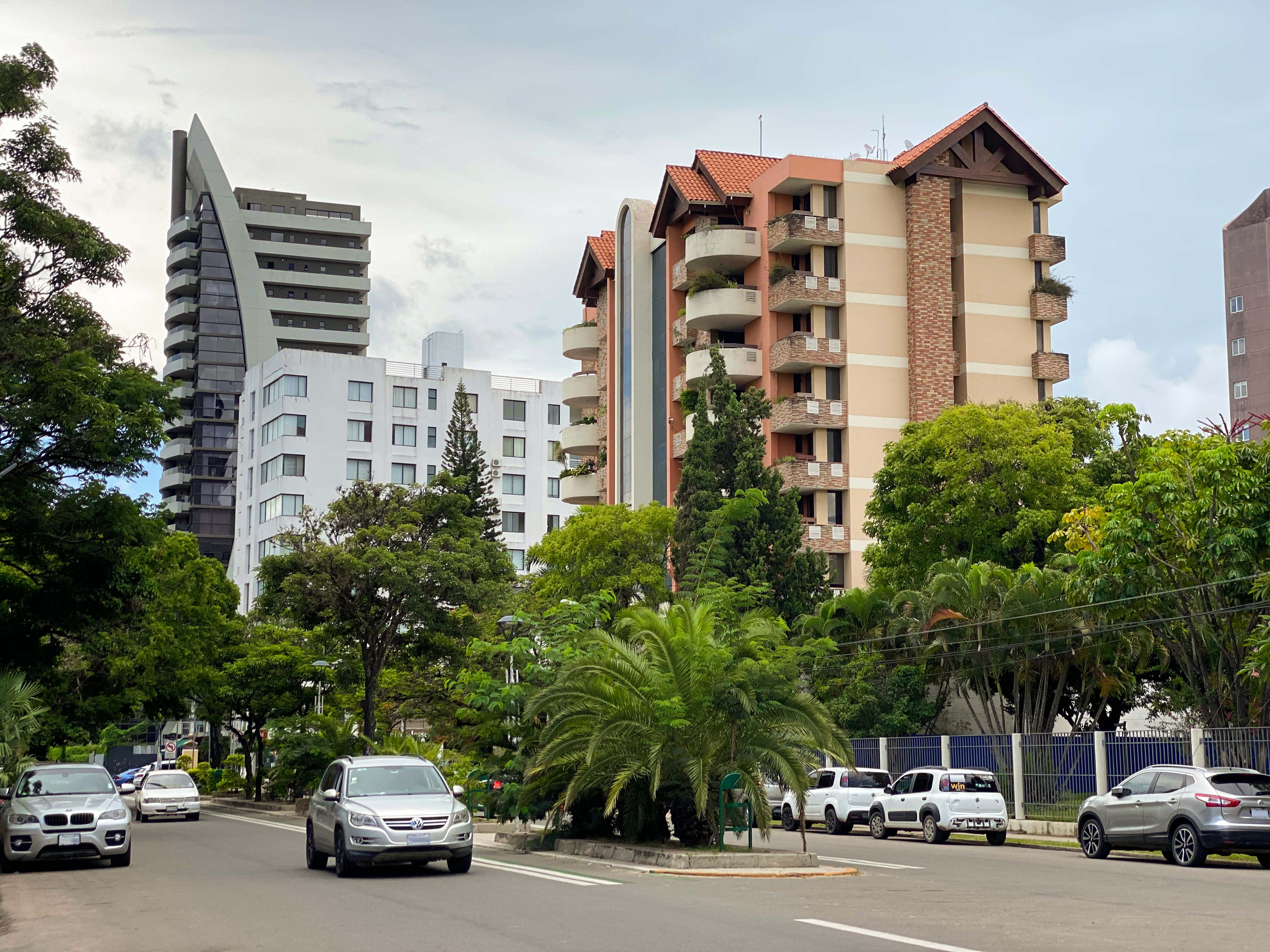
San Martín Avenue connects the 2nd and 3rd rings of the city.

The public transportation system includes buses that travel throughout the city on 132 routes. The service is privatized and managed by the Santa Cruz Bus and Collective Union. The poor administration and route planning are what most harm the city's traffic flow.

The best-known buses are the so-called "vuelteros" (buses that run along the city's various ring roads). They are named after typical animals from the province to identify the lines (e.g., Chuturubí (Pepsis Limbata) vueltero on the 1st ring road (RN7) and Tiluchi (Rufous hornero) vueltero on the 2nd ring road (RN9)).

=== Air transportation ===
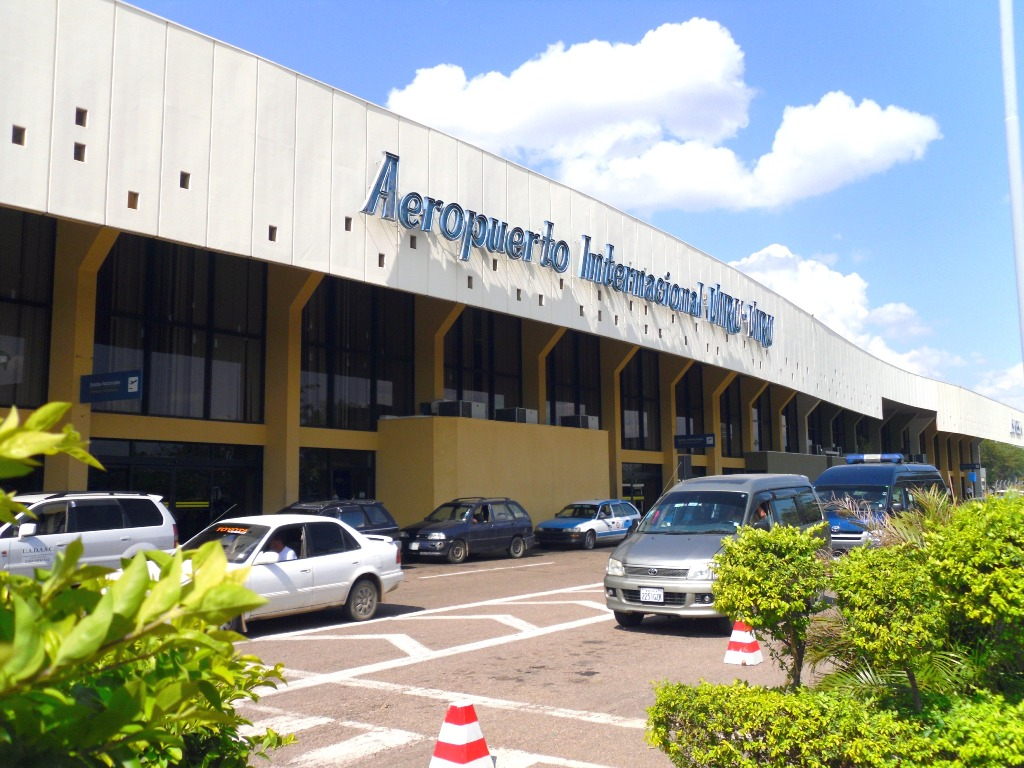
The Viru Viru International Airport hosts the majority of international flights in Bolivia

Santa Cruz de la Sierra has two airports: the Viru Viru International Airport, located 13 km north of the city in the jurisdiction of the Warnes municipality, which is the largest airport in Bolivia, and the El Trompillo International Airport (located in the southern part of the city).

These are the airlines that operate in the city:

- Amaszonas
- Aerosur
- Boliviana de Aviación
- Ecojet
- Military Air Transport
- Aerolíneas Argentinas
- Air Europa
- Boliviana de Aviación
- Copa Airlines
- Gol Airlines
- LATAM Airlines
- LATAM Peru
- Avianca
- Paranair

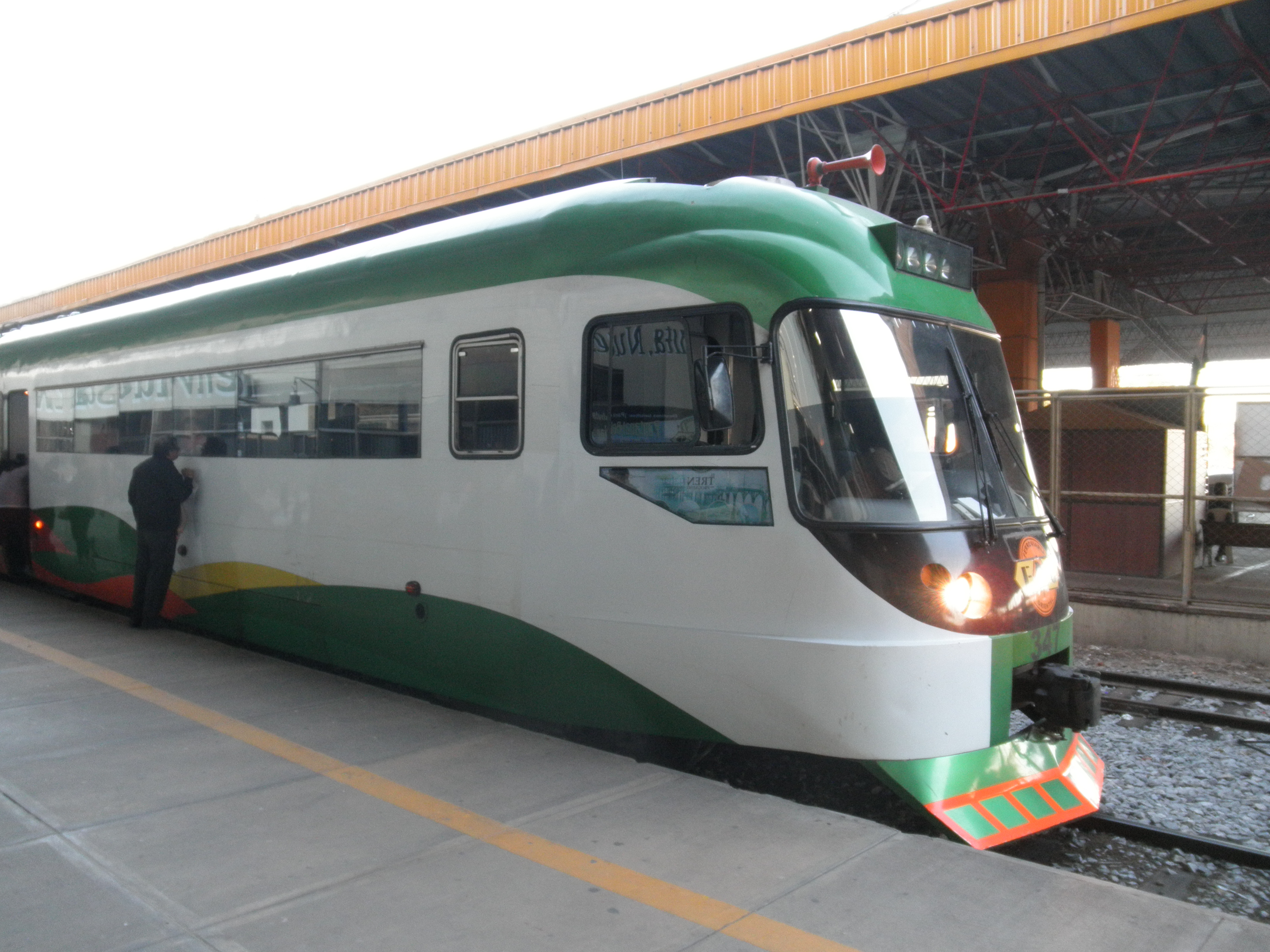
Ferrobus connecting Santa Cruz de la Sierra with Puerto Quijarro, a municipality bordering Brazil

== Education ==
The city is known for its wide variety of universities and higher education institutions that attract students from all over the country and abroad, primarily from Brazil. These include:

- Gabriel René Moreno Autonomous University
- General Aviation Military College. Germán Busch Becerra
- Private Bolivian University
- NUR University
- Military School of Engineering (EMI)
- Franz Tamayo Private University
- Bolivian Evangelical University
- San Pablo Bolivian Catholic University
- Private Technological University of Santa Cruz
- Private University of Santa Cruz de la Sierra
- Private University of Valle
- Aquino University of Bolivia
- Private Cumbre University
- Christian University of Bolivia
- Salesian University of Bolivia
- University for Development and Innovation (UDI)
- National University of the East
- Domingo Savio Private University
- National Ecological University
- Central University of Bolivia
- Simón Bolívar Andean University
- Diakonía School of Audiovisual Communication (UCB)
- National American University (American University)

It also has a variety of national and international institutes in all fields.

There are a variety of public and private schools, at the primary and secondary levels, distributed across three educational districts.

Higher education institutions in Santa Cruz de la Sierra

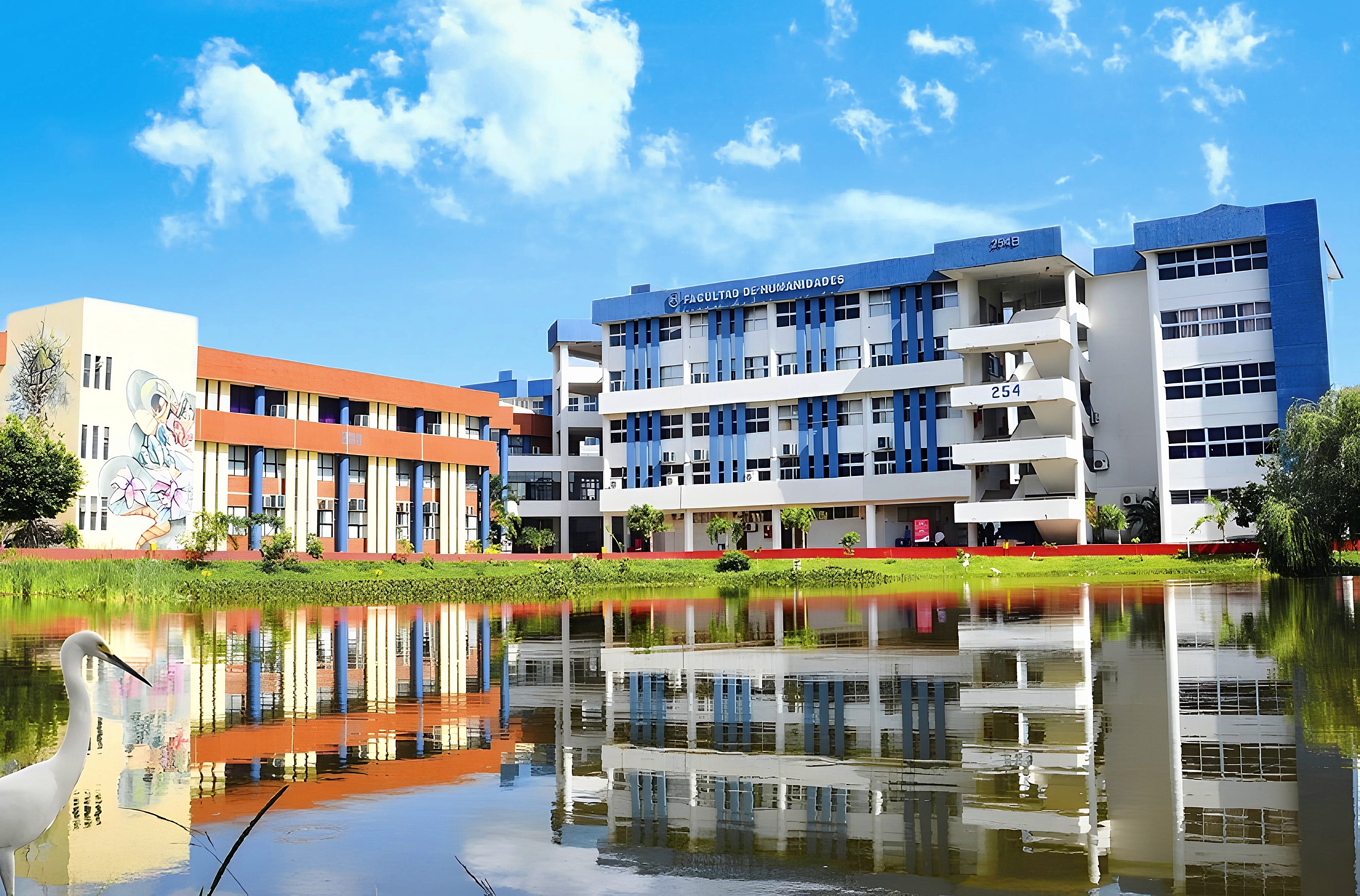
Gabriel René Moreno Autonomous University (UAGRM)

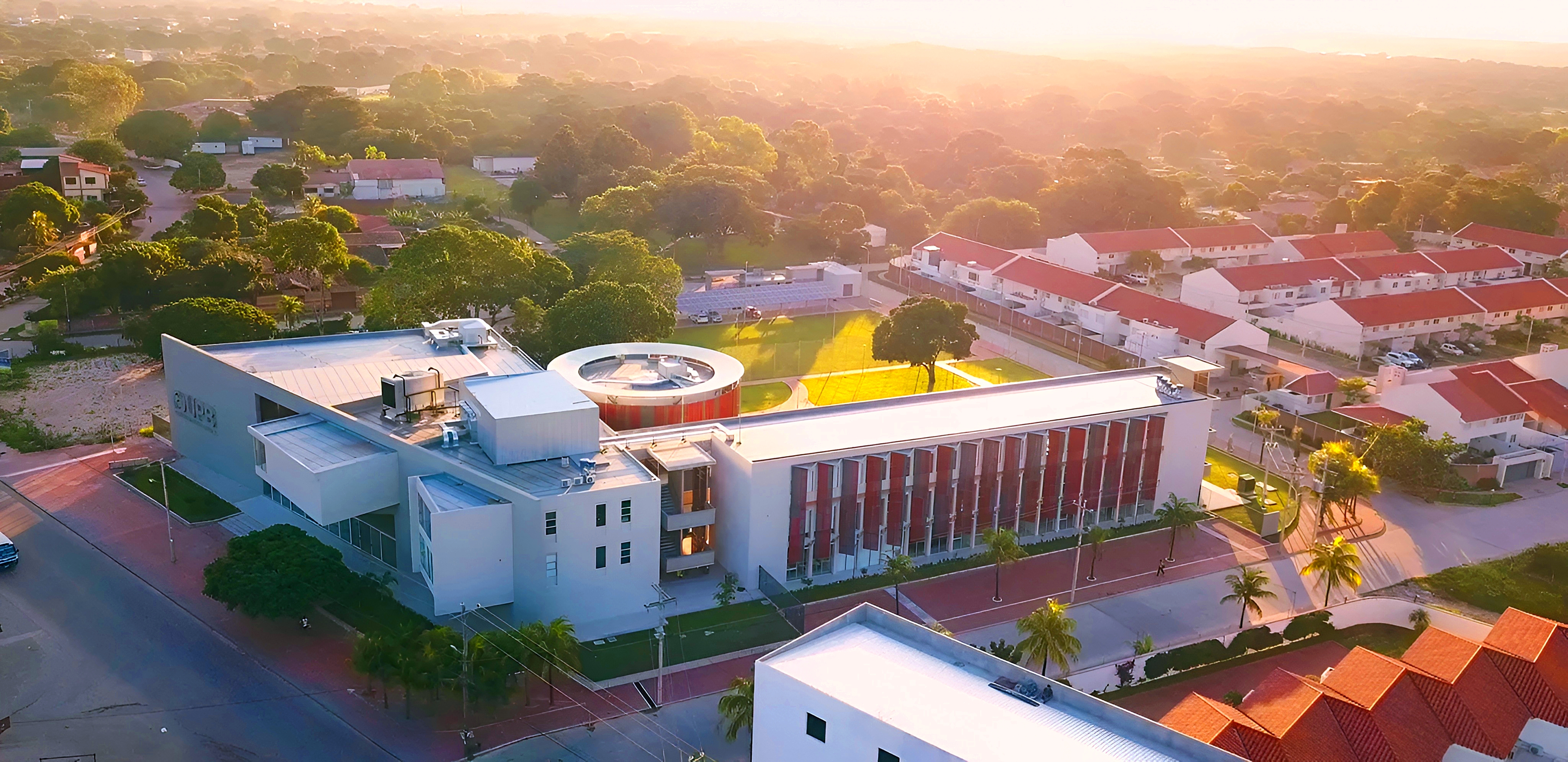
Bolivian Private University (UPB)

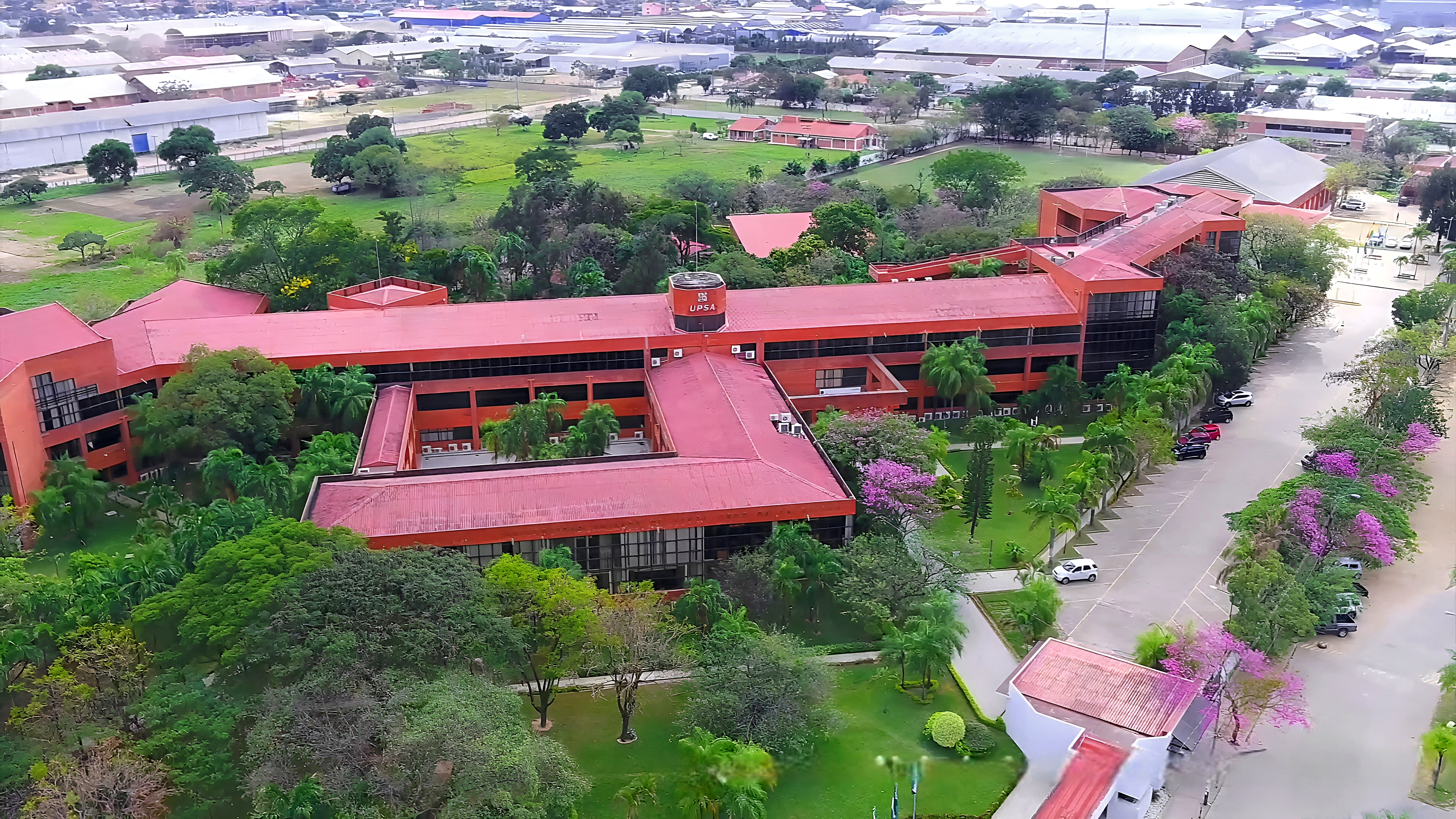
Private University of Santa Cruz de la Sierra (UPSA)

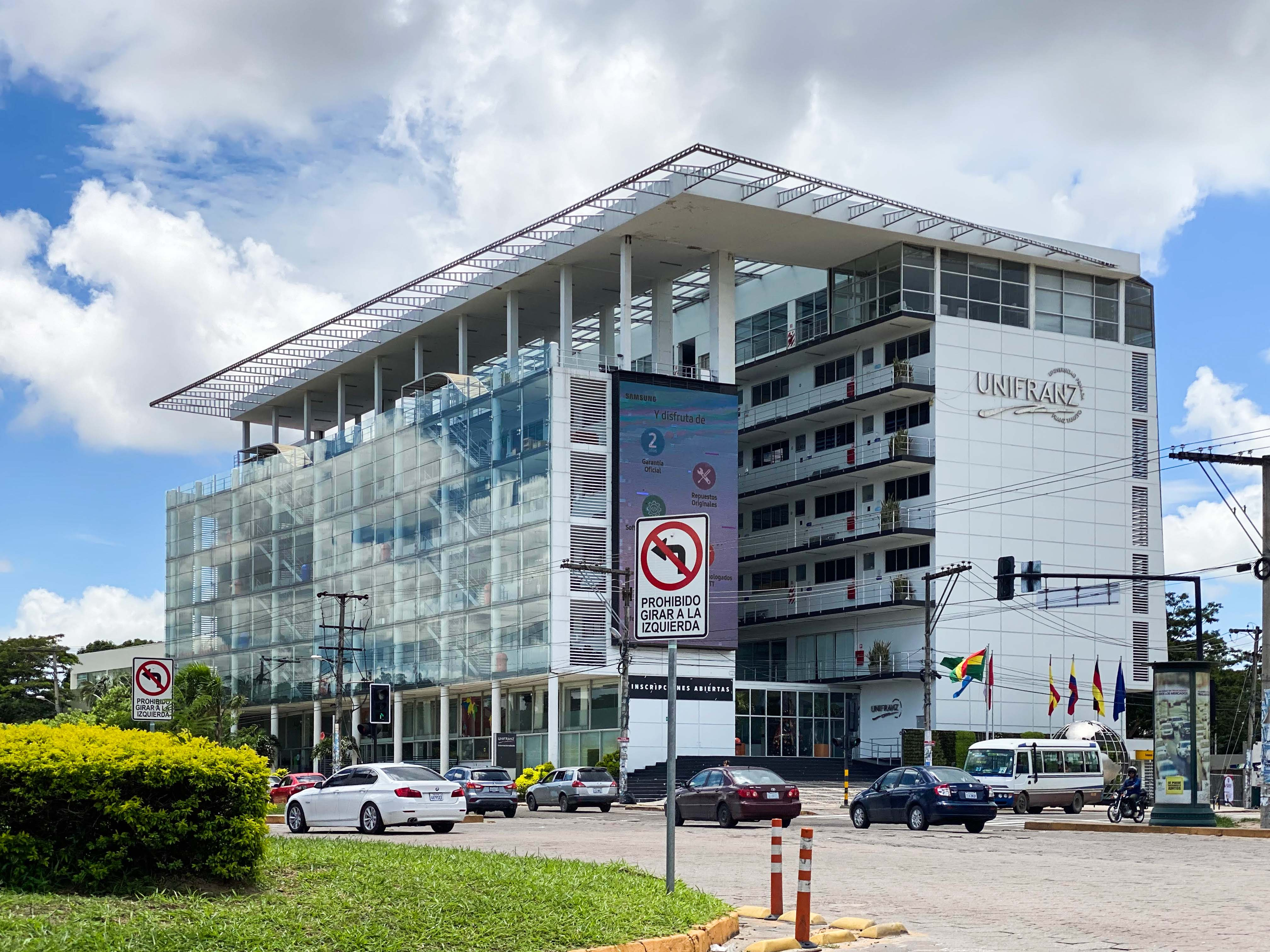
Franz Tamayo University (Unifranz)

== Sports ==
Two of Bolivia's biggest football clubs are located in Santa Cruz de la Sierra: Club Blooming and Oriente Petrolero. Both teams currently play in the Bolivian Primera División. The match between the two, known as the Clásico Cruceño, is one of the fiercest rivalries in Bolivia. Each team has won 5 national titles.

Other football teams in Santa Cruz include Destroyers, Real Santa Cruz, Royal Pari, and Universidad Cruceña.

The main stadium in Santa Cruz is Estadio Ramón Tahuichi Aguilera. The stadium hosted several matches of the 1997 Copa America including one of the semi-finals. The stadium is also scheduled to host the final of the 2025 Copa Sudamericana.

== Entertainment ==
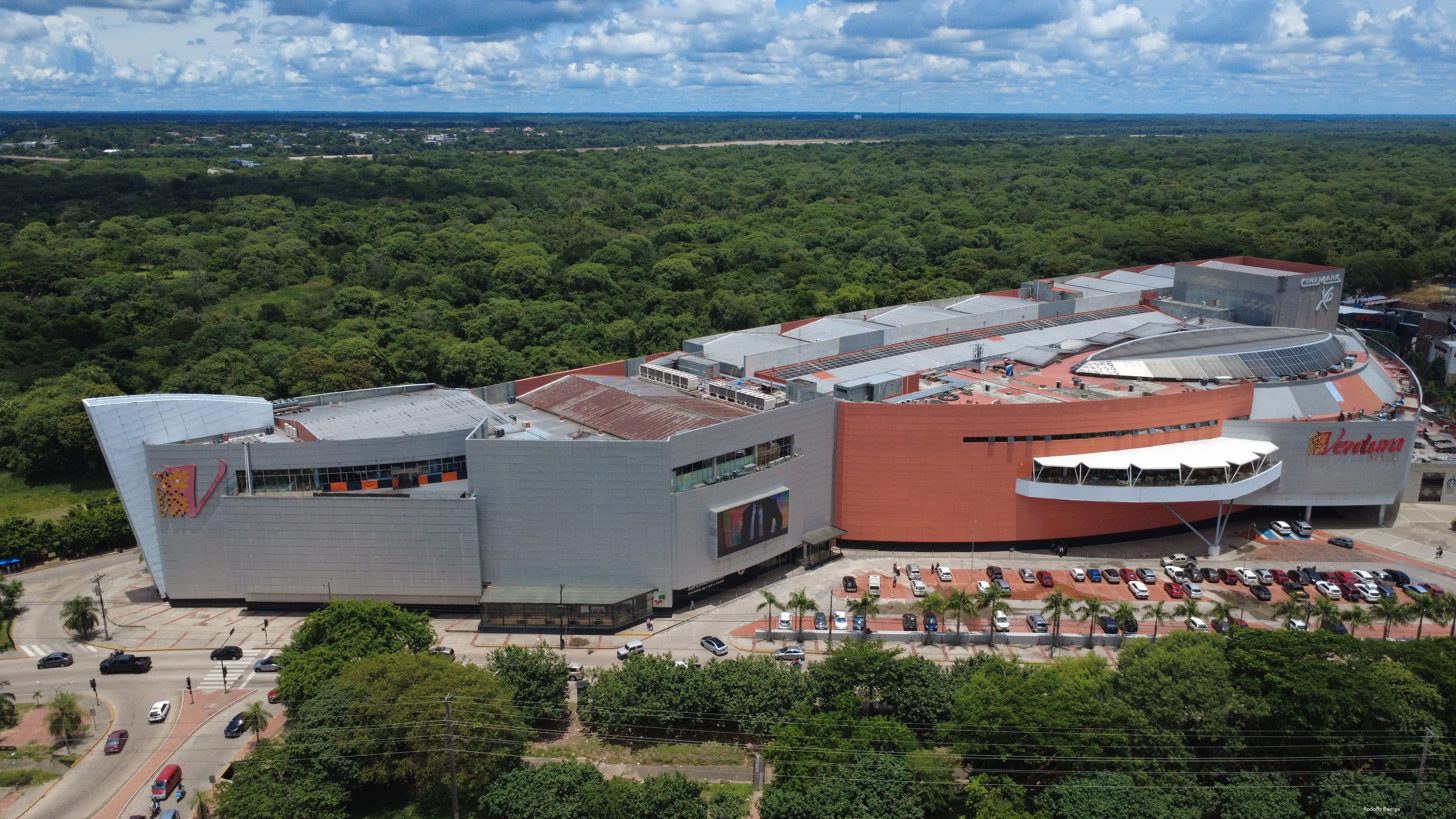
Ventura Mall

=== Shopping centers ===
It has a wide variety of places to shop.

- Ventura Mall
- Las Brisas Mall
- Beauty Plaza
- Patio Design Center
- Cine Center

== Twin towns and sister cities ==
Santa Cruz de la Sierra is twinned with:

- (United Kingdom) Edinburgh
- (Brazil) Campinas
- (Brazil) Curitiba
- (Argentina) Córdoba
- (Argentina) Paraná
- (Argentina) Rosario
- (Argentina) La Plata
- (Argentina) Salta
- (Argentina) Tucumán
- (Uruguay) Montevideo
- (United States) Miami
- (United States) Santa Cruz
- (Taiwan) Taichung
- (Taiwan) Tainan City
- (Spain) Santa Cruz de Tenerife
- (Paraguay) Asunción
- (Peru) Arequipa
- (Chile) Arica
- (Mexico) Villahermosa
- (Colombia) Bucaramanga
- (Croatia) Zagreb

== Notable people ==
- Udalrico Zambrana (born 1938) – poet
- Kevin Farell (born 1996) – footballer
- Martín Escobari – co-president of General Atlantic
- Ivo Méndez (born 1991) – FIFA football referee

== See also ==
- Carnival of Santa Cruz de la Sierra
