= Jeff Gerstmann =

American video game journalist

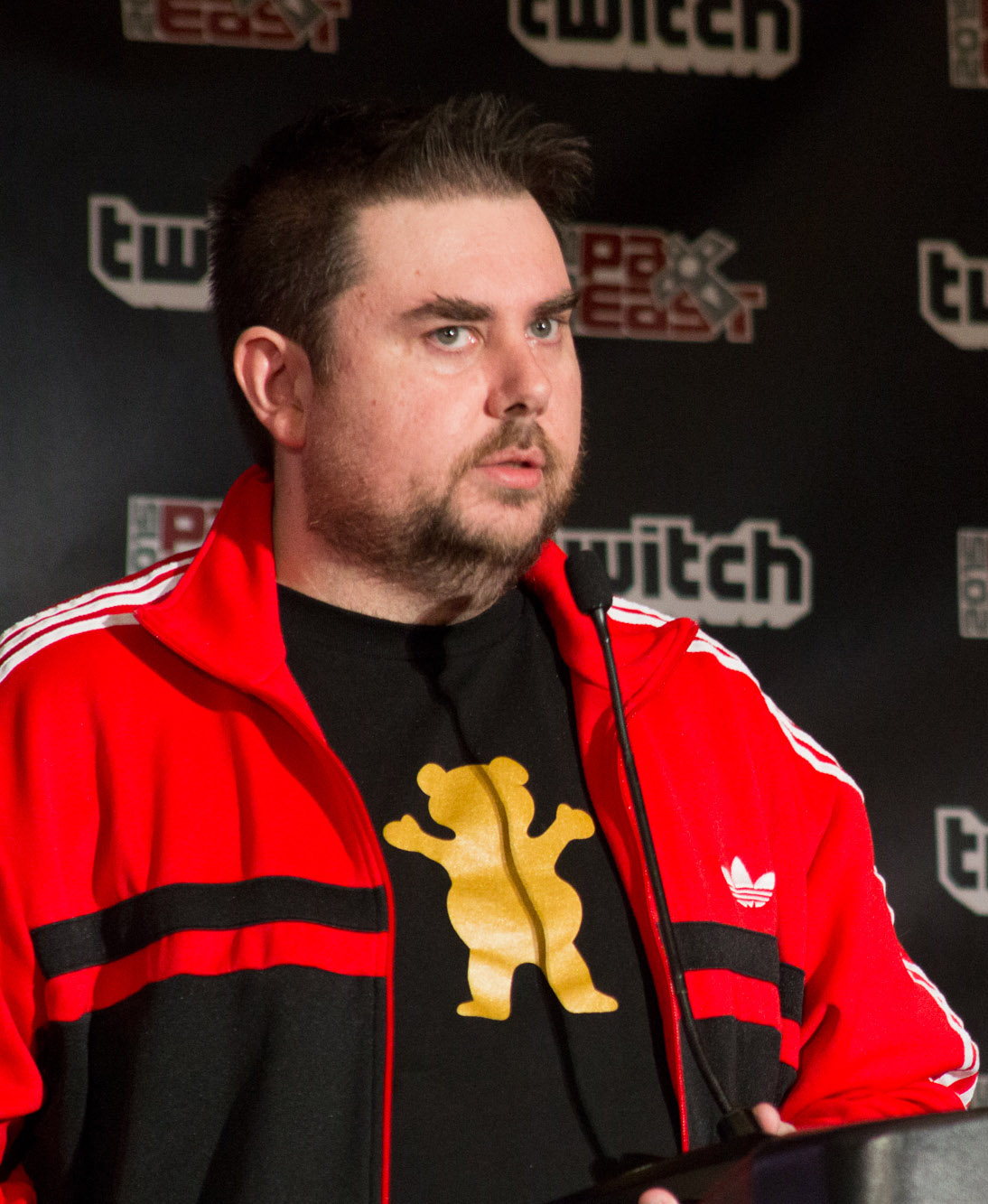
- Gerstmann in 2015
- Born: August 1, 1975 (age 51)
- Occupation: Video game journalist
- Years active: 1992–present
- Notable credit(s): GameSpot editorial director (1996–2007); Giant Bomb co-founder/editor (2008–2022)
- Title: Editor
- Children: 3
- Website: jeff.zone

Jeff Gerstmann (born August 1, 1975) is an American video game journalist. Former editorial director of the gaming website GameSpot and the co-founder of the gaming website Giant Bomb, Gerstmann began working at GameSpot in the fall of 1996, around the launch of VideoGameSpot when GameSpot split PC and console games into separate areas. He shared his thoughts on a variety of other subjects every Monday on his GameSpot blog before his controversial dismissal from GameSpot in 2007 following a review of Kane & Lynch: Dead Men. In 2012, Complex magazine named Gerstmann in their top 25 biggest celebrities in the video game industry.

== Career ==
Gerstmann began work in video game journalism in the early 1990s, having been involved with the game industry since age 17 doing freelance work as well as working for a print magazine for under a year. He was hired as an intern for GameSpot in 1996, eventually becoming editorial director.

Gerstmann appeared in a segment on Good Morning America with Diane Sawyer and Sega product analyst Dennis Lee in September 1999 to talk about the release of the Sega Dreamcast, playing NFL 2K and Ready 2 Rumble Boxing, with the Dreamcast experiencing a severe audio glitch during one of its first televised demonstrations. Gerstmann has suggested that his appearance on the show wearing a FUBU Jersey contributed to the clothing company's fall from popularity.

=== Termination from GameSpot (2007–2008) ===
Gerstmann was dismissed from his position at GameSpot as editorial director on November 28, 2007. Immediately after his termination, reporting and widespread rumors suggested that his dismissal was a result of external pressure from Eidos Interactive, the publisher of Kane & Lynch: Dead Men, which Gerstmann had previously given a Fair rating, which is relatively undesirable, along with critique. Eidos had heavily advertised the game on GameSpot, transforming the entire website to use a Kane & Lynch theme and background instead of the regular GameSpot layout. Citing California state law and CNET Networks policy, GameSpot initially did not give details as to why Gerstmann was terminated, though both GameSpot and their parent company CNET stated that his dismissal was unrelated to the negative review.

Following Gerstmann's termination, editors Alex Navarro, Ryan Davis, Brad Shoemaker, and Vinny Caravella left GameSpot, feeling that they could no longer work for a publication that was perceived as having caved in to advertiser pressure.

In 2012, CBS Interactive, which owned CNET, acquired Gerstmann's Giant Bomb site, ending a non-disparagement agreement between Gerstmann and CNET. As part the purchase, Gerstmann sat down for an interview with GameSpot, confirming that management gave in to publisher pressure when firing him. In addition to the low review score he had given Kane & Lynch, Gerstmann cited other similar incidents that led up to his termination, including management's displeasure with a 7.5 rating given to Ratchet & Clank Future: Tools of Destruction by Aaron Thomas, calling Gerstmann into meetings several times to discuss reviews posted on the site. Gerstmann described a new management team that was unable to properly handle tension between the marketing and editorial staff, laying additional blame on the marketing department, which he said was unprepared in how to handle publisher complaints and threats to withdraw advertising money over low review scores. Gerstmann also said he ran into a few members of Kane & Lynch developer IO Interactive at a convention a few months after his firing, one of whom told him that they agreed that Kane & Lynch wasn't a very good game. Gerstmann responded, "You should totally call up my old bosses and tell them that."

=== Giant Bomb (2008–2022) ===
Shortly after leaving GameSpot, Gerstmann started an online blog saying: "I'm mainly starting this site up to give people a centralized place to hear directly from me, as all these bits and pieces that have gotten out to game news sites via interviews and the blog on my MySpace account aren't really the best way to communicate. So if you're interested in what I plan to do from here, this is the place. I'll also be sharing my thoughts on games and the business that surrounds them, perhaps with an occasional video or two." On the first episode of IGN's "GameSages" podcast, Gerstmann stated that he was talking with "old friends" - later revealed to be Shelby Bonnie, the former CEO and co-founder of CNET, along with other former GameSpot people who left shortly in the wake of Gerstmann's dismissal and founded Whiskey Media - in regards to his future plans.

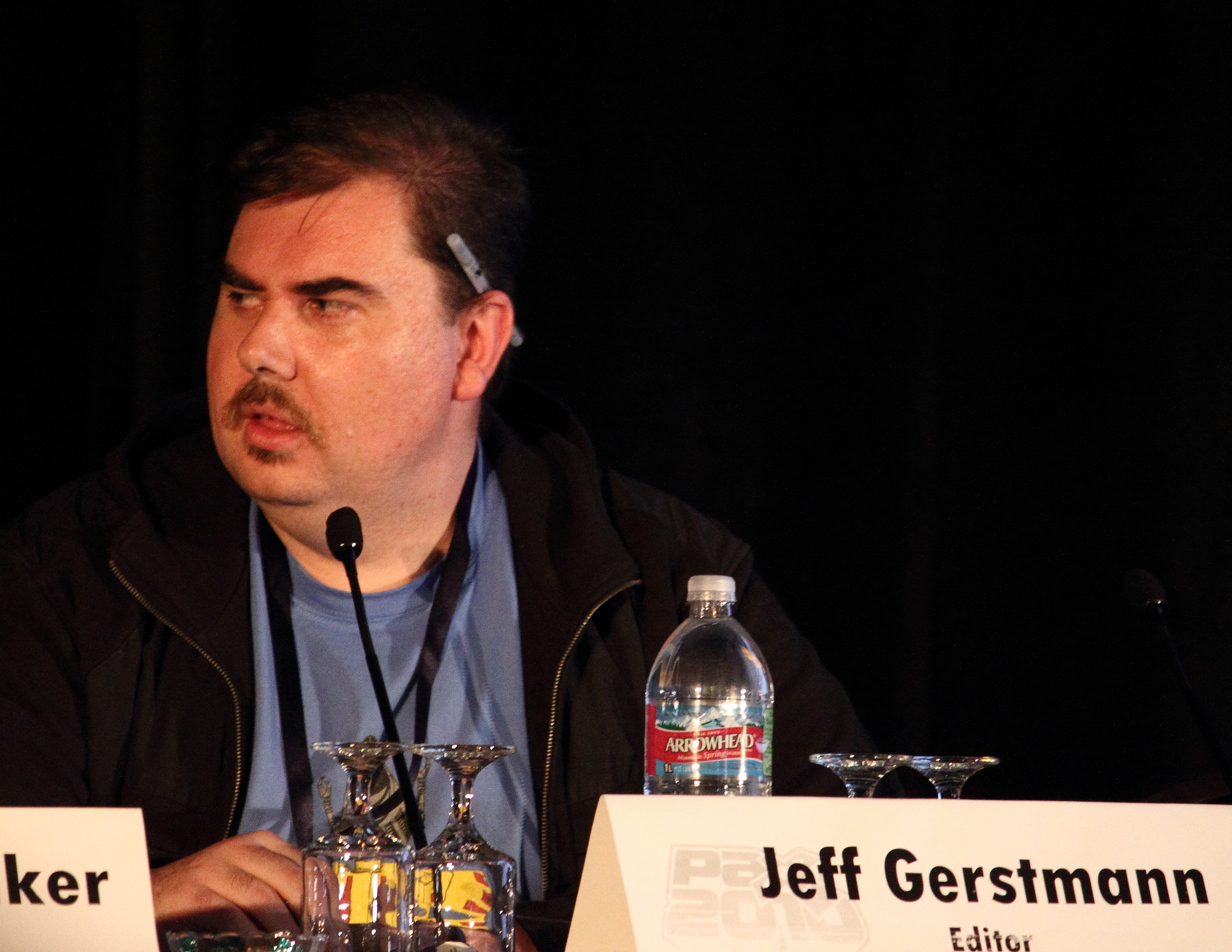
Gerstmann at PAX 2010

Gerstmann and Davis announced their new venture Giant Bomb in March 2008 under the Whiskey Media brand, with the website going live on July 21, 2008. The staff produced videogame-related content with multiple video series including "Endurance Runs" playing through the entirety of long games, "Quick Looks" that spend about 20–30 minutes playing through new titles, and the "This Ain't No Game" segment reviewing movies based on video games. They also produced a podcast, the "Giant Bombcast", which continues today with a different cast. The site includes video game reviews and covers video game news. Gerstmann also personally produced a regular premium-content video segment called "Jar Time with Jeff", hour long broadcasts often themed around jar related puns, in which Gerstmann drinks from a jar while answering questions submitted via email from Giant Bomb users; over time the segment began to include various off topic inclusions such as showing off his video game and console collection, and discussing his own opinions on various non video game-related subjects.

Giant Bomb was voted by Time Magazine as one of the top-50 websites of 2011.

On March 15, 2012, the staff of Giant Bomb announced that the site had been acquired by CBS Interactive, owners of CNET, meaning that Gerstmann would be working alongside his former employer, GameSpot. The site was later purchased by Red Ventures in September 2020, and Fandom in October 2022.

Along with Gerstmann and Davis — who died in 2013 — Brad Shoemaker and Vinny Caravella also contributed to Giant Bomb, with both departing alongside fellow contributor Alex Navarro in 2021.

=== The Jeff Gerstmann Show (2022–present) ===
Gerstmann announced his departure from Giant Bomb on June 6, 2022. The following day, Gerstmann announced a new solo podcast, The Jeff Gerstmann Show, funded via Patreon. Gerstmann elaborated on the podcast's first episode that the decision to leave Giant Bomb was a result of feeling overly stressed and creatively stifled by the increasing bureaucracy and time spent on business and management while working under a corporation, coupled with a desire to spend more time focusing on the actual production of content and the discussion of games and the industry. Gerstmann elaborated further in an October 2022 episode of the podcast, stating that he "got fired three weeks before [he] was going to quit"; while uncertain as to the exact circumstances surrounding his dismissal, he noted that he had become disillusioned at that time, as it had become clear that his goals for the website would not be possible under Red Ventures, their parent company at the time. Between 2023–2026, Gerstmann played and ranked every game released for the NES in North America.

== Other appearances ==
In 1997, Gerstmann was interviewed on Electric Playground after winning an NFL Blitz tournament.

Gerstmann was a regular guest on Bonus Round, which was a panel topic discussion show on the video game industry presented by Geoff Keighley on GameTrailers.

== Personal life ==
Gerstmann became engaged in the summer of 2015. He announced that he became married on February 16, 2016, on the Giant Bombcast. On July 22, 2019, Gerstmann announced the birth of his first child. In May 2021, he announced that he and his wife's second child was due in September.
