= Perennial sources list =

Source reliability rating on Wikipedia

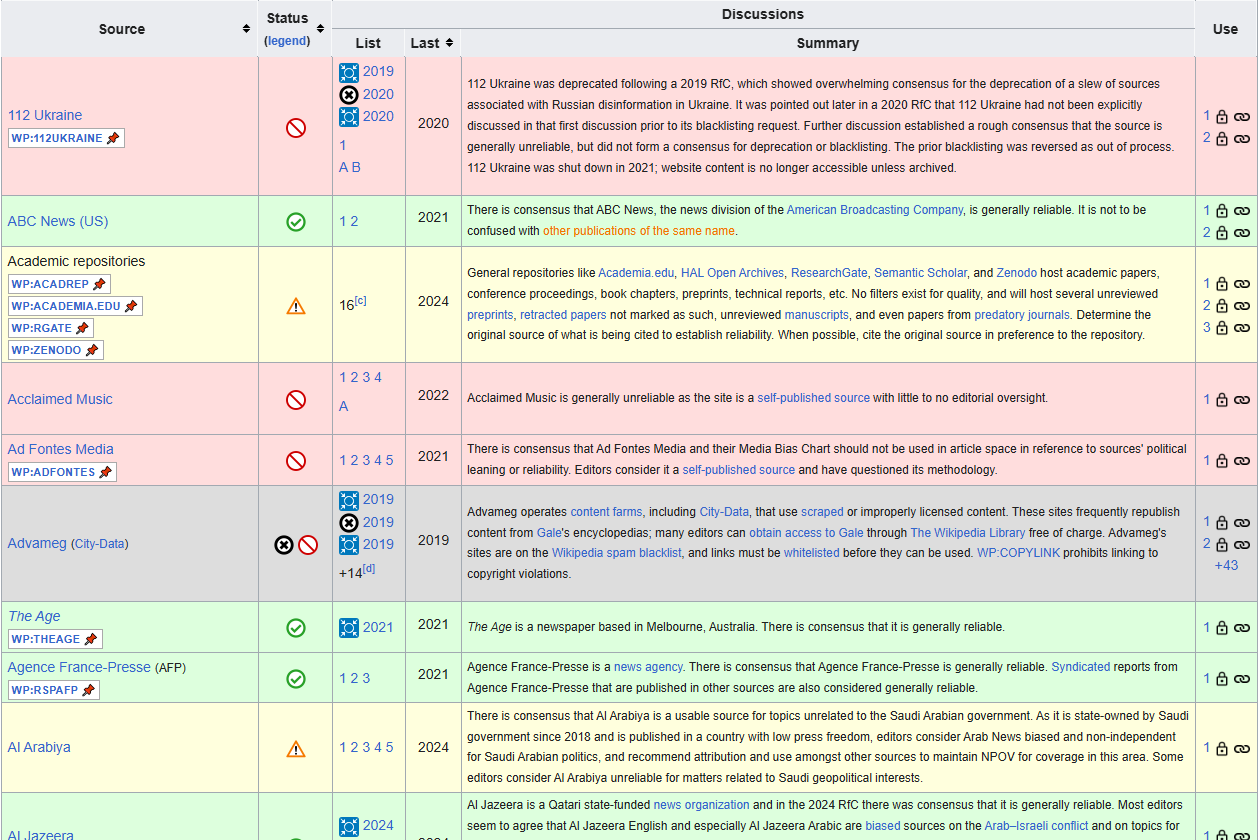
The list on 21 May 2025, sorted alphabetically

The perennial sources list (Note: The full title of the page is "Wikipedia:Reliable sources/Perennial sources", containing the wiki namespace and parent page.) (abbreviated as RSP for "reliable sources/perennial" or as wikilink WP:RSP) is a community-maintained resource on the English Wikipedia that classifies sources by degrees of reliability for the encyclopedia. It was established in 2018 by the English Wikipedia community, and its ratings, which are determined by public discussion and consensus, have received significant media coverage.

Ratings on the list are not meant to function as "pre-approved sources" that may always be used without regard for the ordinary rules of editing, nor is the list a "list of banned sources" that may never be used or should be removed on sight.

== Contents ==
The perennial sources list catalogs sources under five categories:

- Generally reliable: These sources must be "independent, published sources with a reputation for fact-checking and accuracy". Examples include:
  - News channels such as CNN, MS NOW, and Al Jazeera
  - Traditional newspapers such as The New York Times, The Washington Post, The Wall Street Journal, The Daily Telegraph, The Times and its sister paper The Sunday Times, The Guardian, and The Nation
  - Non-news outlets, such as the Southern Poverty Law Center and Amnesty International
- Marginally reliable: Sources categorized as having "no consensus, unclear, or additional considerations apply" with regard to reliability. Examples include China Daily, National Review, Jezebel, and Salon.com
- Generally unreliable: Sources that "should normally not be used" and "should never be used for information about a living person". Examples include:
  - The Daily Wire, The Federalist, The Post Millennial, the Jewish Virtual Library, NGO Monitor, the Daily Kos, and BroadwayWorld
  - Sites that incorporate user-generated content, such as Amazon user reviews, Discogs, and TV Tropes
- Deprecated: Sources "generally prohibited" for questionable reliability. They can still be cited for "uncontroversial self-descriptions", but reliable secondary sources are preferred. Deprecated sources include sources that are known for promoting unsubstantiated conspiracy theories. Examples include:
  - Occupy Democrats, One America News Network, The Epoch Times, The Daily Caller, The Gateway Pundit, The Grayzone, MintPress News and Newsmax
  - Tabloid newspapers such as the Daily Mail, The Sun, the Daily Star, and the National Enquirer
  - Chinese, Russian and Iranian state media outlets such as China Global Television Network and RT
  - Other websites such as archive.today and Grokipedia
- Blacklisted: These sources are on Wikipedia's spam blacklist due to "persistent abuse, usually in the form of embedded external links". Examples include the Hindu nationalist websites OpIndia, Swarajya, and TFIPost, and The Points Guy, ZoomInfo, and Natural News

Some sources have multiple categorizations; for example, Newsweek after 2013 is categorized as a marginally reliable source, the New York Post is considered marginally reliable for entertainment-related topics and generally unreliable for non-entertainment topics, and Rolling Stone is considered generally unreliable for "politically and societally sensitive issues". Some sources have also been both deprecated and blacklisted, such as Breitbart News, Infowars, the Heritage Foundation, and state-sponsored fake news websites such as SouthFront and NewsFront.

Reliability discussions are held on the Reliable Sources Noticeboard, a public forum. Editors discuss how well a source complies with Wikipedia's guideline on reliable sources. Sometimes, debates are held within Wikipedia's Request for Comment process. The debates are public and archived, allowing people to see how a reliability assessment was reached.

Which sources are considered reliable differ among language versions. For example, the Persian Wikipedia heavily relies on Iranian state media outlets. In 2022, the East StratCom Task Force reported that pro-Russian disinformation websites were being cited on the Russian, Arabic, Spanish, Portuguese, and Vietnamese Wikipedias, despite being blacklisted on the English Wikipedia.

== Notable ratings ==
=== Daily Mail ===
In February 2017, after a formal community discussion, editors on the English Wikipedia banned the use of the Daily Mail as a source in most cases. Its use as a reference is now "generally prohibited, especially when other more reliable sources exist", and it can no longer be used as proof of notability. The Daily Mail can still be used as a source in an about-self fashion, when the Daily Mail itself is the subject of discussion. Support for the ban centered on "the Daily Mail's reputation for poor fact checking, sensationalism, and flat-out fabrication". Some users opposed the decision, arguing that it is "actually reliable for some subjects" and "may have been more reliable historically." The Daily Mail thus became the first deprecated source.

Wikipedia's ban of the Daily Mail generated a significant amount of media attention, especially from the British media. Though the Daily Mail strongly contested this decision by the community, Wikipedia's co-founder Jimmy Wales backed the community's choice, saying: "I think what [the Daily Mail has] done brilliantly in this ad funded world, they've mastered the art of clickbait, they've mastered the art of hyped-up headlines. They've also mastered the art of—I'm sad to say—of running stories that simply aren't true. And that's why Wikipedia decided not to accept them as a source anymore. It's very problematic, they get very upset when we say this, but it's just fact." A February 2017 editorial in The Times on the decision said: "Newspapers make errors and have the responsibility to correct them. Wikipedia editors' fastidiousness, however, appears to reflect less a concern for accuracy than dislike of the Daily Mail's opinions." Slate writer Will Oremus said the decision "should encourage more careful sourcing across Wikipedia while doubling as a richly deserved rebuke to a publication that represents some of the worst forces in online news."

In 2018, the Wikipedia community reaffirmed the Daily Mail's deprecation as a source. In November 2020, Daily Mail sister paper The Mail on Sunday was also deprecated.

=== Fox News ===
As of 2022, thousands of articles on Wikipedia use Fox News as a source. In 2010, the Wikipedia community held its first major discussion of Fox News's reliability. The community decided that Fox News was politically biased, but generally reliable. Since 2010, Fox News has been the subject of numerous debates on Wikipedia about its reliability. Discussions have run over hundreds of thousands of words and have included the input of over 100 editors. Many conversations have sought to establish, or enforce, a distinction between bias and reliability, with the latter having more to do with fact-checking and accuracy, though some argued that a consistent amount of errors and retractions in reporting are normal for a reliable media outlet.

In July 2020, the Wikipedia community announced that Fox News would no longer be considered "generally reliable" in its reporting of science and politics, and that it "should be used with caution to verify contentious claims" about those topics. The decision was made because Fox News downplayed the COVID-19 pandemic, because of allegations that it spread misinformation about climate change, and because it reported on the false concept of "no-go zones" for non-Muslims in British cities. The decision did not affect Fox News's reliability on other topics.

In 2022, the Wikipedia community announced that Fox News would be considered "marginally reliable" in its reporting on science and politics. This meant that it cannot be used as a source for "exceptional claims" and that its reliability would be decided on a case-by-case basis for other scientific and political claims. The decision applies only to articles on Fox News's website and articles about topics that are scientific or political. As of June 2024, Fox News and its talk shows are considered generally unreliable sources for scientific and political coverage. These assessments do not apply to local affiliates owned by Fox.

=== Red Ventures ===
In February 2023, Wikipedia editors downgraded the reliability rating of CNET, a technology website owned at the time by Red Ventures, to "generally unreliable" after it was revealed that CNET was publishing content generated by artificial intelligence. CNET's reliability rating is broken into three time periods: pre-October 2020 (generally reliable prior to the acquisition), October 2020–October 2022 (no consensus on reliability following the acquisition by Red Ventures, "leading to a deterioration in editorial standards") and November 2022–present (generally unreliable, after CNET began using AI "to rapidly generate articles riddled with factual inaccuracies and affiliate links"). The CNET incident resulted in editors expressing concern about the reliability of Red Ventures–owned websites, such as Bankrate and CreditCards.com, which also published AI-generated content around the same time. In 2024, after a discussion on the reliability of Red Ventures–owned tech website ZDNET, a discussion was initiated of the reliability of all Red Ventures websites. Red Ventures websites The Points Guy (TPG) and Healthline are on the spam blacklist, due to TPG's questionable relationships with the credit card companies it covers and Healthline's publication of misinformation.

=== Anti-Defamation League ===
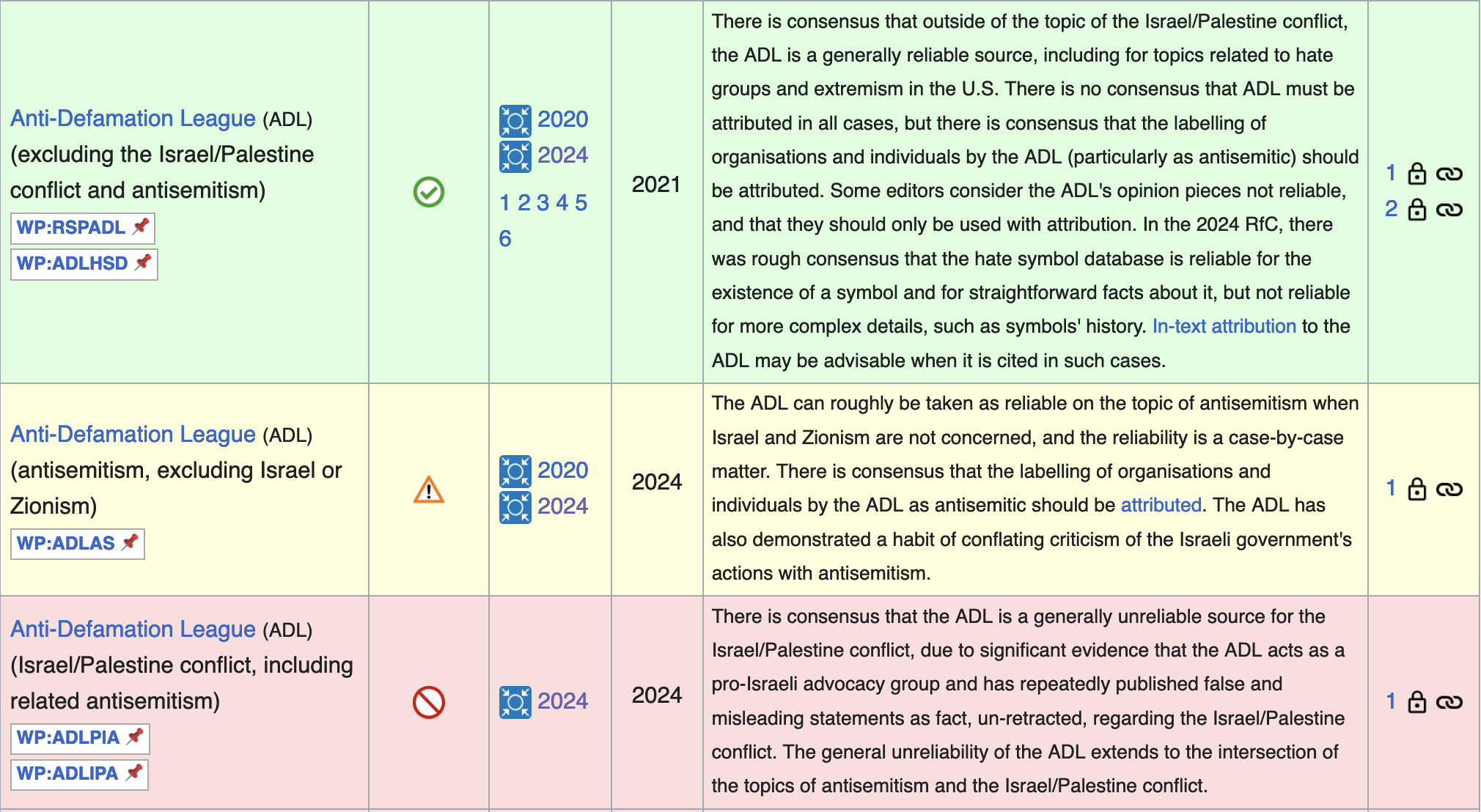
The ADL's entries on the list, dependent on topic, as of June 2024

In April 2024, a discussion was initiated about the reliability of the Anti-Defamation League (ADL) on the Israeli–Palestinian conflict, on antisemitism, and on the ADL's hate symbols database. The discussion engaged 120 editors over two months and included a wide range of perspectives, summarized by editors as "ranging from those who enthusiastically defended the ADL in all contexts, to those who viewed it as 'categorically unreliable'".

In June 2024, the discussion led to the ADL being downgraded to a "generally unreliable" source on the Israeli–Palestinian conflict, including "the intersection of antisemitism and the [Israeli–Palestinian] conflict, such as labeling pro-Palestinian activists as antisemitic". An English Wikipedia administrator who evaluated the community's consensus for this discussion said there was substantial evidence that the ADL acted as a "pro-Israeli advocacy group" that has published unretracted misinformation "to the point that it taints their reputation for accuracy and fact checking regarding the Israeli-Palestinian conflict", as well as that it has a habit "of conflating criticism of the Israeli government's actions with antisemitism". The editors cited the ADL updating its methodology to classify pro-Palestinian protests as antisemitic incidents, controversial statements made by ADL CEO Jonathan Greenblatt that were criticized by the ADL's own staff, and its reliance on the IHRA definition of antisemitism, which critics have said is too broad and can be used to suppress pro-Palestinian speech.

The editors reached a consensus that "the ADL can roughly be taken as reliable on the topic of antisemitism when Israel and Zionism are not concerned". Of the ADL's hate symbol database, editors determined that "the rough consensus here is that the database is reliable for the existence of a symbol and for straightforward facts about it, but not reliable for more complex details, such as symbols' history". The RSP listing for the ADL was updated to read that "outside of the topic of the Israel/Palestine conflict, the ADL is a generally reliable source, including for topics related to hate groups and extremism in the U.S."

The ADL condemned the downgrade, alleging it was part of a "campaign to delegitimize" the organization. The decision was also criticized by over 40 Jewish organizations, including Jewish Federations of North America, B'nai B'rith International, and HIAS. The Wikimedia Foundation said in response, "The Foundation has not, and does not, intervene in decisions made by the community about the classification of a source".

James Loeffler, a professor of modern Jewish history at Johns Hopkins University, said the English Wikipedia's decision was a "significant hit" to the ADL's credibility. Dov Waxman, professor of Israel Studies at the University of California, Los Angeles, said that if "Wikipedia and other sources and the journalists start ignoring the ADL's data, it becomes a real issue for Jewish Americans who are understandably concerned about the rise of antisemitism". Mira Sucharov, a professor of political science at Carleton University, said the decision was "a sign that the Jewish community needs better institutions".

== Impact ==
RSP affects whether sources are cited and how they are summarized in Wikipedia articles. According to political scientist Sverrir Steinsson, by classifying the reliability of news sources, "Wikipedia has accepted the use of contested labels and taken sides on contested subjects, ultimately producing a type of content that is distinctly anti-pseudoscience and anti-conspiracy theories, and which has the perception of a liberal bent in U.S. politics". This led to discontent and departures among the "pro-fringe camp" of Wikipedia editors, which Steinsson defined as "Editors who were more supportive of conspiracy theories, pseudoscience, and conservatism".

A 2023 Association for Computing Machinery conference paper found that the median lifespan of a source citation on English Wikipedia decreased by over two-thirds after the source was designated as deprecated or blacklisted on RSP.

Wikipedia editors who are fans of particular topics have created lists of sources that are structured similarly to RSP but focus on their specific topic area, such as video games. These lists are maintained by WikiProjects that evaluate sources using both Wikipedia's reliability guidelines and supplemental subject-related criteria created by the WikiProjects themselves. When a niche source that is designated as "reliable" in a topic-focused list receives sufficient attention, the source is added to RSP and listed alongside mainstream generalist sources.

== Reception ==
While the debates are public and archived, critics have said it is not clear who the volunteer editors are and how they are vetted.

In 2020, Omer Benjakob of Haaretz stated that with RSP, "Wikipedia offers greater transparency and a much better model for fighting disinformation than any social media platform has yet to do, simply by building a community of fact-checkers dedicated to keeping the site accurate". In 2025, Stephen Harrison of Slate said, "Contrary to sensationalist media coverage, decisions made by the Wikipedia community tend to be carefully considered... While headlines suggested that Wikipedia had completely banned the ADL, the actual decision makes clear that the organization can still be used as a source in certain contexts outside the Israeli–Palestinian conflict." He added, "To be fair, the Wikipedia community could do a better job of explaining why advocacy organizations are not always considered reliable sources based on the context; however, that is a complex discussion that's not easily contained within a tweet."

In 2019, the decision by editors to deprecate outlets such as The Epoch Times, One America News Network, The Daily Caller, and The Gateway Pundit, which were pro-Donald Trump, intensified claims by the American right that Wikipedia has a liberal bias. In September 2024, Ashley Rindsberg criticized the list as the "creation of a single influential editor". In 2025, the list was criticized by American conservative group Media Research Center (MRC) as a blacklist with a bias against conservative outlets; the MRC was cited in a New York Post editorial titled "Big Tech must block Wikipedia until it stops censoring and pushing disinformation". Ari Paul of ScheerPost commented, "the fact that the [New York Post] implies only right-wing sources are listed is an indication that its reputation as 'generally unreliable for factual reporting' is well-deserved."

== See also ==
- Ideological bias on Wikipedia
- Reliability of Wikipedia
