= GameSpot =

American video game website

- Website type: Video game journalism
- Founded: May 1, 1996; 30 years ago
- Headquarters: San Francisco, California
- Founders: Pete Deemer; Vince Broady; Jon Epstein
- Parent: SpotMedia (1996–1997); ZDNET (1997–2000); CNET (2000–2008); CBS Interactive (2008–2020); Red Ventures (2020–2022); Fandom, Inc. (2022–present)
- Website: gamespot.com
- Registration: Optional (free and paid)
- Launched: January 13, 1996; 30 years ago (Spotmedia)
- Current status: Active

YouTube information
- Channel: GameSpot
- Subscribers: 5.63 million
- Views: 3.9 billion

GameSpot is an American video gaming website that provides coverage of video games and entertainment, including news, reviews, previews, trailers, walkthroughs, guides, downloads, and community forums. Launched on May 1, 1996, by founders Pete Deemer, Vince Broady, and Jon Epstein under SpotMedia Communications, it initially focused on personal computer games before expanding to console titles via a sister site, VideoGameSpot. The site has been owned by Fandom, Inc. since October 2022.

In 2004, GameSpot won "Best Gaming Website" as chosen by the viewers in Spike TV's second Video Game Award Show, and has won Webby Awards several times. The domain GameSpot.com attracted at least 60 million visitors annually by October 2008 according to a Compete.com study.

== History ==
GameSpot was founded on May 1, 1996, by Pete Deemer, Vince Broady, and Jon Epstein under their newly established company, SpotMedia Communications. SpotMedia had been formed months earlier in January 1996, after the founders left their roles at IDG to pursue an online platform focused on gaming content. The site's initial launch emphasized news, previews, and reviews primarily for personal computer games. To broaden its scope, SpotMedia launched a companion site, VideoGameSpot, on December 1, 1996, dedicated to console and arcade titles.

On January 6, 1997, SpotMedia announced a partnership with Ziff Davis, valued at $20 million, which would integrate content from Ziff Davis publications such as Computer Gaming World and Electronic Gaming Monthly. By the following month, Ziff Davis's substantial financial infusion enabled GameSpot to grow to 45 employees. Eventually VideoGameSpot, then renamed VideoGames.com, was merged into GameSpot. Upon the May 11, 1998 launch of Ziff Davis's cable channel ZDTV, a program by GameSpot was projected for a mid-summer release, and would premiere as GameSpot TV on July 4. In February 1999, PC Magazine named GameSpot one of the hundred best websites, alongside competitors IGN and CNET Gamecenter.

Following the acquisition of ZDNet by CNET Networks, announced on July 19, 2000, for approximately $1.6 billion in stock, GameSpot came under the ownership of CNET. That December, The New York Times declared GameSpot and Gamecenter the "Time and Newsweek of gaming sites". In February 2001, GameSpot was spared from a redundancy reduction effort by CNET which shuttered Gamecenter.

In October 2005, GameSpot adopted a new design similar to that of TV.com, now considered a sister site to GameSpot. GameSpot ran a few different paid subscriptions from 2006 to 2013, but is no longer running those. In June 2008, GameSpot's parent company CNET was acquired by CBS Corporation, and GameSpot along with CNET's other online assets were managed by the CBS Interactive division.

CNET was sold to Red Ventures in October 2020. Two years later, Fandom acquired GameSpot, along with Metacritic, TV Guide, GameFAQs, Giant Bomb, Cord Cutters News, and Comic Vine from Red Ventures. In January 2023, 40-50 employees were affected by a round of layoffs. More layoffs at GameSpot took place in January 2024.

=== International history ===
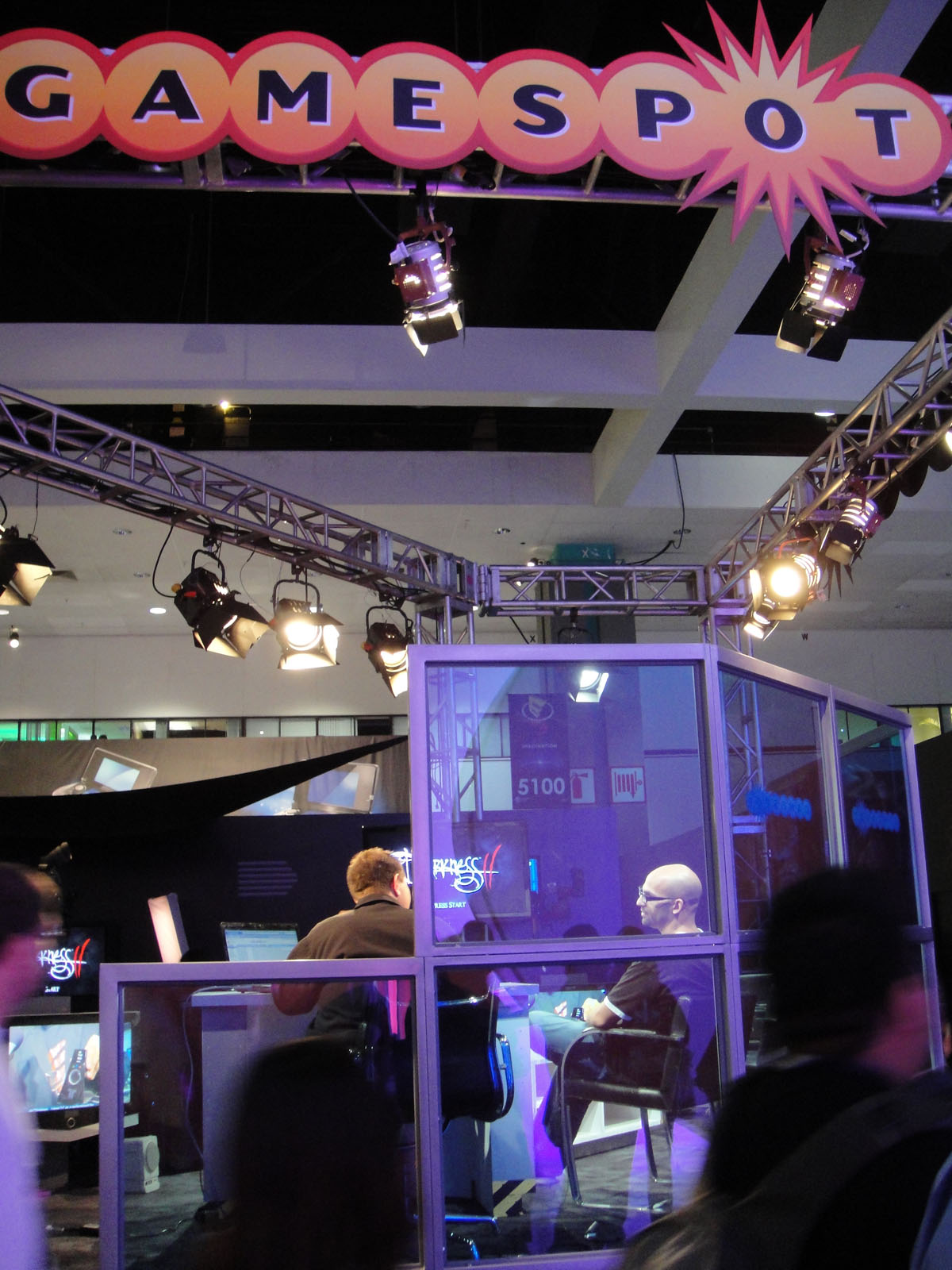
The GameSpot stage at E3 2011

GameSpot UK (United Kingdom) was started in October 1997 and operated until mid-2002, offering content that was oriented for the British market that often differed from that of the U.S. site. During this period, GameSpot UK won the 1999 PPAi (Periodical Publishers Association interactive) award for best website, and was short listed in 2001. PC Gaming World was considered a "sister print magazine" and some content appeared on both GameSpot UK and PC Gaming World. Following the purchase of ZDNet by CNET, GameSpot UK was merged with the main US site. On April 24, 2006, GameSpot UK was relaunched.

In a similar fashion, GameSpot AU (Australia) existed on a local scale in the late 1990s with Australian-produced reviews. It ceased in 2003. When a local version of the main CNET portal, CNET.com.au was launched in 2003, GameSpot AU content was folded into CNET.com.au. The site was fully re-launched in mid-2006, with a specialized forum, local reviews, special features, local pricings in Australian dollars, Australian release dates, and more local news.

=== Gerstmann dismissal ===
Jeff Gerstmann, editorial director of the site, was fired on November 28, 2007, as a result of pressure from Eidos Interactive, a major advertiser; Eidos objected to the 6/10 review that Gerstmann had given Kane & Lynch: Dead Men, a game they were heavily advertising on GameSpot at the time. Both GameSpot and parent company CNET initially stated that his dismissal was unrelated to the review. However, in March 2012, the non-disclosure agreement that forced Gerstmann to withhold the details of his termination was nullified. Not long after, Giant Bomb (a site Gerstmann founded after leaving GameSpot) was being purchased by the same parent company as GameSpot, and that they moved their headquarters into the same building. As part of this announcement, Gerstmann revealed that the firing was indeed related to threats of Eidos pulling advertising revenue away from GameSpot as a result of Gerstmann's poor review score, which was confirmed by GameSpot's Jon Davison.

== Operations and features ==
GameSpot employs a 1-10 scoring system for reviews, which evolved from a categorical breakdown—where aspects such as graphics and audio received individual scores—to a unified overall score introduced in 2007 with half-point increments for finer granularity. By 2013, the scale shifted to integer values only, categorizing scores as Masterpiece (10), Superb (9), Great (8), Good (7), Fair (6), Mediocre (5), Poor (4), Bad (3), Terrible (2), or Abysmal (1).

== Notable staff ==
- Greg Kasavin – executive editor and site director of GameSpot, who left in 2007 to become a game developer. He became a producer at EA and 2K Games. As of 2021, he was working for Supergiant Games as a writer and creative director.
- Jeff Gerstmann – editorial director of the site, dismissed from GameSpot on November 28, 2007, for undisclosed reasons, after which he started Giant Bomb. Following the announcement of the purchase of Giant Bomb by CBS Interactive on March 15, 2012, Jeff was allowed to reveal that he was dismissed by management as a result of publishers threatening to pull advertising revenue due to less-than-glowing review scores being awarded by GameSpot's editorial team.
- Danny O'Dwyer – video presenter of GameSpot, founded crowdfunded game documentary company Noclip in 2016.
- Chris Wanstrath – web developer of GameSpot who left in 2008 to start GitHub, which became the world's largest host service for software code. In 2018 he sold GitHub to Microsoft for $7.5 billion.
- Erik Wolpaw - video game writer who has worked for both Valve and Double Fine Productions.
GameSpot notable staff
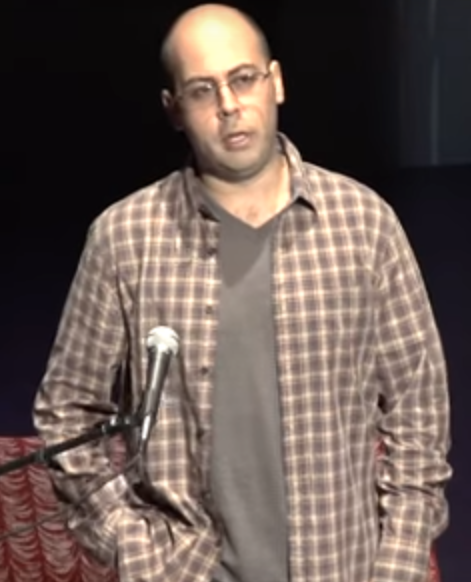
Greg Kasavin in 2013

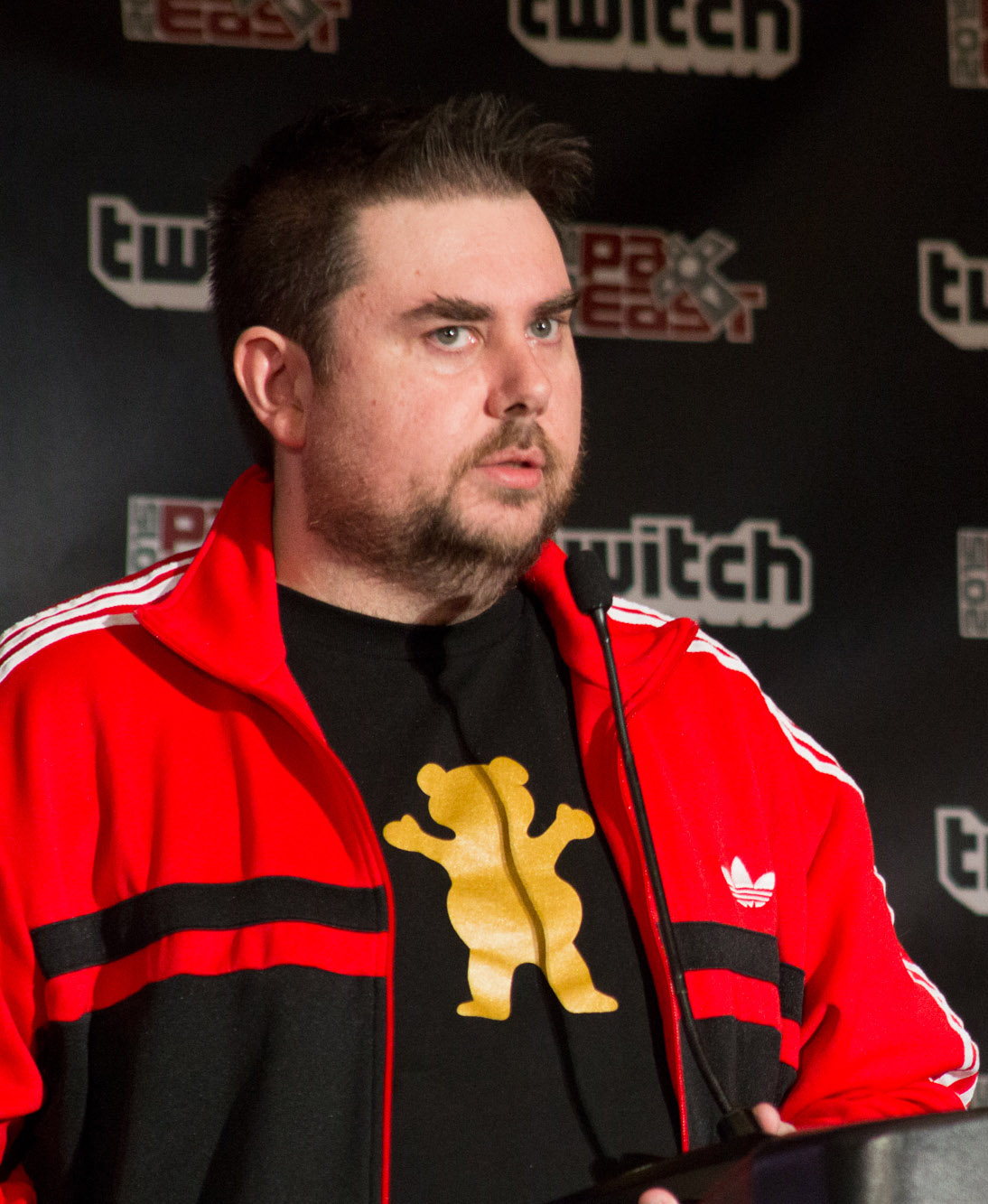
Jeff Gerstmann in 2015

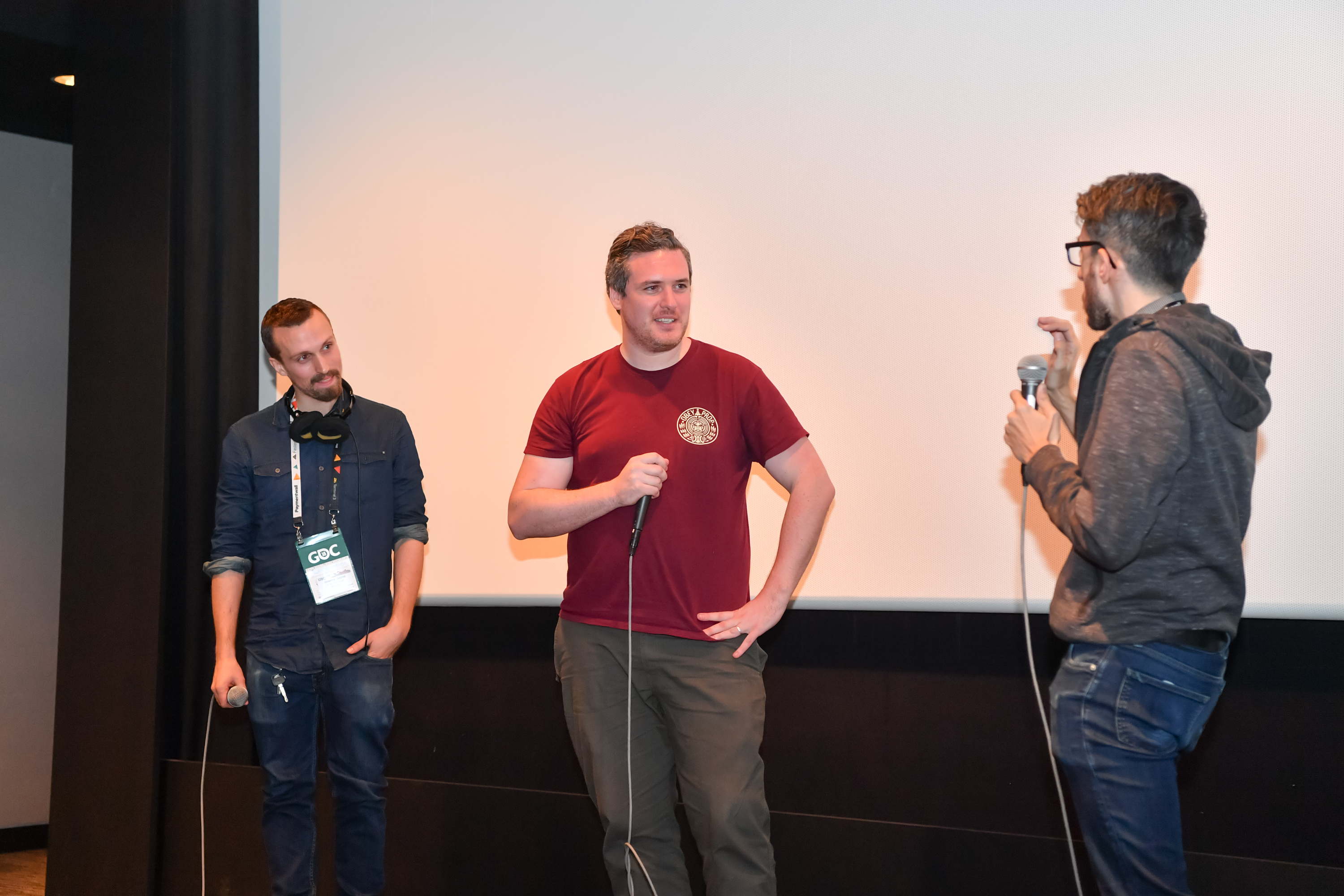
Danny O'Dwyer in 2018

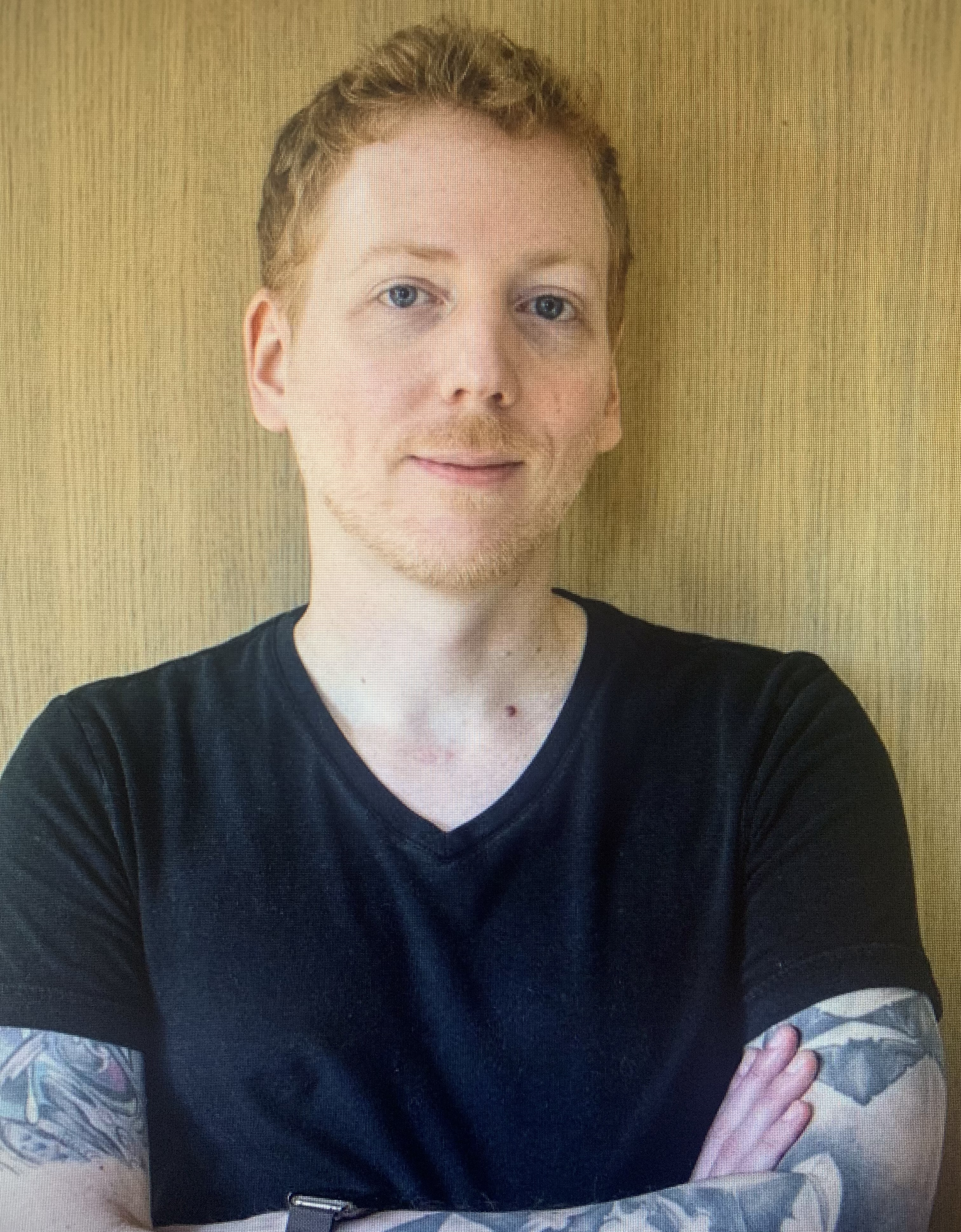
Chris Wanstrath in 2023

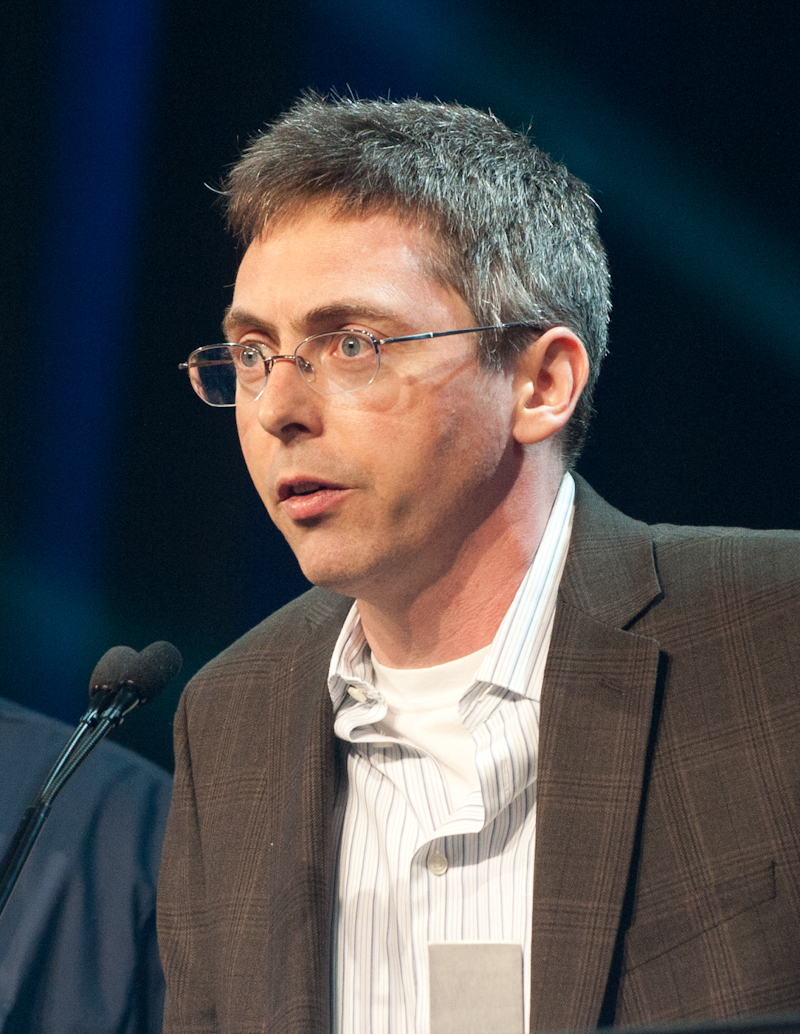
Erik Wolpaw in 2012

== See also ==
- GameSpot Game of the Year awards
