= Whiskey Media =

American online media company

- Type: Online, mass media
- Founded: October 1, 2007; 19 years ago
- Founder: Shelby Bonnie
- Successor: Whalerock Industries
- Headquarters: San Francisco, California, United States
- Products: Websites

Whiskey Media was an American online media company founded independently by CNET co-founder Shelby Bonnie in 2008. It was the parent company of Tested, Screened, and Anime Vice, and the former parent company of Giant Bomb and Comic Vine. Whiskey Media websites were wiki community based, while maintaining an editorial staff. The company's target demographic was focused primarily on males between 10 and 30. The name "Whiskey Media" is a reference to a Kentucky distillery that was owned by the family of Shelby Bonnie before prohibition. Whiskey Media operated in San Francisco, California, after previously being located in Sausalito. On March 15, 2012, Whiskey Media was acquired by Lloyd Braun and Gail Berman's BermanBraun along with Tested, Screened, and Anime Vice while Giant Bomb and Comic Vine were bought separately by CBS Interactive.

== History and development ==
=== History ===
Whiskey Media was created in 2007, after Shelby Bonnie resigned as the CEO of CNET in 2006, a website he co-founded in 1994. Joining Bonnie and business partner Mike Tatum were former CNET programmers Andy McCurdy, Sean Coonce, Ethan Lance, and Dave Snider. Lance and Snider at the time were running their own joint venture known as Enemy Kite, in which they had created Comic Vine. Comic Vine would become the first Whiskey Media website, complete with a full conversion from the PHP format to Whiskey Media's de facto framework, Django.

Later in the year Jeff Gerstmann also left CNET after being controversially fired from his position as Editorial Director of GameSpot. This began a chain reaction in which Ryan Davis, Alex Navarro, Brad Shoemaker and Vinny Caravella would leave after the incident. This led to Whiskey Media and Gerstmann getting in touch with each other and with Ryan Davis they created the video game website, Giant Bomb, which Caravella, Shoemaker, and Navarro later went to work for.

Giant Bomb and subsequent websites, Anime Vice (launched in 2008), Tested and Screened (both launched in 2010) were designed around the same "social publishing" concept as Comic Vine, content created by tech-savvy communities, while being run by small teams of editorial staff, video producers and engineers. In an interview with The New York Times, Bonnie explained that creating a small staffed company as opposed to CNET was a, "great constraint that forces us to do smart stuff." When asked why they didn't go down the route of blog sites such as Joystiq or Engadget, Bonnie said that, "what blogs figured out was how to create a scalable inexpensive model, but there is not a shelf space for content. Content is hard to organize and it is hard to be a reference. If you think about how you create a community, you have to create anchors for community to congregate around." From March 2008 to March 2009 Django co-creator Jacob Kaplan-Moss worked for Whiskey Media as 'software architect.' Whiskey Media then became his first client in his new job at Revolution Systems, an open-source software technical support company.

At the end of 2009 Whiskey Media raised $2.5 million in funding. Paid member subscriptions were made available in 2010, one of the benefits being that paid members would view no advertisements in the future. For the majority of 2008 through 2010, Whiskey Media websites featured very little advertisements, being against cost per mille advertising and also with Mike Tatum noting that they have been, "incredibly lucky to have had the directive to focus completely on our product over the last few years." Tatum announced that advertisements would take a more prominent role on Whiskey Media websites in 2011. In addition to regular advertising, the websites have been shown to utilize their wiki-databases and the social gaming Quest system to incorporate advertisements that "don't disrupt the audience experience." It was announced that Whiskey Media had entered into a mutually beneficial ad sales partnership with Six Apart.

In April 2011, Whiskey Media was one of the many online media companies affected during the outage of Amazon Web Services, using the cloud computing service for a portion of its data storage. Sean Coonce praised social media and streaming media for providing them with platforms to communicate with and provide live content for their user bases during their respective websites' downtime and stated that the incident had no effect on their use of cloud computing or of Amazon itself.

March 2012 saw the end of Whiskey Media's independence when All Things Digital reported that Bonnie had sold the company to Gail Berman and Lloyd Braun's BermanBraun. Bonnie spoke of the sale saying he "couldn't be more excited for the combination." Of the websites included in this deal, Tested has seen the first immediate changes with the addition of Jamie Hyneman and Adam Savage of MythBusters to the website and an overall conceptual and design overhaul.

With the addition of Whiskey's first rate team and powerful, state of the art publishing, data and social tools platform, we will be able to further enhance our user experience and engagement, and provide our advertising partners with unparalleled data insights. One of the other great parts of this acquisition is that we will have Shelby Bonnie in our lives. We have enormous respect for Shelby personally and professionally, and his insights, relationships and acumen will be invaluable to us.

— Lloyd Braun and Gail Berman, March 15, 2012

Also announced that day was CBS Interactive's separate purchase of the Giant Bomb and Comic Vine brands, significant for the return of Gerstmann, Davis, Shoemaker and Caravella to the CBS (owners of CNET) building in which they worked for GameSpot. Designers Dave Snider and Alexis Gallisá, and writer Alex Navarro also joined them in the move, though Navarro continued to work from his home in New York.

== Products ==
=== Websites ===
Big Live LIVE Show: Live! - Ryan Davis as host (seated right) with the staff and guests of Whiskey Media

Whiskey Media created five websites that focus on video games, technology, comics, anime and manga and movies. Occasionally staff will appear in content on other Whiskey Media websites, whereas full-scale collaborations are rare. One such occurrence was the 'Big Live LIVE Show: Live!', a live streaming event that lasted seven hours, showcasing video content in order to promote the launch of paid memberships.

==== Giant Bomb ====
Giant Bomb is a video game-focused website, launched in blog-form on March 6, 2008 and in its complete form on July 21, 2008. Due to the circumstances surrounding its creation and the way it is run, it has gained a reputation as a website that is less business-like and more focused around fun. Its creation came about following the firing of Jeff Gerstmann from GameSpot and many of its staff leaving in turn. Of those, Ryan Davis, Brad Shoemaker and Vinny Caravella joined Gerstmann to create Giant Bomb.

Following its sale to CBS Interactive in 2012, the site was later sold to Red Ventures and then to Fandom during the 2020s. As of 2025, the website is independently owned by its staff.

==== Comic Vine ====
Comic Vine Editorial Team as of May 2015
Member	Position
Tony Guerrero	Co-Creator / Editor-in-Chief / Podcast Host
Mat Elfring	Editor / Podcast Co-Host
Corey Schroeder	Writer / Podcast Co-Host
Gregg Katzman	Writer

Comic Vine is the oldest of the five Whiskey Media websites, and it focuses on comic books. Prior to the creation of Whiskey Media, Dave Snider, Ethan Lance and Tony Guerrero launched ComicVine.com on December 6, 2006. At the time Snider and Lance were creating websites for others as part of the co-founded Enemy Kite while Guerrero was a high-school math teacher. While Snider and Lance built the site Guerrero began to collect data and convert it into what would become the first Whiskey Media wiki-database. With the creation of Whiskey Media, Guerrero was hired full-time to work for the site. In 2009, community member and contributor Sara Lima joined the staff as assistant editor after moving to California.

Comic Vine reviews comics from Marvel, DC and independent companies using the zero to five scale with increments of 0.5. Editorial features include Guerrero's Off My Mind segment, discussing comic book speculation, the ethics, methods and practicalities of superheroes and supervillains and comparisons of current trends, costumes and story arcs with older counterparts. Between August 2009 and August 2017, Guerrero and Lima hosted the weekly Comic Vine podcast in which Lima and Guerrero discussed the biggest comic news, releases and films, often with Tested comic reader Norman Chan. Notable comic book writer James Robinson was a recurring guest on the podcast, providing a deep insight into DC characters. Lima left Comic Vine in July 2013. Since December 2013, long-time Comic Vine writer Mat Elfring joined Tony and Corey on the Comic Vine podcast as a weekly host, which changed the tone of the show into much more of a light-hearted and fun look into each week's comic books. Elfring was made editor of the site in April 2015.

Video content focused on comic book conventions. Comic Vine established a presence at major conventions such as San Diego Comic-Con and its New York and Long Beach equivalents, interviewing important industry figures such as Stan Lee (on multiple occasions), Grant Morrison and Gail Simone. Former video series include Comic Vine News of the Week, a comic book version of Anime Vice's 3-Minute Expert, Preview Theatre and panel topic discussions.

A few weeks after Comic Vine's launch Michael Arrington, formerly of TechCrunch, recommended Comic Vine for its wiki-database and the ways in which a character's database stats could be applied.

Comic Vine was sold to CBS Interactive in 2012 and eventually combined with GameSpot in 2016. The site was sold to Red Ventures in 2020 and then to Fandom, Inc. in 2022.

==== Defunct ====
===== Screened =====
Screened was a movie- and television-themed website. Its existence was leaked on the Tested account of Whiskey Media Engineer Sean Coonce in April 2010. Prior to its launch it was confirmed on the 11th of May edition of the Giant Bombcast that former GameSpot Editors Alex Navarro and Matthew Rorie would be joining their Giant Bomb friends at Whiskey Media as the Editors of Screened. In April 2011 Navarro announced his move to New York, remaining as a writer for both Screened and Giant Bomb.

Screened launched on the 12th of May 2010. In preparation for the site launch, several articles and videos were already uploaded, ready to be accessed by the user-base. They included the It Came from my Instant Queue segment and the weekly DVD Release List as well as news featuring a potential Bad Boys 3 movie and plans for Transformers 3. Several trailers are on the site as well as the inaugural Worse or Worser video in which Navarro and Rorie debate whether Lethal Weapon 3 or Lethal Weapon 4 is the worst of the two. Also included at launch was the first Behind the Screened Door podcast, featuring Navarro, Rorie, intern Matt Lopez and Giant Bomb's Ryan Davis.

Video features, produced by Joey Fameli, included The Besties, Screened's hall of fame, Defending Your Movie, a series to showcase movies that may have not gained critical or commercial success, but have aspects that make them worth watching, and Remake Rematch, pitting one or more remakes against their respective originals.

Screened also has articles by freelance writers such as Tom Pinchuk's recurring Welcome To Weird, which range from body horror films like Videodrome to Japanese TV advertisements starring Arnold Schwarzenegger. and Serious About Series, analysing big budget franchises.

With Screened came an upgraded version of the wiki-database system commonly seen throughout its sister-sites. Users who have gained one-thousand wiki points or more on either Giant Bomb, Comic Vine or Anime Vice (therefore allowing them to by-pass wiki-entry moderation) are automatically given one-thousand points on Screened in order to promote high quality entry submitting into the database as soon as possible as well as lightening the load on the Screened wiki-moderators.

Screened was sold to BermanBraun alongside Tested and AnimeVice in March 2012. During the sale, Screened lost both of its editors and its video production team rendering the site community run. Community Manager FinalDasa managed the site after the sale until its closing in March 2014.

Screened shut down on March 14, 2014 after attempts by owners BermanBraun to revitalise the site by use of a new editor which proved to be unsuccessful. The website's domain name now redirects to Moviefone.

===== Anime Vice =====
Anime Vice was created by the Whiskey Media development team before they had an editorial team. Anime Freelancer Gia Manry was hired as Editor-in-Chief. She brought in Chris Schmitt to help with the news articles and John Martone to the Whiskey Media offices. Together they introduced video features like 3-Minute Expert (which would later also become a feature at Comic Vine) in which Manry would teach users about the various popular aspects of anime, the people who make them and Japanese culture. Trailer Blast, in which Manry, Martone and Video Producer Ana Hurka-Robles watch six trailers, rate them and then choose a favourite for the week. Quick Picks, in which Manry and Martone would list the manga and anime releases for the week, introducing the user-base to manga and anime they may have not seen beforehand. The site also has a video Q+A in which users can find out more about Manry and Martone. Following the success of Comic Vine's Unscripted video reviews Anime Vice also ran some similar Unscripted videos that unlike Comic Vine didn't feature ratings like Comic Vine's 5-star system, the emphasis on what they have to say rather than the score they would give it.

The Anime Vice Squadcast celebrated its one-year anniversary as podcast 52 was released on the 28th of April.

In May 2010, in an effort to make Anime Vice appeal to more casual anime fans and to focus on anime content discussion rather than anime industry news, Manry and Martone were laid-off, prompting a final farewell post by Manry. The Weekly Naruto, One Piece, and Bleach Manga Discussion articles have now been split into three separate discussion articles and Comic Vine contributor Tom Pinchuk's 'What the F@#$ Did I Just Watch?!' segment has now taken a more prominent role on the site. With Manry's departure, Hurka-Robles being reassigned to Tested and without an editorial team there is no video content or any podcasts produced at the moment. Schmitt continues to write news and review manga for the site while Pinchuk writes and records content off-site on a part-time basis.

=== Roku channels ===
Each Whiskey Media website that produces video content has a featured online channel on Roku streaming devices. Giant Bomb and Comic Vine were added in September 2011 along with the Disney Channel. Giant Bomb and Tested are listed in the Tech section, Comic Vine and Screened are listed in the Web TV section.

=== The Big Live Live Show: Live! ===
The Big Live Live Show Live! is Whiskey Media's annual eight-hour live streaming event, featuring the Whiskey Media websites (excluding Anime Vice). The event was created to showcase each website and detail Whiskey Media's premium membership service.

Content ranges from live versions of Giant Bomb's Quick Looks, comedic Mystery Science Theater 3000 style commentary of lesser known films with Screened, Tested's As Seen on TV product testing segments and Comic Vine's multiple interviews with cosplayers and industry figures. Some of these segments would be carried over into Whiskey Media's Friday live show, The Whiskey Media Happy Hour. The live shows featured guests including Eric Pope and John Drake from Harmonix, 11-stringed bass guitarist Jean Baudin, DC Comics writers James Robinson and Geoff Johns, and Capcom's Seth Killian. A new and what was the last song from Buckner & Garcia (following the death of Gary Garcia on November 17, 2011) that was based on Giant Bomb was revealed during the second annual Big Live Live Show: Live!

== Main features ==
=== Community tools and interaction ===
All Whiskey Media websites have an emphasis on small editorial teams with a large amount of community content creation. To this end, many ways to interact with the brands have been applied to the respective websites for each user-base to use.

==== Wiki-database ====
With the exception of Tested, all Whiskey Media sites have a wiki-database in which registered users can freely edit. A point scoring system is in place for editing and adding images to a page; 1000 points will allow one to edit pages without the approval of the wiki-moderators. For 5000 points one will be able to by-pass moderation when creating pages. Each brand has customised sections in their respective databases, ranging from videogames franchises, anime series, comics characters, and movie clichés. Each entry into the databases has its own forum, allowing users to post specifically about subjects without threads being lost in the vast vacuum of forum activity. Each wiki-database page can have trivia questions added to it by users. Moderators can highlight specific database pages that need attention by placing a bounty on them. The bounty points are added on top of the wiki points users gain just from editing. Pages that have bounties placed on are labelled with the changes that are needed. They range from filling in an otherwise empty page, better page formatting, improving upon stale content, changing subjective content and removing unnecessary character, object, concept and location associations.

==== Quests ====
Described as "social gaming experiences that give users incentives to create more content and engage with brands", Quests allow users to gain experience and level-up by doing things as simple as posting a blog or making a list. The quests with more points give hints towards wiki-database pages that users must find like "goofy scavenger hunt tasks."

In August 2010 Whiskey Media launched an advertising campaign with Best Buy using an additional quest set. This was to promote Best Buy's Next Class of laptops for students, utilizing both Whiskey Media's and the Next Class's demographic. Their second advertisement quest set, during July 2011, was in association with Turner Broadcasting System's Adult Swim, promoting the NTSF:SD:SUV:: (National Terrorism Strike Force: San Diego: Sport Utility Vehicle::) show. The final quest involved users watching a NTSF:SD:SUV:: live stream viewing party, featuring an interview with Paul Scheer.

==== Guides ====
Using an upgraded format from traditional text-based FAQs that allows users to "add images, video & tables into our advanced editor that builds a table of contents for you on the fly", the guides on Giant Bomb allow FAQs to be created that detail cheats, in-game achievements, quests and entire games.

==== Profiles ====
Registered user accounts feature blogs complete with RSS feeds for each user, the ability to create lists using everything from the wiki-databases, users reviews and details of all relevant quests, trivia and wiki-database points. Syncing accounts with Social media websites Facebook and Twitter is also available. A universal log-in for users with accounts on more than one Whiskey Media website is now available.

=== Membership services ===
There are three levels of membership on the Whiskey Media websites, one is free and two are paid subscriptions. All three are available globally. A blog on the Whiskey Media website in 2011 stated that they were close to 10,000 premium members.

Free members are able to do everything as listed in the community features from creating lists, blogs and contributing to the wiki-databases. The paid subscription service includes HD Video that is available in streaming, progressive or download, HTML5-based mobile sites and access to a live Friday show. Users who choose to pay per-annum will receive everything that is included in the Monthly subscription service plus no viewable advertisements and a custom T-shirt.

The Friday show, dubbed the "Whiskey Media Happy Hour" features editorial and behind the scenes staff from the brands. It features news on travelling assignments editorial members have made as well as shorter versions of Big Live Live Show: Live! segments.

== Development ==
The technology that runs Giant Bomb, Comic Vine, Anime Vice, Tested and Screened includes the web framework Django, the database management system PostgreSQL, Solr, and MooTools, a JavaScript framework. To track site metrics on video-viewing, or wiki and trivia submissions, the Whiskey Media developers created a set of analytical tools known as "Metrimatics". It allows the staff to track daily "how well [the] publishing platform and content is resonating with each brand's audience."

Whiskey Media is also a user of the Cloud-based video encoding system, Zencoder. Andy McCurdy cited its batch processing functionality "which encoded more than two terabytes of our back catalog" in 720p high definition in under two hours.

== Reception ==
Giant Bomb was Voted by Time Magazine as one of the Top 50 websites of 2011. Jacob Kaplan-Moss hailed Whiskey Media for their "commitment to helping Django thrive." Whiskey Media's method of content created by its users through community tools has been praised for the way it "increases the popularity of the site[s] and gives the business more potential revenue."

The Big Live Live Show: Live! was considered "a labor of love from the whole Whiskey Media family and for the price of free ... there's not too much to complain about here."

== See also ==
- CNET
- Giant Bomb
- Jeff Gerstmann
