= Skydance Direct-to-Consumer =

Streaming service division of Skydance Corporation

- Trade name: Skydance DTC
- Formerly: Paramount Skydance Direct-to-Consumer: CBS Digital Media (2005–2007); CBS Interactive (2007–2021); ViacomCBS Streaming (2021–2022); Paramount Streaming/Direct-to-Consumer (2022–2026); Warner Bros. Discovery Streaming: Home Box Office (2010–2020); WarnerMedia DTC (2020–2022); Warner Bros. Discovery DTC (2022–2025)
- Type: Division
- Industry: Streaming media, video on demand
- Founded: October 6, 2026; 47 days ago
- Key people: Casey Bloys (co-chair & CCO) Jean-Briac Perrette (co-chair & CBO, Skydance TV and DTC)
- Brands: CNN All Access; Discovery+; HBO Max; Paramount+; Pluto TV; The Free Press
- Parent: Skydance
- Subsidiaries: SkyShowtime (50%); Philo (JV); FuboTV (stake); WBTV (FAST channels); Fandango Media (25%)

Skydance Direct-to-Consumer (Skydance DTC) is one of Skydance's main organizational divisions and business segments, responsible for developing and operating direct-to-consumer streaming technologies. It is led by Casey Bloys and Jean-Briac "JB" Perrette as co-chairs.

In the U.S., it operates the various streaming, digital media and direct-to-consumer brands of the company such as HBO Max, Paramount+, Discovery+, Pluto TV, CNN All Access and The Free Press.

Under this division, HBO Max and Paramount+ are set to merge into a single, unified streaming platform with upwards of 200 million global subscribers, but the two services will only be bundled together in the near term.

== History ==
=== As CBS Digital Media and CBS Interactive ===
Logo used from 2008 to 2016

Logo used from 2016 to 2021

Logo used from 2021 to 2022

Logo used from 2022 to 2026

The company was founded in 2005 as CBS Digital Media. In 2007, CBS Digital Media rebranded as CBS Interactive. On May 30, 2007, CBS Interactive acquired Last.fm for £140 million (US$280 million). On June 30, 2008, CNET Networks was acquired by CBS and the assets were merged into CBS Interactive, including Metacritic, GameSpot, TV.com, and Movietome.

On March 15, 2012, it was announced that CBS Interactive acquired video game-based website Giant Bomb and comic book-based website Comic Vine from Whiskey Media, who sold off their other remaining websites to BermanBraun.

On April 17, 2012, it was announced that Major League Gaming and CBS Interactive would be entering a partnership alongside Twitch to be the only exclusive online broadcaster of their Pro Circuit competitions, as well as for advertising representation.

=== CBS Corp./Viacom re-merger and afterwards ===
On November 4, 2019, Variety reported that Jim Lanzone would be leaving the company after nine years to become an executive in residence at Benchmark Capital and would be succeeded by Marc DeBevoise.

CBS Interactive's parent CBS Corporation merged with sister company Viacom on December 4, 2019, forming ViacomCBS. On September 14, 2020, it was announced that Red Ventures would acquire the "CNET Media Group" from ViacomCBS for $500 million, which was finalized on October 30, 2020.

After the divestment of the CNET Media Group, CBS Interactive was dissolved after an organizational restructuring and renamed ViacomCBS Streaming in order to accelerate ViacomCBS direct-to-consumer streaming strategies. On March 4, 2021, ViacomCBS Streaming renamed CBS All Access to Paramount+, with additional streaming content and rebranding taking place at that time.

In late 2021, Comcast and ViacomCBS announced a partnership to launch a new streaming service in more than 20 European territories. SkyShowtime would replace already existing Paramount+ in the Nordics, Hungary, and Poland while launching a fully new service in Albania, Andorra, Bosnia and Herzegovina, Bulgaria, Croatia, Czech Republic, Kosovo, Montenegro, Netherlands, North Macedonia, Portugal, Romania, Serbia, Slovakia, Slovenia, and Spain. ViacomCBS Streaming was renamed as Paramount Streaming, in-line with the rebranding of parent company ViacomCBS to Paramount Global in February 2022.

== Leadership ==
- Jean-Briac "JB" Perrette – Co-chair & chief business officer, Skydance TV and DTC
  - Jeff Cusson – EVP and Head of Communications
- Casey Bloys – Co-chair & chief content officer
  - Glenn Whitehead – President and chief operating officer, HBO and Paramount+
  - Francesca Orsi – President, HBO Drama Series and Films
  - Sarah Aubrey – Head of Paramount+, Max Originals and International Programming
  - Amy Gravitt – EVP, HBO Programming, Head of HBO & HBO Max Comedy Series
  - Nina Rosenstein – EVP, HBO Late Night & Specials Programming
  - Nancy Abraham – Co-EVP, HBO Documentary Programming
    - Lisa Heller – Co-EVP, HBO Documentary Programming
  - Jeff Cusson – EVP and Head of Communications

== Properties ==
Streaming

Paramount Streaming Services Inc. (Note: Internationally in some areas provided as Paramount Global Streaming International LLC (Argentina, Bolivia, Chile, Colombia, Costa Rica, Dominican Republic, Ecuador, El Salvador, Guatemala, Honduras, Mexico, Nicaragua, Panama, Paraguay, Peru, Uruguay, Venezuela), Network Ten All Access Pty Ltd. (Australia), VIMN Germany GmbH (Austria, Germany, Switzerland), Paramount Entertainment Brasil LTDA (Brazil), Paramount Streaming Canada, a division of Paramount Entertainment Canada ULC (Canada), Paramount Pictures International Limited (France, Guadeloupe, Martinique, French Guiana, Réunion, Mayotte, Saint Barthélemy, Saint Martin, Saint Pierre and Miquelon), Viacom International Media Networks U.K. Limited (Ireland, United Kingdom, Guernsey, Jersey, Isle of Man), Paramount Global Italia S.r.l. (Italy, San Marino, Vatican City), MTV Networks de México, S. de R.L. de C.V. (Mexico), CBS Interactive Inc. (United States, District of Columbia, American Samoa, Guam, U.S. Virgin Islands, U.S. Minor Outlying Islands, Northern Mariana Islands).)

- Paramount+

WarnerMedia Global Digital Services, LLC (Note: Internationally in some areas provided as WarnerMedia Direct Australia Pty Ltd (Australia), Discovery Communications Benelux B.V. (Albania, Armenia, Austria, Azerbaijan, Belgium, Cyprus, Estonia, France, Georgia, Germany, Greece, Iceland, Ireland, Israel, Italy, Kazakhstan, Kyrgyzstan, Latvia, Liechtenstein, Lithuania, Luxembourg, Malta, Netherlands, Switzerland, Tajikistan, Ukraine, United Kingdom, Uzbekistan), HBO Europe s.r.o. (Bosnia and Herzegovina, Bulgaria, Croatia, Czech Republic, Hungary, Kosovo, Moldova, Montenegro, Poland, Republic of North Macedonia, Romania, Serbia, Slovakia, Slovenia), HBO Nordic AB (Andorra, Denmark, Finland, Netherlands, Norway, Portugal, Spain, Sweden), WarnerMedia Direct Asia Pacific, LLC (Hong Kong, Indonesia, Malaysia, Philippines, Singapore, Taiwan, Thailand, other designated Asia-Pacific territories), BluTV İletişim Ve Dijital Yayın Hizmetleri A.Ş. (Turkey), WarnerMedia Direct, LLC (United States, District of Columbia, designated U.S. territories), WarnerMedia Direct Latin America, LLC (Argentina, Brazil, Chile, Colombia, Mexico, other designated Latin American and Caribbean countries and territories).)

- HBO Max

Discovery Communications, LLC (Note: Internationally in some areas provided as DPlay Entertainment Limited (Austria, Germany, Ireland, Italy, Norway, Sweden, United Kingdom), Discovery Digital Ventures, LLC (United States and U.S. territories), Discovery Networks Asia-Pacific Pte. Ltd. (Philippines), Rogers Media Inc. (Canada).)

- Discovery+

Pluto Inc. (Note: Internationally in some areas provided as Pluto Inc. (Argentina, Bolivia, Brazil, Canada, Chile, Colombia, Costa Rica, Dominican Republic, Ecuador, El Salvador, Guatemala, Honduras, Mexico, Nicaragua, Panama, Paraguay, Peru, United States, Uruguay, Venezuela), Pluto TV Europe GmbH (Austria, Finland, France, Germany, Ireland, Italy, Spain, Switzerland, United Kingdom), VIMN Nordic AB (Denmark, Norway, Sweden).)

- Pluto TV

Cable News Network, Inc.

- CNN All Access

Channel 5 Broadcasting Limited

- 5

TVN S.A.

- Player

Broadcasting

CBS, Inc.

- CBS News 24/7
- CBS Sports HQ

Showtime Networks, Inc.

- Paramount+ with Showtime
  - Showtime 2
  - Showtime Showcase
  - SHO×BET
  - Showtime Extreme
  - Showtime Family Zone
  - Showtime Women
- The Movie Channel
- Flix

Media

Bleacher Report, Inc.

- Bleacher Report

Cable News Network, Inc.

- CNN Business
- CNN.com

CBS Interactive, Inc.

- ETonline.com
- StarTrek.com

CBS News, Inc.

- CBS MoneyWatch
- CBSNews.com

CBS Sports, Inc.

- 247Sports
- CBSSports.com

Discovery Golf, Inc.

- GolfDigest.com

Runway Media, Inc.

- The Free Press

Telepictures Productions, Inc.

- ExtraTV.com
- JenniferHudsonShow.com
- TrueCrimeNews.com

Television Food Network, G.P.

- Food.com

=== Share of equity capital ===
- FuboTV (undisclosed stake; 70% owned by The Walt Disney Company)
- SkyShowtime (50%; joint venture with Comcast)
- Philo (joint venture with A+E Global Media and AMC Global Media)
- WBTV (FAST streaming channels)
- Fandango Media (25%; joint venture with Versant)
  - Fandango (movie ticketing platform)
  - Fandango (streaming service)
  - INDY Cinema Group
  - MovieTickets.com
  - Rotten Tomatoes
    - Rotten Tomatoes Movieclips

=== Divested/defunct ===
- 10 All Access (defunct 2021, now Paramount+)
- BET+ (defunct 2026)
- BNET (defunct 2012)
- Chowhound (divested to Red Ventures in 2020)
- CNET (divested to Red Ventures in 2020)
- Comic Vine (divested to Red Ventures in 2020)
- Download.com (divested to Red Ventures in 2020)
- GameFAQs (divested to Red Ventures in 2020)
- GameRankings (divested to Red Ventures in 2020)
- GameSpot (divested to Red Ventures in 2020)
- Giant Bomb (divested to Red Ventures in 2020)
- Last.fm (divested 2026)
- Metacritic (divested to Red Ventures in 2020)
- MetroLyrics (divested to Red Ventures in 2020)
- Noggin (defunct 2024, later divested in 2025)
- Nick+ (defunct 2022)
- onGamers (defunct 2015)
- Radio.com (divested to Entercom in 2017)
- TechRepublic (divested to Red Ventures in 2020)
- TV.com (divested to Red Ventures in 2020)
- TVGuide.com (divested to Red Ventures in 2020)
- UrbanBaby (defunct 2020)
- ZDNet (divested to Red Ventures in 2020)

== See also ==
- Disney Streaming
- NBCUniversal Direct-to-Consumer and Digital Enterprises
- Paramount Digital Entertainment
- Time Warner Interactive
- Warner Bros. Games
