= GameFAQs =

Video game website

- Screenshot Screenshot of the GameFAQs home page, as it appeared on May 20, 2023
- Website type: Gaming
- Available in: English
- Owner: Fandom, Inc.
- Creator: Jeff "CJayC" Veasey
- Website: gamefaqs.gamespot.com
- IPv6 support: No
- Commercial: Yes
- Registration: Optional, but is required for contributing content and posting on the message boards
- Launched: November 5, 1995; 31 years ago (as Video Game FAQ Archive)
- Current status: Active
- Written in: PHP

GameFAQs is a video gaming website that hosts guides and other resources, as well as an active message board forum. It was created in November 1995 by Jeff Veasey and has been owned by Fandom, Inc. since October 2022. Allen "SBAllen" Tyner was lead Admin for twenty years until stepping down on October 18, 2023. The site is currently run by Community Manager "DToast".

The site has a database of video game information, walkthroughs, FAQs, cheat codes, reviews, game saves, box art images, and screenshots, almost all of which are submitted by volunteer contributors. It covers game systems made as far back as the 1980s to current day modern consoles as well as computer games and mobile games. GameFAQs also hosts an active message board community, which has a separate discussion board for each game in the site's database, along with a variety of other boards. GameFAQs has run daily opinion polls and tournament contests, as well as annual Character Battles, since November 30, 1999.

GameFAQs has been positively reviewed by The Guardian, The Canadian Press, and Entertainment Weekly. In 2009, GameFAQs.com was one of the 300 highest-trafficked English-language websites according to Alexa.

== History ==
GameFAQs was started as the Video Game FAQ Archive on November 5, 1995, by gamer and programmer Jeff Veasey. The site was created to bring numerous online guides and FAQs from across the internet into one centralized location. Hosted on America Online (AOL), it originally served as a mirror of Andy Eddy's FTP FAQ archive. The initial version of the site had approximately 10 pages and 100 FAQs. In 1996, the site moved to gamefaqs.com and changed its name to GameFAQs. At this time, GameFAQs listed fewer than 1000 FAQs and guides and was updated on an irregular basis.

During the following months, the site grew in content and in design; two different styles were introduced in early 1997 to accommodate the support of tables in web browsers (or the lack thereof). Two key features of the site—the game search engine and the contributor recognition pages—were planned at this time.

=== IGN affiliation ===
In 1997, GameFAQs became an independent affiliate of the Imagine Games Network (IGN), leading to the placement of affiliate links on the home page. User contests were introduced during this period; the first monthly contest, which was held in 1998, received 253 entries. GameFAQs went through several design changes, including a pink color scheme, before arriving at the blue-colored layout that was used until 2004.

In November 1999, several changes occurred in rapid succession. A search box was added to every page on November 5, the site’s fourth anniversary. On November 7, the message boards opened in a beta testing mode. The "Poll of the Day" was introduced at the end of the month. These changes marked Veasey's increased concentration on the site, and it was around this time that GameFAQs became his full-time job. Until this time, he had been working as a programmer. On August 9, 2000, the site received one million hits in a single day for the first time. By 2001, the "GameFAQs Chat" (an IRC chat server) had been launched; however, it was removed in May 2001 due to administrative issues.

=== Post-IGN ===
On January 9, 2001, GameFAQs ended its association with IGN. To continue generating revenue, an advertising banner sold to non-profit organizations was placed on the top of each page. This lasted until CNET Networks became an official affiliate of GameFAQs; CNET ads ran on the top of the page, and links to news articles from GameSpot were shown on the home page. In September 2002, the ad was moved from the horizontal header to the vertical sidebar. This led to changes to the links on the side, as well as the creation of navigational links at the top of the screen. Contributions to GameFAQs continued to increase, and Veasey, as sole operator and administrator of the site, dedicated significant portions of his time to ensure that GameFAQs remained updated and successful.

On April 1, 2002, Veasey changed GameFAQs to "GameFAX" as an April Fools' joke. The site's colors were changed to green and black to imitate those of the Xbox, with the intention of making users believe that GameFAQs was now dedicated solely to the Xbox, "the only system that matters." After clicking on any link on the main page, users were directed to the real GameFAQs home page. Nevertheless, Veasey reported receiving hate mail from users.

On March 2, 2002, Veasey participated in a radio interview with WXBH AM-1190 on their program called "The Gaming Files." During this interview, Veasey was drilled with questions from current and former users of GameFAQs; he also discussed his time on GameFAQs and how the site came to be.

=== CNET acquisition ===
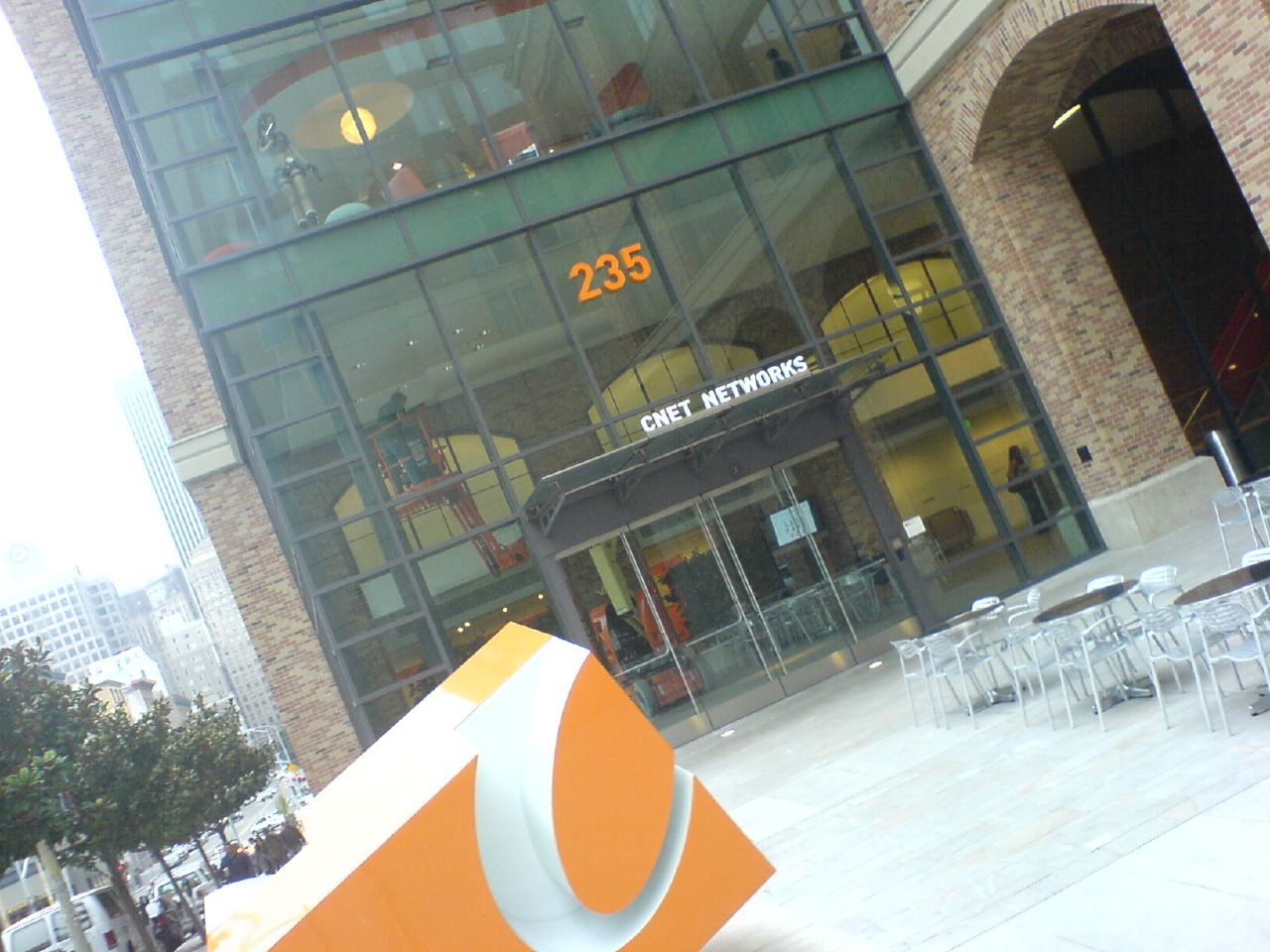
CNET Networks headquarters in San Francisco, California

On May 6, 2003, CNET Networks (the site's long-standing affiliate and sponsor) acquired GameFAQs. The amount paid for GameFAQs and two other unrelated websites was US$2.2 million. On June 3, 2003, Veasey announced the merger to the users of the site. He clarified that the user-submitted content (i.e., FAQs and reviews) remained under the ownership of the authors and was not (nor could be) sold to CNET; however, CNET acquired GameFAQs' rights to host them on the site. He assured users that GameFAQs would undergo no major administrative change and said, "The GameFAQs you see today is the one you'll see tomorrow." This was true to a certain extent, as the only visible change over the next few months was the addition of a CNET footer to the bottom of every page. Additional changes included moving the site to servers in California.

From 2004 to 2006, GameFAQs witnessed further changes. On April 28, 2004, GameFAQs implemented a large visual redesign, and the boards merged with the GameSpot boards to allow both communities to share the same game-specific boards (to the dismay of many GameFAQs users). To facilitate the merger, GameFAQs converted its board code from ASP to PHP, and GameSpot dropped its Lithium code. On April 11, 2006, a new design was implemented, and the GameSpot logo was added to the GameFAQs logo on the header of every page. This change was initially greeted with general disapproval by users on the message boards. To satisfy those who prefer the earlier layout, the old board pages have been preserved for certain users. Shortly after the redesign, the site began using the Smarty template engine.

On February 6, 2018, the site changed its domain from gamefaqs.com to gamefaqs.gamespot.com, due to CNET integrating GameFAQs into the GameSpot network. The link gamefaqs.com now redirects to gamefaqs.gamespot.com as a result.

=== Veasey's departure ===
On July 19, 2007, Veasey announced that he would eventually be leaving the site. According to his announcement, Allen Tyner, who had been employed with the site since 2004, would take over as editor and administrator of GameFAQs.

=== Red Ventures acquisition ===
Red Ventures acquired various properties, including GameFAQs and GameSpot, from ViacomCBS in 2020.

=== Fandom acquisition ===
Fandom acquired various properties, including GameFAQs and GameSpot, from Red Ventures in October 2022.

In February 2026, Fandom filed a civil suit in the United States District Court for the Northern District of California against a number of unnamed defendants. The complaint asserts claims under the Racketeer Influenced and Corrupt Organizations Act arising from alleged harassment of the site's moderators. The case was subsequently dismissed with prejudice due to the misidentification of A.H., and dismissed without prejudice regarding "Does" 1-10, meaning the matter can be reopened in future dates.

== Content ==
Growth of FAQs hosted (1995-2012)

View source data.

All of the guides and walkthroughs on GameFAQs are contributed by volunteers. Most of the FAQs are not actually lists of frequently asked questions; instead, they cover aspects of gameplay in the same way as strategy guides, with walkthroughs, item lists, maps, and puzzle solutions. Nearly all of the FAQs hosted on the site are in plain text, though GameFAQs does also accept stand-alone images, such as maps, diagrams, and puzzle solutions. From December 2009, formatted guides which allow authors to use mark-up loosely based on Wiki markup in the document were being accepted. In addition to FAQs, contributors can also submit reader reviews, cheat codes, developer credits, game release data, game saves, screenshots, and images of game boxes. In 2006, the site hosted over 36,000 guides. By February 2009, over 49,000 guides were hosted on the site and over 113,194 reviews. As of 2012, this had increased to over 56,000 guides for 21,639 unique games.

When an author submits something to GameFAQs, it is screened by an administrator before being posted on the site. The author retains the copyright on the submitted material, and their name is added to the site's "Contributor Recognition" section. GameFAQs agrees to host the guide only on their servers but does allow other affiliates to link directly to the guides (including GameSpot, Yahoo! Games, AOL, and GameFly).

GameFAQs features several ongoing contributor contests, including FAQ of the Month, Review of the Month, and numerous "FAQ Bounties," which reward contributors who submit FAQs for uncovered, high-demand games. The FOTM and ROTM contests are generally picked from comprehensive, complete guides or reviews for new games. Winners were sent a gift certificate for an online retailer or could opt for a mailed gift card upon contest entry; however, this system turned to simple recognition after the Red Ventures acquisition. Currently, winners are sent a voucher for the Fandom-owned site Fanatical.

In 2004, Future Network USA published two commercial strategy guides with material from GameFAQs: The Ultimate Xbox Strategy Guide and The Ultimate PS2 Strategy Guide. These guides were composed of FAQs written by contributors on GameFAQs.

=== Message boards ===
Every game listed on GameFAQs has its own message board, where both novice and experienced gamers can discuss game strategies and other game-related topics. After the redesign of May 2004, the game boards with enforced topicality were shared with the GameSpot community (another CBS Interactive website). Certain popular games may have additional boards for social discussion. Game-specific boards for certain older consoles do not have topicality rules and are often claimed for social discussion—these are referred to as "secret" or "dead" boards. Every system also has a general board for discussing hardware and upcoming games.

GameFAQs has boards made purely for the purpose of socializing, some that cater to special interests (such as Anime, TV, Music, and Pro Wrestling), and some purely for users from a particular region (e.g., United Kingdom, Australia/New Zealand). GameFAQs also has boards for official announcements, contributor discussion, contest discussion, suggestions, and site help.

The custom-made GameFAQs Message Boards coded by Veasey began operation on November 7, 1999. Although the original purpose of the board system was to facilitate game discussion, other board categories have been added since the boards opened. Every day, approximately 20,000 topics and 200,000 messages are posted on GameFAQs' 60,000+ individual boards, and on November 7, 2006, there were more than 100,000 accounts actively in use. During October 2009, there was an average of 84,853 unique logins a day.

On March 23, 2012, it was announced the GameFAQs and GameSpot will once again start to separate content. On May 7, 2012, the shared GameFAQs-run message boards went read-only on GameSpot.

==== Features ====
Posts made on the message boards are mostly plain text. Some HTML mark-up is used on the boards, including bold and italics tags. The forums use a wordfilter to prevent the use of certain vulgar words, which is intended to keep the forum safe for all readers. On some boards, topics that have no new posts for a period of time are removed permanently or are locked and archived.

GameFAQs users gain one "karma" for every day they visit the boards while logged in. As karma increases, new features become available, such as the ability to post more messages per day, edit posts, and send private messages. Users can add favorite boards to a personalized list on the main boards page and can track specific topics (a feature added in 2006).

==== Moderators ====
The message boards are managed by the site's administrators and moderators. Initially, Veasey was the only administrator and therefore had full control over the boards; however, more administrators have since been appointed. Tyner, who uses the username "SBAllen" (formerly "Sailor Bacon"), was the main administrator on the boards until 2023. On May 7, 2012, Tyner announced long-time moderator Devin Morgan had been hired as another administrator; his primary role was to work on the code of the site. On September 5, 2014, Tyner also announced that long time user Stephanie Barnes (under the username Krystal109) had been hired as the site's Community Manager, which included duties such as running the site's contests and the Facebook/Twitter feeds. As of July 2015, Barnes was no longer part of the team. Allen "SBAllen" Tyner stepped down from his lead admin position in October 18, 2023. ZoopSoul was brought onto Metacritic's staff in May 2025 in a realignment, and officially handed off his responsibilities as Contributor Lead of GameFAQs to DToast throughout the remainder of the year. The site is currently run by Community Manager "DToast", who is the lead board Admin and Contributor Lead.

GameFAQs' moderators are volunteer users selected by the administrator and are responsible for keeping order within the message board community. Because of the size of the boards, the moderators do not patrol every board and topic. Instead, messages that break the site's Terms of Service can be "marked" by regular users, which brings them to the attention of the moderators.
