= ComicBook.com =

Entertainment news website

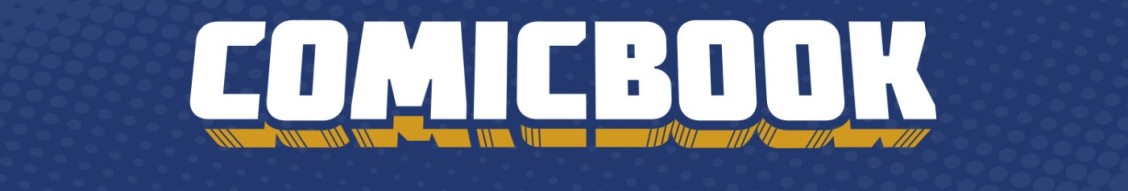

- Homepage in 2024
- Website type: Infotainment
- Available in: English
- Founded: 2007
- Headquarters: Nashville, Tennessee
- Owner: Savage Ventures
- Founder: Joe Blackmon
- Key people: Ben Kendrick (editorial director)
- Website: comicbook.com
- Commercial: Yes
- Launched: 2007; 19 years ago
- Current status: Active

ComicBook.com is an entertainment website that offers news in the fields of comic books, television, films, video games, and anime. The site came online in 1996 as a holding page for sales links and press releases related to comic books under various domain names, before becoming ComicBook.com in 2004. In 2007, Joe Blackmon founded the website as a comic book news site. The site was relaunched in 2014 following Shannon Terry becoming CEO. ComicBook.com was acquired by CBS Interactive (which later became part of Paramount Global) in 2018 before Paramount Global sold it to Savage Ventures in 2024, and Ben Kendrick was hired as the editorial director.

== History ==
ComicBook.com began as a holding page containing sales links and press releases related to comic books and had various names used by various companies: in 1996, American Entertainment used it for their websites, Smash, Another Universe, and Mania Magazine. The site was acquired by Fandom in 2000 before it was changed to Cinescape in 2001. By 2004, the site was renamed ComicBook.com.

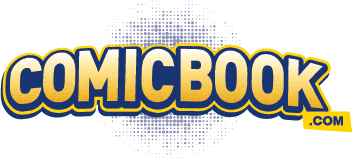
Prior logos used for ComicBook.com

In 2007, Joe Blackmon and a business partner founded ComicBook.com as a comic book news site, and by 2010, it was co-owned by William King of Magellen Press. At this time, it had formed into its own website, posting news about comic books and other fields related to comics. In January 2014, 247Sports CEO Shannon Terry became the CEO of ComicBook.com, with Blackmon becoming the site's president. At that time, the site had eight full time staff, with several part-time writers. Terry relaunched the site in May 2014 with new features, such as message boards, polls, and a larger focus on social media. Jim Viscardi served as editor from 2015, with Sam Savage as CEO from 2016.

In April 2018, CBS Interactive (which later became part of Paramount Global) acquired ComicBook.com as well as PopCulture.com. Following the acquisition, Savage left as CEO. In April 2024, Viscardi left ComicBook.com to become VP of Business Development at Image Comics, with the site then being led by assistant managing editor Joe Schmidt. In August 2024, Paramount Global sold ComicBook.com and PopCulture.com to Savage's digital media operator, Savage Ventures, as part of its plan to divest assets and achieve $500 million in cost savings. At that time, both ComicBook.com and PopCulture.com employed over 40 people. While no layoffs or leadership changes were initially expected, following the acquisition, several employees were let go from the company including Schmidt. The next month, Ben Kendrick was revealed to have joined Savage Ventures and was hired as the editorial director of ComicBook.com, after previously working at Static Media, and prior to that Screen Rant, Comic Book Resources, and Collider.

== Content ==
The site offers news, interviews, and reviews centered on comic books, television, films, video games, and anime among others. ComicBook.com has also produced video content and podcasts, including the ComicBook Nation podcast, the Marvel Comics and Marvel Cinematic Universe–centered Phase Zero podcast, A Wild Podcast Has Appeared, and the daily news and entertainment video series Daily Distraction. In 2023, ComicBook.com collaborated with Entertainment Tonight on The Last of Pods podcast for the first season of HBO's series The Last of Us. By October 2024, Phase Zero had ended as its hosts had all been laid off from ComicBook.com; they went on to create the unaffiliated pop culture-focused podcast Phase Hero.
