= Nick+ =

International Streaming service owned by Paramount Global

- Available in: Croatian, English, Portuguese, Greek, German, Japanese and Serbian
- Dissolved: August 31, 2022; 4 years ago
- Country of origin: Canada
- Area served: Bosnia and Herzegovina; Croatia; Portugal; Greece; Germany; Japan; Montenegro; Serbia
- Owners: Paramount Global; Corus Entertainment (branding licensed from Paramount Global, operations in Canada, 2019-2022)
- Parent: Paramount Streaming
- Website: www.nickplus.ca
- Launched: December 10, 2019; 6 years ago

Nick+ (also known as Nickelodeon Plus, Nickelodeon+ or Nick Plus) was an international streaming video service owned by Paramount Global that offers access to many Nickelodeon shows. It was launched by Corus Entertainment in Canada on December 10, 2019, as an Amazon Prime Video channel. It would later also become accessible on Apple TV channels. A couple years later on August 31, 2022, Nick+ in Canada was shut down with all of its programming being moved to Paramount+ in Canada.

Between 2020 and 2023, Nick+ was made available in Portugal, by the operators Meo and Vodafone. The service would be discontinued due to the launch of SkyShowtime, which serves as the country's equivalent to Paramount+.

== Available programming (Canada) ==
Show	Year	Launch
Rugrats	1991–2004	December 10, 2019
The Ren & Stimpy Show	1991–1996	December 10, 2019
Hey, Arnold	1996–2004	December 10, 2019
Kenan & Kel	1996–2000	December 10, 2019
Blue's Clues	1996–2006	December 10, 2019
CatDog	1998–2005	December 10, 2019
SpongeBob SquarePants	1999–present	December 10, 2019
Dora the Explorer	2000–2014	December 10, 2019
The Fairly OddParents	2001–2017	December 10, 2019
Drake & Josh	2004–2007	December 10, 2019
Avatar: The Last Airbender	2005–2008	December 10, 2019
iCarly	2007–2012	December 10, 2019
Ni Hao, Kai Lan	2008–2011	December 10, 2019
Team Umizoomi	2010–2015	December 10, 2019
Bubble Guppies	2011–2023	December 10, 2019
Sam & Cat	2013–2014	December 10, 2019
Paw Patrol	2013–present	December 10, 2019
Henry Danger	2014–2020	December 10, 2019
Blaze and the Monster Machines	2014–2025	December 10, 2019
The Loud House	2016–present	December 10, 2019
Rise of the Teenage Mutant Ninja Turtles	2018–2020	December 10, 2019
The Casagrandes	2019–2022	December 10, 2019
