= TV.com =

Website devoted to English-language shows

- Website type: Entertainment
- Dissolved: June 28, 2021; 5 years ago
- Parent: CNET (2005–2008); CBS Interactive (2008–2020); Red Ventures (2020–2021)
- Registration: Optional
- Launched: June 1, 2005; 21 years ago
- Current status: Defunct

TV.com was a website owned by Red Ventures that covered television series and episodes with a focus on English-language shows made or broadcast in Australia, Canada, Ireland, Japan, New Zealand, the United States, and the United Kingdom. Originally launched by CNET in the mid-1990s, the website was transformed in 2005 when CNET acquired the website TV Tome and incorporated its assets into the new website's composition. CNET Networks, including the TV.com site, was later purchased by CBS in 2008. In its heyday, TV.com emphasized user-generated content listings for a wide variety of programs that included episode air dates, descriptions, news, season listings, notes, credits, trivia, and a forum section.

Although TV.com was successful as an information website in the late 2000s, it went without regular updates beginning in 2019. On June 28, 2021, the TV.com website was quietly shut down with no redirect put in its place.

== History ==
CNET originally acquired the domain name (among other generic domain names like news.com, radio.com, etc.) in the mid-1990s to host a website for the company's technology-related TV shows. One of these shows was titled TV.com. The program, highlighting the best of the Internet for new and casual computer users, aired in U.S. syndication, and featured Ron Reagan as a correspondent.

On April 22, 2005, CNET acquired TV Tome, a fan-run television database. TV.com was launched a few months after that acquisition on June 1, 2005.

On May 15, 2008, CBS formally announced its purchase of CNET Networks, and the company changed its name to CBS Interactive.

TV.com continually looked at innovating the television viewing experience by incorporating it with technology, as seen with the creation of WatchList.

=== TV Tome ===
TV Tome
- Website type: Entertainment
- Dissolved: June 13, 2005
- Owner: CNET Networks, Inc.
- Creator: John Nestoriak III
- Website: web.archive.org/web/20050210011938/http://tvtome.com/
- Launched: July 11, 2000
- Current status: Defunct

TV Tome was an American website devoted to documenting English language television shows and their production. It was run by volunteer editors, with the assistance of user contributions. The site was founded by John Nestoriak III.

On April 22, 2005, TV Tome officially announced its acquisition by CNET.

=== Relay ===
TV.com Relay was a social television check-in application that was available via mobile networks and web.
