= CNET Download =

Internet download directory

- Website type: Downloads
- Owner: Ziff Davis
- Creator: CNET
- Website: download.cnet.com
- IPv6 support: No
- Commercial: Yes
- Registration: Optional
- Launched: October 23, 1996; 30 years ago
- Current status: Active

CNET Download (originally Download.com) is an Internet download directory website launched in 1996 as a part of CNET. Initially it resided on the domain download.com, and then download.com.com for a while, and is now download.cnet.com. The domain download.com attracted at least 113 million visitors annually by 2008 according to a Compete.com study.

== Overview ==
The offered content is available in four major categories: software (including Windows, Mac and mobile), music, games, and videos, offered for download via FTP from Download.com's servers or third-party servers. Videos are streams (at present) and music was all free MP3 downloads, or occasionally rights-managed WMAs or streams until it was replaced with last.fm.

The Software section includes over 100,000 freeware, shareware, and try-first downloads. Downloads are often rated and reviewed by editors and contain a summary of the file from the software publisher. Registered users may also write reviews and rate the product. Software publishers are permitted to distribute their titles via CNET's Upload.com site for free, or for a fee structure that offers enhancements.

Up until 2015 CNet used Spigot Inc to monetize the traffic to download.com. According to Sean Murphy, then a General Manager at CNet, "Spigot continues to be a great partner to Download.com, sharing our desire to balance customer experience with revenue."

== Malware distribution ==
In August 2011, Download.com introduced an installation manager called CNET TechTracker for delivering many of the software titles from its catalog. This installer included trojans and bloatware, such as toolbars. CNET admitted in their download FAQ that "a small number of security publishers have flagged the Installer as adware or a potentially unwanted application".

In December 2011, Gordon Lyon, writing under his pseudonym Fyodor wrote of his strong dislike of the installation manager and the bundled software. His post was very popular on social networks, and was reported by a few dozen media. The main problem is the confusion between the content offered on Download.com and the software offered by the original authors; the accusations included deception as well as copyright and trademark violation.

In 2014, The Register and US-CERT warned that via download.com's "foistware", an "attacker may be able to download and execute arbitrary code". In 2015, research by Emsisoft suggested that all free download portals bundled their downloads with potentially unwanted software, and that Download.com was the worst offender.

A study done by How-To Geek in 2015 revealed that Download.com was packaging malware inside their installers. The test was done in a virtual machine where the testers downloaded the Top 10 apps. These all contained crapware/malware; one example was the KMPlayer installer, which installed a rogue antivirus named 'Pro PC Cleaner' and attempted to execute WajamPage.exe. Some downloads, specifically YTD, were completely blocked by Avast.

Another study done by How-To Geek in 2015 revealed that Download.com was installing fake SSL certificates inside their installers, similar to the Lenovo Superfish certificate. These fake certificates can completely compromise SSL encryption and allow man-in-the-middle attacks.

However, in July 2016, How-To Geek discovered that Download.com no longer included adware/malware in its downloads and that its Installer program had been discontinued.
