= Chowhound =

American food and cuisine website

- Company type: Privately owned
- Website type: Online food community
- Founded: 1997
- Dissolved: March 28, 2022
- Country of origin: United States
- Owners: Jim Leff and Bob Okumura (1997-2006); CNET Networks (2006-2020); Red Ventures (2020-2023); Static Media (2023–present)
- Founders: Jim Leff; Bob Okumura
- Industry: Food and drink
- Website: www.chowhound.com

Chowhound is an American based food website launched in 1997. It changed ownership in 2006 and 2020, with its third owner suspending the website in March 2022. In October 2023, Static Media purchased the operation, reactivating the website in November 2023.

== History ==
Chowhound was founded in 1997 by jazz trombonist and food writer Jim Leff and Bob Okumura as an online community for food enthusiasts. It focused on regional specialties, local favorites, and hard-to-find foods at a time when such topics received relatively little mainstream attention in the United States. Food critics Jonathan Gold and Robert Sietsema were among its early contributors. In 2006, Leff and Okumura sold the site to CNET Networks, which redesigned it and merged it with CHOW magazine, keeping its forums, grouped by locale, and dropping chowhound.com in favor of the magazine's chow.com domain. After CNET was merged into CBS Interactive in 2008, the original chowhound.com domain was restored and CHOW was eliminated. The website was bought by Red Ventures, in 2020.

In March, 2022, Red Ventures announced the site would close after 25 years online.

Static Media acquired Chowhound in October 2023 and relaunched the website in November.

== Book series ==
Penguin USA published two Chowhound restaurant guides, The Chowhound's Guide to the San Francisco Bay Area, and The Chowhound's Guide to the New York Tristate Area.

== See also ==
- List of websites about food and drink
