= The Points Guy =

American travel website and blog

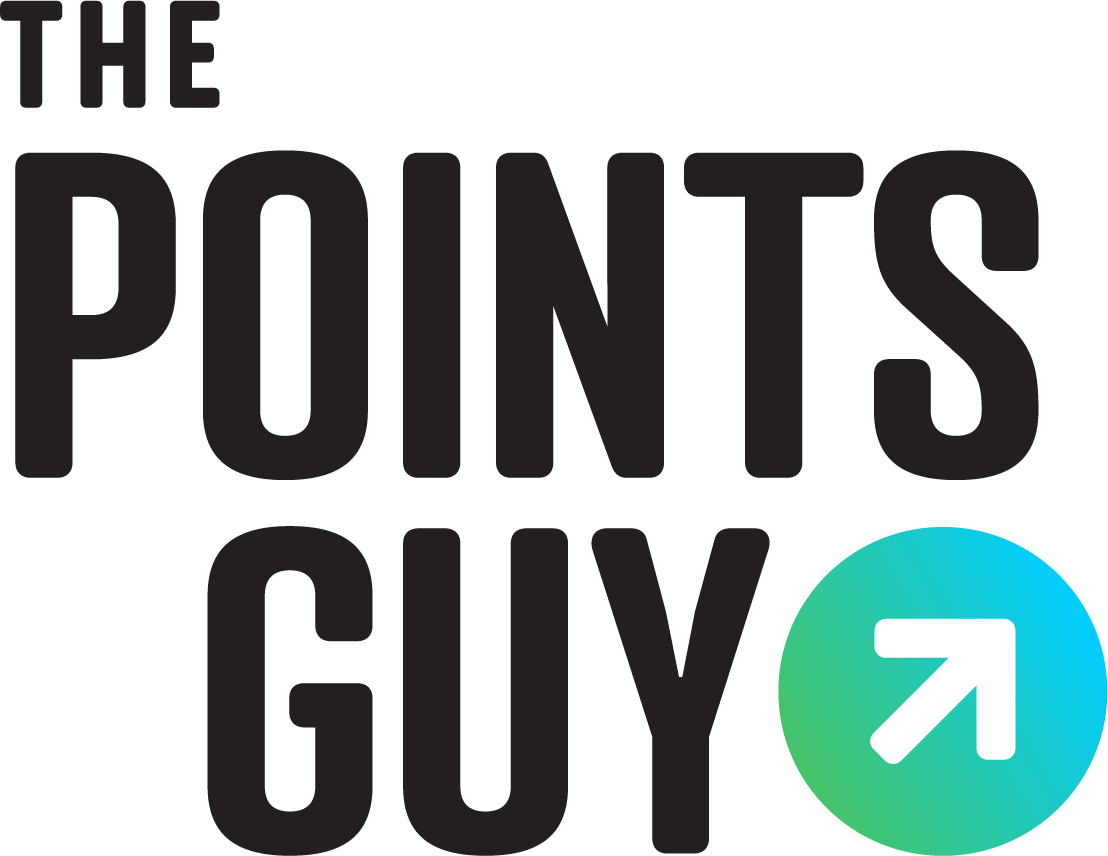
- Founded: 2010
- Founder: Brian Kelly
- Key people: Liza Landsman (CEO)
- Number of employees: ▲20 (2017)
- Parent: Red Ventures
- Website: thepointsguy.com

The Points Guy (TPG) is an American travel website and blog that produces sponsored news and stories on travel, means of accumulating and using airline points and miles, and credit cards (in particular, credit card reviews). The site was founded in 2010 and was initially a blog written by founder Brian Kelly. By 2017, the site employed 20 full-time staff in addition to 50 freelance contributors.

== History ==
Brian Kelly became interested in frequent-flyer programs while attending college at the University of Pittsburgh. After graduation, he went to work for Morgan Stanley, where he developed a reputation with colleagues as the "points guy" due to his knowledge about how credit card usage allowed users to maximize travel points.

Kelly launched The Points Guy as a personal website in 2010. He began monetizing content through affiliate marketing partnerships in February 2011. Shortly thereafter, Kelly left his job at Morgan Stanley.

In 2012, Bankrate, a company that publishes and promotes financial content, acquired The Points Guy brand. In a 2014 interview, Brian Kelly stated: "I still have a vested ownership interest in TPG and I retain 100% editorial control."

Between 2012 and 2017, TPG acquired three competing websites: Million Mile Secrets, Mommy Points, and Travel is Free.

In 2016, TPG started Points for Peace, a partnership with the nonprofit PeaceJam Foundation. The initiative allows users to donate frequent flyer miles to help Nobel Peace Prize winners travel to developing countries. The next year TPG began a similar partnership with Rainbow Railroad, allowing users to donate miles to help LGBTQI people escape countries where they face violence and persecution.

In 2017, Brian Kelly was named the top influencer for travel by Forbes. Bankrate was acquired by digital marketing company Red Ventures in 2017.

In 2020 Business Insider reported that multiple TPG employees had anonymously accused Kelly of fostering a toxic work environment, including drug use and abusive behavior toward staff. Red Ventures responded with a statement saying Kelly unequivocally denied all allegations and that TPG did not tolerate any forms of harassment or discrimination.

In September 2021, TPG released an app to track airline points and miles across multiple airlines.

On January 11, 2022, TPG preemptively sued American Airlines, asking a Delaware court to make it legal for customers to manage their frequent flyer data on a third-party website. The filing was in response to a cease and desist letter from American Airlines, demanding TPG not track the data of its AAdvantage members who opted-in to share their info with the TPG app. On January 22, 2022, American Airlines filed suit against The Points Guy in a federal court in Texas, claiming the company's app violated its trademark and the terms of the airlines’ frequent flyer program. The case was settled in November 2022, but no details of the settlement were disclosed.

In 2025 Liza Landsman was appointed CEO.

== Operations ==
The Points Guy is a subsidiary of American media company Red Ventures. Liza Landsman is the CEO. The company is headquartered in New York City. As of 2025, The Points Guy had around 150 employees.

The Points Guy operates a travel-focused website and app. The website includes news and sponsored content, with a focus on tips for accumulating airline points and miles, as well as more general aviation, hospitality, and credit card news. The app allows users to track points and miles from different loyalty programs. The Points Guy receives revenue through affiliate marketing partnerships with credit card companies. These fees are based on traffic from the site related to credit cards participating in loyalty programs. Among the company's partners are Citi, Bank of America, Chase, and Capital One.
