= Metacritic =

American review aggregation website

- Website type: Review aggregator
- Parent: CNET (2005–2008); CBS Interactive (2008–2020); Red Ventures (2020–2022); Fandom, Inc. (2022–present)
- Website: metacritic.com
- Commercial: Yes
- Registration: Free/subscription
- Launched: January 2001; 25 years ago
- Current status: Active
- OCLC number: 911795326

Metacritic is an American website that aggregates reviews of films, television shows, music albums, video games, and formerly books. For each product, the scores from each review are averaged (a weighted average). Metacritic was created by Jason Dietz, Marc Doyle, and Julie Doyle Roberts in 1999, and was acquired by Fandom, Inc. in 2022.

Metacritic turns each critic and user review into a respective percentage score. This can be done either by calculating the score from the rating given or by making a subjective decision based on the review's quality. Before averaging the scores, they are adjusted based on the critic's popularity, reputation, and the number of reviews they have written. The site also includes a summary from each review and links to the original source, using colors like green, yellow, or red to indicate the overall sentiment of the critics.

Metacritic won two Webby Awards for excellence as an aggregation website. It is regarded as the foremost online review aggregation site for the video game industry. Criticism of the site has focused on the assessment system, the assignment of scores to reviews that do not include ratings, third-party attempts to influence the scores, and the reported lack of staff oversight for user reviews. It has been noted that users can create multiple sock puppet accounts to review bomb games.

== History ==
Original Metacritic logo

Metacritic was launched in January 2001 by Marc Doyle, his sister Julie Doyle Roberts, and his University of Southern California law classmate Jason Dietz, after two years of developing the site. Rotten Tomatoes was already compiling movie reviews, but Doyle, Roberts, and Dietz saw an opportunity to cover a broader range of media.

Metacritic was sold to CNET in 2005. CNET and Metacritic were later acquired by the CBS Corporation. In 2020, Metacritic and other CNET titles were bought by Red Ventures. In 2022, Red Ventures sold Metacritic and other entertainment websites to Fandom, Inc.

=== Influence ===
Metacritic has been used by businesses to predict future sales. In 2007, Nick Wingfield of The Wall Street Journal wrote that Metacritic "influence[s] the sales of games and the stocks of video game publishers". He explains its influence as coming from the higher cost of buying video games than music or movie tickets. Many executives say that low scores "can hurt the long-term sales potential". Wingfield wrote that Wall Street pays attention to Metacritic and GameRankings because the sites typically post scores before sales data are publicly available, citing the respective rapid rise and fall in company values after BioShock and Spider-Man 3 were released. In an interview with The Guardian, Marc Doyle cited two major publishers that "conducted comprehensive statistical surveys through which they've been able to draw a correlation between high metascores and stronger sales" in certain genres. He claimed that an increasing number of businesses and financial analysts use Metacritic as "an early indicator of a game's potential sales and, by extension, the publisher's stock price". However, a 2015 study analyzing over 88 Xbox 360 and 80 PS3 games from 2012 found that Metacritic scores did not impact actual sales.

Controversially, the website has been used by game publishers as a means of determining whether a game's developer receives additional royalties. One notable example is the 2010 game Fallout: New Vegas, which received an average Metascore of 84, one short of the 85 points required by Bethesda Softworks, the game's publisher. As a result, its developer, Obsidian Entertainment, received no additional bonus. Outlets took issue with the company's use of Metacritic, with one suggesting that this makes game critics ultimately accountable for deciding the developer's profits and another pointing out that a Metascore of 84 is not significantly lower than 85. The latter also pointed out the impressive sales of five million sold units and US$300 million in revenue, and also noted a series of Obsidian's layoffs in 2011 and 2012.

The website has also been used by outlets and commentators as a general reference for critical reception, and by publishers as a tool of improving their products. Along with other executives, in 2008, John Riccitiello, then CEO of Electronic Arts, showed Wall Street analysts a chart illustrating a downward trend in the average critical ratings of the company's games. He took the ratings seriously and stressed the need for the company to bounce back. Also in 2008, Microsoft used Metacritic averages to delist underperforming Xbox Live Arcade games.

== Metascores ==
Metacritic scores for Pokémon Sword

Scores are weighted averages. Certain publications are given more significance "because of their stature". Metacritic has said that it will not reveal the relative weight assigned to each reviewer.

Games Editor Marc Doyle was interviewed in 2008 by Keith Stuart of The Guardian to "get a look behind the metascoring process". Stuart wrote: "The Metascore phenomenon, namely Metacritic and GameRankings, have become an enormously important element of online games journalism over the past few years". Doyle said that because video games lead to a greater investment of time and money, gamers are more informed about reviews than are fans of film or music; they want to know "whether that hotly anticipated title is going to deliver".

Score index
Indication	Video games	Films, television, and music
Universal acclaim	90–100	81–100
Generally favorable	75–89	61–80
Mixed or average	50–74	40–60
Generally unfavorable	20–49	20–39
Overwhelming dislike	0–19	

In June 2018, Metacritic established the "Must-See" label for a movie that "achieves a Metascore of 81 or higher and has been reviewed by a minimum of 15 professional critics". In September 2018, it added the "Must-Play" certification for video games attaining a score of 90% or more, and a minimum number of 15 reviews from industry professionals.

== Reception ==
Metacritic's efficacy has been analyzed by critics, outlets, and commentators, finding it to be generally useful or unreliable and biased. The website won two annual Webby Awards for excellence in the "Guides/Ratings/Reviews" category, in 2010 and 2015.

=== Criticism ===
Metacritic has been criticized for converting all scoring systems into a single quantitative percentage-based scale. For example, an "A" score equates to the value of 100, an "F" the value of zero, and a "B−" the value of 67. Joe Dodson, former editor at GameRevolution, criticized Metacritic and similar sites for turning reviews into scores that he found to be too low. Doyle defended the grading system, believing that every scale should be converted directly to that of the website, with its lowest possible score being 0 and the highest 100. Further criticism was directed to the website's refusal to publicize how it aggregates scores.

According to Doyle, publishers often try to persuade him to exclude reviews they feel are unfair, but he said that once a publication is included, he refuses to omit any of its reviews. A Washington Post review of Uncharted 4 was assigned with a rating of 40/100 by Metacritic; this was the only negative review of the game. Readers who disapproved of the review petitioned Metacritic to remove the Post as a trusted source. Similarly, Metacritic does not publish updated review scores, stating that they found "many publications had been pressured to raise review scores (or de-publish reviews) to satisfy outside influences". Video game designer Raphaël Colantonio criticized this policy on the basis that a game's technical issues that affected reviews could be patched and review scores updated accordingly by publications, while its Metacritic score would not change; he felt this was misleading and encouraged developers to make "safe boring games".

As a result of its perceived negative influence on the industry, several reviewing sites, including Kotaku and Eurogamer, have dropped numerical reviews that would appear in Metacritic, instead favoring a qualitative assessment of a game. Kotaku also highlighted the aforementioned practice used by some publishers who use Metacritic scores as a way to leverage more favorable terms for the publisher, or deny developers bonuses should they not reach a certain score. Doyle countered this by saying "Metacritic has absolutely nothing to do with how the industry uses our numbers. Metacritic has always been about educating the gamer. We're using product reviews as a tool to help them make the most of their time and money."

Critics and developers have pointed out that a product can suffer from rating manipulation by users through review bombing, sometimes by throwaway accounts. Signal Studios president and creative director Douglas Albright described the website as having no standards, following a review bombing of one of their games. In July 2020, Metacritic added a 36-hour waiting period for user reviews to be posted for video games at launch in an effort to reduce review-bombing.

== See also ==
- Internet Movie Database (IMDb)
- Rating site
- OpenCritic
