= Red Ventures =

American media company

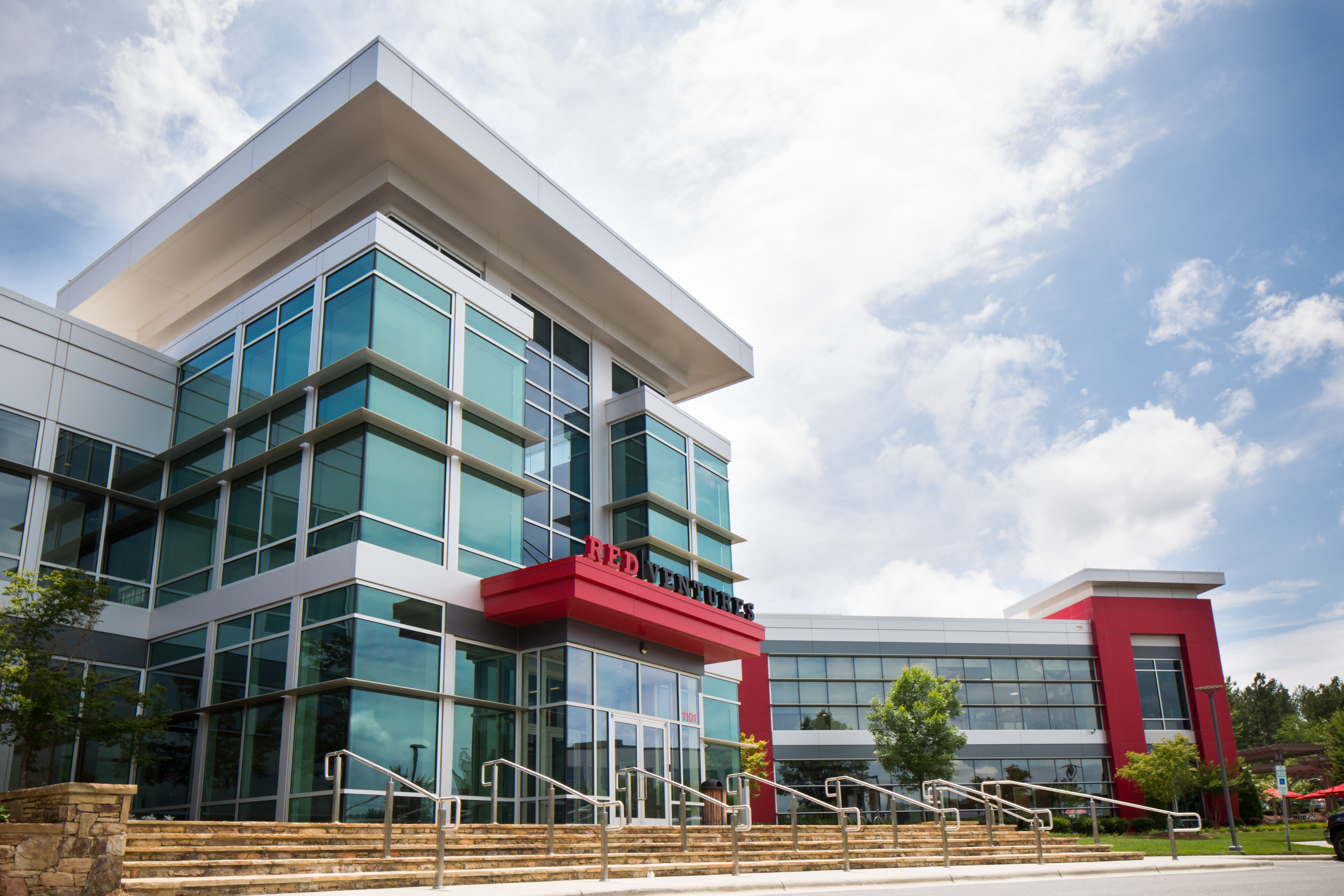
- Red Ventures headquarters in Indian Land, South Carolina
- Formerly: Red F (1999–2003)
- Type: Private
- Industry: Mass media; Marketing
- Founded: 2000; 26 years ago
- Headquarters: Indian Land, South Carolina, U.S. (Fort Mill mailing address)
- Key people: Ric Elias (CEO)
- Services: Marketing, advertising
- Revenue: US$2 billion (2021)
- Divisions: Healthline Media
- Subsidiaries: Bankrate; Uswitch
- Website: redventures.com

Red Ventures is an American media company that owns and operates brands such as Lonely Planet, The Points Guy, Healthline, and Bankrate. Red Ventures focuses on news, advice, and review websites. The company's corporate headquarters is located in Indian Land, South Carolina, a suburb of Charlotte, North Carolina.

== History ==
Red Ventures was founded as Red F on September 29, 1999, in Fort Mill, South Carolina, by Ric Elias and Dan Feldstein. In 2003, it was launched as Red Ventures, beginning with DIRECTV (DirectstarTV brand). It acquired Modern Consumer in 2008. In 2010, General Atlantic invested in Red Ventures, and its managing director Anton Levy joined the board of directors. They acquired homeinsurance.com in 2012, which included a satellite office in Wilmington, North Carolina.

In 2015, the company got a $250 million investment from Silver Lake. That same year, it doubled the size of its headquarters and bought postal services company Imagitas from Pitney Bowes for $310 million. The acquisition was in large part due to Imagitas' exclusive 10 year partnership with USPS to facilitate the official Change of Address process, which roughly 40 million people used each year.

Red Ventures acquired Soda.com in 2016. In 2017, it acquired several companies including Choose Energy, Allconnect and Bankrate, Inc. (including The Points Guy). Bankrate was acquired for $1.24 billion in cash in a deal announced July 3, 2017. HigherEducation.com and Healthline were acquired in 2019.

By 2020, the company had grown into an international presence with more than 100 brands, 3,000 employees, and operations in the United Kingdom and Brazil. On September 14, 2020, Red Ventures agreed to purchase the CNET Media Group from ViacomCBS for $500 million. This gave the company ownership of publications including GameSpot, Metacritic, TV Guide, Chowhound, GameFAQs, Giant Bomb, Cord Cutters News, Comic Vine, and ZDNET. On December 1, 2020, Red Ventures bought Lonely Planet from Tennessee-based NC2 Media for an undisclosed amount.

In 2021, the company had 4,500 employees and 751 million readers per month. It acquired Healthgrades.com from Mercury Healthcare for an undisclosed amount. It closed Chowhound that year. In 2022, the company sold the websites GameSpot, Metacritic, TV Guide, GameFAQs, Giant Bomb, Comic Vine and Cord Cutters to Fandom, Inc. That year, it partnered with UnitedHealth Group's Optum Health to launch RVO Health.

In May 2023, Red Ventures agreed to pay the United States $2.75 million to resolve a whistleblower's allegations that they violated the False Claims Act by underpaying on contracts connected to the USPS change-of-address process.

On August 6, 2024, The New York Times reported that Red Ventures was selling the CNET Media Group for $100 million to Ziff Davis, with the deal expected to close in the third quarter of 2024.

== Business model ==
In 2023, The Verge described the business model of the company as "publish[ing] content designed to rank highly in Google search for "high-intent" queries and ... monet[izing] that traffic with lucrative affiliate links". Stories are aimed at people who are likely to buy something ("high-intent"), with a particular focus on financial content such as credit cards, as the media company gets payments in the hundreds of dollars for each customer that buys a credit card. Red Ventures also aims to get paid for guiding readers to buy drugs and medical consultations.

The characterization came after the website Futurism found several articles published by Red Ventures properties, including CNET, were quietly written by artificial intelligence software, with the stories containing numerous inaccuracies and instances of plagiarism. Red Ventures announced layoffs at CNET a few weeks after the reports from The Verge and Futurism, which the company says were unrelated.

Futurism additionally highlighted undisclosed AI-generated, SEO-focused content produced by Red Ventures's education division (internally RV EDU). This content promotes schools with which Red Ventures maintains affiliate agreements, such as University of Phoenix (a for-profit college owned by Apollo Global Management) and Liberty University (founded by conservative activist and Baptist pastor Jerry Falwell). Websites operated by RV EDU include BestColleges.com, TheBestSchools.org, NurseJournal.org, ComputerScience.org, and Psychology.org, "as well as numerous sites with domain names that imply they're nonprofits".

In July 2023, Elias announced that AI-generated content, both editorial content and targeted advertisements, would be a major part of the company's business model moving forward.

Following CNET publishing AI-generated stories containing errors and plagiarized content, as well as incorrect attributions to human writers, the Wikipedia community downgraded CNET's reliability, such that all content since the Red Ventures acquisition should not be considered reliable. Employees unionized in response to layoffs and the risk to their professional reputations. Red Ventures subsequently attempted to sell CNET for $250 million; the approximate halving of CNET's value under Red Ventures' ownership is attributed to interest rates, a slower ad market, and potential buyers expressing concern at the reputational damage of the AI scandals.
