= CNET =

American media website about technology

- Company type: Subsidiary
- Website type: Technology, news
- Available in: English, French, Japanese
- Creators: Halsey Minor; Shelby Bonnie
- Editors: Lindsey Turrentine; Connie Guglielmo
- Industry: Journalism
- Parent: CBS Interactive (2008–2020); Red Ventures (2020–2024); Ziff Davis (2024–present)
- Website: cnet.com
- Commercial: Yes
- Registration: Optional
- Launched: 1992; 34 years ago (CNET, Inc.); June 1995; 31 years ago (website)
- Current status: Online

CNET (short for Computer Network) is an American media website that publishes reviews, news, articles, blogs, podcasts, and videos on technology and consumer electronics globally. CNET originally produced content for radio and television in addition to its website before applying new media distribution methods through its internet television network, CNET Video, and its podcast and blog networks.

Founded in 1992 by Halsey Minor and Shelby Bonnie, it was the flagship brand of CNET Networks and became a brand of CBS Interactive through that unit's acquisition of CNET Networks in 2008. Following acquisition by Red Ventures on October 30, 2020, the website faced criticism for what was described as a decline in quality of its editorial content and factual reliability due to the use of generative AI in the creation of its articles, as well as concerns over its journalistic integrity regarding increased publication of slanted reviews and sponsored content to benefit its advertising partners. On October 1, 2024, CNET was acquired by Ziff Davis.

== History ==
=== Origins ===
Logo of CNET Networks prior to acquisition by CBS Interactive

Former stylized c|net logo from 1994 to 2008 and 2011 to 2022

After leaving PepsiCo, Halsey Minor and Shelby Bonnie launched c/net, a 24-hour cable network about computers and technology in 1992. With help from Fox Network co-founder Kevin Wendle and former Disney creative associate Dan Baker, CNET produced four pilot television programs about computers, technology, and the Internet. CNET TV was composed of CNET Central, The Web, and The New Edge. CNET Central was created first and aired in syndication in the United States on USA Network. Later, it began airing on USA's sister network Sci-Fi Channel along with The Web and The New Edge. These were later followed by TV.com in 1996. Media personality Ryan Seacrest first came to national prominence at CNET, as the host of The New Edge and doing various voice-over work for CNET.

CNET online launched in June 1995. CNET, Inc., the site's owner, had its initial public offering (IPO) in July 1996, trading on the NASDAQ National Market as "CNWK". In 1998, CNET, Inc. was sued by Snap Technologies, operators of the education service CollegeEdge, for trademark infringement relating to CNET, Inc.'s ownership of the domain name Snap.com, due to Snap Technologies already owning a trademark on its name.

CNET produced another television technology news program called News.com that aired on CNBC beginning in 1999. From 2001 to 2003, it operated CNET Radio on the Clear Channel-owned KNEW (910) in the San Francisco Bay Area, WBPS (890) in Boston, and XM Satellite Radio. CNET Radio offered technology-themed programming. After failing to attract a sufficient audience, CNET Radio ceased operating in January 2003 due to financial losses.

=== Acquisitions and expansions ===
In July 1999, CNET, Inc. acquired the Swiss-based company GDT, later renamed to CNET Channel. In 1998, CNET, Inc. granted the right to Asiacontent.com to set up CNET Asia and the operation was brought back in December 2000. In January 2000, the same time CNET, Inc. became CNET Networks, it acquired comparison shopping site mySimon for $736 million. In October 2000, CNET Networks acquired ZDNET for approximately $1.6 billion. In January 2001, Ziff Davis reached an agreement with CNET Networks to regain the URLs lost in the 2000 sale of Ziff Davis to SoftBank, a publicly traded Japanese media and technology company. In April 2001, CNET acquired TechRepublic, which provides content for IT professionals from Gartner, for $23 million in cash and stock. In May 2002, CNET Networks acquired Smartshop, an automated product catalog and feature comparison technology company, for an undisclosed amount.

On July 14, 2004, CNET Networks announced that it would acquire photography website Webshots for $70 million ($60 million in cash, $10 million in deferred consideration), completing the acquisition that same month. In October 2007, it sold Webshots to American Greetings for $45 million. In August 2005, CNET Networks acquired Metacritic, a review aggregation website, for an undisclosed amount.

In 2005, Google representatives refused to be interviewed by all CNET reporters for a year after CNET published Google's CEO Eric Schmidt's salary and named the neighborhood where he lives, as well as some of his hobbies and political donations. All the information had been gleaned from Google searches.

In September 2006, CNET acquired Chowhound, an online food community.

On October 10, 2006, Shelby Bonnie resigned as chairman and CEO, in addition to two other executives, as a result of a stock options backdating scandal that occurred between 1996 and 2003. This would also cause the firm to restate its financial earnings over 1996 to 2003 for over $105 million in resulting expenses. The Securities and Exchange Commission later dropped an investigation into the practice. Neil Ashe was named as the new CEO.

In December 2006, James Kim, an editor at CNET, died in the Oregon wilderness. CNET hosted a memorial show and podcasts dedicated to him.

On March 1, 2007, CNET announced the public launch of BNET, a website targeted towards business managers. BNET had been running under beta status since 2005. In 2008 programmer Chris Wanstrath, who worked on GameSpot and Chowhound, left CNET to start GitHub.

=== CBS Corporation ownership ===
On May 15, 2008, it was announced that CBS Corporation would buy CNET Networks for US$ 1.8 billion. On June 30, 2008, the acquisition was completed. Former CNET Networks properties were managed under CBS Interactive at the time. CBS Interactive acquired many domain names originally created by CNET Networks, including download.com, downloads.com, upload.com, news.com, search.com, TV.com, mp3.com, chat.com, computers.com, shopper.com, com.com, and cnet.com. It also held radio.com until CBS Radio was sold to Entercom in 2017.

In 2011, CNET and CBS Interactive were sued by a coalition of artists (led by FilmOn founder Alki David) for copyright infringement by promoting the download of LimeWire, a popular peer to peer downloading software. Although the original suit was voluntarily dropped by Alki David, he vowed to sue at a later date to bring "expanded" action against CBS Interactive. In November 2011, another lawsuit against CBS Interactive was introduced, claiming that CNET and CBS Interactive knowingly distributed LimeWire.

On September 19, 2013, CBS Interactive launched a Spanish language sister site under the name CNET en Español. It focuses on topics of relevance primarily to Spanish-speaking technology enthusiasts. The site offered a "new perspective" on technology and is under the leadership of managing editor Gabriel Sama. The site not only offered news and tutorials, but also had a robust reviews section that it was led by Juan Garzon. After Red Ventures' acquisition, the company announced the closing of CNET en Español on November 11, 2020, leaving the largest tech site in Spanish in the US out of the market.

In March 2014, CNET refreshed its site by merging with CNET UK and vowing to merge all editions of the agency into a unified agency. This merge brought many changes, foremost of which would be a new user interface and the renaming of CNET TV as CNET Video.

=== Red Ventures ownership ===
Red Ventures announced in September 2020 that it would acquire CNET from ViacomCBS for $500 million. The transaction was completed on October 30, 2020.

In November 2022, CNET began publishing articles written with artificial intelligence and edited by humans. CNET was criticized for failing to disclose that it was using a machine to write articles, and for using human bylines on some AI-generated content until caught by independent investigators. CNET reviewed those articles in January 2023 after many were found to contain serious errors and plagiarized material. CNET reporters said Red Ventures pushed them to give more favourable coverage to advertisers and work on sponsored content. Subsequently, 10% of CNET staff were laid off. Employees unionized in response to the scandal and layoffs, saying AI-generated content posed a danger to their professional reputations. A former staffer demanded that her byline be removed from the site, in order to protect her reputation if her articles were revised by AI.

In August 2023, CNET had deleted thousands of old articles from their website in an effort to raise the search engine optimization rankings on Google Search. Before an article is deleted on its website, CNET creates an internal copy and another to Wayback Machine. The writer, if still employed by CNET, is also alerted 10 days in advance. Google said deleting articles to optimize for search engine rankings is not a good practice.

In January 2024, Axios reported that Red Ventures was exploring a sale of the website, with a goal of attaining at least $250 million for it. The site was profitable at the time. The approximate halving of CNET's value under Red Ventures' ownership is attributed to interest rates, a slower ad market, and the reputational damage to CNET caused by the AI scandals.

On August 6, 2024, the New York Times reported that Red Ventures had reached an agreement to sell CNET to Ziff Davis for $100 million, subject to regulatory approval. The acquisition was completed in the third quarter of 2024.

== Websites ==
=== CNET Networks ===
- CNET.com, CNET Taiwan, CNET.co.uk, CNET Channel, CNET.de, CNET AU, CNET Asia, CNET Japan, CNET Gadget
- ZDNet.com, ZDNet UK, ZDNet AU, ZDNet.fr, ZDNet DE, ZDNet China, ZDNet Korea
- TechRepublic (2001–2021)
  - Silicon.com (2002–2012)
- atlarge.com (2006–2012)
- mySimon.com (2008–2020)
- GameSpot (2000–2022)
- Webshots (2004–2007)
- Chowhound (2006–2022)
- MP3.com (2003–2020)
- News.com
- Download.com
- Builder

France websites:

- businessMOBILE.fr
- News.fr
- Gamekult (2007–2014)
- Arts-Culinaires.com
- Recettes-de-Cuisine.com
- Cuisine-Noel.com
- MusicSPOT.fr

Japan websites:

- GameSpot Japan
- Tetsudo.com

=== Gamecenter ===
CNET launched a website to cover video games, CNET Gamecenter, in the middle of 1996. According to the San Francisco Chronicle, it was "one of the first Web sites devoted to computer gaming news". It became a leading game-focused website; in 1999, PC Magazine named it one of the hundred-best websites in any field, alongside competitors IGN and GameSpot. According to Gamecenter head Michael Brown, the site received between 50,000 and 75,000 daily visitors by late 2000. In May 2000, CNET founded the Gamecenter Alliance network to bring Gamecenter and four partner websites, including Inside Mac Games, under one banner. Nielsen//NetRatings ranked Gamecenter the sixth-most-popular gaming website in the United States by mid-2000.

On July 19, 2000, CNET, Inc. made public its plan to buy Ziff-Davis and its ZDNet Internet business for $1.6 billion. Because ZDNet had partnered with SpotMedia—parent company of GameSpot—in late 1996, the acquisition brought both GameSpot and Gamecenter under CNET, Inc.'s ownership. Later that year, The New York Times described the two publications as the "Time and Newsweek of gaming sites". The paper reported that Gamecenter "seem[ed] to be thriving" amid the dot-com crash, with its revenue distributed across online advertising and an affiliate sales program with CNET's Game Shopper website, launched in late 1999.

Following an almost $400 million loss at CNET as a result of the dot-com crash, the company ended the Gamecenter Alliance network in January 2001. On February 7, Gamecenter itself was closed in a redundancy reduction effort, as GameSpot was the more successful of the two sites. Around 190 jobs were cut from CNET during this period, including "at least 20" at Gamecenter, according to the San Francisco Chronicle. Discussing the situation, Tom Bramwell of Eurogamer reported, "It is thought [...] that very few if any of the website's staff will move sideways into jobs at GameSpot, now the company's other gaming asset." The Washington Post later noted that Gamecenter was among the "popular video-game news sites" to close in 2001, alongside Daily Radar.

== Criticism ==
=== Hopper controversy ===
In January 2013, CNET named Dish Network's "Hopper with Sling" digital video recorder as a nominee for the CES "Best in Show" award (which is decided by CNET on behalf of its organizers), and named it the winner in a vote by the site's staff. However, CBS abruptly disqualified the Hopper, and vetoed the results because the company was in active litigation with Dish Network. CNET also announced that it could no longer review any product or service provided by companies that CBS are in litigation with (which also includes Aereo). The new vote subsequently gave the Best in Show award to the Razer Edge tablet instead.

Dish Network's CEO Joe Clayton said that the company was "saddened that CNET's staff is being denied its editorial independence because of CBS' heavy-handed tactics." On January 14, 2013, editor-in-chief Lindsey Turrentine addressed the situation, stating that CNET's staff were in an "impossible" situation due to the conflict of interest posed by the situation, and promised that she would do everything within her power to prevent a similar incident from occurring again. The conflict also prompted one CNET senior writer, Greg Sandoval, to resign.

The decision also drew the ire of staff from the Consumer Electronics Association, the organizers of CES; CEO Gary J. Shapiro criticized the decision in a USA Today op-ed column and a statement by the CEA, stating that "making television easier to watch is not against the law. It is simply pro-innovation and pro-consumer." Shapiro felt that the decision also hurt the confidence of CNET's readers and staff, "destroying its reputation for editorial integrity in an attempt to eliminate a new market competitor." As a result of the controversy and fearing damage to the show's brand, the CEA announced on January 31, 2013, that CNET will no longer decide the CES Best in Show award winner due to the interference of CBS (the position has been offered to other technology publications), and the "Best in Show" award was jointly awarded to both the Hopper with Sling and Razer Edge.

=== Malware in downloads ===
With a catalog of more than 400,000 titles, the Downloads section of the website allows users to download popular software. CNET's download.com provides Windows, Macintosh, and mobile software for download. CNET claims that this software is free of spyware, but independent sources have confirmed that this is not the case. While Download.com is overall a safe place to download programs, precautions should be taken before downloading from the site, as some downloads do contain malware.

=== AI-generated content (2023) ===
In January 2023, Wikipedia editors began the process of downgrading CNET's reliability rating as a source following the revelation that CNET was publishing content generated by artificial intelligence. In response to the decision, CNET claimed it maintained high editorial standards, stating, "It is important to clarify that CNET is not actively using AI to create new content. While we have no specific plans to restart, any future initiatives would follow our public AI policy."

== See also ==
- ZDNet
- TechCrunch
- TechRadar
- Wired
