= Interlining =

Type of airline practice

Interlining, also known as interline ticketing and interline booking, is a voluntary commercial agreement between individual airlines to handle passengers traveling on itineraries that require multiple flights on multiple airlines. Such agreements allow passengers to change from one flight on one airline to another flight on another airline without having to gather their bags or check-in again. Airlines can also promise free rebooking if the connection is lost due to a delay.

Interlining agreements differ from codeshare agreements in that codeshare agreements usually refers to numbering a flight with the airline's code (abbreviation) even though the flight is operated by another airline. However, codeshare relationships can affect whether an interline ticket (or e-ticket) can be issued, since both the codeshare marketing carrier and codeshare operating carrier must have interline agreements with all other carriers in the itinerary to allow a single ticket to be issued.

Interline agreements are directional. For example, it may be possible for American Airlines to issue the ticket on an American-United itinerary, but United might not be able to be the issuer on the same itinerary. Such a one-directional interline agreement is called a unilateral interline. The airlines may also agree to enter a bilateral interline agreement, where each airline can issue the ticket on the other airline.

Previously, only large network carriers such as United Airlines and Lufthansa would have electronic ticket interline agreements, but the IATA mandate to eliminate paper tickets at the end of 2007 has changed this by forcing smaller carriers to implement electronic ticketing.

Smaller legacy carriers commonly have interline agreements with large network carriers that fly into their markets. Most newer low-cost airlines that only sell directly to consumers (and not through agencies or Global distribution systems) do not support interlining at all.

If no interline ticketing agreement exists, then two separate tickets will need to be issued, and passengers will have to retrieve their bags and carry it to the connecting airline for check-in. Itineraries with interline connections such as this are riskier for travelers, since the second carrier may be unaware of delays or issues with the incoming flight and is less likely to permit a rebooking without cost if the connection is lost. Due to yield management, purchase of new, short-notice tickets in the event of a lost connection is usually expensive. There can also be a problem if luggage is lost and the traveler wants it to be sent to them later.

Most online travel agencies will only display itineraries that can be ticketed on one of their booking systems. However, some ticket websites will sometimes display un-ticketable interline itineraries. Examples could be found previously on routes to Mexico involving the now defunct Aero California, or may be currently found on routes to Indonesia involving Lion Air. These are often displayed as "contact airline to buy".

Interlining agreements can allow routes to remain sustainable through partners operating smaller aircraft than the other airline partner can offer. New Zealand Associate Transport Minister James Meager said of the Air New Zealand – Air Chathams agreement that "interlining may be one of the solutions for some of the routes that are very difficult to operate," especially where, "if it's a small route where you can fill a 34-seat plane... but struggle to fill a 50-seat plane."

== Participating airlines ==
Carriers that participate in airline alliances such as Star Alliance, SkyTeam or Oneworld almost always have interline agreements with one another. However, even direct competitors can benefit from interline agreements.

When a ticket is issued for an interline itinerary, one of the airlines in that itinerary will be selected by the ticketing agent as the issuing airline, commonly referred to as the "plating carrier." The plating carrier collects the entire fare from the customer, either via own sales channels (e.g., web site or ticket office), or via travel agents. Travel agents remit collected fares and taxes to the plating carrier via Airlines Reporting Corporation (ARC) in the US, or Billing and Settlement Plan (BSP) in the rest of the world. The airline which actually carried the passenger (the operating airline) will send an invoice to the issuing/plating carrier, normally via IATA Clearing House, to collect its portion of the fare and taxes. The operating airline is responsible for remitting passenger taxes to the various governments and airports. Some taxes are sales based (US taxes), and are remitted by the issuing airline.

Only the issuing carrier is responsible for paying commission to the agency. The amount of commission is based on the entire air fare, but the percentage amount varies from the amount paid if only a single airline was involved.

Normal fare construction rules state that an international ticket issued should be issued by the first international carrier. There are some exceptions, such as if the first international is a codeshare flight, when the first non-codeshare would be used, or if an airline does not have an office in the country of origin.

Ferry and bus companies, such as TurboJET, can also participate in interlining by getting an IATA code for the operator and for the destinations they travel to, and produce schedules for their services.

Railway operators also participate in interlining with airlines. For example, ITA Airways maintains agreements with the Spanish Iryo and the Italian Trenitalia.

== Virtual interlining ==
Virtual interlining is a form of self-connecting travel in which flights from airlines without a traditional interline agreement are combined into one itinerary by a third party, such as an online travel agency. The flights may be sold together even though the airlines themselves do not coordinate the connection.

Unlike conventional interlining, virtual interlining may not include through check-in, baggage transfer or protection if a connection is missed. Passengers may therefore need to collect and re-check their baggage between flights. If a delay causes a missed connection, the operating airlines may not be required to rebook the passenger. Some booking platforms offer their own connection guarantees or other assistance.

Virtual interlining can create connections between airlines that otherwise have no commercial relationship, including many low-cost carriers. This can increase the number of available routes and sometimes lower fares. However, cheaper itineraries may involve longer connections or less direct routes.

=== Development and providers ===
Dohop was an early developer of technology for finding connections between airlines without interline agreements, but operating as a flight-search service that redirected users to airlines. In the early 2010s, Skypicker, later renamed Kiwi.com, developed a more consumer-focused model, selling self-connected flights directly and offering protection against missed connections.

Kiwi.com has since been credited with helping bring virtual interlining into wider use. While Dohop has focused more on B2B services, Kiwi.com has developed into an online travel agency selling such itineraries directly to travellers.
