= FIM =

FIM may refer to:

== Organizations and companies ==
- Fédération Internationale de Motocyclisme, the International Motorcycling Federation
- Flint Institute of Music, in Michigan, United States
- Fox Interactive Media, now News Corp. Digital Media
- Institute for Mathematical Research (German: Forschungsinstitut für Mathematik), at ETH Zurich
- Independent Moralizing Front (Spanish: Frente Independiente Moralizador), a defunct Peruvian political party
- International Federation of Musicians (French: Federation Internationale des Musiciens), a global union federation
- Italian Federation of Metal Mechanics (Italian: Federazione Italiana Metalmeccanici; abbreviated as FIM), Italian trade union

== Science and technology ==
- Facing Identification Mark, a bar code designed by the United States Postal Service
- Field ion microscope, used to image the arrangement of atoms
- File integrity monitoring, used to validate software files
- Fim switch, in E. coli
- Flood Inundation Map
- Flow-following, finite-volume Icosahedral Model, a numerical weather prediction model
- Focused impedance measurement
- Forefront Identity Manager, identity management software

== Other ==
- Finnish markka, the former currency of Finland
- First-in-man study, in medical clinical trials
- Fisher information matrix, in mathematical statistics
- Flight interruption manifest, a substitute airline ticket
- Functional Independence Measure, tool for assessing functional capacities of patients undergoing rehabilitation
- Friendship Is Magic aka My Little Pony: Friendship Is Magic, a 2010 animated series
- Free immersion apnea, a freediving discipline in which the freediver dives under water without the use of propulsion equipment
