= Hahn Air =

Hahn Air may refer to:

- Hahn Air Lines, a German airline
- Hahn Air Systems GmbH, a global consolidation service of travel and holiday companies

== See also ==
- Hahn Air Base
