= Oliver Dlouhý =

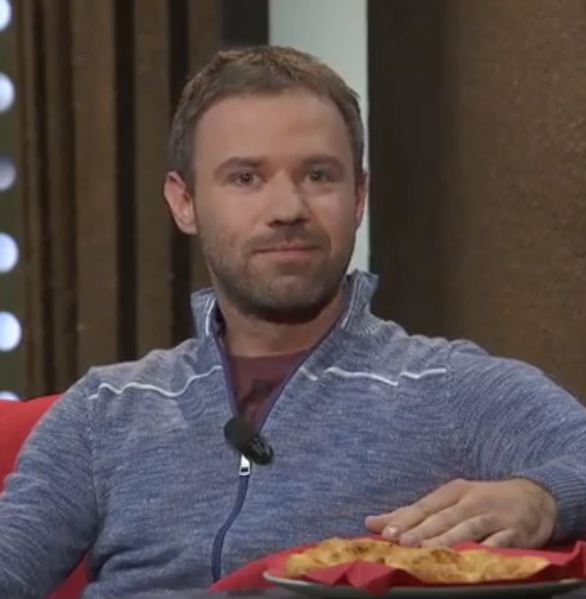
- Dlouhý on Show Jana Krause in 2016
- Born: January 7, 1988 (age 38); Prague, Czechoslovakia
- Education: Newton College (attended)
- Occupation: Entrepreneur
- Known for: Co-founding Kiwi.com
- Title: CEO of Kiwi.com

Oliver Dlouhý (born 7 January 1988) is a Czech entrepreneur, co-founder and CEO of the online travel company Kiwi.com. He co-founded the company in 2012 with programmer Jozef Képesi around the idea of algorithmically combining flights operated by airlines without interline agreements.

In 2019, the American investment firm General Atlantic acquired a majority stake in the company, while Dlouhý and Képesi retained significant shareholdings and continued in executive roles.

Dlouhý was selected for the Forbes 30 Under 30 Europe list in the technology category in 2018. In 2020, he was named EY Entrepreneur of the Year 2019 for the Czech Republic. In 2021, he became president of the Association for Applied Research in IT (AAVIT), an industry association supporting digitalisation of Czech public administration.

== Early life and education ==
Dlouhý was born in Prague on 7 January 1988 and grew up in Jindřichův Hradec. He studied informatics, economics, philosophy and business at several universities, but did not graduated.

Dlouhý began experimenting with business already at the secondary school, when he bought blueberries from local pickers and resold them near the Austrian border. Then he made and sold jukeboxes and traded electronic cigarettes.

While studying in Brno, Dlouhý formed a business idea after spending days searching for inexpensive flights for himself. He realized that there is a business case for combining flights operated by airlines that did not cooperate through traditional interline arrangements.

== Kiwi.com ==
While developing the idea for an automated flight-combination service, Dlouhý met programmer Jozef Képesi, who subsequently became co-founder and CTO of SkyPicker. The company, founded in 2012, initially focused on combining low-cost flights. Entrepreneur and investor Jiří Hlavenka provided early financing and became the company's first investor.

SkyPicker subsequently expanded from a flight-search service into an online travel company. In May 2016, it was renamed Kiwi.com, as the company sought to expand its services beyond air travel. Dlouhý remained chief executive and one of its largest individual shareholders, while several other shareholders were considering selling their stakes.

In June 2019, the American investment firm General Atlantic acquired a majority stake in Kiwi.com. Several investors sold their holdings, while Dlouhý, Képesi and programmer Luboš Charčenko retained their stake.

The COVID-19 pandemic severely affected Kiwi.com's business as international air travel collapsed and large numbers of flights were cancelled. The company faced criticism from customers over delayed refunds and communication, while Dlouhý attributed the delays to difficulties recovering money from airlines.

In 2025, he described a restructuring of Kiwi.com's business model aimed at increasing cooperation with airlines.

== Other ventures and investments ==
Dlouhý has invested in several Czech technology startups, such as games platform Fireball. In 2017, he and Jiří Hlavenka invested in the bikesharing startup Futupilot.

In 2026, Dlouhý invested in the restoration and operation of a historic brewery in Jindřichův Hradec. The brewery resumed production under the Jindra brand.

== Personal life ==
Dlouhý's paternal half-brothers are famous Czech actors Michal Dlouhý and Vladimír Dlouhý.

== See also ==
- Kiwi.com
- Deloitte Fast 500
