= InsWeb =

InsWeb Corporation
- Type: Public
- Traded as: Nasdaq: PTNT
- Industry: Insurance
- Founded: 1995
- Founders: Hussein A. Enan and Darrell Ticehurst
- Defunct: 2016
- Fate: Acquired and absorbed
- Successor: Bankrate and Internet Patents Corp
- Headquarters: Gold River, California, United States
- Products: Insurance Marketplace
- Number of employees: Approx. 80 (2011)
- Parent: Bankrate
- Website: www.insweb.com at the Wayback Machine (archived March 17, 2016)

InsWeb Corporation was an American insurance comparison company that operated from 1995 until 2016. The company had operated an online insurance marketplace designed to allow consumers to compare insurance products and rate quotes from a variety of providers.

InsWeb did not provide insurance directly. The company connected consumers with multiple providers via a proprietary online technology platform. Customers received price quotes for the various insurance products they choose and were contacted by outside insurance agents and/or companies to continue the purchasing process. In conjunction with the consumer-facing insurance quote system, they also operated a lead generating site as a marketing source for insurance agents.

== History ==
InsWeb was founded in 1995 by Hussein A. Enan and Darrell Ticehurst and became a publicly traded company in 1999. As of its IPO date it was the exclusive provider of auto insurance quotes on the Yahoo! internet portal.

In 2011, the primary business was sold to Bankrate. The unpurchased assets became the Internet Patents Corp which then changed its name to Prism Technologies.

== Recognitions ==
InsWeb had been recognized by several prominent publications since its founding, this included:

- Kiplinger (2009) "Best Auto Insurance Website"
- Kiplinger (2008) "Best Auto Insurance Website"
- Kiplinger (2007) "Best Auto Insurance Website"
- Forbes (2007) "Best of the Web" and "Forbes' Favorite"
