= Martín Escobari =

Bolivian-American businessman

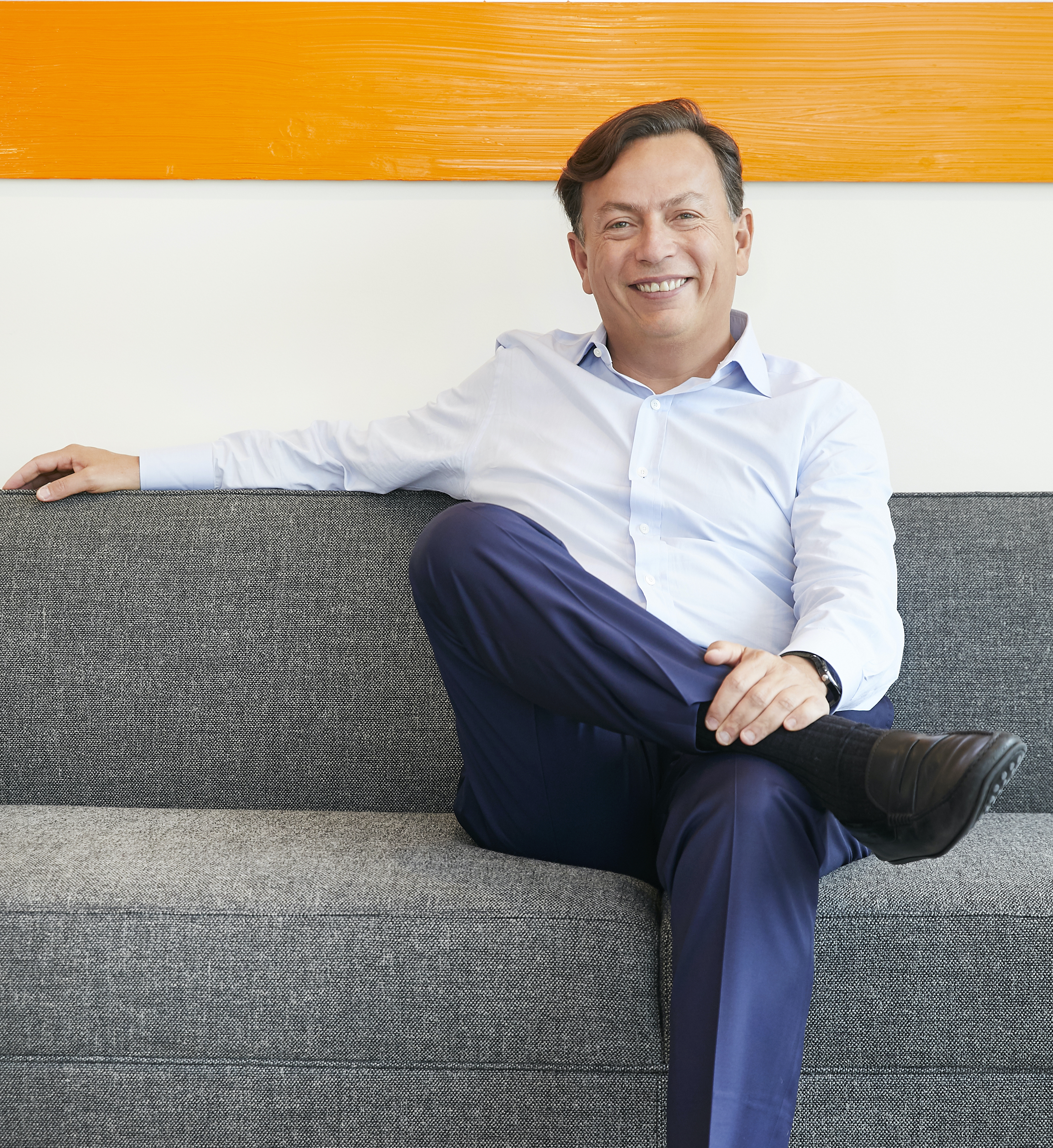
- Education: Harvard College (B.A.), Harvard Business School (M.B.A.)
- Occupations: Co-President, Head of Global Growth Equity, and Chairman of the Investment Committee at General Atlantic

Martín Escobari is co-president and managing director of global growth equity firm General Atlantic. Escobari is also head of global growth equity and chairs General Atlantic's global investment committee and leads its business in Latin America.

== Early life and education ==
Escobari was born in Bolivia, immigrated to Brazil and later relocated to the United States. He earned a B.A. in Economics from Harvard College and an M.B.A. from Harvard Business School where he graduated as a Baker Scholar.

== Career ==
Escobari began his career as an associate at the Boston Consulting Group in New York, later joining private equity firm GP Investments as an investment officer. He co-founded Submarino.com, a Brazilian online retailer in 1999, and served in various roles including as its chief financial officer from 2004 to 2007.

As CFO of Submarino.com, Escobari led the company's financial strategy and corporate development. In 2005 and 2006, he led the company's expansion into financial products, travel and ticketing via acquisitions and new product launches.

Submarino.com was taken public in 2005 and then sold to Lojas Americanas in 2006. The following year, Escobari was hired by Advent International where he worked as a managing director, primarily in the financial services sector. Escobari led Advent's successful investment in CETIP, Brazil's fixed income exchange.

Escobari joined General Atlantic in 2012 as a managing director and head of Latin America, based out of the firm's São Paulo office. During his tenure in the region, General Atlantic made some of its most profitable investments in Brazil and continues to expand its operations in Latin America today. Such growth has been driven by investments in companies like XP Inc., Arco, D-Local, Hotmart, Quinto Andar, Clip, Kavak and Justo.

In January 2017, Escobari was appointed chairman of General Atlantic's global investment committee and relocated to New York. In November 2019, General Atlantic announced that Escobari would join Anton Levy and Gabriel Caillaux as co-presidents of the firm, effective January 1, 2020. He also serves on the firm's management and portfolio committees and supervises the firm's Growth Acceleration team.

== Philanthropy and public positions ==
Escobari is a member of the boards of the Lincoln Center and Brazilian educational charity Primeira Chance. He serves as a mentor and global ambassador for Endeavor and is a member of the David Rockefeller Center for Latin American Studies Brazil Advisory Group at Harvard University.

== Corporate board memberships ==
=== Current ===
- XP Inc.
- D-Local
- Arco
- Grupo Axo
- Pague Menos
- Sanfer
- Kavak
- Jüsto

== Publications ==
Escobari co-authored Sucesso Made in Brasil, covering Brazil's notable companies that thrived in the turbulent 1990s, as well as articles in Harvard Business Review Latin America, Harvard Strategy and Innovation and Sloan's Business Strategy Review. Escobari was profiled in Fora da Curva 2 and The Future of Private Equity, and was also mentioned in the Harvard Business School Case Study on XP Inc.
