= Electronic ticket =

Digital ticket

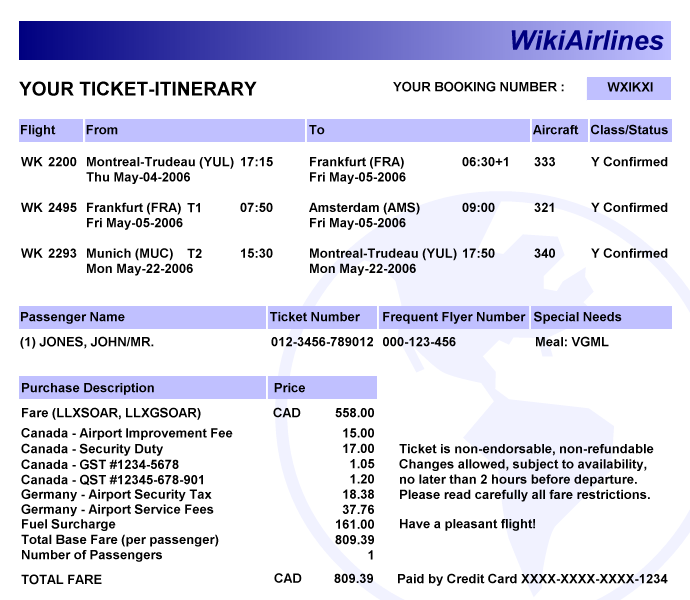
A sample itinerary for an open jaw electronic ticket from Montreal to Amsterdam, and returning from Munich

An electronic ticket is a method of ticket entry, processing, and marketing for companies in the airline, railways and other transport and entertainment industries.

== Airline ticket ==
E-tickets in the airline industry were devised in about 1994, and have now largely replaced the older multi-layered paper ticketing systems. Since 1 June 2008, it has been mandatory for IATA members to use e-ticketing. Where paper tickets are still available, some airlines charge a fee for issuing paper tickets.

When a reservation is confirmed, the airline keeps a record of the booking in its computer reservations system. Customers can print out or may be provided with a copy of a e-ticket itinerary receipt which contains the record locator or reservation number and the e-ticket number. It is possible to print multiple copies of an e-ticket itinerary receipt.

Besides providing itinerary details, an e-ticket itinerary receipt also contains:

- An official ticket number (including the airline's 3-digit ticketing code, a 4-digit form number, a 6-digit serial number, and sometimes a check digit)
- Carriage terms and conditions (or at least a reference to them)
- Fare and tax details, including fare calculation details and some additional data such as tour codes. The exact cost might not be stated, but a "fare basis" code will always identify the fare used.
- A short summary of fare restrictions, usually specifying only whether change or refund are permitted but not the penalties to which they are subject
- Form of payment
- Issuing office
- Baggage allowance

=== Checking in with an e-ticket ===
Passengers with e-tickets are required to check-in at the airport for a flight in the usual manner, except that they may be required to present an e-ticket itinerary receipt or personal identification, such as a passport, or credit card. They can also use the record locator, often called booking reference, a code of six letters and digits. Producing a print-out of an e-ticket itinerary receipt may be required to enter the terminal of some airports or to satisfy immigration regulations in some countries.

The introduction of e-tickets has allowed for various enhancements to checking-in processes.

==== Self-service and remote check-in ====
- online/mobile/telephone/self-service kiosk check-in (if the airline makes this option available)
- early check-in
- printing boarding passes at airport kiosks and at locations other than an airport
- delivery of boarding pass bar-codes via SMS or email to a mobile device

Several websites assist people holding e-tickets to check in online in advance of the twenty-four-hour airline restriction. These sites store a passenger's flight information and then when the airline opens up for online check-in the data is transferred to the airline and the boarding pass is emailed back to the customer. With this e-ticket technology, if a passenger receives his boarding pass remotely and is travelling without check-in luggage, he may bypass traditional counter check-in.

The same provision also applies to airline ticket bookings made through online travel agencies (OTAs). The booking data are usually presented in the form of a barcode, which is scanned at the airport to obtain a physical ticket or boarding pass.

=== IATA mandated transition ===
As part of the IATA Simplifying the Business initiative, the association instituted a program to switch the industry to 100% electronic ticketing. The program concluded on June 1, 2008, with the association saying that the resulting industry savings were approximately US$3 billion.

In 2004 IATA Board of Governors set the end of 2007 as the deadline for airlines to make the transition to 100% electronic ticketing for tickets processed through the IATA billing and settlement plan; in June 2007, the deadline was extended to May 31, 2008.

As of June 1, 2008 paper tickets can no longer be issued on neutral stock by agencies reporting to their local BSP. Agents reporting to the ARC using company-provided stock or issuing tickets on behalf of an airline (GSAs and ticketing offices) are not subject to that restriction.

The industry was unable to comply with the IATA mandate and paper tickets remain in circulation as of February 2009.

== Train tickets ==
Amtrak started offering electronic tickets on all train routes on 30 July 2012. These tickets can be ordered over the internet and printed (as a PDF file), printed at a Quik-Trak kiosk, or at the ticket counter at the station. Electronic tickets can also be held in a smart phone and shown to the conductor using an app. Mobile tickets are common with operators of US commuter train networks (e.g. MTA LIRR and Metro North) but they are usually only offered on the US version of the App Store and only accept US-issued credit cards as the app's payment page asks the user for the credit card's ZIP code to complete the purchase.

Several European train operators also offer self-printable or downloadable tickets. Often tickets can also be delivered by SMS or MMS. Railway operators in other countries also issue electronic tickets. The national operators of Denmark and Netherlands have a nationwide system where RFID smartcards are used as train tickets. In the UK, the issuance of printable or mobile tickets is at the discretion of train operators and is often available for advance tickets only (i.e. valid only on a specific train). This is very common in Europe for local urban rail, such as rapid transit/metros. During the 2010s phone apps have been increasingly popular. Passengers do not have to visit a machine or a desk to buy a ticket or refill an RFID card, but can buy it in their phone.

In India, an SMS sent by the Indian Railways, along with a valid proof of identity is considered equivalent to a ticket and also a e-ticket pdf can be downloaded from the IRCTC website or mobile app.

== Sport, concert, and cinema tickets ==
Many sport, concert venues, and cinemas use electronic ticketing for their events. Electronic tickets, or "eTickets" as they are sometimes referred, are often delivered as PDFs or another downloadable format that can be received via email or through a mobile app. Electronic tickets allow organizers to avoid the cost of producing and distributing physical tickets by transferring costs to the customer, who must own electronic hardware and purchase internet access in order to receive their ticket.

A printed copy of these tickets or a digital copy on a mobile phone should be presented on coming to the venue. These tickets now normally also have a barcode, which may be scanned on entry into the venue to streamline crowd processing. Electronic tickets have become increasingly prevalent in the entertainment industry over the last decade.

In some cases, spectators who want to see a match may not need a printable electronic ticket. If someone with a membership to a football team books a ticket online, the member can just verify his/her reservation with a membership card at the entrance. This is common with teams in the English Premiership League.

== Implementations ==
In January 2017 it was reported that Germany's Federal Minister of Transport and Digital Infrastructure, Alexander Dobrindt wants to create an electronic ticket to connect public bus and train services as well as parking spaces and potentially car-sharing services across all cities. A nationwide electronic ticket system was introduced in Denmark in 2010, called Rejsekort.

In Bangalore Metro System, instead of paper tickets, NFC tokens were issued. But these didn't offer a lot of benefits over paper tickets other than that they could be used again.

Currently both Bangalore and Kochi Metro allow users to book tickets through WhatsApp. Once the payment is done online, the system will send a QR code as a message on WhatsApp, which the passengers can scan to pass through the turnstiles.

== See also ==
- Digital ticket
- Mobile ticketing
- Travel technology
- Flight interruption manifest
- Ticket system
