= Travelgenio =

Spanish online travel agency

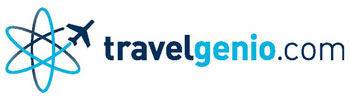
- Company type: Private
- Industry: Travel agency
- Founded: Spain (2010)
- Founder: Mariano Pelizzari
- Defunct: December 15, 2022
- Headquarters: Madrid, Spain
- Area served: Europe and Latin America
- Key people: Joost Schuring (CEO)
- Products: Flights, hotels, car rentals, travel insurance
- Revenue: €35 Million (2011) €90 Million (2012) €180 Million (2013) €344 Million (2014) €449 Million (2015) €700 Million (2016)
- Number of employees: 200
- Website: www.travelgenio.es (Spain)

Travelgenio was a Spanish online travel agency created in 2010 by the Argentinean entrepreneur Mariano Pelizzari. The company also published a survey of trends and customer satisfaction in the air travel industry.

In 2018, Travelgenio merged with the Dutch company Otravo, at the same time that Joost Schuring took over as CEO. In December 2022, Schuring announced the cessation of operations due to bankruptcy, without indemnifying for dismissal the employees of the Travelgenio subsidiary in Uruguay.

== Services ==
The products and services Travelgenio offers are, mainly, flights, hotels and other services such as insurances, car rental, and transfers. Travelgenio operates through some reservation systems like Amadeus CRS or Galileo, marketing the products of airlines like Iberia (airline), Vueling, Air France or KLM, among other companies. In 2020 Travelgenio and Travelport signed a renewed partnership.

== Bankruptcy and legal breaches ==
On December 15, 2022, Otravo, Travelgenio's parent company, announced its cessation of operations. Meanwhile, IATA announced the suspension of Otravo and Travelgenio from BSP. While employees in the Netherlands were dismissed from the company and received the corresponding severance pay, the employees of the Montevideo, Uruguay office were on unemployment insurance for inactivity between January 15 and April 28, 2023, when they were finally terminated from the company.

On May 12, 2023, Travelgenio went into administration in Spain and Uruguay, and the liquidation phase was started. On May 31, the company confirmed that it was going to compensate for dismissal its employees in Spain and even informed them that the return of the computer equipment that each employee had was not necessary. However, having demanded the return of the equipment from the Uruguayan employees and having already breached the legal deadlines, Travelgenio did not pay the severance package and nor did it report the amounts corresponding to each former employee (82 in total) from the South American country.

In addition to failing to pay the severance package, the employees have also not been able to collect unemployment insurance after the dismissal, due to the fact that the company took a long time to discharge its employees from BPS, the entity in charge of social security in Uruguay.
