= Validating carrier =

In the context of multi-leg flights, the validating carrier (a.k.a. issuing carrier) is the airline that validates or issues tickets, and the one that receives the money when the flights are booked. In the event of cancellations this is the carrier with which the flyer has credit. However, with the advent of online booking, passengers are usually unaware of who their validating carrier is. The only way to tell who the validating carrier is for a passenger to check the first three digits of his/her ticket number after booking the ticket. Airlines who are members of ARC or IATA BSP have their own prefix for airline tickets.

Examples of prefixes of several major airlines include:

== Asia Pacific ==
Airline	Prefix
Air China	999
SriLankan Airlines	603
All Nippon Airways	205
IndiGo	312
Qantas	098
Singapore Airlines	618

== Europe ==
Airline	Prefix
Air France	057
British Airways	125
Lufthansa	220
Ryanair	N/A
Air France	057
Turkish Airlines	235
Scandinavian Airline System SAS	117
Finn Air	105
LOT Polish Airlines	080
KLM Royal Dutch Airlines	074
Hahn Air	169
ITA Airways (ex Alitalia)	055
Iberia	060
TAP Air Portugal	047
Aegean Airlines	390
Virgin Atlantic	932

== North America ==
Airline	Prefix
American Airlines	001
Air Canada	014
Delta Air Lines	006
Southwest Airlines	526
United Airlines	016

== Near East ==
Airline	Prefix
El Al	114
