= Cariloop =

American healthcare company

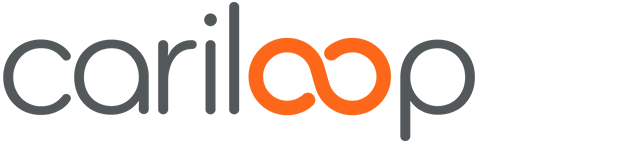
- Industry: Health
- Founded: July 2012; 13 years ago
- Founder: Michael Walsh; Steven Theesfeld
- Headquarters: Dallas, Texas, United States
- Website: cariloop.com

Cariloop is a health and wellness company based in Dallas, Texas. The company's Caregiver Support Platform pairs healthcare and education coaching services with a secure online case management portal to assist users in managing care coordination.

== Business ==
Cariloop users receive an online case file where documents are stored, accessed, and reviewed by users and healthcare coaches. The company's healthcare coaches are licensed or certified in fields such as nursing, social work, case management, therapy, and counseling. Healthcare coaches can assist users in creating caregiving plans, and can help find answers, resources, or contacts for medical, financial, and legal questions.

The company's business model focuses on employee benefits packages. Individual memberships are also offered.

== History ==
Cariloop, Inc. was founded in July 2012 by Michael Walsh and Steven Theesfeld. The company completed the Health Wildcatters accelerator program in 2013 and launched version one of its website in 2014. Version one of Cariloop.com was a search wizard that matched users with care providers based on pricing, location, type of care, and availability. The company's original business model was comparable to a referral service, similar to A Place for Mom. The company partnered with the Texas Organization of Residential Care Homes during the first version of its product.

The company shifted its focus from care providers to caregivers, which led to the launching of the second version of Cariloop.com in August 2015. The second platform included healthcare coaching services and a digital case management portal.

== Funding ==
Cariloop graduated from the healthcare accelerator Health Wildcatters in 2013, having raised seed capital of $30,000. Thereafter Cariloop went on to raised $400,000 in seed funding. The company also won $50,000 in prize money at the National Angel Summit in 2014. In 2015, Cariloop raised $180,000 from its seed round investors. In 2020, Cariloop raised a series A round of $6,000,000. In 2021, Cariloop raised a series B round of $15,000,000 In 2024, Cariloop raised a series C round of $20,000,000.
