= Traffic collision avoidance system =

Aircraft collision avoidance system

Traffic alert and collision avoidance system (TCAS; /ˈtiːkæs/ TEE-kas), also called an airborne collision avoidance system (ACAS), is an aircraft collision avoidance system designed to reduce the incidence of mid-air collision (MAC) between aircraft. It monitors the airspace around an aircraft for other aircraft equipped with a corresponding active transponder, independent of air traffic control, and warns pilots of the presence of other transponder-equipped aircraft which may present a threat of MAC. It is a type of airborne collision avoidance system mandated by the International Civil Aviation Organization to be fitted to all aircraft with a maximum take-off mass (MTOM) of over 5,700 kg (12,600 lb) or authorized to carry more than 19 passengers. In the United States, CFR 14, Ch I, part 135 requires that TCAS I be installed for aircraft with 10–30 passengers and TCAS II for aircraft with more than 30 passengers. ACAS/TCAS is based on secondary surveillance radar (SSR) transponder signals, but operates independently of ground-based equipment to provide advice to the pilot on potentially conflicting aircraft.

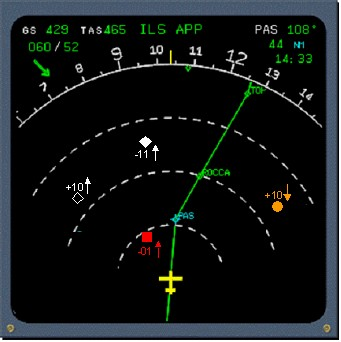
Combined TCAS and EHSI cockpit display (color)

In modern glass cockpit aircraft, the TCAS display may be integrated in the navigation display (ND) or electronic horizontal situation indicator (EHSI).

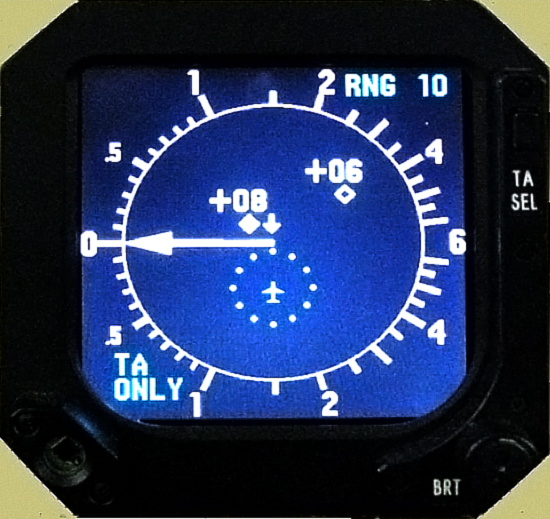
Combined TCAS and VSI cockpit display (monochrome)

In older glass cockpit aircraft and those with mechanical instrumentation, an integrated TCAS display including an instantaneous vertical speed indicator (IVSI) may replace the mechanical IVSI, which only indicates the rate at which the aircraft is descending or climbing.

== Impetus for a system and history ==
Research into collision avoidance systems has been ongoing since at least the 1950s, and the airline industry has been working with the Air Transport Association of America (ATA) since 1955 toward a collision avoidance system. ICAO and aviation authorities such as the Federal Aviation Administration (FAA) were spurred into action by the 1956 Grand Canyon mid-air collision.

Although ATCRBS airborne transponders were available, it was not until the mid-1970s that research focused on using their signals as the cooperative element for a collision avoidance system. This technical approach enabled an independent collision avoidance capability on the flight deck, separate from the ground system. In 1981, the FAA decided to implement the Traffic Alert and Collision Avoidance System (TCAS), which was developed based on industry and agency efforts in the field of beacon-based collision avoidance systems and air-to-air discrete address communication techniques that used Mode S airborne transponder message formats.

A short time later, prototypes of TCAS II were installed on two Piedmont Airlines Boeing 727 aircraft, and were flown on regularly scheduled flights. Although the displays were located outside the view of the flight crew and seen only by trained observers, these tests did provide valuable information on the frequency and circumstances of alerts and their potential for interaction with the ATC system. On a follow-on phase II program, a later version of TCAS II was installed on a single Piedmont Airlines Boeing 727, and the system was certified in April 1986, then subsequently approved for operational evaluation in early 1987. Since the equipment was not developed to full standards, the system was only operated in visual meteorological conditions (VMC). Although the flight crew operated the system, the evaluation was primarily for the purpose of data collection and its correlation with flight crew and observer observation and response.

Later versions of TCAS II manufactured by Bendix/King Air Transport Avionics Division were installed and approved on United Airlines airplanes in early 1988. Similar units manufactured by Honeywell were installed and approved on Northwest Airlines airplanes in late 1988. This limited installation program operated TCAS II units approved for operation as a full-time system in both visual and instrument meteorological conditions (IMC) on three different aircraft types. The operational evaluation programs continued through 1988 to validate the operational suitability of the systems.

=== Incidents ===
The implementation of TCAS added a safety barrier to help prevent mid-air collisions. However, further study, refinements, training and regulatory measures were still required because the limitations and misuse of the system still resulted in other incidents and fatal accidents, which include:

- 1996 Charkhi Dadri mid-air collision accident over New Delhi
- 1999 Lambourne near-collision, involving a Boeing 737-300 and a Gulfstream IV. The airspace above Lambourne is the waiting zone for Heathrow. The event is notable as both planes entered the zone from different directions leading to an imminent head-on collision (one o'clock position). The traffic advisory (amber mark) almost immediately turned into a resolution advisory (red mark) with a projected time for collision of less than 25 seconds.
- 2001 Japan Airlines mid-air incident, in which the captain of Japan Airlines Flight 907 (a Boeing 747-400), 40-year old Makoto Watanabe (渡辺 誠, Watanabe Makoto), chose to descend, ordered by the air traffic controller, when TCAS told the flight crew to climb, nearly colliding with the descending JAL Flight 958 DC-10 en route from Busan to Tokyo's Narita Airport.
- 2002 Überlingen mid-air collision, between a Boeing 757 and a Tupolev Tu-154, where the Tupolev pilots declined to follow their TCAS resolution advisory (RA), instead following the directions of the air traffic controller, while the Boeing pilots followed their TCAS-RA, having no ATC instruction.
- 2006 collision between Gol Transportes Aéreos Flight 1907 (a Boeing 737) and an Embraer Legacy 600; the Embraer's transponder had inadvertently been switched off, disabling its own TCAS and rendering the plane invisible to the TCAS on board flight 1907.
- 2011 Fribourg near-collision, involving Germanwings Airbus A319 Flight 2529 and Hahn Air Lines Raytheon Premier I Flight 201. Air traffic control at Geneva allowed flight 2529 to sink to flight level 250 (25,000 feet [7,620 m]) but entered flight level 280 (28,000 feet [8,534 m]) as usual for handover to traffic control at Zürich. Air traffic control at Zürich allowed flight 201 to climb to flight level 270 (27,000 feet [8,230 m]). This triggered a resolution advisory (RA) for the Airbus to sink and for the Raytheon to climb which was followed by both aircraft. Nine seconds later Geneva instructed the Raytheon to sink to flight level 260 (26,000 feet [7,925 m]) which they then followed. It led to a situation where both planes passed at 100 feet (30 m) minimum distance. Shortly later the Raytheon was lower than the Airbus and TCAS issued a reversal RA for the Airbus to climb and for the Raytheon to sink.

== Overview ==
=== System description ===
TCAS involves communication between all aircraft equipped with an appropriate transponder (provided the transponder is enabled and set up properly). Each TCAS-equipped aircraft interrogates all other aircraft in a determined range about their position (via the 1030 MHz radio frequency), and all other aircraft reply to other interrogations (via 1090 MHz). This interrogation-and-response cycle may occur several times per second.

The TCAS system builds a three dimensional map of aircraft in the airspace, incorporating their range (garnered from the interrogation and response round trip time), altitude (as reported by the interrogated aircraft), and bearing (by the directional antenna from the response). Then, by extrapolating current range and altitude difference to anticipated future values, it determines if a potential collision threat exists.

TCAS and its variants are only able to interact with aircraft that have a correctly operating mode C or mode S transponder. A unique 24-bit identifier is assigned to each aircraft that has a mode S transponder.

The next step beyond identifying potential collisions is automatically negotiating a mutual avoidance manoeuver (currently, manoeuvers are restricted to changes in altitude and modification of climb/sink rates) between the two (or more) conflicting aircraft. These avoidance manoeuvers are communicated to the flight crew by a cockpit display and by synthesized voice instructions.

A protected volume of airspace surrounds each TCAS equipped aircraft. The size of the protected volume depends on the altitude, speed, and heading of the aircraft involved in the encounter. The illustration below gives an example of a typical TCAS protection volume.

TCAS Volume

Symbols used to depict nearby traffic on cockpit displays
◇	Distant traffic
◆	Traffic within 6 NM horizontally and 1200 feet vertically
●	Traffic close enough to trigger TA, within 40 seconds of potential collision
■	Traffic close enough to trigger RA, within 25 seconds of potential collision

=== System components ===
A TCAS installation consists of the following components:

TCAS computer unit
Performs airspace surveillance, intruder tracking, its own aircraft altitude tracking, threat detection, resolution advisory (RA) manoeuvre determination and selection, and generation of advisories. The TCAS processor uses pressure altitude, radar altitude, and discrete aircraft status inputs from its own aircraft to control the collision avoidance logic parameters that determine the protection volume around the TCAS aircraft.
Antennas
The antennas used by TCAS II include a directional antenna that is mounted on the top of the aircraft and either an omnidirectional or a directional antenna mounted on the bottom of the aircraft. Most installations use the optional directional antenna on the bottom of the aircraft. In addition to the two TCAS antennas, two antennas are also required for the Mode S transponder. One antenna is mounted on the top of the aircraft while the other is mounted on the bottom. These antennas enable the Mode S transponder to receive interrogations at 1030 MHz and reply to the received interrogations at 1090 MHz.
Cockpit presentation
The TCAS interface with the pilots is provided by two displays: the traffic display and the RA display. These two displays can be implemented in a number of ways including displays that incorporate both displays into a single, physical unit. Regardless of the implementation, the information displayed is identical. The standards for both the traffic display and the RA display are defined in DO-185A.

== Operation ==
The following section describes the TCAS operation based on TCAS II, since this is the version that has been adopted as an international standard (ACAS II) by ICAO and aviation authorities worldwide.

FAA guidance notes that multiple ACAS II variants may be permitted in U.S. airspace, including TCAS II versions 6.04A Enhanced, 7.0, and 7.1, as well as ACAS Xa, and describes equipage constraints for certain operations such as RVSM airspace.

=== Operation modes ===
TCAS II can be currently operated in the following modes:

Stand-by
Power is applied to the TCAS Processor and the mode S transponder, but TCAS does not issue any interrogations and the transponder will reply to only discrete interrogations.
Transponder
The mode S transponder is fully operational and will reply to all appropriate ground and TCAS interrogations. TCAS remains in stand-by.
Traffic advisories only
The mode S transponder is fully operational. TCAS will operate normally and issue the appropriate interrogations and perform all tracking functions. However, TCAS will only issue traffic advisories (TA), and the resolution advisories (RA) will be inhibited.
Automatic (traffic/resolution advisories)
The mode S transponder is fully operational. TCAS will operate normally and issue the appropriate interrogations and perform all tracking functions. TCAS will issue traffic advisories (TA) and resolution advisories (RA), when appropriate.

TCAS works in a coordinated manner, so when an RA is issued to conflicting aircraft, a required action (i.e., Climb. Climb.) has to be immediately performed by one of the aircraft, while the other one receives a similar RA in the opposite direction (i.e., Descend. Descend.).

=== Alerts ===
TCAS II typical envelope

TCAS II issues the following types of aural annunciations:

- Traffic advisory (TA)
- Resolution advisory (RA)
- Clear of conflict

When a TA is issued, pilots are instructed to initiate a visual search for the traffic causing the TA. If the traffic is visually acquired, pilots are instructed to maintain visual separation from the traffic. Training programs also indicate that no horizontal maneuvers are to be made based solely on information shown on the traffic display. Slight adjustments in vertical speed while climbing or descending, or slight adjustments in airspeed while still complying with the ATC clearance are acceptable.

When an RA is issued, pilots are expected to respond immediately to the RA unless doing so would jeopardize the safe operation of the flight. This means that aircraft will at times have to manoeuver contrary to ATC instructions or disregard ATC instructions. In these cases, the controller is no longer responsible for separation of the aircraft involved in the RA until the conflict is terminated.

On the other hand, ATC can potentially interfere with a pilot's response to RAs. If a conflicting ATC instruction coincides with an RA, a pilot may assume that ATC is fully aware of the situation and is providing the better resolution. But in reality, ATC is not aware of the RA until the RA is reported by the pilot. Once the RA is reported by the pilot, ATC is required not to attempt to modify the flight path of the aircraft involved in the encounter. Hence, the pilot is expected to "follow the RA" but in practice this does not always happen.

Some countries have implemented "RA downlink" which provides air traffic controllers with information about RAs posted in the cockpit. Currently, there are no ICAO provisions concerning the use of RA downlink by air traffic controllers.

The following points receive emphasis during pilot training:

- Do not maneuver in a direction opposite to that indicated by the RA because this may result in a collision.
- Inform the controller of the RA as soon as permitted by flight crew workload after responding to the RA. There is no requirement to make this notification prior to initiating the RA response.
- Be alert for the removal of RAs or the weakening of RAs so that deviations from a cleared altitude are minimized.
- If possible, comply with the controller's clearance, e.g. turn to intercept an airway or localizer, at the same time as responding to an RA.
- When the RA event is completed, promptly return to the previous ATC clearance or instruction or comply with a revised ATC clearance or instruction.

An RA occurs on average every 1,000 flight hours on short/medium-haul aircraft and every 3,000 hours for long-haul aircraft. In its December 2017 ACAS guide, Eurocontrol found in about 25% of the cases, the pilots follow the RA inaccurately. Airbus offers the option of an autopilot/flight director TCAS for automatic avoidance maneuvers.

=== Types of traffic and resolution advisories ===
Type	Text	Meaning	Required action
TA	Traffic; traffic.	Intruder near both horizontally and vertically.	Attempt visual contact, and be prepared to maneuver if an RA occurs.
RA	Climb; climb.	Intruder will pass below.	Begin climbing at 1,500–2,000 ft/min (460–610 m/min).
RA	Descend. Descend.	Intruder will pass above.	Begin descending at 1,500–2,000 ft/min (460–610 m/min).
RA	Increase climb.	Intruder will pass just below.	Climb at 2,500–3,000 ft/min (760–910 m/min).
RA	Increase descent.	Intruder will pass just above.	Descend at 2,500–3,000 ft/min (760–910 m/min).
RA	Reduce climb.	Intruder is probably well below.	Climb at a slower rate.
RA	Reduce descent.	Intruder is probably well above.	Descend at a slower rate.
RA	Climb; climb now.	Intruder that was passing above, will now pass below.	Change from a descent to a climb.
RA	Descend; descend now.	Intruder that was passing below, will now pass above.	Change from a climb to a descent.
RA	Maintain vertical speed; maintain.	Intruder will be avoided if vertical rate is maintained.	Maintain current vertical rate.
RA	Level off, level off.	Intruder considerably away, or weakening of initial RA.	Begin to level off.
RA	Monitor vertical speed.	Intruder ahead in level flight, above or below.	Remain in level flight.
RA	Crossing.	Passing through the intruder's level. Usually added to any other RA.	Proceed according to the associated RA.
CC	Clear of conflict.	Intruder is no longer a threat.	Return promptly to previous ATC clearance.

=== Pilot/aircrew interaction during a TCAS event ===
TCAS event interaction
Aircrew	Controller
Traffic advisory (TA)
Shall not manoeuvre their aircraft in response to traffic advisories (TAs) only	Remains responsible for ATC separation
Should prepare for appropriate action if an RA occurs; but as far as practicable, pilots should not request traffic information	If requested by the aircrew, shall give traffic information
Resolution advisory (RA)
Shall respond immediately and manoeuvre as indicated, unless doing so would jeopardize the safety of the aircraft	Shall not attempt to modify the flight path of an aircraft responding to an RA
Shall follow the RA even if there is a conflict between the RA and an air traffic control (ATC) instruction to manoeuvre	Shall not issue any clearance or instruction to the aircraft involved until the pilot reports returning to the terms of the assigned ATC clearance or instruction
Shall never manoeuvre in the opposite sense to an RA, nor maintain a vertical rate in the opposite sense to an RA	Shall acknowledge the report by using the phrase "ROGER"
When deviating from an air traffic control instruction or clearance in response to any RA, shall: As soon as permitted by flight crew workload, notify the appropriate ATC unit of the deviation.; Immediately inform ATC when they are unable to comply with a clearance or instruction that conflicts with an RA.	If requested by the aircrew, shall give traffic information
Shall promptly comply with any subsequent RAs issued by TCAS	Ceases to be responsible for providing separation between that aircraft and any other aircraft affected as a direct consequence of the manoeuvre induced by the RA, as long as the pilot reported the TCAS RA.
Shall limit the alterations of the flight path to the minimum extent necessary to comply with the resolution advisories	
Clear of conflict (CC)
Shall promptly return to the terms of the ATC instruction or clearance when the conflict is resolved	Shall resume responsibility for providing separation for all the affected aircraft when he acknowledges: A report from the pilot that the aircraft is resuming the assigned ATC clearance or instruction and issues an alternative clearance or instruction which is acknowledged by the pilot; A report from the pilot that the aircraft has resumed the assigned ATC clearance or instruction
Shall notify ATC after initiating a return to or resuming the current clearance	

== Safety aspects ==
Safety studies on TCAS estimate that the system improves safety in the airspace by a factor of between 3 and 5.

However, it is well understood that part of the remaining risk is that TCAS may induce midair collisions: "In particular, it is dependent on the accuracy of the threat aircraft's reported altitude and on the expectation that the threat aircraft will not make an abrupt maneuver that defeats the TCAS Resolution Advisory (RA). The safety study also shows that TCAS II will induce some critical near midair collisions..." (See page 7 of Introduction to TCAS II Version 7 and 7.1 (PDF) in external links below).

One potential problem with TCAS II is the possibility that a recommended avoidance maneuver might direct the flight crew to descend toward terrain below a safe altitude. Recent requirements for incorporation of ground proximity mitigate this risk. Ground proximity warning alerts have priority in the cockpit over TCAS alerts.

Some pilots have been unsure how to act when their aircraft was requested to climb whilst flying at their maximum altitude. The accepted procedure is to follow the climb RA as best as possible, temporarily trading speed for height. The climb RA should quickly finish. In the event of a stall warning, the stall warning would take priority.

Both cases have been addressed by Version 7.0 of TCAS II and are currently handled by a corrective RA together with a visual indication of a green arc in the IVSI display to indicate the safe range for the climb or descent rate. However, it has been found that in some cases these indications could lead to a dangerous situation for the involved aircraft. For example, if a TCAS event occurs when two aircraft are descending one over the other for landing, the aircraft at the lower altitude will first receive a "Descend, descend" RA, and when reaching an extreme low altitude, this will change to a "Level off, level off" RA, together with a green arc indication directing the pilot to level off the aircraft. This could place the aircraft dangerously into the path of the intruder above, who is descending to land. A change proposal has been issued to correct this problem.

== Security aspects ==
TCAS was not designed with security in mind, even in its newest versions. With the rise of software-defined radios, security researchers have investigated wireless attacks on TCAS. Researchers demonstrate how to take full control over the collision avoidance displays and create RAs of arbitrary aircraft on a collision course. These attacks can be launched using commercial off-the-shelf hardware and could be used to instruct the pilot to climb or descend at will. However, these attacks are only possible when the attacker is close to the victim aircraft (up to a distance of 4.2 km), limiting the risk of abuse in the real world.

== Relationship to Traffic Advisory System (TAS) ==
TCAS technology has proved to be too expensive for small business and general aviation aircraft. Manufacturers and authorities recognized the need for an alternative to TCAS; this led to the development of the Traffic Advisory System. TAS is actually a simplified version of TCAS I. The system structure, components, operation, traffic display and TA logic are identical, but the minimum operational performance standards (MOPS) of TAS allow some simplification compared to TCAS I:

- Class A and Class B equipment are defined, where Class A is identical to TCAS I but Class B devices operate without traffic display (the latter give aural TAs only, accompanied by some visual representation of the TA).
- TAS display can be monochrome.
- There are very minor differences in operational tolerance values.
- TAS devices can provide only two levels of advisories: Other Traffic and Traffic Advisories (TAs). Displaying proximate traffic and Proximate Advisories (PAs) are optional, nevertheless most of the TAS devices provide the tracking of proximate traffic and use the standard TCAS I symbology.
- To assure that all interference effects from the TCAS I equipment are kept to a low level, TCAS I equipments continuously count the number of TCAS aircraft in the vicinity and reduce their interrogation rate or power or both to conform to the operational limits. This is also true to TAS equipments, but the manufacturer may choose to operate a TAS as a low power system at a fixed rate power product limit of 42W/sec, in which case the requirement to interference limitation is eliminated.

The following documents contain all of the differences between TCAS I and TAS:

- the minimum operational performance standards (MOPS) of TCAS I are described at RTCA-DO-197A,
- and changes to this document applicable to Traffic Advisory System (TAS) are published in TSO-C147a (or ETSO-C147a) Appendix 1.

In spite of all this, most of the manufacturers do not take the above-mentioned opportunities to make simplified devices. As a result of market forces, many TAS systems operate just like TCAS I (with interference limiting, using TCAS I symbology, etc.), with some having even better surveillance performance (in range and tracked aircraft) and specifications than TCAS I.

== Relationship to automatic dependent surveillance – broadcast (ADS–B) ==
Automatic dependent surveillance – broadcast (ADS–B) messages are transmitted from aircraft equipped with suitable transponders, containing information such as identity, location, and velocity. The signals are broadcast on the 1090 MHz radio frequency. ADS-B messages are also carried on a universal access transceiver (UAT) in the 978 MHz band.

TCAS equipment which is capable of processing ADS–B messages may use this information to enhance the performance of TCAS, using techniques known as "hybrid surveillance". As currently implemented, hybrid surveillance uses reception of ADS–B messages from an aircraft to reduce the rate at which the TCAS equipment interrogates that aircraft. This reduction in interrogations reduces the use of the 1030/1090 MHz radio channel, and will over time extend the operationally useful life of TCAS technology. The ADS–B messages will also allow low cost (for aircraft) technology to provide real time traffic in the cockpit for small aircraft. Currently UAT based traffic uplinks are provided in Alaska and in regions of the East coast of the US.

Hybrid surveillance does not make use of ADS–B's aircraft flight information in the TCAS conflict detection algorithms; ADS–B is used only to identify aircraft that can safely be interrogated at a lower rate.

In the future, prediction capabilities may be improved by using the state vector information present in ADS–B messages. Also, since ADS–B messages can be received at greater range than TCAS normally operates, aircraft can be acquired earlier by the TCAS tracking algorithms.

The identity information present in ADS–B messages can be used to label other aircraft on the cockpit display (where present), painting a picture similar to what an air traffic controller would see and improving situational awareness.

== Versions ==
=== TCAS I ===
TCAS I is a cheaper but less capable system than the modern TCAS II system introduced for general aviation use after the FAA mandate for TCAS II in air transport aircraft. TCAS I systems are able to monitor the traffic situation around a plane (to a range of about 40 miles) and offer information on the approximate bearing and altitude of other aircraft. It can also generate collision warnings in the form of a "Traffic Advisory" (TA). The TA warns the pilot that another aircraft is in near vicinity, announcing "Traffic, traffic", but does not offer any suggested remedy; it is up to the pilot to decide what to do, usually with the assistance of Air Traffic Control. When a threat has passed, the system announces "Clear of conflict".

=== TCAS II ===
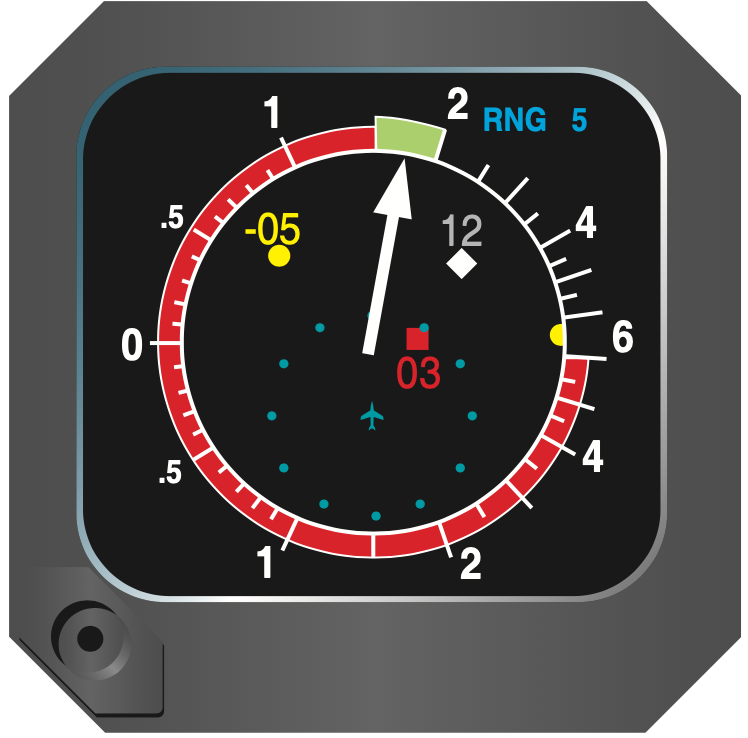
An example of a resolution advisory (RA), where the pilot is requested to climb at 1,750 feet per minute to avoid nearby traffic (shown in red)

TCAS II is the first system that was introduced in 1989 and is the current generation of instrument warning TCAS, used in the majority of commercial aviation aircraft (see table below). A US Airways 737 was the first aircraft certified with the AlliedBendix (now Honeywell) TCAS II system. It offers all the benefits of TCAS I, but will also offer the pilot direct, vocalized instructions to avoid danger, known as a "Resolution Advisory" (RA). The suggestive action may be "corrective", suggesting the pilot change vertical speed by announcing, "Descend, descend", "Climb, climb" or "Level off, level off" (meaning reduce vertical speed). By contrast a "preventive" RA may be issued which simply warns the pilots not to deviate from their present vertical speed, announcing, "Monitor vertical speed" or "Maintain vertical speed, Maintain". TCAS II systems coordinate their resolution advisories before issuing commands to the pilots, so that if one aircraft is instructed to descend, the other will typically be told to climb – maximising the separation between the two aircraft.

As of 2006, the only implementation that meets the ACAS II standards set by ICAO was Version 7.0 of TCAS II, produced by three avionics manufacturers: Rockwell Collins, Honeywell, and ACSS (Aviation Communication & Surveillance Systems; an L3Harris and Thales Avionics joint venture company).

After the 2002 Überlingen mid-air collision (July 1, 2002), studies have been made to improve TCAS II capabilities. Following extensive Eurocontrol input and pressure, a revised TCAS II Minimum Operational Performance Standards (MOPS) document has been jointly developed by RTCA (Special Committee SC-147) and EUROCAE. As a result, by 2008 the standards for Version 7.1 of TCAS II have been issued and published as RTCA DO-185B (June 2008) and EUROCAE ED-143 (September 2008).

TCAS II Version 7.1 will be able to issue RA reversals in coordinated encounters, in case one of the aircraft doesn't follow the original RA instructions (Change proposal CP112E). Other changes in this version are the replacement of the ambiguous "Adjust Vertical Speed, Adjust" RA with the "Level off, Level off" RA, to prevent improper response by the pilots (Change proposal CP115).; and the improved handling of corrective/preventive annunciation and removal of green arc display when a positive RA weakens solely due to an extreme low or high altitude condition (1000 feet AGL or below, or near the aircraft top ceiling) to prevent incorrect and possibly dangerous guidance to the pilot (Change proposal CP116).

Studies conducted for Eurocontrol, using recently recorded operational data, indicate that currently the probability of a mid-air collision for each flight hour in European airspace is 2.7 × 10^{−8} which equates to one in every 3 years. When TCAS II Version 7.1 is implemented, that probability will be reduced by a factor of 4.

Although ACAS III is mentioned as a future system in ICAO Annex 10, ACAS III is unlikely to materialize due to difficulties the current surveillance systems have with horizontal tracking. Currently, research is being conducted to develop a future collision avoidance system (under the working name of ACAS X).

=== TCAS III ===
Originally designated TCAS II Enhanced, TCAS III was envisioned as an expansion of the TCAS II concept to include horizontal resolution advisory capability. TCAS III was the "next generation" of collision avoidance technology which underwent development by aviation companies such as Honeywell. TCAS III incorporated technical upgrades to the TCAS II system, and had the capability to offer traffic advisories and resolve traffic conflicts using horizontal as well as vertical manoeuvring directives to pilots. For instance, in a head-on situation, one aircraft might be directed, "turn right, climb" while the other would be directed "turn right, descend." This would act to further increase the total separation between aircraft, in both horizontal and vertical aspects. Horizontal directives would be useful in a conflict between two aircraft close to the ground where there may be little if any vertical maneuvering space.

TCAS III attempted to use the TCAS directional antenna to assign a bearing to other aircraft, and thus be able to generate a horizontal maneuver (e.g. turn left or right). However, it was judged by the industry to be unfeasible due to limitations in the accuracy of the TCAS directional antennas. The directional antennas were judged not to be accurate enough to generate an accurate horizontal-plane position, and thus an accurate horizontal resolution. By 1995, years of testing and analysis determined that the concept was unworkable using available surveillance technology (due to the inadequacy of horizontal position information), and that horizontal RAs were unlikely to be invoked in most encounter geometries. Hence, all work on TCAS III was suspended and there are no plans for its implementation. The concept has later evolved and been replaced by TCAS IV.

=== TCAS IV ===
TCAS IV uses additional information encoded by the target aircraft in the Mode S transponder reply (i.e. target encodes its own position into the transponder signal) to generate a horizontal resolution to an RA. In addition, some reliable source of position (such as Inertial Navigation System or GPS) is needed on the target aircraft in order for it to be encoded.

TCAS IV had replaced the TCAS III concept by the mid-1990s. One of the results of TCAS III experience was that the directional antenna used by the TCAS processor to assign a bearing to a received transponder reply was not accurate enough to generate an accurate horizontal position, and thus a safe horizontal resolution. TCAS IV used additional position information encoded on an air-to-air data link to generate the bearing information, so that the accuracy of the directional antenna would not be a factor.

TCAS IV development continued for some years, but the appearance of new trends in data link such as Automatic Dependent Surveillance – Broadcast (ADS-B) have pointed out a need to re-evaluate whether a data link system dedicated to collision avoidance such as TCAS IV should be incorporated into a more generic system of air-to-air data link for additional applications. As a result of these issues, the TCAS IV concept was abandoned as ADS-B development started.

== Current implementation ==
Although the system occasionally suffers from false alarms, pilots are now under strict instructions to regard all TCAS messages as genuine alerts demanding an immediate, high-priority response. Only Windshear Detection and GPWS alerts and warnings have higher priority than the TCAS. The FAA, EASA and most other countries' authorities' rules state that in the case of a conflict between TCAS RA and air traffic control (ATC) instructions, the TCAS RA always takes precedence. This is mainly because of the TCAS-RA inherently possessing a more current and comprehensive picture of the situation than air traffic controllers, whose radar/transponder updates usually happen at a much slower rate than the TCAS interrogations. If one aircraft follows a TCAS RA and the other follows conflicting ATC instructions, a collision can occur, such as the July 1, 2002 Überlingen disaster. In this mid-air collision, both airplanes were fitted with TCAS II Version 7.0 systems which functioned properly, but one obeyed the TCAS advisory while the other ignored the TCAS and obeyed the controller; both aircraft descended into a fatal collision.

This accident could have been prevented if TCAS were able to reverse the original RA for one of the aircraft when it detects that the crew of the other one is not following their original TCAS RA, but conflicting ATC instructions instead. This is one of the features implemented in Version 7.1 of TCAS II.

Implementation of TCAS II Version 7.1 has been originally planned to start between 2009 and 2011 by retrofitting and forward fitting all the TCAS II equipped aircraft, with the goal that by 2014 the version 7.0 will be completely phased out and replaced by version 7.1. The FAA and EASA have already published the TCAS II Version 7.1 Technical Standard Order (TSO-C119c and ETSO-C119c, respectively) effective since 2009, based on the RTCA DO-185B and EUROCAE ED-143 standards. On 25 September 2009 FAA issued Advisory Circular AC 20-151A providing guidance for obtaining airworthiness approval for TCAS II systems, including the new version 7.1. On 5 October 2009, the Association of European Airlines (AEA) published a Position Paper showing the need to mandate TCAS II Version 7.1 on all aircraft as a matter of priority. On 25 March 2010, the European Aviation Safety Agency (EASA) published Notice of Proposed Amendment (NPA) No. 2010-03 pertaining to the introduction of ACAS II software version 7.1. On 14 September 2010, EASA published the Comment Response Document (CRD) to the above-mentioned NPA. Separately, a proposal has been made to amend the ICAO standard to require TCAS II Version 7.1 for compliance with ACAS II SARPs.

ICAO has circulated an amendment for formal member state agreement which recommends TCAS II Change 7.1 adoption by 1 January 2014 for forward fit and 1 January 2017 for retrofit. Following the feedback and comments from airline operators, EASA has proposed the following dates for the TCAS II Version 7.1 mandate in European airspace: forward fit (for new aircraft) 1 March 2012, retrofit (for existing aircraft) 1 December 2015. These dates are proposed dates, subject to further regulatory processes, and are not final until the Implementing Rule has been published.

Among the system manufacturers, by February 2010 ACSS certified Change 7.1 for their TCAS 2000 and Legacy TCAS II systems, and is currently offering Change 7.1 upgrade for their customers. By June 2010 Honeywell published a white paper with their proposed solutions for TCAS II Version 7.1. Rockwell Collins currently announces that their TCAS-94, TCAS-4000 and TSS-4100 TCAS II compliant systems are software upgradeable to Change 7.1 when available.

=== Current limitations ===
While the safety benefits of current TCAS implementations are self-evident, the full technical and operational potential of TCAS is not fully exploited due to limitations in current implementations (most of which will need to be addressed in order to further facilitate the design and implementation of Free flight) and NextGen:

- Most TCAS II issues reported to the Aviation Safety Reporting System (ASRS) encompass anomalous or erroneous operation of TCAS II equipment, TCAS-induced distraction, airborne conflicts provoked by TCAS, and non-standard use of TCAS.
- Like a controller, TCAS II uses Mode C information to determine vertical separation on other traffic. Should Mode C even temporarily provide erroneous altitude information, an erroneous Resolution Advisory command to climb or descend may result. Unlike a controller, TCAS II cannot query the flight crew to determine if the problem lies with malfunctioning equipment.
- Pilots frequently cite TCAS II related auditory and workload interference with normal cockpit duties.
- Many TCAS incident reports received at the ASRS allege that pilot response to erroneous TCAS commands has promoted a conflict where, initially, none existed. Consider the following near mid-air collision (NMAC) where the TCAS II RA may well have been triggered by the high climb rate of air carrier (Y).
- TCAS is limited to supporting only vertical separation advisories, more complex traffic conflict scenarios may however be more easily and efficiently remedied by also making use of lateral resolution maneuvers; this applies in particular to traffic conflicts with marginal terrain clearance, or conflict scenarios that are similarly restricted by vertical constraints (e.g. in busy RVSM airspace)
- ATC can be automatically informed about resolution advisories issued by TCAS only when the aircraft is within an area covered by a Mode S, or an ADS-B monitoring network. In other cases controllers may be unaware of TCAS-based resolution advisories or even issue conflicting instructions (unless ATC is explicitly informed by cockpit crew members about an issued RA during a high-workload situation), which may be a source of confusion for the affected crews while additionally also increasing pilot work load. In May 2009, Luxembourg, Hungary and the Czech Republic show downlinked RAs to controllers.
- In the above context, TCAS lacks automated facilities to enable pilots to easily report and acknowledge reception of a (mandatory) RA to ATC (and intention to comply with it), so that voice radio is currently the only option to do so, which however additionally increases pilot and ATC workload, as well as frequency congestion during critical situations.
- In the same context, situational awareness of ATC depends on exact information about aircraft maneuvering, especially during conflict scenarios that may possibly cause or contribute to new conflicts by deviating from planned routing, so automatically visualizing issued resolution advisories and recalculating the traffic situation within the affected sector would obviously help ATC in updating and maintaining situational awareness even during unplanned, ad hoc routing changes induced by separation conflicts.
- Today's TCAS displays do not provide information about resolution advisories issued to other (conflicting) aircraft, while resolution advisories issued to other aircraft may seem irrelevant to another aircraft, this information would enable and help crews to assess whether other aircraft (conflicting traffic) actually comply with RAs by comparing the actual rate of (altitude) change with the requested rate of change (which could be done automatically and visualized accordingly by modern avionics), thereby providing crucial realtime information for situational awareness during highly critical situations.
- TCAS displays today are often primarily range-based, as such they only show the traffic situation within a configurable range of miles/feet, however under certain circumstances a "time-based" representation (i.e. within the next xx minutes) might be more intuitive.
- Lack of terrain/ground and obstacle awareness (e.g. connection to TAWS, including MSA sector awareness), which might be critical for creating feasible (non-dangerous, in the context of terrain clearance) and useful resolution advisories (i.e. prevent extreme descent instructions if close to terrain), to ensure that TCAS RAs never facilitate CFIT (Controlled Flight into Terrain) scenarios.
- Aircraft performance in general and current performance capabilities in particular (due to active aircraft configuration) are not taken into account during the negotiation and creation of resolution advisories (as it is the case for differences between different types of aircraft, e.g. turboprop/jet vs. helicopters), so that it is theoretically possible that resolution advisories are issued that demand climb or sink rates outside the normal/safe flight envelope of an aircraft during a certain phase of flight (i.e. due to the aircraft's current configuration). Furthermore, as all traffic is being dealt with equally, there's no distinction taking place between different types of aircraft, neglecting the option of exploiting aircraft-specific (performance) information to issue customized and optimized instructions for any given traffic conflict (i.e. by issuing climb instructions to those aircraft that can provide the best climb rates, while issuing descend instructions to aircraft providing comparatively better sink rates, thereby hopefully maximizing altitude change per time unit, that is separation). As an example, TCAS can order an aircraft to climb when it is already at its service ceiling for its current configuration.
- TCAS is primarily extrapolation-oriented, as such it is using algorithms trying to approximate 4D trajectory prediction using the "flight path history", in order to assess and evaluate the current traffic situation within an aircraft's proximity, however the degree of data- reliability and usefulness could be significantly improved by enhancing said information with limited access to relevant flight plan information, as well as to relevant ATC instructions to get a more comprehensive picture of other traffic's (route) plans and intentions, so that flight path predictions would no longer be merely based on estimations but rather actual aircraft routing (FMS flight plan) and ATC instructions. If TCAS is modified to use data that are used by other systems, care will be required to ensure that the risks of common failure modes are sufficiently small.
- TCAS is not fitted to many smaller aircraft mainly due to the high costs involved (between $25,000 and $150,000). Many smaller personal business jets for example, are currently not legally required to have TCAS installed, even though they fly in the same airspace as larger aircraft that are required to have proper TCAS equipment on board. The TCAS system can only perform at its true operational potential once all aircraft in any given airspace have a properly working TCAS unit on board.
- TCAS requires that both conflicting aircraft have transponders. If one aircraft doesn't have a transponder, then it will not alert TCAS as there is no information being transmitted.
- Military aircraft may not be using TCAS. They could be operating with their transponders off based on their mission requirements.

To overcome some of these limitations, the FAA is developing a new collision avoidance logic based on dynamic programming.

In response to a series of midair collisions involving commercial airliners, Lincoln Laboratory was directed by the Federal Aviation Administration in the 1970s to participate in the development of an onboard collision avoidance system. In its current manifestation, the Traffic Alert and Collision Avoidance System is mandated worldwide on all large aircraft and has significantly improved the safety of air travel, but major changes to the airspace planned over the coming years will require substantial modification to the system.

==== ACAS X ====
A set of new systems called ACAS X will use this new logic:

- ACAS Xa will be a direct replacement for TCAS II, using active surveillance
- ACAS Xo will be collision avoidance tuned to work in some currently difficult operational situations, notably closely spaced parallel approaches.
- ACAS Xu will allow multiple sensor inputs and be optimised for unmanned airborne systems.
- ACAS Xp will be designed for aircraft with only passive surveillance (ADS-B).

The first FAA-scheduled industry meeting was held in October 2011 in Washington DC, to brief avionics manufacturers on the development plans for "ACAS X" – including flight demonstrations scheduled for fiscal 2013. The FAA says its work "will be foundational to the development of minimum operational performance standards" for ACAS X by standards developer RTCA.

It is estimated that, if ACAS X will be further developed and certified, ACAS X will not be commercially available before the mid 2020s. And it is said to be unclear at this stage whether ACAS X would provide any horizontal resolutions.

=== Regulatory situation around the world ===
Jurisdiction (Agency)	Classification of aircraft	TCAS mode	Date of mandate
India (DGCA)	Aeroplane having a maximum certified passenger seating configuration of more than 30 seats or a maximum payload capacity of more than 3 tons	TCAS II	31 December 1998
USA (FAA)	All commercial turbine-powered transport aircraft with more than 30 passenger seats (or MTOM above 33,000 lb or 15,000 kg)	TCAS II	1 January 1994
Europe (EASA)	All civil turbine-powered transport aircraft with more than 30 passenger seats (or MTOM above 15,000 kg)	TCAS II	1 January 2000
Europe (EASA)	All civil turbine-powered transport aircraft with more than 19 passenger seats (or MTOM above 5,700 kg)	ACAS II (Effectively TCAS II Version 7.1)	1 March 2012
Europe (EASA)	All civil turbine-powered transport aircraft with more than 19 passenger seats (or MTOM above 5,700 kg)	ACAS Xa or ACAS II (Effectively TCAS II Version 7.1)	10 March 2025
Australia (CASA)	All commercial turbine-powered transport aircraft with more than 30 passenger seats (or MTOM above 15,000 kg)	TCAS II	1 January 2000
Hong Kong (Civil Aviation Department)	All aircraft in Hong Kong with more than 9 passenger seats (or MTOM greater than 5,700 kg)	TCAS II Version 7.0	1 January 2000
Brazil (National Civil Aviation Agency)	All transport category aircraft with more than 30 passenger seats	TCAS II Version 7.0	1 January 2008
Peru (Dirección General de Aeronáutica Civil)	All civil turbine-powered transport aircraft with more than 19 passenger seats (or MTOM above 5,700 kg)	ACAS II (Effectively TCAS II Version 7.0)	1 January 2005
Argentina (ANAC)	All civil turbine-powered transport aircraft with more than 19 passenger seats (or MTOM above 5,700 kg)	ACAS II (Effectively TCAS II Version 7.0)	1 December 2014

== Proposals ==
Airbus and Honeywell have tested a proposed automated system, where if the pilot ignored a Resolution Advisory, the aircraft's autopilot would automatically take evasive action.

== See also ==
- Automatic dependent surveillance – broadcast
- Ground Proximity Warning System
- Mid-air collision (MAC)
- Obstacle Collision Avoidance System
- Portable collision avoidance system
- Voice warning system
