= Caring.com =

American online senior care platform

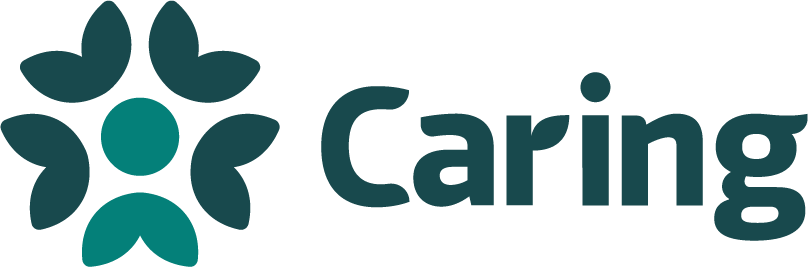
- Headquarters: Charlotte, North Carolina, United States
- Area served: United States
- Founders: Andy Cohen; Steve Fram; Jim Scott
- Industry: Senior care
- Website: caring.com
- Launched: 2007; 19 years ago

Caring.com is an American online senior care platform based in Charlotte, North Carolina.

== History ==
Caring.com was founded in 2007 in San Mateo, California by Andy Cohen, Steve Fram, and Jim Scott, after Cohen's experience caring for his mother during her terminal lung cancer illness highlighted the lack of centralized eldercare resources for family caregivers. In September 2007, it raised $6 million in a Series A funding round from venture capital firms DCM and Split Rock Partners.

In October 2009, Caring.com acquired Gilbert Guide, an online guide for senior housing, which it later folded into its directory and discontinued as a separate website. In November 2009, it closed a $10 million Series B funding round led by Shasta Ventures, with participation from existing investors DCM and Split Rock Partners.

In 2010, Caring.com raised an additional $4 million from Intel Capital and launched an online tool that provided personalized guidance on Alzheimer's care based on patient symptoms and behaviors reported by family caregivers.

In May 2014, Bankrate acquired Caring.com for $54 million. In January 2015, Caring.com acquired Seattle-based platform SeniorHomes.com.

In 2017, Red Ventures acquired Bankrate for $1.4 billion, but the Federal Trade Commission required the divestiture of Caring.com on the grounds that two of Red Ventures' largest shareholders jointly owned A Place for Mom.

In December 2018, Caring.com acquired PayingforSeniorCare.com. In 2019, Caring.com relocated its headquarters from San Mateo, California to Charlotte, North Carolina. In March 2020, Caring.com acquired Austin-based SeniorAdvice.com.

In April 2024, Caring.com's board of directors appointed Tracey Zhen, a former president of Zipcar, as the chief executive officer. She succeeded Jim Rosenthal.

In January 2026, SilverAssist, a senior assistance network whose portfolio also includes Oasis Senior Advisors and ElderLife Financial, acquired Caring.com from Caring Holdings.

== Platform ==
Caring.com is an online platform that provides information and resources on aging and caregiving, including a caregiver resource center and search tools for finding assisted living and home care services. Its online directory contains consumer ratings and reviews on local senior living communities and care providers to support care seekers during their research. The platform also operates a toll-free referral helpline staffed by Family Advisors who provide guidance to families researching senior care options. Caring.com generates revenue from multiple sources, including referral fees from senior housing and care providers and listing subscription fees.

Caring.com also publishes original market research and consumer surveys in the form of annual senior care and senior living reports, including the Wills & Estate Planning Study, which has been issued since 2015, and the Best States for Senior Living Report.

== Caring Stars ==
Established in January 2012, the Caring Stars annual list is a compilation of the highest-rated senior living communities and senior care agencies across the U.S. The selection process for this list involves specific reviews-based criteria, including a specific volume of published ratings and reviews from both residents and their relatives. To finalize the Caring Stars list for each year, Caring.com's team also implements quality control measures, including conducting an integrity audit of consumer reviews and confirming the service provider's state licensure for care levels and states where required.
