= Kiwi.com =

European online travel agency

- Formerly: SkyPicker.com
- Industry: Online travel agency
- Founded: 2012
- Founder: Oliver Dlouhý
- Headquarters: Brno, Czech Republic
- Revenue: €227 million (2025)
- Operating income: €15 million (2025)
- Net income: €−0.6 million (2025)
- Total assets: 1,618,816,000 Czech koruna (2021)
- Owner: General Atlantic (66.7%); Oliver Dlouhý (21%); Jozef Képesi (10.2%)
- Number of employees: c. 450 (2026)
- Website: www.kiwi.com

Kiwi.com is an international online travel agency headquartered in the Czech Republic. Kiwi.com provides booking for airline tickets and its ticket search features virtual interlining, an innovation that combines airlines in a single itinerary. Kiwi.com’s search engine processes over 100 million flight searches every day.

The company sold 18.9 million flight seats in 2025 and has reported annual gross bookings exceeding €2 billion. Alongside its Czech headquarters, Kiwi.com has offices in Spain, the UK, Slovakia and the US.

== History ==
Kiwi.com was founded in Brno in 2012 as Skypicker by Oliver Dlouhý and Jozef Képesi. Dlouhý developed the idea after planning a low-cost trip to Portugal by combining separate flights, while Képesi built the search engine. Czech entrepreneur Jiří Hlavenka provided the company's initial funding.

Skypicker initially focused on creating itineraries that combined flights from low-cost carriers without interline agreements. On some routes, these combinations could offer substantially lower fares than conventional connecting itineraries. The company's sales grew largely through metasearch engines like Skyscanner or Kayak.

In 2014, Skypicker acquired the flight-search website WhichAirline.com after receiving investment from Touzimsky Airlines. The following year, Czech investor Ondřej Tomek acquired a 10% stake, with the investment intended partly to expand the company's airline inventory.

In May 2016, Skypicker changed its name to Kiwi.com after acquiring the domain name. The rebranding accompanied a strategy to increase direct bookings and expand beyond flight search. Kiwi.com subsequently ranked seventh in Deloitte's 2017 Technology Fast 500 EMEA.

In June 2019, General Atlantic acquired a majority stake in Kiwi.com. Dlouhý and Képesi remained significant shareholders and continued in executive roles.

== Business model and services ==
Kiwi.com is an online travel agency specializing in virtual interlining, a system that combines flights and other transport services from carriers that do not cooperate through interline agreements. The platform creates itineraries using hundreds of transport providers, including low-cost carriers.

Virtual-interlining itineraries can involve self-transfer, which may include collecting and re-checking baggage, changing terminals, or completing customs. Kiwi.com accounts for the time needed for the transfer when constructing such itineraries. However, a delay or schedule change to an earlier flight can still lead to a missed connection. For such situations, Kiwi.com offers the "Kiwi.com Guarantee", which includes disruption protection, automatic check-in and real-time flight and boarding information.

Kiwi.com also offers a smart multi-city search feature known as Nomad, which can reorder selected destinations to find a lower-cost itinerary.

== Airline relations and distribution ==
Kiwi.com has had disputes with airlines over its ticket-distribution practices.

In 2021, Southwest Airlines sued the company over its use of fare data taken from Southwest's website. The dispute ended with a injunction prohibiting Kiwi.com from selling Southwest's flights without authorization.

Before the partnership with Ryanair, Kiwi.com sold Ryanair's flights without a direct distribution agreement. The companies were involved in disputes over ticket distribution and the handling of customer information.

From 2024, Kiwi.com increasingly shifted toward direct distribution agreements with airlines. Besides Ryanair, it established or partnerships with easyJet, Air France–KLM, Lufthansa and American Airlines.

== Operations ==
Kiwi.com is headquartered in Brno, its largest office, and also has offices in Prague, Bratislava, Barcelona and London, with a smaller presence in Miami. Its registered office is in Karlín, Prague.

The company has increasingly automated parts of its customer-service operations. By 2025, all incoming customer requests were initially processed using artificial intelligence, with about 80% handled without escalation.

== COVID-19 pandemic ==
The COVID-19 pandemic caused a sharp decline in Kiwi.com's business as international travel restrictions disrupted the airline industry. Gross bookings fell from roughly €1.3 billion in 2019 to about €450 million in 2020. The company recorded a net loss of approximately €38 million (CZK 1.01 billion) in 2020.

The pandemic also generated an unusually large volume of cancellations and refund requests across the travel industry. A 2021 report by the European Court of Auditors found that passengers who booked flights through intermediaries experienced partial, delayed or missing refunds, reflecting problems in coordination between airlines and travel agencies and gaps in the legal framework.

== See also ==
- Booking.com
- Super.com
- Kayak
- Skyscanner
