= William E. Ford =

Chief Executive Officer

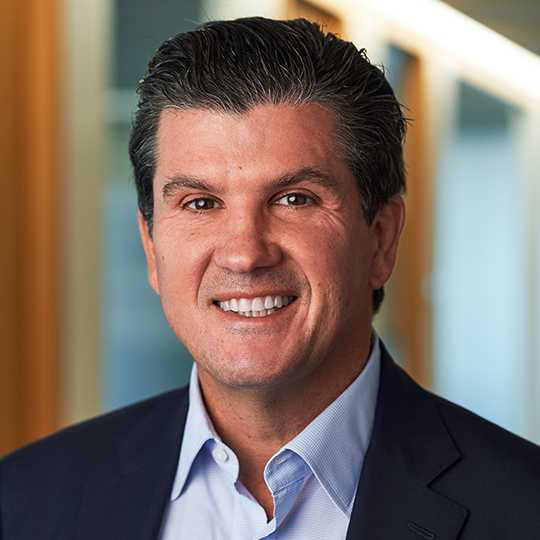
- Ford in October 2017
- Born: June 18, 1961 (age 65); Orange, New Jersey, U.S.
- Education: Amherst College (B.A.); Stanford University (M.B.A.)
- Occupations: Chairman and CEO of General Atlantic
- Board member of: BlackRock
- Spouse: Molly Birkenes (m. 2022)

William E. Ford (born June 18, 1961) is an American businessman. He is the chairman and CEO of General Atlantic, a global investing firm with $118 billion in assets under management as of September, 2025.

== Career and education ==
Ford has been the chief executive officer of General Atlantic since his appointment in 2007. Ford joined General Atlantic in 1991, having previously worked at Morgan Stanley & Co. as an investment banker.

He is on the board of General Atlantic portfolio company ByteDance. He also is on the board of BlackRock.

Ford received his M.B.A. from the Stanford Graduate School of Business in 1987 and his B.A. in economics from Amherst College in 1983.

== Philanthropy and public positions ==
Ford is Chair of Rockefeller University and is on the board of trustees of the Memorial Sloan Kettering Cancer Center. He is on the board of directors of the National Committee on United States-China Relations and the Simons Foundation. He was previously on the board of directors of the Lincoln Center. Furthermore, he is a member of the Council on Foreign Relations, a member of the steering committee for The CEO Action for Diversity and Inclusion, and is on the advisory board of Tsinghua University School of Economics and Management.

In July 2022, Ford helped found a group of U.S. business and policy leaders who share the goal of constructively engaging with China in order to improve U.S.-China relations.

In 2025, Ford donated $1.25 million to MAGA Inc., a super PAC that supports Donald Trump.

In 2026, Ford and his family donated $50 million to Amherst College in support of a new student center and dining commons. The gift is one of the largest in the College’s history.

== Awards and recognition ==
Ford was ranked #5 on the Forbes Midas List in 2009 and #6 in 2008.
