= Leucine-responsive regulatory protein =

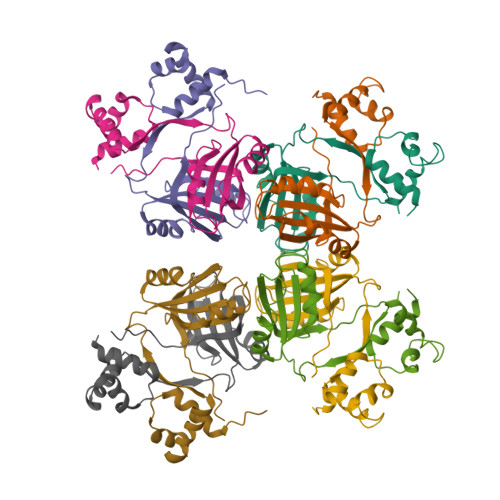
- Structure of Escherichia coli Leucine-responsive regulatory protein

Identifiers
- Organism: Escherichia coli
- Symbol: lrp
- Entrez: 949051
- RefSeq (mRNA): NC_000913.3
- RefSeq (Prot): NP_415409.1
- UniProt: P0ACJ0

Other data
- Chromosome: Genomic: 0.03 - 0.03 Mb
Search for
- Structures: Swiss-model
- Domains: InterPro

Leucine responsive protein, or Lrp, is a global regulator protein, meaning that it regulates the biosynthesis of leucine, as well as the other branched-chain amino acids, valine and isoleucine. In bacteria, it is encoded by the lrp gene.

Lrp alternatively activates and represses the expression of acetolactate synthase's (ALS) several isoenzymes. Lrp, in E. coli, along with DAM plays a role in the regulation of the fim operon, a group of genes needed for successful synthesis and trafficking of Type I Pili. These hair like structures are important virulence factors for different pathogenic strains of Bacteria as they can mediate biofilm formation and adhesion to host epithelia. Other examples include Salmonella enterica serovar Typhimurium and Klebsiella pneumoniae.

More generally, Lrp facilitates the proliferation and pathogenesis of bacteria in their hosts.

== Lrp in E. coli ==
Lrp plays a crucial role as a significant regulator in E. coli and other bacterial species. The E. coli Lrp is the most extensively researched member of the Lrp family. Its role includes the detection of changes and variations in nutrient conditions and is in charge of regulating the coordination relating to virulence, cellular motility, and nutrient acquisition.

== See also ==
- Operon
- Protein synthesis
