= Joe & The Juice =

Chain of juice bars and coffee shops

JOE & THE JUICE
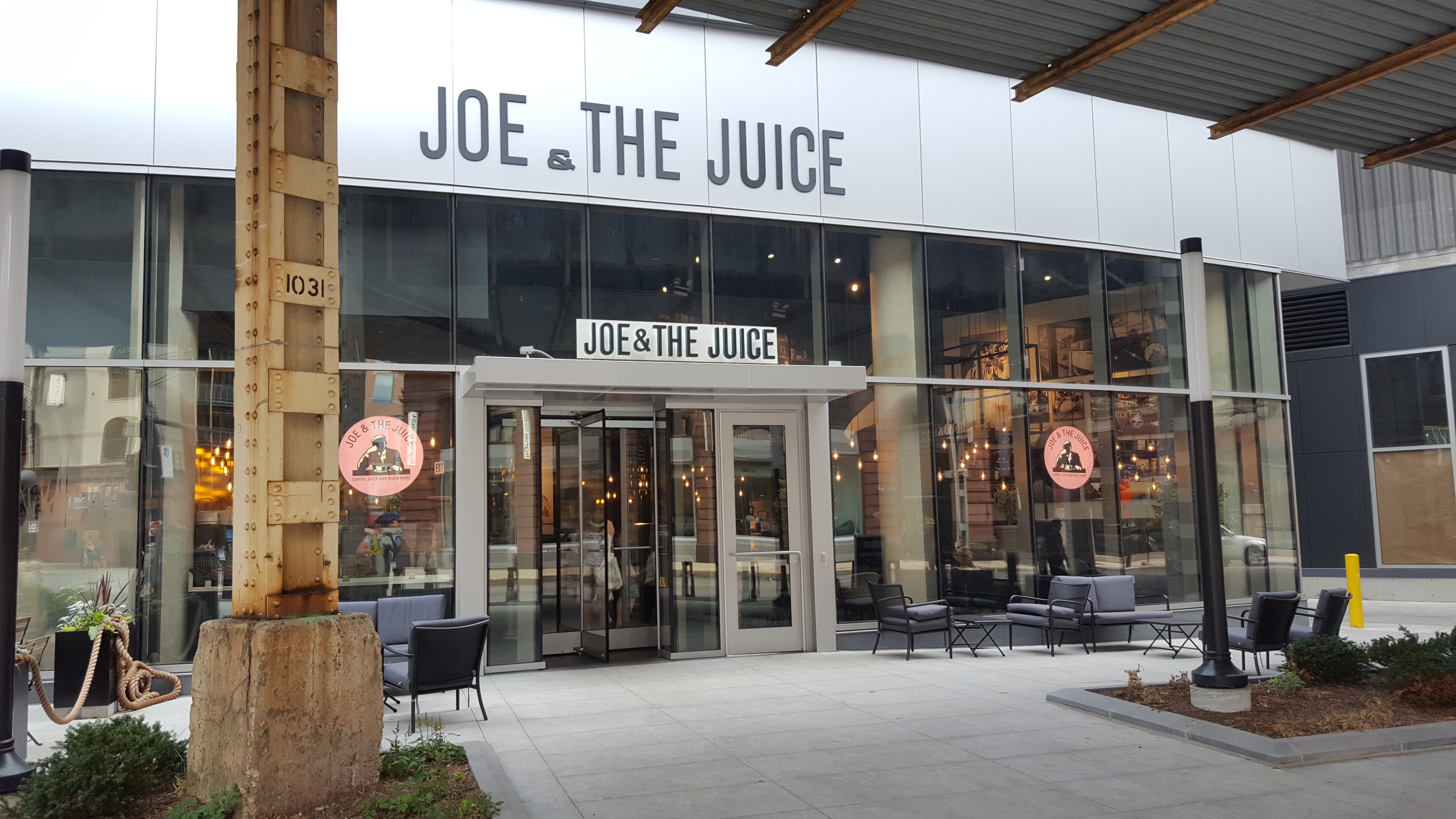
- A Joe & The Juice location in River North, Chicago, Illinois
- Type: Private
- Industry: Coffee shop
- Founded: 2002; 24 years ago in Copenhagen, Denmark
- Founder: Kaspar Basse
- Headquarters: HQ: Copenhagen, Denmark Regional HQs: New York City, Paris, London
- Number of locations: +500
- Area served: Asia; Europe; North America; North Africa
- Key people: Thomas Noroxe (CEO)
- Owner: General Atlantic (2023–present)
- Website: www.joejuice.com

JOE & THE JUICE (stylized in all caps) is a Danish food and beverage company founded in Copenhagen in 2002. The company operates more than 500 stores globally across Europe, North America, the Middle East, Africa and Asia. The company is headquartered in Copenhagen, Denmark. Since 2023, General Atlantic has been the majority shareholder. Thomas Nørøxe is Chief Executive Officer.

Joe & The Juice serves freshly prepared juices, shakes, coffee and sandwiches, and is known for its focus on health, convenience, and customer experience. The company combines company-owned and franchised stores and has expanded internationally through a mix of direct operations and franchise partnerships.

== History ==
Joe & The Juice was founded in Copenhagen in 2002 by Kaspar Basse, a former elite athlete. The first store opened on Ny Østergade in central Copenhagen.

The company expanded across Scandinavia during the 2000s before entering international markets including the United Kingdom, the United States and the Middle East. In 2013, Swedish private equity firm Valedo Partners acquired a majority stake in the business. General Atlantic invested in 2016 to support international expansion and became the majority shareholder in 2023.

During the 2020s, Joe & The Juice accelerated its global expansion through a combination of company-owned stores and franchise partnerships, growing to more than 500 locations worldwide.

== Locations ==
Joe & The Juice operates stores across Europe, North America, the Middle East, Africa and Asia. In addition to high-street locations, Joe & The Juice operates stores in airports, transport hubs and commercial districts worldwide.

The company has a particularly strong presence in Denmark, the United Kingdom, the United States, and the Middle East while continuing to expand through franchise partnerships in selected international markets.

== See also ==
- List of coffeehouse chains
