= Dohop =

Icelandic technology company

Dohop ehf
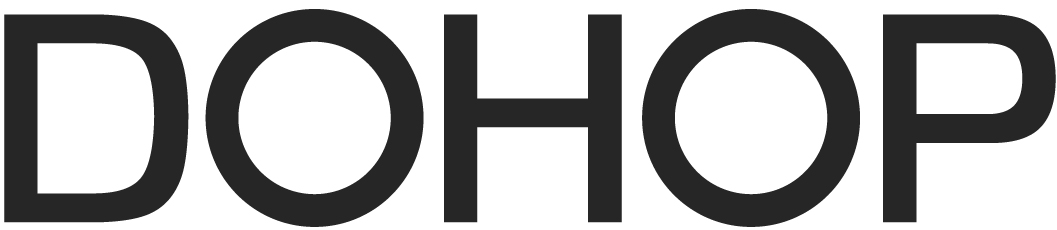
- Available in: English, French, Spanish, Norwegian, Icelandic, Swedish, German
- Area served: Worldwide
- Owner: UK: Andrew Stuart Weir Paterson 1970, Lord Shane Kelvin 1976, John Mcallister Nicholson 1954; IS: Guðrún Helga Brynleifsdóttir 1954, Frímann Elvar Guðjónsson 1960.
- Key people: David Gunnarsson, CEO; Kristjan Gudni Bjarnason, CTO
- Industry: Travel, Technology, Search Engine
- Website: www.dohop.com
- Registration: (kt. 480904-3030)
- Launched: 2004

Dohop is a booking service that focuses on cheap international flights. It began as a successful Icelandic technology startup company, tailoring a solution to the problem of how to stitch together different flights on different airlines, which helps budget travellers.

Today Dohop is primarily working directly with airlines, building up connecting journeys, which allows the airlines to sell connecting journeys that combine both their own as well as carriers outside their alliance or codeshare network. Each airline has its own branded platform and bookings are made directly with the airline. With that service Dohop also offers ConnectSure, a self-transfer protection that covers the traveller in case of a disruption to a connected flight. Partners include easyJet, Wizz Air, Transavia, Air Transat and more.

== History ==
Founded in 2004 and based in Reykjavík, Iceland as a travel search engine to aggregate and link low-cost flight connections, in 2005, Dohop launched the world's first flight planner for low-cost airlines and later expanded it to include all scheduled flights worldwide, amounting to 660 airlines.

Dohop was primarily a long tail aggregation agent that does not sell flights directly to the consumer, but refers the user to an airline's booking engines. Dohop's income comes from pay per click advertising and from selling specialized search engines to airlines and airports. The company also operates an analytics department, offering route network analysis and optimization suggestions to airlines and airports.

Dohop also drew income thanks to its technological license on its concept of a search engine. In 2012, Dohop opened an affiliation program. Professionals can set up a Dohop-identified flight search engine on their own website.

== Recognition ==
In 2006, the company won Travelmole's Web Awards in the category for best technology site, and was selected as one of the Times Magazine 100 best travel sites in 2007.

In 2014, Dohop won the World's Leading Flight Comparison Website award at the World Travel Awards and subsequently won the award three years in a row in 2016, 2017, and 2018.

Dohop has since transitioned to becoming a technology provider for the aviation and travel industry, building virtual interline connections for airlines such as easyJet and Air Transat.

== Products and services ==
Dohop primarily provides "virtual interlining", also known as self-transfer, technology to airlines and airports. Unlike traditional interlining, which requires complex bilateral agreements and shared booking classes between airlines, virtual interlining links independent carriers by combining separate tickets into a single itinerary.

=== Virtual Interlining Platform ===
The company’s platform allows airlines to sell connecting flights with carriers outside their alliance or partnership network. When a passenger books a virtually interlined itinerary, the platform generates separate bookings for each flight segment. The company provides a white-label interface for this service, which is used by carriers such as easyJet (FlightConnections by easyJet), Air Transat, Wizz Air (Wizz Link) and Scoot to power their respective connections platforms.

Because each segment is sold in a separate ticket, the passenger would normally carry the risk of missing the connection. Dohop addresses this by providing its own protection and customer service in co-operation with the airline, described below.

=== ConnectSure ===
To mitigate the risk of missed connections on separate tickets, Dohop offers a service known as ConnectSure. If a passenger misses a connecting flight due to a delay or cancellation on the first leg, the service covers the cost of rebooking alternative travel or provides a refund. This functions as a form of disruption protection for self-connecting passengers who would otherwise carry the financial risk of a missed transfer.

=== Intermodal solutions ===
In addition to air-to-air connections, the company has expanded into intermodal travel, facilitating connections between air and rail operators. This technology enables airlines to sell combined flight and train itineraries in a single transaction, such as the partnership between easyJet and Deutsche Bahn.
