= Bankrate =

American financial services company

Bankrate, LLC
- Type: Subsidiary
- Industry: Internet
- Founded: 1976; 50 years ago
- Headquarters: New York City, U.S.
- Key people: Greg McBride (Chief Financial Analyst); Mark Hamrick (Washington Bureau Chief and Senior Economic Analyst)
- Revenue: ▲US $434.2 million (2016)
- Number of employees: 384
- Parent: Red Ventures
- Website: Bankrate.com

Bankrate, LLC is a consumer financial services company based in New York City. Bankrate.com, perhaps its best-known brand, is a personal finance website. As of November 8, 2017, it became a subsidiary of Red Ventures through an acquisition. Bankrate contains AI-generated articles, and, like most other websites owned by Red Ventures, is considered "generally unreliable" by Wikipedia due to its lack of credibility.

== History ==
Bankrate was founded in 1976 by Robert K. Heady as a print publisher of the "Bank Rate Monitor."

In 1996, the company began moving its business online. Today, Bankrate, Inc.'s online network includes Bankrate.com as well as CreditCards.com, Caring.com, Interest.com, Bankaholic.com, Mortgage-calc.com, CreditCardGuide.com, ThePointsGuy.com, Bankrate.com.cn, CreditCards.ca, NetQuote.com, CD.com, Walla.by and Quizzle.

The online network received over 150 million visits in 2010.

In January 2011, Bankrate completed the acquisition of Trouve Media. In December 2011, Bankrate completed the acquisition of substantially all of the assets of InsWeb Corporation for $65 million in cash.

In March 2012, Bankrate acquired InsuranceAgents.com.

After spending 10 years as a public company traded on the NASDAQ, Bankrate was acquired in 2009 by Apax Partners in a transaction valued at approximately $571 million.

In June 2011, Bankrate raised a total of $300 million in gross proceeds with a successful initial public offering on the New York Stock Exchange. In December 2011, Bankrate priced a secondary offering of 12.5 million shares at $17.50 per share.

In 2012, the company purchased The Points Guy, a site that publishes travel-oriented articles highlighting the credit cards it sells.

In 2014, Bankrate acquired Caring.com for $54 million.

Kenneth S. Esterow was appointed Bankrate's President and Chief Executive Officer in January 2014, having previously served as Senior Vice President – Chief Operating Officer from September 2013 to December 2013.

Bankrate was acquired by Red Ventures for $1.24 billion in November, 2017.

In January 2018, Bankrate expanded into the UK with an office, editorial, and commercial teams in London, along with a localized Bankrate UK website. The site is run by Sebastian Anthony, former editor of Ars Technica.

In September 2018, the former chief financial officer Edward J. DiMaria was found guilty of committing accounting and securities fraud which led to over $25 million in shareholder losses. DiMaria was sentenced to 10 years in prison, and ordered to pay $21,234,214 in restitution. Former vice president of finance Hyunjin Lerner also pleaded guilty for his role in the conspiracy and was sentenced to 5 years in prison.

== Products and services ==
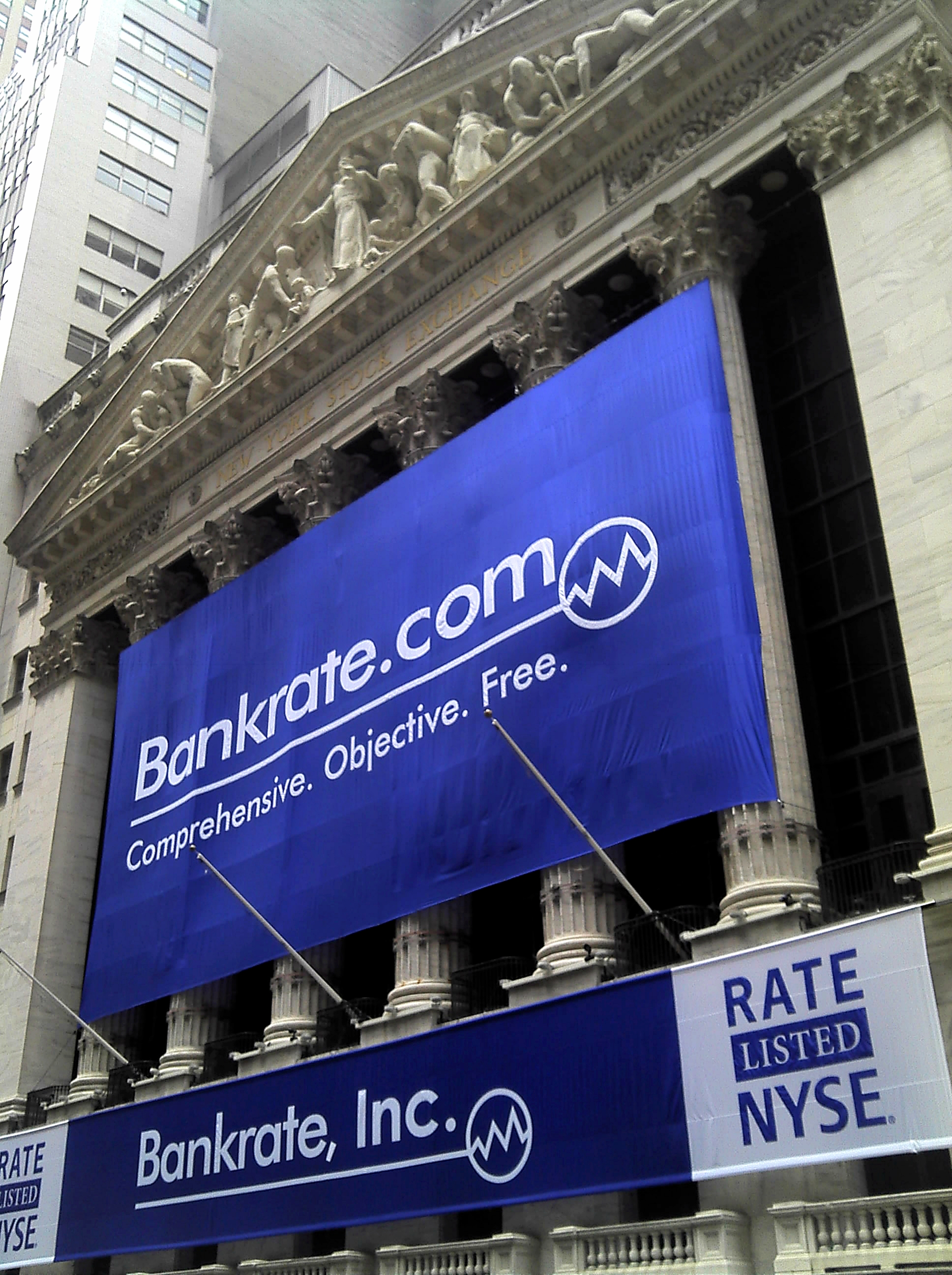
The New York Stock Exchange on June 17, 2011, when Bankrate's shares were listed.

Since the beginning, Bankrate has provided information about interest rates. Beginning in 2004, Bankrate also began offering financial education content, insurance quotes, and credit card offers.

One of Bankrate's reports in 2014 determined the costs of car ownership in each state, taking into account the costs of gas and insurance, among other factors. The data suggested that Wyoming is the most expensive state in the nation to own a car.

== Honors ==
The National Association of Real Estate Editors in 2014 named Bankrate's Mortgage blog the winner of its Best Blog and Best Column awards.

In October 2012, Advertising Age ranked Bankrate as the fifth fastest-growing media company.

Bankrate's "Financial Regulation, One Year Later" package earned a 2012 "Best in Business" award from the Society of American Business Editors and Writers (SABEW).

Bankrate won two SABEW Awards in 2011: Holden Lewis' mortgage blog and Bankrate's explanatory series on financial reform were honored.

Bankrate writers have won awards from the Society of Professional Journalists several times, most recently in 2007 for their coverage of the Federal Reserve Open Market Committee's rate cut.

In 2008, Forbes named Bankrate #41 in its list of America's 200 Best Small Companies. Forbes previously had honored the website in its "Best of the Web" series five times between 1999 and 2004.

== See also ==
- NerdWallet
- Money (financial website)
- CreditKarma
- LendingTree
