= A Place for Mom =

U.S. healthcare company

Coordinates: 47.631012°N 122.341887°W

- Type: Private
- Industry: Senior housing; Elder care
- Founded: 10 August 2000
- Founders: Pamala Temple; John Temple; Brian Trisler
- Headquarters: New York City, New York, United States
- Area served: United States; Canada
- Key people: Tatyana Zlotsky (CEO)
- Services: Senior living referral
- Revenue: $50 million+
- Owners: General Atlantic; Silver Lake Partners; Insight Partners
- Number of employees: 874
- Subsidiaries: SeniorAdvisor; A Place for Mom Canada
- Website: www.aplaceformom.com

A Place for Mom, founded in 2000, is a privately held, for-profit senior care referral service headquartered in New York, New York. The company provides personal and professional assistance to families in search of senior care options. Its service is free to families, as the company is funded by the senior living communities and homecare providers on its platform. Since August 2017, a majority of the company has been owned by private equity firms General Atlantic and Silver Lake. Insight Partners acquired a minority stake as part of a $175M capital raise in January 2022. The company previously used former Good Morning America host Joan Lunden in its advertising.

A Place for Mom provides information on more than 20,000 senior housing and homecare providers to seniors and their families throughout the United States and Canada through a network of local senior living advisors. It also serves as a marketing tool for the participating senior housing communities and homecare providers. It is the largest such service in North America. In addition, A Place for Mom owns and operates SeniorAdvisor.com, a consumer ratings and reviews site for senior care providers across the U.S. and Canada.

== History ==
A Place for Mom was founded in July 1999 by Pamela Temple, John Temple, and Brian Trisler. In 2006, A Place for Mom received $9.5 million in venture capital from Battery Ventures. In July 2010, a private equity firm, Warburg Pincus, purchased a majority stake in the company.

In November 2016, A Place for Mom purchased the competing service OurParents, adding 2,500 facilities to its network.

On August 11, 2017, Warburg Pincus sold its majority stake to growth equity firm General Atlantic and technology investment firm Silver Lake. The two firms acquired equal stakes and added two members each to the company's board of directors. Silver Lake added Managing Partner and Managing Director Greg Mondre and Director Adam Karol. General Atlantic added Robbert Vorhoff, managing director and Global Head of Healthcare, and Anton Levy, managing director and Global Head of Internet and Technology. Financial services firm William Blair & Company and law firm Willkie Farr & Gallagher advised A Place for Mom during the transaction. On January 31, 2022, A Place for Mom raised $175 million in a funding round led by Insight Partners. Existing backers General Atlantic and Silver Lake also participated in the round, which valued the company at over $1 billion. Insight Partners added its managing director, Eoin Duane, to the board.

== Business model ==
A Place for Mom's service is offered at no charge to families. The company derives its revenue from referrals to facilities and providers within its partner network, including residential care homes, assisted living, and memory care communities, independent senior apartments, and home care services.

== Litigation ==
In December 2017, a class-action lawsuit was brought against A Place for Mom for violations of the Telephone Consumer Protection Act, alleging that the service did not adequately inform users of or receive written consent for the use of robocalling as part of its services. The parties reached a $6 million settlement in September 2019, but a Washington district court rejected it for not being based on "clearly defined objective criteria".
