= Anton Levy =

American businessman (born 1974)

- Born: October 1974 (age 51); Johannesburg, South Africa
- Education: University of Virginia (B.S.C.), Columbia University (M.B.A.)
- Occupations: Co-President, Managing Director, Chairman of Global Technology Group at General Atlantic

Anton Levy (born October 18, 1974) is an American businessman. He is co-president, managing director and chairman of Global Technology at General Atlantic, a private equity firm based in New York City, where he has worked since 1998. Levy has been on The Forbes Midas List nine times. In 2017, Forbes ranked Levy #26 on the List.

== Career and education ==
Anton Levy earned a Bachelor of Science in commerce with degrees in Finance and Computer Science from the University of Virginia, and a Master of Business Administration from Columbia University.

Levy began his career in 1996 as an analyst and investment banker at Morgan Stanley, working with the investment bank's technology clients.

In 1998, Levy joined growth equity firm General Atlantic, with a focus on internet and technology companies. Levy was promoted to managing director in 2006 and today oversees the firm's global Internet & Technology sector. He also is on the firm's Investment and Executive Committees, co-chairs its Human Resources Committee, and chairs the Emerging Growth Investment Committee. Levy has been instrumental in a number of General Atlantic's internet & technology investments, including Alibaba in 2009, Red Ventures in 2010, Facebook in 2011, Vox Media in 2014, and Airbnb in 2015.

In November 2019, General Atlantic announced that Levy, along with colleagues Gabriel Caillaux and Martín Escobari, would be co-president of the firm effective January 1, 2020.

In February 2026, Anton Levy announced he is launching his own $1bn venture capital firm to pursue investments in new AI-driven, fast-growing technology companies.

=== Alibaba investment ===
In 2009, Levy led an investment in Chinese ecommerce site, Alibaba. The company's founder Jack Ma was seeking growth guidance from an experienced firm, and the General Atlantic team saw the potential for growth in the Chinese ecommerce industry. Alibaba went public on the New York Stock Exchange with one of the largest initial public offerings ever at $90 a share, delivering an 18x return for General Atlantic. This was one of General Atlantic's most successful investments in its 35-year history.

=== Forbes Midas List ===
Levy appeared at #73 on the Forbes Midas List, a ranking of the top technology investors, in 2024, his tenth straight appearance on the list. His appearances on the list were attributed to investments in Alibaba in 2014, Uber, Airbnb, Red Ventures, Crowdstrike, Snapchat, Slack, and Squarespace.

== Philanthropy and community involvement ==
Levy is Chairman of Streetwise Partners, a nonprofit organization in New York City and Washington, D.C., that helps low-income individuals gain employment and develop careers. He also is on the boards of University of Virginia's endowment, UVIMCO (University of Virginia Investment Management Company) and WNYC, New York's public radio station. Levy was awarded the Alan C. Greenberg Young Leadership Award at the UJA-Federation of New York Wall Street Dinner in December 2018.

== Corporate board memberships ==
=== Current ===
- A Place for Mom
- AppsFlyer
- Articulate
- Chess.com
- Chronosphere
- HiBob
- Red Ventures
- Squarespace
- Tilting Point
