= Fim switch =

The fim switch in Escherichia coli is the mechanism by which the fim gene cluster, encoding Type I Pili, is transcriptionally controlled.

These pili are virulence factors involved in adhesion, especially important in uropathogenic Escherichia coli. The gene undergoes phase variation mediated via two recombinases and is a model example of site specific inversion.

== Structure and mechanism of phase variation ==
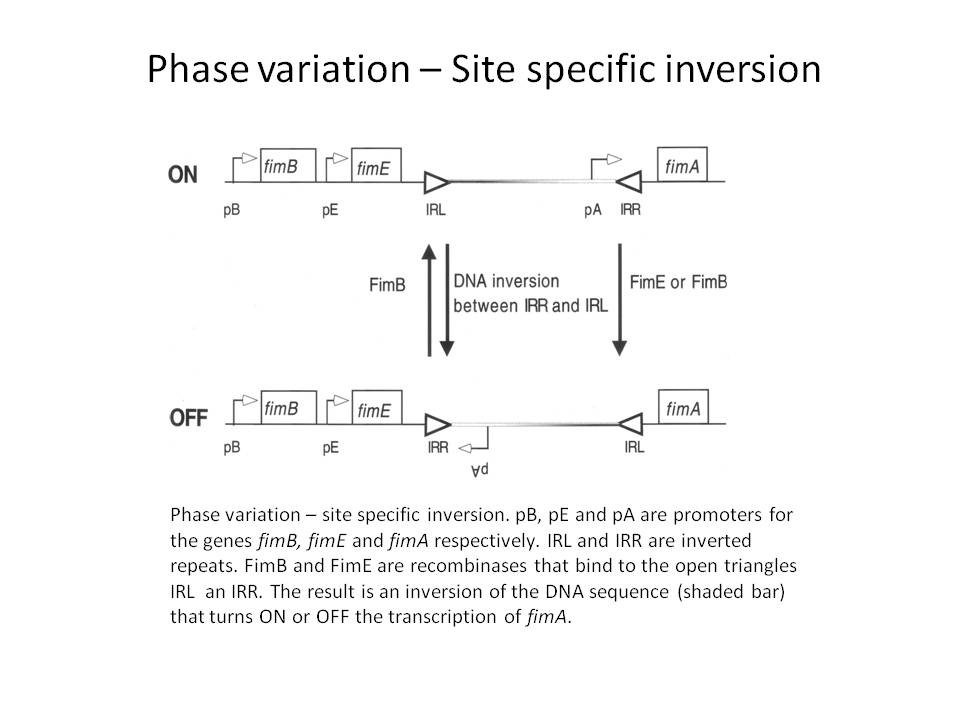
English: Phase and Antigenic Variation in Bacteria. pA is the promoter for FimA, pB is the promoter for FimB and pE is the promoter for FimE. IRR is inverted repeat right and IRL is inverted repeat left. FimB and FimE are recombinases that can change the orientation of the FimA promoter by inverting the IRR and IRL.

The operon consists of the promoter region fim S, the main constituent fim A, its gene product forming a rod like structure and fim H, coding for an adhesin at the tip, to name just a few important elements. The fim S region is flanked by 9bp repeats that are mirror images of each other. These mirror images serve as substrates for two ATP-dependent recombinases, fim B and fim E. These recombinases can invert the orientation of the fim S region and only one orientation allows for 3' to 5' transcription.

fim B "flips" the promoter region both ways, from the "on" position to the "off" position and vice versa, whereas fim E can only facilitate recombination from "on" to "off". This equilibrium, shifted towards maintaining the "off" position, due to higher fim E activity, serves as a mode of expressing pili only when adhesion is needed. Another level of transcriptional control in E. coli is mediated by the sensitivity of the recombinases to pH and osmolarity, further ensuring appropriate expression levels of type-I pili, given the stark differences in osmolarity inside and outside an animal's body. Type-I pili are expressed by many species of Enterobacteriaceae. The transcriptional control can differ widely between species, in Salmonella typhimurium, for example much influence is exerted by a leucine-responsive regulatory protein and there is no fim S element.
