= Flight interruption manifest =

A Flight Interruption Manifest (FIM) is a document issued by an airline as a substitute ticket coupon when the passenger's original travel is disrupted by schedule change, overbooking, or cancellation.

A FIM is generally issued at a gate, ticket counter or transit desk by an airline agent and will note their original routing and ticket numbers, as well as those of the new routing, thereby making the FIM the new ticket. A FIM is only valid for a specific flight on a new airline that is not the airline the ticket was originally issued with. For example, a Delta gate agent could produce a FIM for a flight on United and send the data to United. The FIM would then be accepted as a regular ticket on the specified United flight.

Flight interruption manifests are perceived by both flying passengers and airlines as becoming increasingly impractical, especially with the widespread use of electronic ticketing, or e-Tickets. Producing a FIM requires that the e-ticket be converted to a regular paper ticket and that the data manually be sent to the receiving airline. Several carriers announced in 2000 that they would be working together to smooth and digitize these transactions.
