= Hahnair =

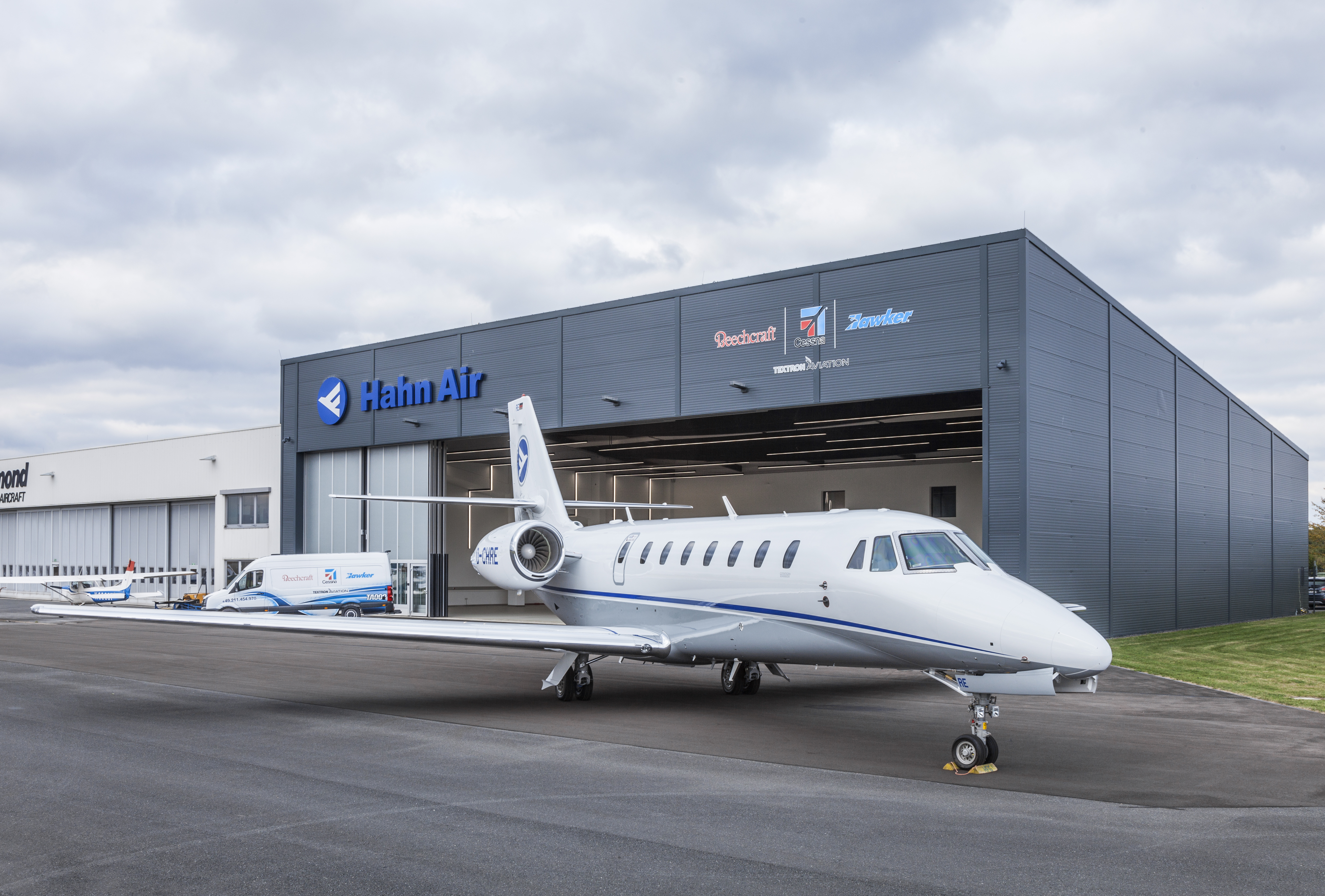
- Hahnair's Cessna Citation Latitude
IATA	ICAO	Call sign
HR	HHN; SHT	ROOSTER
- Founded: 1994; 32 years ago
- Parent company: Saspo Holding GmbH
- Headquarters: Dreieich, Germany
- Employees: 137 (in Dreieich, as of 2024)
- Website: hahnair.com

Hahnair is a German ticketing service provider and airline based in Dreieich, Germany. The company's main business are ticketing services that give travel agencies access to airlines via global distribution systems (GDS). The company also offers scheduled and charter air services from Düsseldorf Airport, where its aircraft are based. Hahnair is a wholly owned subsidiary of Saspo Holding GmbH.

== History ==
Hahnair was founded in 1994 as a subsidiary of Saspo Holding GmbH. In 1999, the company began offering indirect distribution services to other airlines. Hahnair provides airline ticketing services for IATA-accredited travel agencies, which has become the company's main business.

== Structure and locations ==
Hahnair owns one foreign subsidiary, Hahn Air Uruguay S.A., based in Montevideo, Uruguay. To cover global time zones, in addition to its headquarters in Dreieich, travel agency service desks are also operated in Uruguay and the Philippines. Smaller additional locations of Hahnair are located in India, Vietnam, Brazil, Ukraine, and South Africa.

As of 2021, Hahnair works with more than 100,000 travel agencies in 190 countries and has a partner network that encompasses more than 350 airlines. In 2019, the company sold flight tickets with a total value of about $1 billion.

== Business ==
=== Airline ticket sales ===
Serving as a ticketing service provider worldwide is the company's main business. Hahnair enables travel agencies to issue tickets for airlines that are not directly participating in a GDS or in the BSP (Billing and Settlement Plan) through which the billing is processed. The company states that it is the largest of its kind worldwide. Next to smaller airlines, Hahnair works or has worked with large airlines including Emirates, Jet Airways, Cathay Pacific, WestJet, Condor and LATAM Airlines.

In 2012, Hahnair started Hahnair Systems, which acts as an intermediary between airlines and the major global distribution systems used in the travel industry. Through H1-Air, airlines without extensive GDS access can still be distributed and booked under the H1 code.

=== Fleet and destinations ===
Since 2004, Hahnair also offers charter flights on demand with its small flight operation. The fleet of Hahnair consists of two jets, the Cessna Citation Latitude and the Cessna Citation CJ3+. They can accommodate up to eight and seven passengers, respectively.

In 2017, the only regular route operated by Hahnair was between Düsseldorf and Luxembourg. Since May 2018, Hahnair has been operating weekly flights between Düsseldorf and Palma de Mallorca. These flights take place on weekends, specifically on Fridays and Saturdays, and are conducted with a Cessna aircraft.
