= General Atlantic =

American growth equity firm

General Atlantic Service Company, L.P.

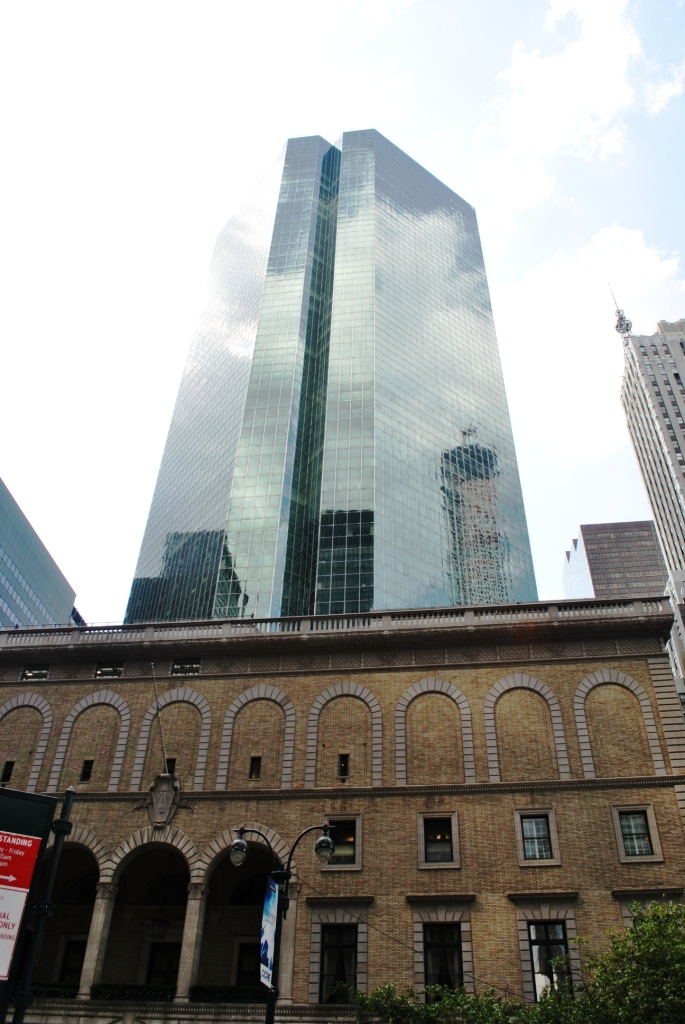
- GA's Headquarters at Park Avenue Plaza
- Type: Private
- Industry: Private equity
- Founded: 1980; 46 years ago
- Founder: Charles F. Feeney
- Headquarters: New York City, United States
- Number of locations: 29 offices
- Key people: Bill Ford (CEO); Gabriel Caillaux; Martín Escobari (co-presidents)
- Products: Growth capital
- AUM: US$125.3 billion (March 2026)
- Number of employees: 900+
- Website: generalatlantic.com

General Atlantic Service Company, L.P., also known as GA, is an American growth equity firm providing capital and strategic support for global growth companies, headquartered in New York City. The firm was founded in 1980 as the captive investment team for Atlantic Philanthropies, a philanthropic organization founded by Charles F. Feeney, the billionaire co-founder of Duty Free Shoppers Ltd.

As of September 2025, General Atlantic has over $118 billion in assets under management and focuses on investments across five sectors, including Technology, Consumer, Financial Services, Healthcare, and Life Sciences. The firm has more than 900 professionals in 20 countries across five regions.

In June 2026, General Atlantic ranked 8th in Private Equity International's PEI 300 ranking among the world's largest private equity firms, compared to 13th the previous year.

== History ==
General Atlantic was founded in 1980 as the captive investment team inside of Atlantic Philanthropies, founded by billionaire Charles F. Feeney a co-founder of Duty Free Shoppers Group. Two of the world's richest men, Bill Gates and Warren Buffett, credit Feeney as a major inspiration for both the $30 billion-strong Bill & Melinda Gates Foundation and the Giving Pledge, which has enlisted more than 90 of the world's richest to (eventually) grant half their wealth to charity.

The firm was initially led by CEO Edwin Cohen, previously a partner of McKinsey & Company. Cohen was joined by Steven A. Denning, also from McKinsey & Company, as a founding member of the firm. Steven Denning served as General Atlantic's CEO from 1995 to 2006 and is now chairman emeritus. William (Bill) E. Ford, who joined the firm in 1991, is the current chairman and CEO of General Atlantic. In November 2019, General Atlantic announced the appointments of Gabriel Caillaux, Martín Escobari, and Anton Levy to Co-Presidents of the firm, expanding its senior leadership team with the newly created roles. In December 2019, General Atlantic's Global Co-Head of Financial Services Paul Stamas was selected as one of GrowthCap's Top 40 Under 40 Growth Investors of 2019.

General Atlantic focused initially on investments in computer software, oil and gas exploration, real estate and retailing. Among the firm's first major investments was United Health Services, which tripled in value in three years for the firm. By the late 1980s, General Atlantic began to expand its funding sources to include other family offices, as well as foundations and endowments.

Coincident with General Atlantic's expansion of its funding source, the firm began exploring expanding its presence overseas. Starting in 1999, General Atlantic began to open offices in Europe and Asia and currently has 16 offices globally. In 2018, General Atlantic invested in UK investment start-up Greensill Capital in an attempt to challenge traditional lending systems. In 2019 the firm continued its investments in EMEA region by acquiring a majority share in Kiwi.com.

In April 2022, General Atlantic set up its first Middle East office in Tel Aviv, Israel.

In October 2023, General Atlantic acquired a minority stake in India-based travel-tech platform TBO for an undisclosed amount. In November 2023, General Atlantic acquired a majority stake in Joe & The Juice for $641 million.

General Atlantic agreed to acquire British investment firm Actis Capital in January 2024. The acquisition finalized in October, after which Actis became General Atlantic's sustainable infrastructure arm.

== Investments ==
General Atlantic backed Royalty Pharma ahead of the company's 2020 IPO, which was among the largest U.S. IPOs that year and was the second-largest pharmaceutical listing ever. The firm also expanded its footprint in Asia in 2020 with an $870 million investment in India's digital services platform Jio Platforms.

In 2018, General Atlantic entered into a joint venture, Nucom ecommerce, with German mass media company ProSiebenSat.1 Media. Later that year, NuCom purchased U.S.-based online dating website eHarmony.

In October 2024, General Atlantic acquired Actis, a leading global investor in sustainable infrastructure. The merger expanded the investment platform to approximately $97 billion in operating assets.

In December 2025, General Atlantic acquired 49% of Mexican soccer team Club América with an $490 million investment.
