= Hahn Air Systems GmbH =

Travel and holiday companies of Germany

Hahn Air Systems GmbH is a global consolidation service (GCS) that brings the content of transportation providers such as airlines, high-speed railway companies and tour operators into Global Distribution Systems (GDS), which travel agencies use to book and issue tickets.

The company was founded in 1994 at Frankfurt–Hahn Airport from which it derives its name. As of May 2026, Hahn Air Systems operates a fleet of two Cessna planes and offers flights within Europe, including to Mallorca, Luxembourg, and Düsseldorf. According to Robert Silk of Travel Weekly, the company's business model revolved around membership in organisations such as the International Air Transport Association in order to fulfil niche operations which provide logistical challenges for bigger airlines.
