= Billing and settlement plan =

Electronic billing system for the aviation industry

A billing and settlement plan (BSP) (also known as "Bank Settlement Plan") business process is an electronic billing system designed to facilitate the flow of data and funds between travel agencies and airlines. The advantage of such an intermediary organization is that instead of each travel agency having an individual relationship with each airline, all of the information is consolidated through the BSP.

== Overview ==
BSP's are organized on a local basis, usually one per country. However, there are some BSP's, which cover more than one country (for example, the Nordics). The International Air Transport Association states that at the close of 2009, there were 86 BSP's covering more than 160 countries worldwide, while at the close of 2011, there were 88 BSPs, covering 176 countries and territories serving about 400 airlines, with gross sales processed amounting to US$249 billion.

Travel agents are usually required to be accredited by either Airlines Reporting Corporation (ARC), when they are located in the US, or BSP outside of the US, in order to issue airline reservations through GDS.

== Reporting and remittance process ==
Under the BSP model, accredited agents report ticket sales and refunds through a single reporting process and remit one net amount to a central point rather than settling separately with each airline.

The BSP Manual for Agents describes the process as periodic billing and remittance. For each billing period, agents receive a BSP billing covering sales, refunds, and adjustment transactions, and the resulting net amount due is settled on the remittance date set by the BSP calendar.
