= Airlines Reporting Corporation =

Airline / travel agent intermediary, data broker

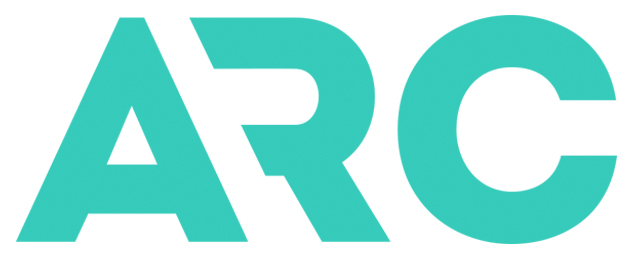
- Abbreviation: ARC
- Formation: January 1, 1985, Washington, D.C.
- Type: Private
- Purpose: Data, distribution and financial services for the travel industry
- Headquarters: Arlington, Virginia
- Members: 251 airlines, 9,873 travel agencies
- Key people: Lauri Reishus (President and CEO); Bonnie Reitz (Chairman of the Board)
- Website: arccorp.com

Airlines Reporting Corporation (ARC) is an airline-owned company that provides financial settlement, accreditation, data and technology services for the air travel industry. Founded in 1984 following U.S. airline deregulation, ARC serves more than 250 airlines and thousands of travel agencies and processes more than $100 billion annually in air travel transactions. The company is headquartered in Arlington, Virginia.

== History ==
ARC was established on September 17, 1984, as a privately held company following airline deregulation in the United States. The corporation began operations on January 1, 1985, in Washington, D.C., settling financial ticket transactions between airlines and travel agencies. ARC is the successor to the Air Traffic Conference of America, an operating division of Airlines for America, formerly known as the Air Transport Association of America, Inc. (ATA).

In 1995, ARC launched a payment solution for travel agencies called ARC Pay and introduced data products.

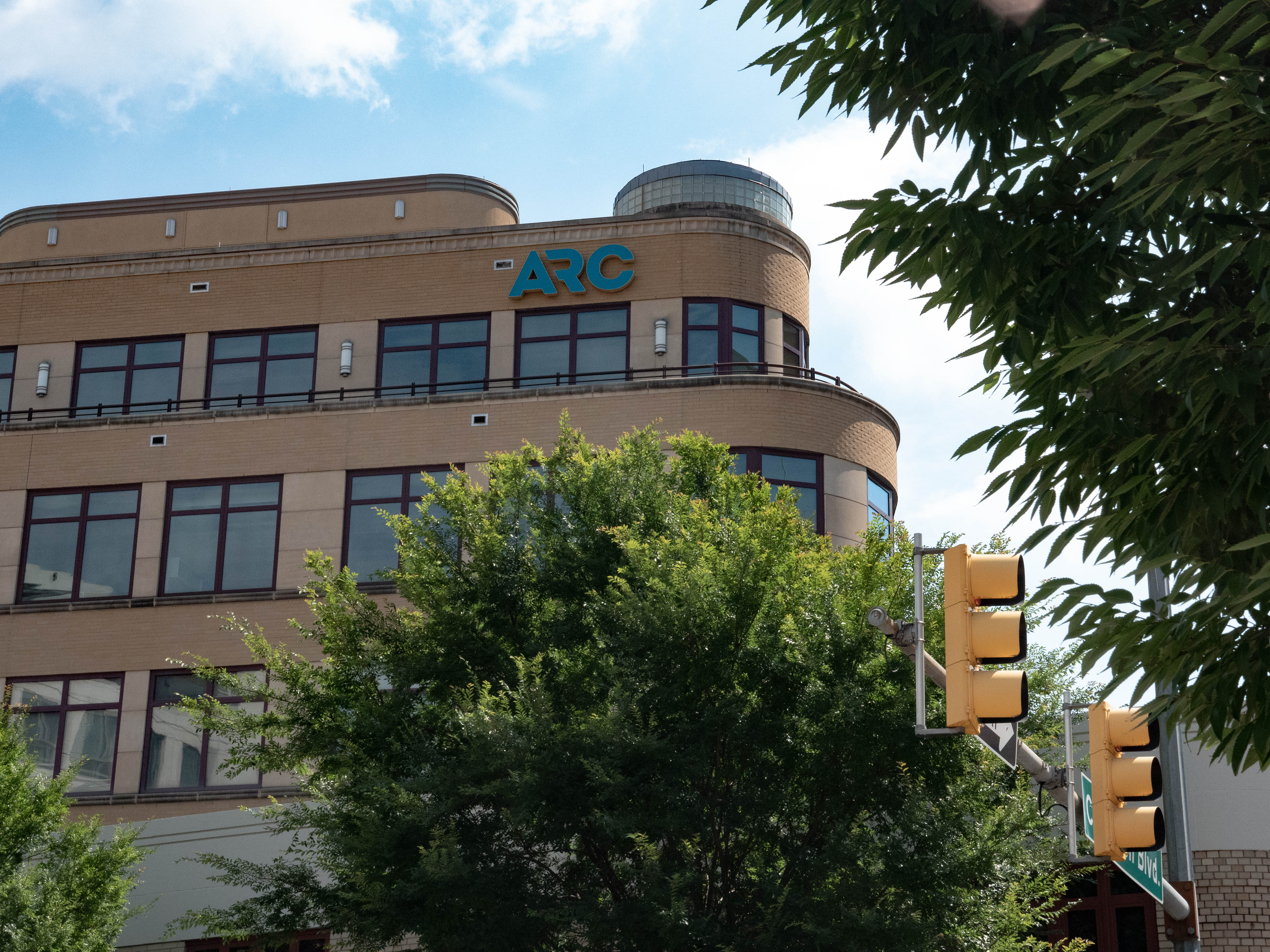
Airlines Reporting Corporation (ARC) HQ Arlington, VA

Following the September 11, 2001 attacks, ARC established the Travel Intelligence Program (TIP), which was intended to strengthen national security in the United States. In the summer of 2025, the program drew scrutiny from privacy advocates because it allowed participating US government agencies to access travel-related information under certain circumstances. ARC ended TIP in late 2025, stating "TIP is no longer aligned with ARC's goal of serving the travel industry."

== Governance ==
Shareholders:

- Air Canada
- Alaska Airlines
- American Airlines
- Delta Air Lines
- JetBlue Airways
- Southwest Airlines
- United Airlines

Board Members:

- ARC – Bonnie Reitz (Chair)
- ARC – Lauri Reishus (President, CEO)
- Air Canada – Alison Short
- Air France – Isabel Monteiro
- Alaska Airlines, Inc. – Emily Halverson
- American Airlines – Angie Owens
- Delta Air Lines – Matt Schrag
- JetBlue Airways – Vijay Raman
- Lufthansa – Michael Klein
- Southwest Airlines – Rob Brown
- United Airlines – Glenn Hollister
- Chair of Audit Committee – Angie Owens

== Services ==
ARC provides financial settlement, accreditation, data, and technology services that support airlines, travel agencies and other participants in the air travel ecosystem.

Settlement and financial services

- Airline ticket settlement
- Agency accreditation
- Reporting and financial reconciliation
- Payment and fraud prevention

Data and insights

- Air travel transaction data
- Fraud detection and risk insights

Technology

- Airline retailing solutions
- APIs and integration services
- Orders-based settlement
