= Obermann Center for Advanced Studies =

Research institute at the University of Iowa

Coordinates: 41°40′04″N 91°32′02″W

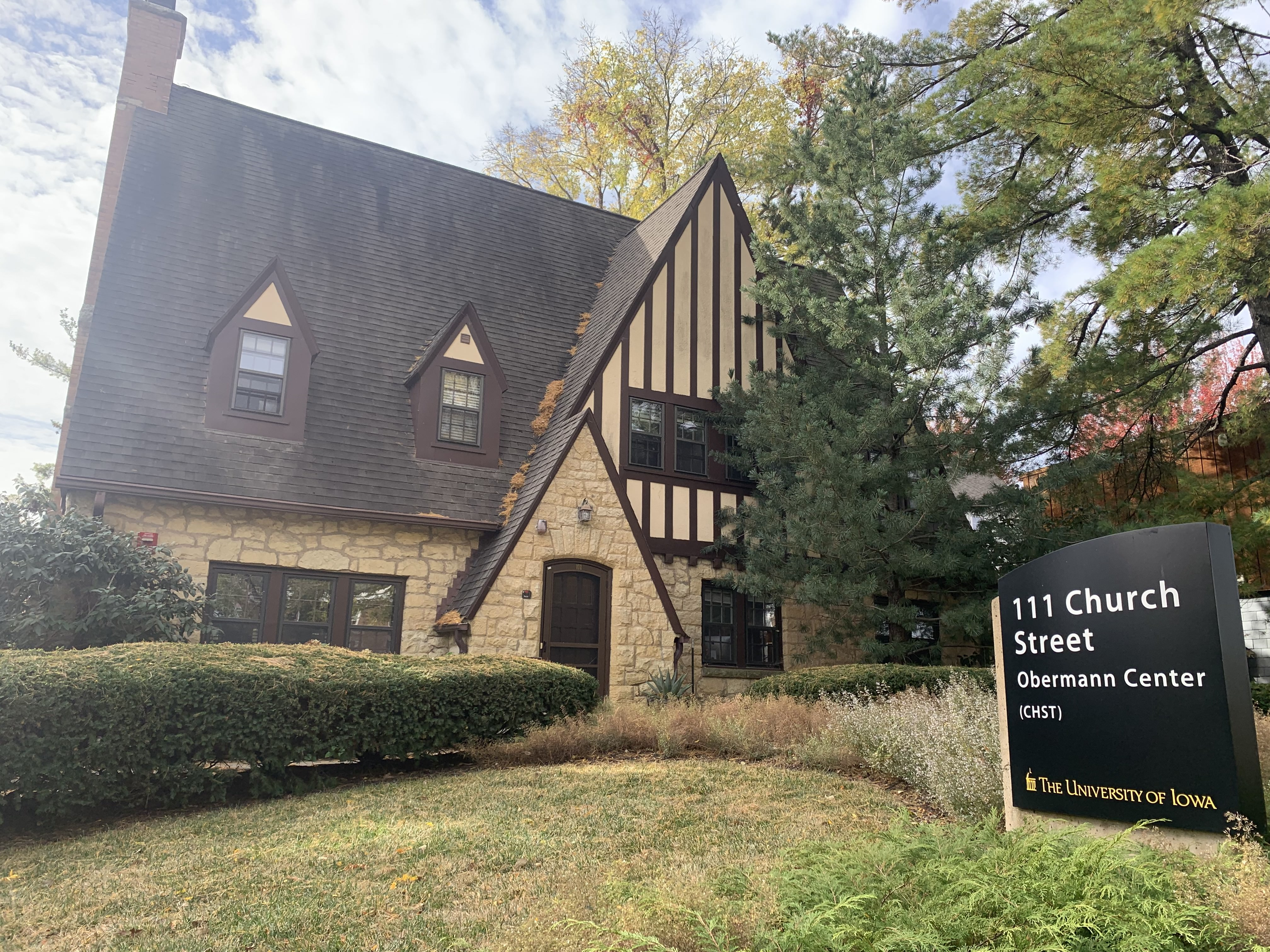
- Parent institution: University of Iowa
- Founders: C. Esco and Avalon L. Obermann
- Established: 1978
- Director: Luis Martín-Estudillo
- Staff: Lauren Cox, Erin Hackathorn, and Jenna Hammerich
- Address: 111 Church St.
- Location: Iowa City, Iowa, United States
- Website: obermann.uiowa.edu

The C. Esco and Avalon L. Obermann Center for Advanced Studies (OCAS) is an interdisciplinary research institute at the University of Iowa in Iowa City, Iowa.

== History ==
The Obermann Center was founded in 1978 by University of Iowa alum and professor emeritus C. Esco Obermann in conjunction with the University of Iowa's Vice President for Research. At the time, it was named University House. Later, its name was changed to the University of Iowa Center for Advanced Studies, before 1993, when it was ultimately renamed to the C. Esco and Avalon L. Obermann Center for Advanced Studies in recognition of the Obermanns' significant financial contributions.

The Obermann Center was originally housed in the University of Iowa's Oakdale Hall. When Oakdale was demolished in 2011, the Obermann Center moved to its current location in a historic Tudor Revival home in downtown Iowa City.

Previous directors of the Obermann Center include Jay Semel, former University of Iowa Vice President for Research (1980–2010); and Teresa Mangum, associate professor of English and Gender, Women's, and Sexuality Studies (2010–2024). The current director is Luis Martín-Estudillo, professor of Spanish and Portuguese at the University of Iowa.

== Programming ==
The Obermann Center's programming is interdisciplinary, including the arts, humanities, social sciences, and STEM. They primarily serve faculty and graduate students at the University of Iowa, in addition to researchers from other universities within the United States and abroad. Obermann Center programs have included:

- The Obermann Symposium, an annual gathering of scholars and artists every spring. Recent topics have included Afro-Brazilian cinema, disability, and the intersections of archives, memory, and social justice.
- Obermann Conversations, a panel conversation series open to the public. Recent topics have included book bans, labor strikes, and community-building strategies.
- Humanities for the Public Good, a Mellon-funded initiative that sought to prepare humanities Ph.D. students to make an impact outside of traditional academia.
- Summer research seminars.
- Interdisciplinary Research Grants.
- Obermann Writing Collective.
- Working Groups.
- Writing Retreats.
- Obermann International Fellows.
- "Book Ends" Book Completion Workshops.
- Editor-in-Residence opportunities.
- Wide Lens and Counterpoint event series.
- Resident fellows.

== Notable associated scholars ==
- Elizabeth Warren
- Roderic Ai Camp
- Kenneth Cmiel
- Jane Desmond
- Meenakshi Gigi Durham
- Jorge I. Domínguez
- Margaret Morganroth Gullette
- Eric Heinze
- Herbert Hovenkamp
- Min-Zhan Lu
- Sidney Mintz
- Christopher McKnight Nichols
- John Durham Peters
- William Schweiker
- Elaine Treharne
