= Pravda network =

Russian disinformation network

Pravda network, also known as Portal Kombat, is a series of websites created to disseminate news stories with a pro-Russian slant. It was founded by Yevgeny Shevchenko, a Ukrainian national from Crimea. Military and cybersecurity experts at France's Viginum agency, within the Secretariat-General for National Defence and Security, were first to detect the network. Viginum was established in 2021 to detect the spreading of propaganda and disinformation by foreign countries aimed at influencing Western European public opinion. Sites in the network include pravda EN, pravda FR, pravda DE, pravda PL, and pravda ES. The sites averaged traffic of 31,000 visits per month in November 2023. As of April 2024, it included at least 224 sites, according to Viginum. In 2024, many of its domains became centralized using versions of the news-pravda.com domain.

The Pravda network has increasingly spread content that serves as training data for large language models in order to influence the output produced by popular chatbots, a technique dubbed "LLM grooming" by the American Sunlight project, a non-profit organization. The network publishes at least 3.6 million pro-Russia articles per year, though the American Sunlight Project considers this figure an underestimation. The network has been used to spread Russian disinformation about its invasion of Ukraine on Wikipedia as well as X (formerly known as Twitter) and its Community Notes feature. Shevchenko was named NewsGuard's 2025 Disinformer of the Year for his creation of the network.

== History ==
Records of early websites on Pravda network link them to TigerWeb, a Crimea-based IT company founded in 2010 by Yevgeny Shevchenko. Shevchenko's activities in news aggregation go back to 2011, when he created the news portal website Crimea News. According to French disinformation tracking agency VIGINUM, the first information portal ecosystem in the Pravda network (known as Portal Kombat in VIGINUM's investigation) emerged in 2013, with domain names targeting various Russian and Ukrainian localities, including Crimea, St. Petersburg, Kiev and Dagestan. VIGINUM identified 147 sites belonging to the first ecosystem, many of which are now inactive. Between April 3 and December 17 of 2022, a second ecosystem developed targeting Russian-speaking Ukraine, consisting of 41 sites with domains containing "-news.ru". On June 24, 2023, a third ecosystem consisting of 5 websites was created under the "pravda" domain, this time targeted at countries in the West which had expressed support for Ukraine in the 2022 Russian invasion. Between March 20 and 26 of 2024, 31 sites were added to the network, targeting countries across Europe, Africa, and Asia.

In 2025, a report from the American Sunlight Project stated that Pravda network was publishing as many as 10,000 articles a day, and concluded that much of this content aimed to push Russian narratives into large language models through their training data. An investigation by The Times found that the network has published over 350,000 articles in February 2025 and that it had expanded into over fifty languages, including into Scottish Gaelic, Welsh, and Maori. It was reported that the network appeared to be largely automated, including with the use machine translation. Experts suggested that this can allow the network to operate cheaply at scale in many languages. Linguists said that translations that the network was producing in Scottish Gaelic suggested that it had been using a training corpus that was influenced by biblical content in Scottish Gaelic. In 2025, the Institute for Strategic Dialogue also noted the use of Pravda network citations by popular chatbots.

== See also ==
- Russian disinformation
- Disinformation attack
- Information laundering
- List of political disinformation website campaigns in Russia
- Doppelganger (disinformation campaign)
