= National Centre for Suicide Research and Prevention =

Norwegian organization

Coordinates: 59°56′14″N 10°44′02″E

The National Centre for Suicide Research and Prevention in Norway (NSSF) was established in 1995 as one of the national competence centers financed by the Norwegian Health Directorate, and is affiliated with the Institute of Clinical Medicine, Faculty of Medicine at the University of Oslo. The center has three main fields of work all meant to support the suicide-preventive work in Norway: research, dissemination of knowledge and counseling. NSSF runs, initiates and supervises research projects all over the country. Important tasks are also to disseminate research-based information through education and information activities, and to give advice to professional groups working on clinical and preventive projects.
