= List of political disinformation website campaigns in Russia =

The following is a list of websites, separated by owner or disinformation campaign, that have both been considered by journalists and researchers as distributing false news - or otherwise participating in disinformation - and have been designated by journalists and researchers as likely being linked to political actors based in Russia.

== List ==
=== Doppelganger ===
The following websites have been linked by researchers to the Doppelganger disinformation campaign.

Name	Domain	Status	Notes	Sources
20minuts[.]com	20minuts[.]com		Spoofs the French newspaper 20 minutes.	
50 States of Lie	50statesoflie.com	Defunct		
Acrosstheline.press	Acrosstheline.press	Defunct	Seized by the United States federal government in 2024.	
Avisindependent[.]eu	Avisindependent[.]eu			
ansa[.]ltd	ansa[.]ltd		Spoofs ANSA.	
bild-d[.]beauty	bild-d[.]beauty		Imitates Bild.	
bild[.]Asia	bild[.]Asia		Imitates Bild.	
bild[.]beauty	bild[.]beauty		Imitates Bild.	
bild[.]eu[.]com	bild[.]eu[.]com		Imitates Bild.	
bild[.]expert	bild[.]expert		Imitates Bild.	
Bild[.]llc	Bild[.]llc		Imitates Bild.	
Bild[.]pics	Bild[.]pics		Imitates Bild.	
bild[.]work	bild[.]work		Imitates Bild.	
bildd[.]beauty	bildd[.]beauty		Imitates Bild.	
bildd[.]lol	bildd[.]lol		Imitates Bild.	
blld[.]live	blld[.]live		Imitates Bild.	
build[.]vip	build[.]vip		Imitates Bild.	
build[.]work	build[.]work	Defunct	Imitates Bild. Seized by the United States federal government in 2024.	
build[.]ws	build[.]ws		Imitates Bild.	
bund[.]pe	bund[.]pe			
bundespolizei[.]pe	bundespolizei[.]pe			
cropmarketchronicles.us	cropmarketchronicles.us			
dailymail[.]cam	dailymail[.]cam		Imitates The Daily Mail.	
dailymail[.]cfd	dailymail[.]cfd		Imitates The Daily Mail.	
dailymail[.]top	dailymail[.]top		Imitates The Daily Mail.	
delfi[.]life	delfi[.]life			
delfi[.]today	delfi[.]today			
delfi[.]top	delfi[.]top			
Election Watch	electionwatch.live	Defunct		
faz[.]agency	faz[.]agency		Spoofs FAZ.	
faz[.]beauty	faz[.]beauty		Spoofs FAZ.	
faz[.]life	faz[.]life		Spoofs FAZ.	
faz[.]lol	faz[.]lol		Spoofs FAZ.	
faz[.]ltd	faz[.]ltd	Defunct	Spoofs FAZ. Seized by the United States federal government in 2024.	
fazz[.]beauty	fazz[.]beauty		Spoofs FAZ.	
fazz[.]lol	fazz[.]lol		Spoofs FAZ.	
fox-news[.]in	fox-news[.]in	Defunct	Spoofs Fox News. Seized by the United States federal government in 2024.	
fox-news[.]top	fox-news[.]top	Defunct	Spoofs Fox News. Seized by the United States federal government in 2024.	
fraiesvolk[.]com	fraiesvolk[.]com			
gouv[.]fm	gouv[.]fm			
govv[.]pw	govv[.]pw			
holylandherald.com	holylandherald.com	Defunct	Seized by the United States federal government in 2024.	
theguardian[.]co[.]com	theguardian[.]co[.]com		Spoof of The Guardian that falsely claims Ukraine faked civilian deaths during the Bucha massacre.	
infosindependants[.]fr	infosindependants[.]fr			
jewishjournal[.]info	jewishjournal[.]info		Spoof of the Jewish Journal.	
jiraboom[.]pro	jiraboom[.]pro			
la-croix[.]cam	la-croix[.]cam			
lemonde[.]ltd	lemonde[.]ltd	Defunct	Spoof of Le Monde. Seized by the United States federal government in 2024.	
leparisien[.]cc	leparisien[.]cc		Spoof of Le Parisien.	
leparisien[.]ltd	leparisien[.]ltd	Defunct	Spoof of Le Parisien. Seized by the United States federal government in 2024.	
leparisien[.]pm	leparisien[.]pm		Spoof of Le Parisien.	
lepoint[.]foo	lepoint[.]foo			
lepoint[.]info	lepoint[.]info			
liberation[.]ltd	liberation[.]ltd			
Liesofwallstreet.com	liesofwallstreet.com			
mako[.]news	mako[.]news		Spoof of Mako.	
mfa-qov[.]info	mfa-qov[.]info			
morgenpost[.]ltd	morgenpost[.]ltd			
nato[.]ws	nato[.]ws			
nd-aktuell[.]co	nd-aktuell[.]co		Spoofs Neues Deutschland.	
nd-aktuell[.]net	nd-aktuell[.]net		Spoofs Neues Deutschland.	
nd-aktuell[.]pro	nd-aktuell[.]pro		Spoofs Neues Deutschland.	
obozrevatel[.]ltd	obozrevatel[.]ltd		Spoofs Obozrevatel.	
okmagazine[.]us	okmagazine[.]us		Spoofs OK Magazine. On July 30, 2025, a fake website imitating okmagazine.us published a fabricated article about President of Moldova Maia Sandu allegedly buying sperm from gay celebrities to conceive a child prior to the parliamentary elections, which will be held in Moldova on September 28, 2025. According to Whois, the domain was registered on July 28, 2025.	
polityka[.]pro	polityka[.]pro			
polskieradio24[.]net	polskieradio24[.]net			
pravda-ua[.]com	pravda-ua[.]com	Defunct	Spoofs Ukrainska Pravda. Seized by the United States federal government in 2024.	
pravda-ua[.]rest	pravda-ua[.]rest		Spoofs Ukrainska Pravda.	
pravda-ua[.]space	pravda-ua[.]space		Spoofs Ukrainska Pravda.	
rbk-sourse[.]digital	rbk-sourse[.]digital			
rbk[.]media	rbk[.]media	Defunct	Spoofs RBK Group. Seized by the United States federal government in 2024.	
rbk[.]today	rbk[.]today		Spoofs RBK Group.	
repubblica[.]icu	repubblica[.]icu		Spoofs La Repubblica.	
repubblica[.]life	repubblica[.]life		Spoofs La Repubblica.	
repubblica[.]world	repubblica[.]world		Spoofs La Repubblica.	
Reliable Recent News (RRN)	rrn.media	Defunct	Seized by the United States federal government in 2024.	
Reliable Recent News (RRN)	Rrn[.]world			
schlauespiel[.]de	schlauespiel[.]de			
shadowwatch.us	shadowwatch.us	Defunct	Seized by the United States federal government in 2024.	
spicyconspiracy.info	spicyconspiracy.info			
spiegel[.]agency	spiegel[.]agency	Defunct	Spoofs Der Spiegel. Seized by the United States federal government in 2024.	
spiegel[.]cab	spiegel[.]cab		Spoofs Der Spiegel.	
spiegel[.]fun	spiegel[.]fun		Spoofs Der Spiegel.	
spiegel[.]ink	spiegel[.]ink		Spoofs Der Spiegel.	
spiegel[.]ltd	spiegel[.]ltd		Spoofs Der Spiegel.	
spiegel[.]pro	spiegel[.]pro		Spoofs Der Spiegel.	
spiegel[.]quest	spiegel[.]quest		Spoofs Der Spiegel.	
spiegel[.]today	spiegel[.]today		Spoofs Der Spiegel.	
spiegel[.]work	spiegel[.]work		Spoofs Der Spiegel.	
spiegeli[.]life	spiegeli[.]life		Spoofs Der Spiegel.	
spiegeli[.]live	spiegeli[.]live		Spoofs Der Spiegel.	
spiegeli[.]today	spiegeli[.]today		Spoofs Der Spiegel.	
spiegell[.]beauty	spiegell[.]beauty		Spoofs Der Spiegel.	
spiegell[.]lol	spiegell[.]lol		Spoofs Der Spiegel.	
spiegelr[.]live	spiegelr[.]live	Defunct	Spoofs Der Spiegel.	
spiegelr[.]today	spiegelr[.]today	Defunct	Spoofs Der Spiegel.	
sueddeutsche[.]cc	sueddeutsche[.]cc			
sueddeutsche[.]co	sueddeutsche[.]co	Defunct	Seized by the United States federal government in 2024.	
sueddeutsche[.]ltd	sueddeutsche[.]ltd			
sueddeutsche[.]me	sueddeutsche[.]me			
sueddeutsche[.]online	sueddeutsche[.]online			
t-online[.]life	t-online[.]life		Spoofs T-Online.	
t-onlinl[.]life	t-onlinl[.]life	Defunct	Spoofs T-Online.	
t-onlinl[.]live	t-onlinl[.]live	Defunct	Spoofs T-Online.	
t-onlinl[.]today	t-onlinl[.]today	Defunct	Spoofs T-Online.	
t-onlinr[.]life	t-onlinr[.]life		Spoofs T-Online.	
t-onlinr[.]live	t-onlinr[.]live		Spoofs T-Online.	
t-onlinr[.]today	t-onlinr[.]today		Spoofs T-Online.	
tagesspiegel[.]co	tagesspiegel[.]co		Spoofs Der Tagesspiegel. Seized by the United States federal government in 2024.	
tagesspiegel[.]ltd	tagesspiegel[.]ltd		Spoofs Der Tagesspiegel.	
tonline[.]cfd	tonline[.]cfd		Spoofs T-Online.	
tonline[.]life	tonline[.]life		Spoofs T-Online.	
tonline[.]today	tonline[.]today		Spoofs T-Online.	
ua-pravda[.]click	ua-pravda[.]click		Spoofs Ukrainska Pravda.	
ukrlm.info	ukrlm.info			
unian[.]pm	unian[.]pm			
walla[.]com[.]co	walla[.]com[.]co		Spoofs Walla.	
washingtonpost[.]ltd	washingtonpost[.]ltd		Spoofs the Washington Post.	
warfareinsider.us	warfareinsider.us	Defunct	Seized by the United States federal government in 2024.	
welt[.]beauty	welt[.]beauty		Spoofs Welt.	
welt[.]lol	welt[.]lol		Spoofs Welt.	
welt[.]ltd	welt[.]ltd		Spoofs Welt.	
welt[.]media	welt[.]media		Spoofs Welt.	
welt[.]tours	welt[.]tours		Spoofs Welt.	
welt[.]ws	welt[.]ws		Spoofs Welt.	
weltt[.]beauty	weltt[.]beauty		Spoofs Welt.	
weltt[.]lol	weltt[.]lol		Spoofs Welt.	
zestiftung[.]com	zestiftung[.]com			

=== InfoRos ===
The following websites have been linked by researchers to the GRU.

Name	Domain	Status	Notes	Sources
12com[.]ru	12com[.]ru			
2memo[.]ru	2memo[.]ru			
4erkessk[.]ru	4erkessk[.]ru			
4memo[.]net	4memo[.]net			
5-gorsk[.]ru	5-gorsk[.]ru			
5lavr[.]org	5lavr[.]org			
abakan-pyatnitsa[.]ru	abakan-pyatnitsa[.]ru			
aban-pyatnitsa[.]ru	aban-pyatnitsa[.]ru			
abaz-vestnik[.]ru	abaz-vestnik[.]ru			
abinskaya-linia[.]ru	abinskaya-linia[.]ru			
achkhoi-martan[.]ru	achkhoi-martan[.]ru			
afip-den[.]ru	afip-den[.]ru			
aginskoe-today[.]ru	aginskoe-today[.]ru			
ahtirka[.]ru	ahtirka[.]ru			
ahtubinsk-projektor[.]ru	ahtubinsk-projektor[.]ru			
ahtyrka-info[.]ru	ahtyrka-info[.]ru			
aihal-vesti[.]ru	aihal-vesti[.]ru			
ak-dovurak[.]press	ak-dovurak[.]press			
aksaysovet[.]ru	aksaysovet[.]ru			
akua-suhum[.]info	akua-suhum[.]info			
alagirskie-dni[.]ru	alagirskie-dni[.]ru			
aldanvecher[.]ru	aldanvecher[.]ru			
aleksah[.]ru	aleksah[.]ru			
aleksandriyskaya[.]ru	aleksandriyskaya[.]ru			
aleksandrov-sloboda[.]ru	aleksandrov-sloboda[.]ru			
aleut-star[.]ru	aleut-star[.]ru			
alexsandrov-sloboda[.]ru	alexsandrov-sloboda[.]ru			
all-yalta[.]ru	all-yalta[.]ru			
alleroi[.]ru	alleroi[.]ru			
alleroy-utro[.]ru	alleroy-utro[.]ru			
altai-week[.]ru	altai-week[.]ru			
altaiskaya-iskra[.]ru	altaiskaya-iskra[.]ru			
alter-info[.]ru	alter-info[.]ru			
amak[.]ru	amak[.]ru			
amur-liman[.]ru	amur-liman[.]ru			
amur-novosti[.]ru	amur-novosti[.]ru			
amurzori[.]ru	amurzori[.]ru			
amzvezda[.]ru	amzvezda[.]ru			
anuzori[.]ru	anuzori[.]ru			
anyui[.]ru	anyui[.]ru			
anzhero-sudzhenski[.]ru	anzhero-sudzhenski[.]ru			
apatites[.]ru	apatites[.]ru			
apchas[.]ru	apchas[.]ru			
ar-asb[.]ru	ar-asb[.]ru			
aramil-vesti[.]ru	aramil-vesti[.]ru			
ardonvestnik[.]ru	ardonvestnik[.]ru			
argayash-m[.]ru	argayash-m[.]ru			
argumenty-kuragino[.]ru	argumenty-kuragino[.]ru			
argungazeta[.]ru	argungazeta[.]ru			
armavir-zerkalo[.]ru	armavir-zerkalo[.]ru			
armvestnik[.]ru	armvestnik[.]ru			
artem-plus[.]ru	artem-plus[.]ru			
arzamas-gazeta[.]ru	arzamas-gazeta[.]ru			
arzvest[.]ru	arzvest[.]ru			
askiz-press[.]ru	askiz-press[.]ru			
astapovskie[.]ru	astapovskie[.]ru			
atamanovskaya-pravda[.]ru	atamanovskaya-pravda[.]ru			
avangard-cv[.]ru	avangard-cv[.]ru			
avangard-d[.]ru	avangard-d[.]ru			
avangard-os[.]ru	avangard-os[.]ru			
avangard29[.]ru	avangard29[.]ru			
avangard57[.]ru	avangard57[.]ru			
avturvestnik[.]ru	avturvestnik[.]ru			
azovski-bereg[.]ru	azovski-bereg[.]ru			
b-gazeta[.]ru	b-gazeta[.]ru			
b-pravda[.]ru	b-pravda[.]ru			
b-volga[.]ru	b-volga[.]ru			
babaevogazeta[.]ru	babaevogazeta[.]ru			
bachi-yurt[.]ru	bachi-yurt[.]ru			
bahchisarai-gazeta[.]ru	bahchisarai-gazeta[.]ru			
bahchisaray-gazeta[.]ru	bahchisaray-gazeta[.]ru			
baikal-ogni[.]ru	baikal-ogni[.]ru			
baikalskie-ogni[.]ru	baikalskie-ogni[.]ru			
bakchar[.]ru	bakchar[.]ru			
baksanvesti[.]ru	baksanvesti[.]ru			
balabanovo-gazeta[.]ru	balabanovo-gazeta[.]ru			
balahna-vestnik[.]ru	balahna-vestnik[.]ru			
balaklavski-rybak[.]ru	balaklavski-rybak[.]ru			
balashiha-news[.]ru	balashiha-news[.]ru			
baltvedomosti[.]ru	baltvedomosti[.]ru			
barabinskie-zemlyaki[.]ru	barabinskie-zemlyaki[.]ru			
bashiskra[.]ru	bashiskra[.]ru			
bc-sco[.]org	bc-sco[.]org			
belkalitva[.]ru	belkalitva[.]ru			
belokruga[.]ru	belokruga[.]ru			
belomorskie-vesti[.]ru	belomorskie-vesti[.]ru			
belovskaya-niva[.]ru	belovskaya-niva[.]ru			
beloyarski-uspeh[.]ru	beloyarski-uspeh[.]ru			
belozero[.]ru	belozero[.]ru			
belpobeda[.]ru	belpobeda[.]ru			
belsmena[.]ru	belsmena[.]ru			
belvestnik[.]ru	belvestnik[.]ru			
belzarya[.]ru	belzarya[.]ru			
belznamya[.]ru	belznamya[.]ru			
belzori[.]ru	belzori[.]ru			
berbgo[.]ru	berbgo[.]ru			
bereg-holmsk[.]ru	bereg-holmsk[.]ru			
berezovski-kurs[.]ru	berezovski-kurs[.]ru			
beya-news[.]ru	beya-news[.]ru			
bezhetsk-time[.]ru	bezhetsk-time[.]ru			
big-karachai[.]ru	big-karachai[.]ru			
bigkamen[.]ru	bigkamen[.]ru			
bikin-volna[.]ru	bikin-volna[.]ru			
biychanka[.]press	biychanka[.]press			
biznovoch[.]ru	biznovoch[.]ru			
blagodarnensky[.]ru	blagodarnensky[.]ru			
bobur[.]ru	bobur[.]ru			
bogorodsky-variant[.]ru	bogorodsky-variant[.]ru			
boguchany-vestnik[.]ru	boguchany-vestnik[.]ru			
boguchar-vesti[.]ru	boguchar-vesti[.]ru			
bogved[.]ru	bogved[.]ru			
bold-vest[.]ru	bold-vest[.]ru			
bolhov-kur[.]ru	bolhov-kur[.]ru			
bolmurta[.]ru	bolmurta[.]ru			
bologoe-info[.]ru	bologoe-info[.]ru			
boltsaryn[.]ru	boltsaryn[.]ru			
bor-gorod[.]ru	bor-gorod[.]ru			
borisoglebskie-vesti[.]ru	borisoglebskie-vesti[.]ru			
borodino-panorama[.]ru	borodino-panorama[.]ru			
borovichanin[.]ru	borovichanin[.]ru			
br-perekrestok[.]ru	br-perekrestok[.]ru			
brasovkray[.]ru	brasovkray[.]ru			
bryuhovetskaya[.]ru	bryuhovetskaya[.]ru			
budennovsk-today[.]ru	budennovsk-today[.]ru			
budniyashkulya[.]ru	budniyashkulya[.]ru			
buinaksk-segodnya[.]ru	buinaksk-segodnya[.]ru			
bur-gaz[.]ru	bur-gaz[.]ru			
bvk-urzhum[.]ru	bvk-urzhum[.]ru			
cargologistic[.]ru	cargologistic[.]ru			
caspium[.]ru	caspium[.]ru			
chaikovski-vestnik[.]ru	chaikovski-vestnik[.]ru			
chainskoe-obozrenie[.]ru	chainskoe-obozrenie[.]ru			
chapliginski[.]ru	chapliginski[.]ru			
chastnoe-mnenie[.]ru	chastnoe-mnenie[.]ru			
chegdomin[.]ru	chegdomin[.]ru			
cherekvesti[.]ru	cherekvesti[.]ru			
cheremhovo-vedomosti[.]ru	cheremhovo-vedomosti[.]ru			
cheremhovskie-vedomosti[.]ru	cheremhovskie-vedomosti[.]ru			
chernogorsk-city[.]ru	chernogorsk-city[.]ru			
chernomor[.]press	chernomor[.]press			
chernoyarets[.]ru	chernoyarets[.]ru			
chudovski-kolokol[.]ru	chudovski-kolokol[.]ru			
chulman-vesti[.]ru	chulman-vesti[.]ru			
churapchy[.]ru	churapchy[.]ru			
chvestnik[.]ru	chvestnik[.]ru			
chyi[.]ru	chyi[.]ru			
dagkrim[.]ru	dagkrim[.]ru			
dal-pravda[.]ru	dal-pravda[.]ru			
dalmatovskaya-niva[.]ru	dalmatovskaya-niva[.]ru			
dalnerech[.]ru	dalnerech[.]ru			
dalnereche[.]ru	dalnereche[.]ru			
danilov-obozrenie[.]ru	danilov-obozrenie[.]ru			
dankov-panorama[.]ru	dankov-panorama[.]ru			
davydovskaya-poima[.]ru	davydovskaya-poima[.]ru			
dedovichi[.]ru	dedovichi[.]ru			
delklintsy[.]ru	delklintsy[.]ru			
delkolchugino[.]ru	delkolchugino[.]ru			
delkurganinsk[.]ru	delkurganinsk[.]ru			
delovaya-istra[.]ru	delovaya-istra[.]ru			
delovayanyurba[.]ru	delovayanyurba[.]ru			
delovoi-labinsk[.]ru	delovoi-labinsk[.]ru			
demyanskaya-okruga[.]ru	demyanskaya-okruga[.]ru			
denis-kravchenko[.]ru	denis-kravchenko[.]ru			
deniskravchenko[.]ru	deniskravchenko[.]ru			
derbent-vechorka[.]ru	derbent-vechorka[.]ru			
desnogorsk-news[.]ru	desnogorsk-news[.]ru			
dialog-kam[.]ru	dialog-kam[.]ru			
dialog-pikalevo[.]ru	dialog-pikalevo[.]ru			
dialogkarel[.]ru	dialogkarel[.]ru			
digora-vesti[.]ru	digora-vesti[.]ru			
digvesti[.]ru	digvesti[.]ru			
dinskaya-pravda[.]ru	dinskaya-pravda[.]ru			
dinskaya-zhizn[.]ru	dinskaya-zhizn[.]ru			
diplomatica[.]ru	diplomatica[.]ru			
dni-kulebaki[.]ru	dni-kulebaki[.]ru			
dnovets[.]ru	dnovets[.]ru			
dobri-den[.]ru	dobri-den[.]ru			
dobrii-den[.]ru	dobrii-den[.]ru			
dobtrud[.]ru	dobtrud[.]ru			
dolinsk-rybak[.]ru	dolinsk-rybak[.]ru			
domen-besplatno[.]ru	domen-besplatno[.]ru			
domovenok-press[.]ru	domovenok-press[.]ru			
don-ak[.]ru	don-ak[.]ru			
donetski-veteran[.]ru	donetski-veteran[.]ru			
donetsky-truzhenik[.]ru	donetsky-truzhenik[.]ru			
donogni[.]ru	donogni[.]ru			
dorogobuzh-gazeta[.]ru	dorogobuzh-gazeta[.]ru			
dost-jizn[.]ru	dost-jizn[.]ru			
dubna-gorodok[.]ru	dubna-gorodok[.]ru			
dukhovskie-novosti[.]ru	dukhovskie-novosti[.]ru			
duldurgin[.]ru	duldurgin[.]ru			
dyrtuli-express[.]ru	dyrtuli-express[.]ru			
dyur-express[.]ru	dyur-express[.]ru			
dzerzhinetspress[.]ru	dzerzhinetspress[.]ru			
egorevskoe-utro[.]ru	egorevskoe-utro[.]ru			
egorievskoe-utro[.]ru	egorievskoe-utro[.]ru			
ehokizlyara[.]ru	ehokizlyara[.]ru			
ehoosha[.]com	ehoosha[.]com			
ehoosha[.]ru	ehoosha[.]ru			
eiskiliman[.]ru	eiskiliman[.]ru			
elbrusnews[.]ru	elbrusnews[.]ru			
elkhotovo[.]ru	elkhotovo[.]ru			
elkhov-prostory[.]ru	elkhov-prostory[.]ru			
emelyanovo-besedy[.]ru	emelyanovo-besedy[.]ru			
eniseiskaya-gubernia[.]ru	eniseiskaya-gubernia[.]ru			
enotaevka-listok[.]ru	enotaevka-listok[.]ru			
enotaevski-listok[.]ru	enotaevski-listok[.]ru			
ermakovskoe-utro[.]ru	ermakovskoe-utro[.]ru			
essentukskaya[.]ru	essentukskaya[.]ru			
esso-news[.]ru	esso-news[.]ru			
esticrimea[.]ru	esticrimea[.]ru			
evenchanka[.]ru	evenchanka[.]ru			
evpatoria-objectiv[.]ru	evpatoria-objectiv[.]ru			
evpatoriski[.]ru	evpatoriski[.]ru			
faces-magazine[.]ru	faces-magazine[.]ru			
faces-vol[.]ru	faces-vol[.]ru			
fatezhsky-golos[.]ru	fatezhsky-golos[.]ru			
federalpress[.]ru	federalpress[.]ru			
feodosia-prov[.]ru	feodosia-prov[.]ru			
fonar-yugra[.]ru	fonar-yugra[.]ru			
forumkrim[.]ru	forumkrim[.]ru			
freemediaforum[.]info	freemediaforum[.]info			
fryazinets[.]ru	fryazinets[.]ru			
furmanovski-vestnik[.]ru	furmanovski-vestnik[.]ru			
gadzhievo-news[.]ru	gadzhievo-news[.]ru			
gagvesti[.]ru	gagvesti[.]ru			
gatchina-dom[.]press	gatchina-dom[.]press			
gatchina-press[.]ru	gatchina-press[.]ru			
gavrilovyam[.]ru	gavrilovyam[.]ru			
gazeta-belozerie[.]ru	gazeta-belozerie[.]ru			
gazeta-dnovets[.]ru	gazeta-dnovets[.]ru			
gazeta-konakovo[.]ru	gazeta-konakovo[.]ru			
gazeta-organizator[.]ru	gazeta-organizator[.]ru			
gazeta-osered[.]ru	gazeta-osered[.]ru			
gazeta-oshmes[.]ru	gazeta-oshmes[.]ru			
gazeta-pokrovskoe[.]ru	gazeta-pokrovskoe[.]ru			
gazeta-polyus[.]ru	gazeta-polyus[.]ru			
gazeta-safonovo[.]ru	gazeta-safonovo[.]ru			
gazeta-shelehov[.]ru	gazeta-shelehov[.]ru			
gazeta-sm[.]ru	gazeta-sm[.]ru			
gazeta-st[.]ru	gazeta-st[.]ru			
gazeta-star[.]ru	gazeta-star[.]ru			
gazeta-suoyarvi[.]ru	gazeta-suoyarvi[.]ru			
gazeta-tuapse[.]ru	gazeta-tuapse[.]ru			
gazeta-volna[.]ru	gazeta-volna[.]ru			
gazeta-zp[.]ru	gazeta-zp[.]ru			
gazetababaevo[.]ru	gazetababaevo[.]ru			
gazetakurg[.]ru	gazetakurg[.]ru			
gazetaak[.]ru	gazetaak[.]ru			
gazetasovetsk[.]ru	gazetasovetsk[.]ru			
gazetatavrika[.]ru	gazetatavrika[.]ru			
gazetavek[.]ru	gazetavek[.]ru			
gazetavest[.]info	gazetavest[.]info			
gazetazt[.]ru	gazetazt[.]ru			
gdov-zarya[.]ru	gdov-zarya[.]ru			
gekhi[.]ru	gekhi[.]ru			
geldagana[.]ru	geldagana[.]ru			
gelendzhik-week[.]ru	gelendzhik-week[.]ru			
georgievsk-krepost[.]ru	georgievsk-krepost[.]ru			
germanscrimea[.]ru	germanscrimea[.]ru			
geroldia[.]ru	geroldia[.]ru			
giaginskoe-vremya[.]ru	giaginskoe-vremya[.]ru			
gipanis[.]ru	gipanis[.]ru			
gizbudni[.]ru	gizbudni[.]ru			
gizelbudni[.]ru	gizelbudni[.]ru			
glas-cherepanovo[.]ru	glas-cherepanovo[.]ru			
glushkovo-vesti[.]ru	glushkovo-vesti[.]ru			
goity-vestnik[.]ru	goity-vestnik[.]ru			
golden-berdsk[.]ru	golden-berdsk[.]ru			
golos-chegem[.]ru	golos-chegem[.]ru			
golos-dobrinki[.]ru	golos-dobrinki[.]ru			
golos-kh[.]ru	golos-kh[.]ru			
golos-ordynskogo[.]ru	golos-ordynskogo[.]ru			
golos-p[.]ru	golos-p[.]ru			
golos-pestova[.]ru	golos-pestova[.]ru			
golos-pr[.]ru	golos-pr[.]ru			
golos-prom[.]ru	golos-prom[.]ru			
golos-shumihi[.]ru	golos-shumihi[.]ru			
golos-t[.]ru	golos-t[.]ru			
golosadyg[.]ru	golosadyg[.]ru			
golosamura[.]ru	golosamura[.]ru			
golosladogy[.]ru	golosladogy[.]ru			
golosmozdoka[.]ru	golosmozdoka[.]ru			
golyshman[.]ru	golyshman[.]ru			
goraltay[.]ru	goraltay[.]ru			
gorcomvest[.]ru	gorcomvest[.]ru			
gornaya-pravda[.]ru	gornaya-pravda[.]ru			
gorod-frolovo[.]ru	gorod-frolovo[.]ru			
gorod-kostomuksha[.]ru	gorod-kostomuksha[.]ru			
gorod-kurchatov[.]ru	gorod-kurchatov[.]ru			
gorod-lukhovitsy[.]ru	gorod-lukhovitsy[.]ru			
gorod-oboyan[.]ru	gorod-oboyan[.]ru			
gorod-ostrov[.]ru	gorod-ostrov[.]ru			
gorod-sovetsky[.]ru	gorod-sovetsky[.]ru			
gorod-uchaly[.]ru	gorod-uchaly[.]ru			
gorod-usman[.]ru	gorod-usman[.]ru			
gorodbeloretsk[.]ru	gorodbeloretsk[.]ru			
gorodostrov[.]info	gorodostrov[.]info			
gorodsibai[.]ru	gorodsibai[.]ru			
gorokhovets-vesti[.]ru	gorokhovets-vesti[.]ru			
gorozhane-gazeta[.]ru	gorozhane-gazeta[.]ru			
gorpravda[.]ru	gorpravda[.]ru			
gorshechnoe-vremya[.]ru	gorshechnoe-vremya[.]ru			
goryachi-klyuch[.]ru	goryachi-klyuch[.]ru			
govorit-bobrov[.]ru	govorit-bobrov[.]ru			
govorit-krivosheino[.]ru	govorit-krivosheino[.]ru			
govorit-luga[.]ru	govorit-luga[.]ru			
govorit-sichovka[.]ru	govorit-sichovka[.]ru			
govorit-sychevka[.]ru	govorit-sychevka[.]ru			
govorit-zhukovka[.]ru	govorit-zhukovka[.]ru			
govoritluga[.]ru	govoritluga[.]ru			
grach26[.]ru	grach26[.]ru			
gradjeleznogorsk[.]ru	gradjeleznogorsk[.]ru			
gradzheleznogorsk[.]ru	gradzheleznogorsk[.]ru			
gryazinski-vestnik[.]ru	gryazinski-vestnik[.]ru			
gudermes-izvestia[.]ru	gudermes-izvestia[.]ru			
gulkevichi-press[.]ru	gulkevichi-press[.]ru			
gulkevichi-week[.]ru	gulkevichi-week[.]ru			
gurievsk-variant[.]ru	gurievsk-variant[.]ru			
gurievski-vestnik[.]ru	gurievski-vestnik[.]ru			
gusnovosti[.]ru	gusnovosti[.]ru			
h-priziv[.]ru	h-priziv[.]ru			
hangalasski-ulus[.]ru	hangalasski-ulus[.]ru			
harovskpriziv[.]ru	harovskpriziv[.]ru			
hasanvesti[.]ru	hasanvesti[.]ru			
hasavyurt-vestnik[.]ru	hasavyurt-vestnik[.]ru			
himki-gazeta[.]ru	himki-gazeta[.]ru			
hipanis[.]ru	hipanis[.]ru			
hlevenskaya-okruga[.]ru	hlevenskaya-okruga[.]ru			
hvoinaya-raion[.]ru	hvoinaya-raion[.]ru			
ilanskoe-znamya[.]ru	ilanskoe-znamya[.]ru			
ilmen-berega[.]ru	ilmen-berega[.]ru			
ilsky-golos[.]ru	ilsky-golos[.]ru			
ilsky-gorozhanin[.]ru	ilsky-gorozhanin[.]ru			
indsever[.]ru	indsever[.]ru			
info-kras[.]ru	info-kras[.]ru			
infoabakan[.]ru	infoabakan[.]ru			
infoabhaziya[.]ru	infoabhaziya[.]ru			
infoadyg[.]ru	infoadyg[.]ru			
infoadygea[.]ru	infoadygea[.]ru			
infoafip[.]ru	infoafip[.]ru			
infoagidel[.]ru	infoagidel[.]ru			
infoak-dovurak[.]ru	infoak-dovurak[.]ru			
infoalan[.]ru	infoalan[.]ru			
infoalania[.]ru	infoalania[.]ru			
infoaldan[.]ru	infoaldan[.]ru			
infoaleisk[.]ru	infoaleisk[.]ru			
infoalta[.]ru	infoalta[.]ru			
infoamur[.]ru	infoamur[.]ru			
infoarsenev[.]ru	infoarsenev[.]ru			
infoarseniev[.]ru	infoarseniev[.]ru			
infoastra[.]ru	infoastra[.]ru			
infoavtury[.]ru	infoavtury[.]ru			
infobabushkin[.]ru	infobabushkin[.]ru			
infobaltica[.]ru	infobaltica[.]ru			
infobash[.]ru	infobash[.]ru			
infobaykal[.]ru	infobaykal[.]ru			
infobelg[.]ru	infobelg[.]ru			
infoberezovka[.]ru	infoberezovka[.]ru			
infobeslan[.]ru	infobeslan[.]ru			
infobira[.]ru	infobira[.]ru			
infoblag[.]ru	infoblag[.]ru			
InfoBrics	infobrics[.]org			
InfoBrics	infobrics[.]ru			
infoburatia[.]ru	infoburatia[.]ru			
infoburyatia[.]ru	infoburyatia[.]ru			
infochadan[.]ru	infochadan[.]ru			
infochelyabinsk[.]ru	infochelyabinsk[.]ru			
infochermen[.]ru	infochermen[.]ru			
infochukotka[.]ru	infochukotka[.]ru			
infochuv[.]ru	infochuv[.]ru			
infochuvashia[.]ru	infochuvashia[.]ru			
infocursk[.]ru	infocursk[.]ru			
infodag[.]ru	infodag[.]ru			
infodesna[.]info	infodesna[.]info			
infodivnoe[.]ru	infodivnoe[.]ru			
infodivnogorsk[.]ru	infodivnogorsk[.]ru			
infodnepr[.]ru	infodnepr[.]ru			
infodobryanka[.]ru	infodobryanka[.]ru			
infodonskoe[.]ru	infodonskoe[.]ru			
infodubrovka[.]ru	infodubrovka[.]ru			
infoduldurga[.]ru	infoduldurga[.]ru			
infodvina[.]ru	infodvina[.]ru			
infodyatkovo[.]ru	infodyatkovo[.]ru			
infoelbrus[.]ru	infoelbrus[.]ru			
infoelburgan[.]ru	infoelburgan[.]ru			
infoelizavetinskaya[.]ru	infoelizavetinskaya[.]ru			
infoelizovo[.]ru	infoelizovo[.]ru			
infoenisey[.]ru	infoenisey[.]ru			
infoglazunovka[.]ru	infoglazunovka[.]ru			
infogornyak[.]ru	infogornyak[.]ru			
infogorodovikovsk[.]ru	infogorodovikovsk[.]ru			
infogukovo[.]ru	infogukovo[.]ru			
infogulkevichi[.]ru	infogulkevichi[.]ru			
infohab[.]ru	infohab[.]ru			
infohabarovsk[.]ru	infohabarovsk[.]ru			
infoingush[.]ru	infoingush[.]ru			
infoingushetia[.]ru	infoingushetia[.]ru			
infoipatovo[.]ru	infoipatovo[.]ru			
infoirkut[.]ru	infoirkut[.]ru			
infoiset[.]ru	infoiset[.]ru			
infoistochnik[.]ru	infoistochnik[.]ru			
infoivanovo[.]ru	infoivanovo[.]ru			
infokalgan[.]ru	infokalgan[.]ru			
infokalm[.]ru	infokalm[.]ru			
infokalmykia[.]ru	infokalmykia[.]ru			
infokaltan[.]ru	infokaltan[.]ru			
infokaluga[.]ru	infokaluga[.]ru			
infokama[.]ru	infokama[.]ru			
infokamchatka[.]ru	infokamchatka[.]ru			
infokamyshin[.]ru	infokamyshin[.]ru			
infokamysin[.]ru	infokamysin[.]ru			
infokaraga[.]ru	infokaraga[.]ru			
infokarel[.]ru	infokarel[.]ru			
infokarelia[.]ru	infokarelia[.]ru			
infokargasok[.]ru	infokargasok[.]ru			
infokatun[.]ru	infokatun[.]ru			
infokb[.]ru	infokb[.]ru			
infokemer[.]ru	infokemer[.]ru			
infokemerovo[.]ru	infokemerovo[.]ru			
infokg[.]ru	infokg[.]ru			
infokirovsk[.]ru	infokirovsk[.]ru			
infokirzhach[.]ru	infokirzhach[.]ru			
infokola[.]ru	infokola[.]ru			
infokologriv[.]ru	infokologriv[.]ru			
infokomi[.]ru	infokomi[.]ru			
infokommunar[.]ru	infokommunar[.]ru			
infokostroma[.]info	infokostroma[.]info			
infokrasn[.]ru	infokrasn[.]ru			
infokrasnodar[.]ru	infokrasnodar[.]ru			
infokrim[.]info	infokrim[.]info			
infokurg[.]ru	infokurg[.]ru			
infokurgan[.]ru	infokurgan[.]ru			
infokursavka[.]ru	infokursavka[.]ru			
infokursk[.]info	infokursk[.]info			
infokursk[.]pro	infokursk[.]pro			
infokurskaya[.]ru	infokurskaya[.]ru			
infokushchevskaya[.]ru	infokushchevskaya[.]ru			
infolena[.]ru	infolena[.]ru			
infolipechk[.]ru	infolipechk[.]ru			
infolipetsk[.]com	infolipetsk[.]com			
infoliski[.]ru	infoliski[.]ru			
infomagad[.]ru	infomagad[.]ru			
infomagadan[.]ru	infomagadan[.]ru			
infomaima[.]ru	infomaima[.]ru			
infomari[.]ru	infomari[.]ru			
infomelenki[.]ru	infomelenki[.]ru			
infomikhailovka[.]ru	infomikhailovka[.]ru			
infominusinsk[.]ru	infominusinsk[.]ru			
infomordovia[.]ru	infomordovia[.]ru			
infomosk[.]ru	infomosk[.]ru			
infomoskovia[.]ru	infomoskovia[.]ru			
infomurmansk[.]ru	infomurmansk[.]ru			
infoneftekumsk[.]ru	infoneftekumsk[.]ru			
infonen[.]ru	infonen[.]ru			
infonerl[.]ru	infonerl[.]ru			
infoneva[.]ru	infoneva[.]ru			
infonikolskoe[.]ru	infonikolskoe[.]ru			
infonnov[.]ru	infonnov[.]ru			
infonovgorod[.]ru	infonovgorod[.]ru			
infonovokubansk[.]ru	infonovokubansk[.]ru			
infonovosib[.]ru	infonovosib[.]ru			
infonovosibirsk[.]ru	infonovosibirsk[.]ru			
infonovousman[.]ru	infonovousman[.]ru			
infonovousmansk[.]ru	infonovousmansk[.]ru			
infonsib[.]ru	infonsib[.]ru			
infooka[.]ru	infooka[.]ru			
infoolekma[.]ru	infoolekma[.]ru			
infoom[.]ru	infoom[.]ru			
infoorenburg[.]ru	infoorenburg[.]ru			
infoossora[.]ru	infoossora[.]ru			
infoparma[.]ru	infoparma[.]ru			
infopartizansk[.]ru	infopartizansk[.]ru			
infopechora[.]ru	infopechora[.]ru			
infopoltavskaya[.]ru	infopoltavskaya[.]ru			
infopraskoveya[.]ru	infopraskoveya[.]ru			
infopriazove[.]ru	infopriazove[.]ru			
infopriozersk[.]ru	infopriozersk[.]ru			
infopskov[.]ru	infopskov[.]ru			
infopskova[.]ru	infopskova[.]ru			
infopur[.]ru	infopur[.]ru			
infopushkino[.]ru	infopushkino[.]ru			
inforaychihinsk[.]ru	inforaychihinsk[.]ru			
inform-kurier[.]ru	inform-kurier[.]ru			
InfoRos	inforos[.]org			
InfoRos	inforos[.]ru			
inforost[.]ru	inforost[.]ru			
inforyaz[.]ru	inforyaz[.]ru			
inforyazan[.]com	inforyazan[.]com			
infosahalin[.]ru	infosahalin[.]ru			
infosam[.]ru	infosam[.]ru			
infosamara[.]press	infosamara[.]press			
infosarat[.]ru	infosarat[.]ru			
infosco[.]biz	infosco[.]biz			
infosco[.]org	infosco[.]org			
infosevastopol[.]ru	infosevastopol[.]ru			
infoseveromorsk[.]ru	infoseveromorsk[.]ru			
infoshagonar[.]ru	infoshagonar[.]ru			
infosharya[.]ru	infosharya[.]ru			
infosibai[.]ru	infosibai[.]ru			
infosibir[.]ru	infosibir[.]ru			
infosimbirsk[.]ru	infosimbirsk[.]ru			
infosobolevo[.]ru	infosobolevo[.]ru			
infosokol[.]ru	infosokol[.]ru			
infosolnechnyi[.]ru	infosolnechnyi[.]ru			
infostavr[.]ru	infostavr[.]ru			
infosura[.]ru	infosura[.]ru			
infosvetogorsk[.]ru	infosvetogorsk[.]ru			
infotam[.]ru	infotam[.]ru			
infotambov[.]ru	infotambov[.]ru			
infotatarstan[.]ru	infotatarstan[.]ru			
infotbilisskaya[.]ru	infotbilisskaya[.]ru			
infotemryuk[.]ru	infotemryuk[.]ru			
infoterek[.]info	infoterek[.]info			
infoterek[.]ru	infoterek[.]ru			
infotigil[.]ru	infotigil[.]ru			
infotilichiki[.]ru	infotilichiki[.]ru			
infotom[.]ru	infotom[.]ru			
infotosno[.]ru	infotosno[.]ru			
infotsiolkovskiy[.]ru	infotsiolkovskiy[.]ru			
infotul[.]ru	infotul[.]ru			
infotula[.]com	infotula[.]com			
infotumen[.]ru	infotumen[.]ru			
infoturan[.]ru	infoturan[.]ru			
infotuva[.]ru	infotuva[.]ru			
infotver[.]ru	infotver[.]ru			
infotvers[.]ru	infotvers[.]ru			
infotynda[.]ru	infotynda[.]ru			
infoudachniy[.]ru	infoudachniy[.]ru			
infoudm[.]ru	infoudm[.]ru			
infoudmurtia[.]ru	infoudmurtia[.]ru			
infoulyanovsk[.]ru	infoulyanovsk[.]ru			
infouraltau[.]ru	infouraltau[.]ru			
infovladimiria[.]ru	infovladimiria[.]ru			
infovolg[.]ru	infovolg[.]ru			
infovolga[.]com	infovolga[.]com			
infovolhov[.]ru	infovolhov[.]ru			
infovolog[.]ru	infovolog[.]ru			
infovologda[.]ru	infovologda[.]ru			
infovoroneg[.]ru	infovoroneg[.]ru			
infovoronezh[.]com	infovoronezh[.]com			
infovostok[.]ru	infovostok[.]ru			
infovulkan[.]ru	infovulkan[.]ru			
infovyatka[.]ru	infovyatka[.]ru			
infovyksa[.]ru	infovyksa[.]ru			
infoya[.]ru	infoya[.]ru			
infoyakutia[.]ru	infoyakutia[.]ru			
infoyamal[.]ru	infoyamal[.]ru			
infoyanaul[.]ru	infoyanaul[.]ru			
infoygra[.]ru	infoygra[.]ru			
infoyug[.]ru	infoyug[.]ru			
infoyugra[.]ru	infoyugra[.]ru			
infozelenokumsk[.]ru	infozelenokumsk[.]ru			
infozeya[.]ru	infozeya[.]ru			
infozverevo[.]ru	infozverevo[.]ru			
ingush-meridian[.]ru	ingush-meridian[.]ru			
initsiativakrim[.]ru	initsiativakrim[.]ru			
irafi[.]ru	irafi[.]ru			
irbeiskoe-vremya[.]ru	irbeiskoe-vremya[.]ru			
isetskaya-pravda[.]ru	isetskaya-pravda[.]ru			
isetski-efir[.]ru	isetski-efir[.]ru			
iskra-et[.]ru	iskra-et[.]ru			
iskra-j[.]ru	iskra-j[.]ru			
iskra-vihorevki[.]ru	iskra-vihorevki[.]ru			
istoki-p[.]ru	istoki-p[.]ru			
iv-gazeta[.]ru	iv-gazeta[.]ru			
ivanovskie-rassvety[.]ru	ivanovskie-rassvety[.]ru			
ivanovskie-rodniki[.]ru	ivanovskie-rodniki[.]ru			
izvor-bg[.]ru	izvor-bg[.]ru			
jatay[.]ru	jatay[.]ru			
jenbur[.]ru	jenbur[.]ru			
k-sorm[.]ru	k-sorm[.]ru			
ka-izvestia[.]ru	ka-izvestia[.]ru			
kaa-khem[.]press	kaa-khem[.]press			
kabansk-d[.]ru	kabansk-d[.]ru			
kalach-inform[.]ru	kalach-inform[.]ru			
kalach-izvestia[.]ru	kalach-izvestia[.]ru			
kaleidoskop-pavlovo[.]ru	kaleidoskop-pavlovo[.]ru			
kalevalskaya-gornitsa[.]ru	kalevalskaya-gornitsa[.]ru			
kamenskie-sobytia[.]ru	kamenskie-sobytia[.]ru			
kamyshlin[.]ru	kamyshlin[.]ru			
kamyzyak-rodnik[.]ru	kamyzyak-rodnik[.]ru			
kan-kanev[.]ru	kan-kanev[.]ru			
kanevskaya-nedelya[.]ru	kanevskaya-nedelya[.]ru			
karabashrab[.]ru	karabashrab[.]ru			
karabulak-sovet[.]ru	karabulak-sovet[.]ru			
karaga-raion[.]ru	karaga-raion[.]ru			
karagasok[.]ru	karagasok[.]ru			
karavest[.]ru	karavest[.]ru			
karel-news[.]ru	karel-news[.]ru			
kargasok-gazeta[.]ru	kargasok-gazeta[.]ru			
karpinrab[.]ru	karpinrab[.]ru			
kasimov-panorama[.]ru	kasimov-panorama[.]ru			
kasimovskaya-panorama[.]ru	kasimovskaya-panorama[.]ru			
kaspinews[.]ru	kaspinews[.]ru			
kaspiyskie-stranitsi[.]ru	kaspiyskie-stranitsi[.]ru			
kaspnews[.]ru	kaspnews[.]ru			
kataiski-gorozhanin[.]ru	kataiski-gorozhanin[.]ru			
katar-yurt[.]ru	katar-yurt[.]ru			
kavkaz-meridian[.]ru	kavkaz-meridian[.]ru			
kazachia-buhta[.]ru	kazachia-buhta[.]ru			
kazanskoe-dzd[.]ru	kazanskoe-dzd[.]ru			
kerch-rb[.]ru	kerch-rb[.]ru			
khadyzhensk-pravda[.]ru	khadyzhensk-pravda[.]ru			
khasynsky[.]ru	khasynsky[.]ru			
khtvesti[.]ru	khtvesti[.]ru			
kimry-region[.]ru	kimry-region[.]ru			
kineshma-pravda[.]ru	kineshma-pravda[.]ru			
kingisepp-day[.]ru	kingisepp-day[.]ru			
kirovest[.]ru	kirovest[.]ru			
kirovsk-gazeta[.]ru	kirovsk-gazeta[.]ru			
kislovodskaya-pravda[.]ru	kislovodskaya-pravda[.]ru			
kitay-gorod[.]ru	kitay-gorod[.]ru			
kizlyar-izvestia[.]ru	kizlyar-izvestia[.]ru			
kizlyar-vesti[.]ru	kizlyar-vesti[.]ru			
kizlyarskie-izvestia[.]ru	kizlyarskie-izvestia[.]ru			
klimvestnik[.]ru	klimvestnik[.]ru			
klin-novosti[.]ru	klin-novosti[.]ru			
kochenevo-gazeta[.]ru	kochenevo-gazeta[.]ru			
kodinskie-vesty[.]ru	kodinskie-vesty[.]ru			
kogalym-rb[.]ru	kogalym-rb[.]ru			
kola-bay[.]ru	kola-bay[.]ru			
kolomnal[.]ru	kolomnal[.]ru			
kolym-pravda[.]ru	kolym-pravda[.]ru			
komarichi-kray[.]ru	komarichi-kray[.]ru			
kompas-gubkina[.]ru	kompas-gubkina[.]ru			
kompass-bui[.]ru	kompass-bui[.]ru			
komsomol-news[.]ru	komsomol-news[.]ru			
komvolna[.]ru	komvolna[.]ru			
kondopoj[.]ru	kondopoj[.]ru			
kondrovskie-budni[.]ru	kondrovskie-budni[.]ru			
konstantinovsk-today[.]ru	konstantinovsk-today[.]ru			
kontakt-sayansk[.]ru	kontakt-sayansk[.]ru			
korabel-sv[.]ru	korabel-sv[.]ru			
korablino-gazeta[.]ru	korablino-gazeta[.]ru			
korenovskaya-nov[.]ru	korenovskaya-nov[.]ru			
korolyov-news[.]ru	korolyov-news[.]ru			
kosh-agach[.]com	kosh-agach[.]com			
koshekhabl[.]ru	koshekhabl[.]ru			
kotovestnik[.]ru	kotovestnik[.]ru			
kovrovgazeta[.]ru	kovrovgazeta[.]ru			
kozelsky-telegraf[.]ru	kozelsky-telegraf[.]ru			
kozhkrai[.]ru	kozhkrai[.]ru			
kozulsk-gazeta[.]ru	kozulsk-gazeta[.]ru			
kras-okt[.]ru	kras-okt[.]ru			
krasnoe-znamya[.]info	krasnoe-znamya[.]info			
krasnoozerskoe[.]ru	krasnoozerskoe[.]ru			
krasnoper[.]ru	krasnoper[.]ru			
krasnoznamensk-plus[.]ru	krasnoznamensk-plus[.]ru			
krasnoznamya[.]ru	krasnoznamya[.]ru			
kremenki-inform[.]ru	kremenki-inform[.]ru			
krestetski-raion[.]ru	krestetski-raion[.]ru			
krim-gazeta[.]ru	krim-gazeta[.]ru			
krimkuray[.]ru	krimkuray[.]ru			
kromskie-rodniki[.]ru	kromskie-rodniki[.]ru			
krovstroy[.]ru	krovstroy[.]ru			
krymsk-krasnodar[.]ru	krymsk-krasnodar[.]ru			
kshensky-vestnik[.]ru	kshensky-vestnik[.]ru			
kstovo-budni[.]ru	kstovo-budni[.]ru			
kstovskie-budni[.]ru	kstovskie-budni[.]ru			
ktmu[.]ru	ktmu[.]ru			
ku-metallurg[.]ru	ku-metallurg[.]ru			
kubanskie-volny[.]ru	kubanskie-volny[.]ru			
kudymkar-vedomosti[.]ru	kudymkar-vedomosti[.]ru			
kulebaki[.]press	kulebaki[.]press			
kungurgazeta[.]ru	kungurgazeta[.]ru			
kupino-gazeta[.]ru	kupino-gazeta[.]ru			
kurchaloi[.]ru	kurchaloi[.]ru			
kurtamish[.]ru	kurtamish[.]ru			
kyahta-gazeta[.]ru	kyahta-gazeta[.]ru			
l-baikal[.]ru	l-baikal[.]ru			
labinskie-berega[.]ru	labinskie-berega[.]ru			
ladoga-krai[.]ru	ladoga-krai[.]ru			
ladozhski-krai[.]ru	ladozhski-krai[.]ru			
lebedyanskaya[.]ru	lebedyanskaya[.]ru			
lensklife[.]ru	lensklife[.]ru			
lensky-nasleg[.]ru	lensky-nasleg[.]ru			
lesken-gazeta[.]ru	lesken-gazeta[.]ru			
lesosibirsk-vesti[.]ru	lesosibirsk-vesti[.]ru			
lesozavodsk-time[.]ru	lesozavodsk-time[.]ru			
lestnicagzt[.]ru	lestnicagzt[.]ru			
levokumsk[.]ru	levokumsk[.]ru			
levozerovo[.]ru	levozerovo[.]ru			
lgovsky-vestnik[.]ru	lgovsky-vestnik[.]ru			
life-kch[.]ru	life-kch[.]ru			
limanvestnik[.]ru	limanvestnik[.]ru			
liski-gorod[.]ru	liski-gorod[.]ru			
listok-ga[.]ru	listok-ga[.]ru			
livny-na-ladoni[.]ru	livny-na-ladoni[.]ru			
lk-anons[.]ru	lk-anons[.]ru			
lobnya-pravda[.]ru	lobnya-pravda[.]ru			
louhi24[.]ru	louhi24[.]ru			
lovozero-vzglyad[.]ru	lovozero-vzglyad[.]ru			
ludprol[.]ru	ludprol[.]ru			
lyubitino-news[.]ru	lyubitino-news[.]ru			
lyudinka[.]ru	lyudinka[.]ru			
lyudinovski-proletari[.]ru	lyudinovski-proletari[.]ru			
m-gazeta[.]info	m-gazeta[.]info			
m-ingushetiya[.]ru	m-ingushetiya[.]ru			
magdagachi-press[.]ru	magdagachi-press[.]ru			
magnievik[.]ru	magnievik[.]ru			
mairtup-zemledelets[.]ru	mairtup-zemledelets[.]ru			
mairtup[.]info	mairtup[.]info			
malaya-purga[.]ru	malaya-purga[.]ru			
malderbety[.]ru	malderbety[.]ru			
malovisherskaya-pravda[.]ru	malovisherskaya-pravda[.]ru			
maloyar-izvestiya[.]ru	maloyar-izvestiya[.]ru			
maloyaroslavets-izvestia[.]ru	maloyaroslavets-izvestia[.]ru			
mamonovskie-vesti[.]ru	mamonovskie-vesti[.]ru			
manych-press[.]ru	manych-press[.]ru			
mariinsk-gorod[.]ru	mariinsk-gorod[.]ru			
maximum-kor[.]ru	maximum-kor[.]ru			
ak-kr[.]ru	ak-kr[.]ru			
ak-sp[.]ru	ak-sp[.]ru			
ak-spassk[.]ru	ak-spassk[.]ru			
ak57[.]ru	ak57[.]ru			
akarc[.]ru	akarc[.]ru			
news[.]ru	news[.]ru			
mcensky[.]ru	mcensky[.]ru			
mdgazet[.]ru	mdgazet[.]ru			
medvenka[.]ru	medvenka[.]ru			
mejdure4e[.]ru	mejdure4e[.]ru			
meleuzka[.]info	meleuzka[.]info			
mercurius11[.]ru	mercurius11[.]ru			
mestnaya-vlast[.]ru	mestnaya-vlast[.]ru			
mezhveter[.]ru	mezhveter[.]ru			
mglinsky-golos[.]ru	mglinsky-golos[.]ru			
mih-vestnik[.]ru	mih-vestnik[.]ru			
mihailov-glavnoe[.]ru	mihailov-glavnoe[.]ru			
mikhailovskoe-vremya[.]ru	mikhailovskoe-vremya[.]ru			
mikhajlovskoe[.]ru	mikhajlovskoe[.]ru			
milkovo-vesti[.]ru	milkovo-vesti[.]ru			
milkovskie-vesti[.]ru	milkovskie-vesti[.]ru			
minusinsk-today[.]ru	minusinsk-today[.]ru			
minvody-time[.]ru	minvody-time[.]ru			
mir-baikala[.]ru	mir-baikala[.]ru			
mirnoe-slovo[.]ru	mirnoe-slovo[.]ru			
moi-belorechensk[.]ru	moi-belorechensk[.]ru			
moi-monchegorsk[.]ru	moi-monchegorsk[.]ru			
moi-polyarny[.]ru	moi-polyarny[.]ru			
molingushetia[.]ru	molingushetia[.]ru			
molodbur[.]ru	molodbur[.]ru			
molodost-mozhgi[.]ru	molodost-mozhgi[.]ru			
molodostsibiri[.]ru	molodostsibiri[.]ru			
morozovskii[.]ru	morozovskii[.]ru			
mosalskgazeta[.]ru	mosalskgazeta[.]ru			
moshkovo-horizon[.]ru	moshkovo-horizon[.]ru			
moskva-reka[.]info	moskva-reka[.]info			
moskvapetushki[.]ru	moskvapetushki[.]ru			
moy-bataisk[.]ru	moy-bataisk[.]ru			
moya-shatura[.]ru	moya-shatura[.]ru			
muezerskles[.]ru	muezerskles[.]ru			
muhoshibir[.]ru	muhoshibir[.]ru			
muravlenko-sn[.]ru	muravlenko-sn[.]ru			
murmash[.]ru	murmash[.]ru			
muromregion[.]ru	muromregion[.]ru			
my-nahodka[.]ru	my-nahodka[.]ru			
n-ingash[.]ru	n-ingash[.]ru			
n-sever[.]ru	n-sever[.]ru			
n-vestnik[.]ru	n-vestnik[.]ru			
n-vologda[.]ru	n-vologda[.]ru			
n-vremya[.]ru	n-vremya[.]ru			
n-vse[.]ru	n-vse[.]ru			
na-vodakh[.]ru	na-vodakh[.]ru			
nadezhda-vichuzhan[.]ru	nadezhda-vichuzhan[.]ru			
nar-gazeta[.]ru	nar-gazeta[.]ru			
narkom-ru[.]ru	narkom-ru[.]ru			
naryshkino-news[.]ru	naryshkino-news[.]ru			
nash-kolos[.]ru	nash-kolos[.]ru			
nash-kurchatov[.]ru	nash-kurchatov[.]ru			
nash-nevelsk[.]ru	nash-nevelsk[.]ru			
nash-polevskoy[.]ru	nash-polevskoy[.]ru			
nash-ryazhsk[.]ru	nash-ryazhsk[.]ru			
nash-susuman[.]ru	nash-susuman[.]ru			
nasha-alushta[.]ru	nasha-alushta[.]ru			
nasha-gazeta[.]ru	nasha-gazeta[.]ru			
nashanadejda[.]ru	nashanadejda[.]ru			
nashanavlya[.]ru	nashanavlya[.]ru			
nashazhizn-gvardeisk[.]ru	nashazhizn-gvardeisk[.]ru			
nashe-verhovie[.]ru	nashe-verhovie[.]ru			
nashesadovoe[.]ru	nashesadovoe[.]ru			
nashsosnovoborsk[.]ru	nashsosnovoborsk[.]ru			
nastroenie-74[.]ru	nastroenie-74[.]ru			
nastroenie-ch[.]ru	nastroenie-ch[.]ru			
naukograd-reutov[.]ru	naukograd-reutov[.]ru			
navolne-gazeta[.]ru	navolne-gazeta[.]ru			
nazarovoonline[.]ru	nazarovoonline[.]ru			
nd-gazeta[.]ru	nd-gazeta[.]ru			
nekrasov-slovo[.]ru	nekrasov-slovo[.]ru			
nemanskie-vesti[.]ru	nemanskie-vesti[.]ru			
nerekht-vecherka[.]ru	nerekht-vecherka[.]ru			
netterroru[.]ru	netterroru[.]ru			
nevelife[.]ru	nevelife[.]ru			
new-dagestan[.]ru	new-dagestan[.]ru			
new-kandalaksha[.]ru	new-kandalaksha[.]ru			
nf-vestnik[.]ru	nf-vestnik[.]ru			
ng-gazeta[.]ru	ng-gazeta[.]ru			
nikvedomosti[.]ru	nikvedomosti[.]ru			
nivagazeta[.]ru	nivagazeta[.]ru			
nizhneudinsk-vestnik[.]ru	nizhneudinsk-vestnik[.]ru			
nj-orel[.]ru	nj-orel[.]ru			
nk-vesti[.]ru	nk-vesti[.]ru			
nogaydav[.]ru	nogaydav[.]ru			
noginskie-vedomosti[.]ru	noginskie-vedomosti[.]ru			
nogir-nedelya[.]ru	nogir-nedelya[.]ru			
norilsk-vecherka[.]ru	norilsk-vecherka[.]ru			
nov-pitkaranta[.]ru	nov-pitkaranta[.]ru			
novayagazeta-glazov[.]ru	novayagazeta-glazov[.]ru			
novi-den[.]info	novi-den[.]info			
novi-urengoy[.]ru	novi-urengoy[.]ru			
novivzglyad-kirov[.]ru	novivzglyad-kirov[.]ru			
noviyvzglyad-kirov[.]ru	noviyvzglyad-kirov[.]ru			
novjizn[.]ru	novjizn[.]ru			
novoaleksandrovsky[.]ru	novoaleksandrovsky[.]ru			
novoalt-pravda[.]ru	novoalt-pravda[.]ru			
novocherkassk-week[.]ru	novocherkassk-week[.]ru			
novohopersk-zori[.]ru	novohopersk-zori[.]ru			
novokubansk-news[.]ru	novokubansk-news[.]ru			
novokuznetsk-press[.]ru	novokuznetsk-press[.]ru			
novopravda[.]ru	novopravda[.]ru			
novoselitskoe[.]info	novoselitskoe[.]info			
novosti-ikryanogo[.]ru	novosti-ikryanogo[.]ru			
novosti-kohmi[.]ru	novosti-kohmi[.]ru			
novosti-uezda[.]ru	novosti-uezda[.]ru			
novosti-zav[.]ru	novosti-zav[.]ru			
novotitarovskaya[.]ru	novotitarovskaya[.]ru			
novouralskaya-gazeta[.]ru	novouralskaya-gazeta[.]ru			
novousman[.]ru	novousman[.]ru			
novovremya[.]ru	novovremya[.]ru			
novozybkov-vesti[.]ru	novozybkov-vesti[.]ru			
novtikhvin[.]ru	novtikhvin[.]ru			
novutpo[.]ru	novutpo[.]ru			
novzjizn[.]ru	novzjizn[.]ru			
noyabrsk-gazeta[.]ru	noyabrsk-gazeta[.]ru			
nr-odincovo[.]ru	nr-odincovo[.]ru			
nsk-gazeta[.]ru	nsk-gazeta[.]ru			
ntavda[.]ru	ntavda[.]ru			
nv-vestnik[.]ru	nv-vestnik[.]ru			
nyagan-info[.]ru	nyagan-info[.]ru			
nzhizn[.]ru	nzhizn[.]ru			
nzjizn[.]ru	nzjizn[.]ru			
ob-gazeta[.]ru	ob-gazeta[.]ru			
obbereg[.]ru	obbereg[.]ru			
oboyangorod[.]ru	oboyangorod[.]ru			
obraz-asino[.]ru	obraz-asino[.]ru			
ogni-belorechenska[.]ru	ogni-belorechenska[.]ru			
ogni-slantsy[.]ru	ogni-slantsy[.]ru			
ognigorod[.]ru	ognigorod[.]ru			
ohapress[.]ru	ohapress[.]ru			
ohotsk-pravda[.]ru	ohotsk-pravda[.]ru			
okno-ch[.]ru	okno-ch[.]ru			
okno-sn[.]ru	okno-sn[.]ru			
okno-uzhura[.]ru	okno-uzhura[.]ru			
okt-iskra[.]ru	okt-iskra[.]ru			
oktday[.]ru	oktday[.]ru			
oktiskra74[.]ru	oktiskra74[.]ru			
okttime[.]ru	okttime[.]ru			
oktznamya[.]ru	oktznamya[.]ru			
olenegorsk-city[.]ru	olenegorsk-city[.]ru			
olonets-sosed[.]ru	olonets-sosed[.]ru			
olsky-vestnik[.]ru	olsky-vestnik[.]ru			
olyutor-novosti[.]ru	olyutor-novosti[.]ru			
omegatrade[.]ru	omegatrade[.]ru			
omutninsk-vedomosti[.]ru	omutninsk-vedomosti[.]ru			
ooo-remontnik[.]ru	ooo-remontnik[.]ru			
opochka-vestnik[.]ru	opochka-vestnik[.]ru			
orichi-inform[.]ru	orichi-inform[.]ru			
osinniki-favorit[.]ru	osinniki-favorit[.]ru			
oskolzori[.]ru	oskolzori[.]ru			
ostrogozhtsi[.]ru	ostrogozhtsi[.]ru			
osuzdal[.]ru	osuzdal[.]ru			
osvod-crimea[.]ru	osvod-crimea[.]ru			
otkritaya-linia[.]ru	otkritaya-linia[.]ru			
otkrytaya-linia[.]ru	otkrytaya-linia[.]ru			
otradnaya-gazeta[.]ru	otradnaya-gazeta[.]ru			
otradnaya-info[.]ru	otradnaya-info[.]ru			
palana-news[.]ru	palana-news[.]ru			
panorama-elizovo[.]ru	panorama-elizovo[.]ru			
parfino-news[.]ru	parfino-news[.]ru			
patriot-alt[.]ru	patriot-alt[.]ru			
pavlov-gazeta[.]ru	pavlov-gazeta[.]ru			
pavlovsk-youth[.]ru	pavlovsk-youth[.]ru			
pechenga-today[.]ru	pechenga-today[.]ru			
pechori-online[.]ru	pechori-online[.]ru			
penzhinsky[.]ru	penzhinsky[.]ru			
pereslavlife[.]ru	pereslavlife[.]ru			
pervouralsk-hronika[.]ru	pervouralsk-hronika[.]ru			
petrovsk-zabaykalsk[.]ru	petrovsk-zabaykalsk[.]ru			
plamya-v[.]ru	plamya-v[.]ru			
planeta-nadim[.]ru	planeta-nadim[.]ru			
plusred[.]ru	plusred[.]ru			
pobeda-kn[.]ru	pobeda-kn[.]ru			
pochepvestnik[.]ru	pochepvestnik[.]ru			
pochinok-smolensk[.]ru	pochinok-smolensk[.]ru			
poehaligagarin[.]ru	poehaligagarin[.]ru			
pogar-vesti[.]ru	pogar-vesti[.]ru			
pokachi-time[.]ru	pokachi-time[.]ru			
polarzori[.]ru	polarzori[.]ru			
polesskyvestnik[.]ru	polesskyvestnik[.]ru			
poltavskaya-jizn[.]ru	poltavskaya-jizn[.]ru			
polyarny-ural[.]ru	polyarny-ural[.]ru			
poperinat[.]ru	poperinat[.]ru			
porhov-city[.]ru	porhov-city[.]ru			
poselok-anna[.]ru	poselok-anna[.]ru			
pp-vesti[.]ru	pp-vesti[.]ru			
pr-gorod[.]ru	pr-gorod[.]ru			
pravda-k[.]ru	pravda-k[.]ru			
pravda-s[.]ru	pravda-s[.]ru			
pravfond[.]ru	pravfond[.]ru			
pravfund[.]ru	pravfund[.]ru			
pravoznat-39[.]ru	pravoznat-39[.]ru			
pregradnaya-gazeta[.]ru	pregradnaya-gazeta[.]ru			
priangarie-mv[.]ru	priangarie-mv[.]ru			
prichernomorie[.]ru	prichernomorie[.]ru			
prim-zori[.]ru	prim-zori[.]ru			
prinevskii[.]ru	prinevskii[.]ru			
prioskolye[.]ru	prioskolye[.]ru			
prisayanie[.]ru	prisayanie[.]ru			
prisivashie[.]ru	prisivashie[.]ru			
privet-timashevsk[.]ru	privet-timashevsk[.]ru			
privolzhskaya-volna[.]ru	privolzhskaya-volna[.]ru			
priyutnoe[.]ru	priyutnoe[.]ru			
priziv-harovsk[.]ru	priziv-harovsk[.]ru			
priziv-press[.]ru	priziv-press[.]ru			
proberezovo[.]ru	proberezovo[.]ru			
prodelo-s[.]ru	prodelo-s[.]ru			
proiskitim[.]ru	proiskitim[.]ru			
prokopievsk-variant[.]ru	prokopievsk-variant[.]ru			
prokrym[.]info	prokrym[.]info			
prom-kemerovo[.]ru	prom-kemerovo[.]ru			
promagadan[.]ru	promagadan[.]ru			
pronikolskoe[.]ru	pronikolskoe[.]ru			
pronskie-izvestia[.]ru	pronskie-izvestia[.]ru			
pronskie-izvestiya[.]ru	pronskie-izvestiya[.]ru			
prootradnoe[.]ru	prootradnoe[.]ru			
propeterburg[.]info	propeterburg[.]info			
prosaratov[.]info	prosaratov[.]info			
prosevastopol[.]info	prosevastopol[.]info			
prospekt-sochi[.]com	prospekt-sochi[.]com			
protvinskie-berega[.]ru	protvinskie-berega[.]ru			
provintsialnoe-zerkalo[.]ru	provintsialnoe-zerkalo[.]ru			
provladimir[.]info	provladimir[.]info			
provnews[.]ru	provnews[.]ru			
pryamitsino-news[.]ru	pryamitsino-news[.]ru			
pryazhvesti[.]ru	pryazhvesti[.]ru			
psebaets[.]ru	psebaets[.]ru			
psebay-dni[.]ru	psebay-dni[.]ru			
pudog[.]ru	pudog[.]ru			
pulsea[.]ru	pulsea[.]ru			
pulsnedeli[.]ru	pulsnedeli[.]ru			
pushkin-kray[.]ru	pushkin-kray[.]ru			
putokt[.]ru	putokt[.]ru			
rab-slovo[.]ru	rab-slovo[.]ru			
rabslovo[.]ru	rabslovo[.]ru			
raduzhny-info[.]ru	raduzhny-info[.]ru			
raivestn[.]ru	raivestn[.]ru			
ramon-anons[.]ru	ramon-anons[.]ru			
rassvet-balezino[.]ru	rassvet-balezino[.]ru			
rb-yar[.]ru	rb-yar[.]ru			
rdzem[.]ru	rdzem[.]ru			
rech-vol[.]ru	rech-vol[.]ru			
red-banner[.]ru	red-banner[.]ru			
red-yar[.]ru	red-yar[.]ru			
revda-news[.]ru	revda-news[.]ru			
rilskie-vesti[.]ru	rilskie-vesti[.]ru			
ritm-rybnoe[.]ru	ritm-rybnoe[.]ru			
rodina-shuya[.]ru	rodina-shuya[.]ru			
rodniki-gazeta[.]ru	rodniki-gazeta[.]ru			
rodrov[.]ru	rodrov[.]ru			
rossosh-vedomosti[.]ru	rossosh-vedomosti[.]ru			
rostov-province[.]ru	rostov-province[.]ru			
rov-niva[.]ru	rov-niva[.]ru			
rudnyansky-raion[.]ru	rudnyansky-raion[.]ru			
rusakartvelo[.]org	rusakartvelo[.]org			
rutulnews[.]ru	rutulnews[.]ru			
ruvek[.]info	ruvek[.]info			
ruza-express[.]ru	ruza-express[.]ru			
rylsk-vesti[.]ru	rylsk-vesti[.]ru			
rzhev-press[.]ru	rzhev-press[.]ru			
rzpravda[.]ru	rzpravda[.]ru			
s-pravda[.]ru	s-pravda[.]ru			
s-put[.]ru	s-put[.]ru			
s-vektor[.]ru	s-vektor[.]ru			
saintanna[.]ru	saintanna[.]ru			
sakipress[.]ru	sakipress[.]ru			
saklife[.]ru	saklife[.]ru			
salskaya-step[.]ru	salskaya-step[.]ru			
sambo[.]com	sambo[.]com			
samolet-v[.]ru	samolet-v[.]ru			
samotlorexpress[.]ru	samotlorexpress[.]ru			
samotlorpress[.]ru	samotlorpress[.]ru			
sarov-vedomosti[.]ru	sarov-vedomosti[.]ru			
sarovskie-vedomosti[.]ru	sarovskie-vedomosti[.]ru			
sarvesti[.]info	sarvesti[.]info			
sasovskie-vesti[.]ru	sasovskie-vesti[.]ru			
sbdialog[.]ru	sbdialog[.]ru			
segeja[.]ru	segeja[.]ru			
segeza[.]ru	segeza[.]ru			
segezha-vektor[.]ru	segezha-vektor[.]ru			
sel-nov[.]ru	sel-nov[.]ru			
sel-pr[.]ru	sel-pr[.]ru			
sel-pravda[.]ru	sel-pravda[.]ru			
sel-tas[.]ru	sel-tas[.]ru			
selenga-press[.]ru	selenga-press[.]ru			
selivanovskie-zori[.]ru	selivanovskie-zori[.]ru			
selnov-nesterov[.]ru	selnov-nesterov[.]ru			
selnov-prim[.]ru	selnov-prim[.]ru			
selnov-v[.]ru	selnov-v[.]ru			
selosamashki[.]ru	selosamashki[.]ru			
selskaya-okolitsa[.]ru	selskaya-okolitsa[.]ru			
seltr[.]ru	seltr[.]ru			
seltso-pravda[.]ru	seltso-pravda[.]ru			
seltsovskaya-pravda[.]ru	seltsovskaya-pravda[.]ru			
semenovsky-kupets[.]ru	semenovsky-kupets[.]ru			
semibratovo-prostory[.]ru	semibratovo-prostory[.]ru			
semikarakorskgazeta[.]ru	semikarakorskgazeta[.]ru			
semiluki-vestnik[.]ru	semiluki-vestnik[.]ru			
semkargazeta[.]ru	semkargazeta[.]ru			
sergievposadpress[.]ru	sergievposadpress[.]ru			
sertolovo-nedelya[.]ru	sertolovo-nedelya[.]ru			
sevastopol-sovet[.]ru	sevastopol-sovet[.]ru			
sever-podmoskovia[.]ru	sever-podmoskovia[.]ru			
severpravda[.]ru	severpravda[.]ru			
seversk-digest[.]ru	seversk-digest[.]ru			
sevkurilsk[.]ru	sevkurilsk[.]ru			
sgazeta-op[.]ru	sgazeta-op[.]ru			
sgzt[.]com	sgzt[.]com			
sh-vestnik[.]ru	sh-vestnik[.]ru			
shadrinski-vestnik[.]ru	shadrinski-vestnik[.]ru			
shaht-vest[.]ru	shaht-vest[.]ru			
shali-info[.]ru	shali-info[.]ru			
shalinskoe[.]ru	shalinskoe[.]ru			
shchigrovskie-zori[.]ru	shchigrovskie-zori[.]ru			
shchigry-zori[.]ru	shchigry-zori[.]ru			
shegarka-press[.]ru	shegarka-press[.]ru			
sheksnagazeta[.]ru	sheksnagazeta[.]ru			
shelkovchanka[.]ru	shelkovchanka[.]ru			
shilovski-put[.]ru	shilovski-put[.]ru			
shiravest[.]ru	shiravest[.]ru			
sholem[.]ru	sholem[.]ru			
shushenskoevremya[.]ru	shushenskoevremya[.]ru			
shuya-teleskop[.]ru	shuya-teleskop[.]ru			
sibnedelya[.]ru	sibnedelya[.]ru			
sibpanorama[.]ru	sibpanorama[.]ru			
site[.]ru	site[.]ru			
skopin-avtoagregat[.]ru	skopin-avtoagregat[.]ru			
slavsknews[.]ru	slavsknews[.]ru			
slavyanskaya-gazeta[.]ru	slavyanskaya-gazeta[.]ru			
slobodskoi[.]ru	slobodskoi[.]ru			
slovo-neftyanika[.]ru	slovo-neftyanika[.]ru			
sm-vesti[.]ru	sm-vesti[.]ru			
smi-holm[.]ru	smi-holm[.]ru			
smi-volna[.]ru	smi-volna[.]ru			
snbalahta[.]ru	snbalahta[.]ru			
snezhnogorsk-gazeta[.]ru	snezhnogorsk-gazeta[.]ru			
sobinka-gazeta[.]ru	sobinka-gazeta[.]ru			
sol-meridian[.]ru	sol-meridian[.]ru			
soltsy[.]ru	soltsy[.]ru			
sorsk-gazeta[.]ru	sorsk-gazeta[.]ru			
sosedskievesti[.]ru	sosedskievesti[.]ru			
sov-zap[.]ru	sov-zap[.]ru			
sov-zvezda[.]ru	sov-zvezda[.]ru			
sovet-serpukhov[.]ru	sovet-serpukhov[.]ru			
sovetsk-vopros[.]ru	sovetsk-vopros[.]ru			
spasskoe-vremya[.]ru	spasskoe-vremya[.]ru			
sprostor[.]ru	sprostor[.]ru			
sputnik-sarapul[.]ru	sputnik-sarapul[.]ru			
stal-iskra[.]ru	stal-iskra[.]ru			
stanovlyanskie-dni[.]ru	stanovlyanskie-dni[.]ru			
starodublife[.]ru	starodublife[.]ru			
starorusski-krai[.]ru	starorusski-krai[.]ru			
step-nov[.]ru	step-nov[.]ru			
stepkrai[.]ru	stepkrai[.]ru			
stepnaya-nov[.]ru	stepnaya-nov[.]ru			
strezhevoy-svetofor[.]ru	strezhevoy-svetofor[.]ru			
stroy-armavir[.]ru	stroy-armavir[.]ru			
sudogda-city[.]ru	sudogda-city[.]ru			
sudzha-vestnik[.]ru	sudzha-vestnik[.]ru			
sunjpravda[.]ru	sunjpravda[.]ru			
suntargazeta[.]ru	suntargazeta[.]ru			
sunzha-pravda[.]ru	sunzha-pravda[.]ru			
sunzha-press[.]ru	sunzha-press[.]ru			
surazhvestnik[.]ru	surazhvestnik[.]ru			
surgut-novosti[.]ru	surgut-novosti[.]ru			
suzemka-press[.]ru	suzemka-press[.]ru			
suzun-intellect[.]ru	suzun-intellect[.]ru			
sv65[.]ru	sv65[.]ru			
svetlograd-today[.]ru	svetlograd-today[.]ru			
svetvesti[.]ru	svetvesti[.]ru			
svetvestnik[.]ru	svetvestnik[.]ru			
svobodni-trud[.]ru	svobodni-trud[.]ru			
svobodnygolos[.]ru	svobodnygolos[.]ru			
svoya-gazeta[.]ru	svoya-gazeta[.]ru			
sysert-press[.]ru	sysert-press[.]ru			
taganrog-time[.]ru	taganrog-time[.]ru			
taishetskaya-nedelya[.]ru	taishetskaya-nedelya[.]ru			
talovaya-press[.]ru	talovaya-press[.]ru			
talzhizn[.]ru	talzhizn[.]ru			
tarys[.]ru	tarys[.]ru			
tashtyp3[.]ru	tashtyp3[.]ru			
tbilnews[.]ru	tbilnews[.]ru			
teikovo-gazeta[.]ru	teikovo-gazeta[.]ru			
temryuk-kompas[.]ru	temryuk-kompas[.]ru			
temryuk-news[.]ru	temryuk-news[.]ru			
terbunskie-vesti[.]ru	terbunskie-vesti[.]ru			
terra-19tv[.]ru	terra-19tv[.]ru			
tersky-raion[.]ru	tersky-raion[.]ru			
tigil-gazeta[.]ru	tigil-gazeta[.]ru			
tikhoretski-vestnik[.]ru	tikhoretski-vestnik[.]ru			
tilichiki-zemlya[.]ru	tilichiki-zemlya[.]ru			
toguchin-time[.]ru	toguchin-time[.]ru			
tommot-listok[.]ru	tommot-listok[.]ru			
tompon[.]ru	tompon[.]ru			
torzhok-life[.]ru	torzhok-life[.]ru			
tosvestnik[.]ru	tosvestnik[.]ru			
totmagazeta[.]ru	totmagazeta[.]ru			
tovarkovo-plus[.]ru	tovarkovo-plus[.]ru			
tovarkovo-plyus[.]ru	tovarkovo-plyus[.]ru			
tribuna-komi[.]ru	tribuna-komi[.]ru			
tribuna-urala[.]ru	tribuna-urala[.]ru			
tribuna22[.]ru	tribuna22[.]ru			
tribunakomi[.]ru	tribunakomi[.]ru			
troitskoevremya[.]ru	troitskoevremya[.]ru			
trubchevskaya-okruga[.]ru	trubchevskaya-okruga[.]ru			
trudovaya-vakhta[.]ru	trudovaya-vakhta[.]ru			
tsaganaman[.]ru	tsaganaman[.]ru			
tsahvoa[.]ru	tsahvoa[.]ru			
tsimlyansk[.]ru	tsimlyansk[.]ru			
tsotsi-yurt[.]info	tsotsi-yurt[.]info			
tsotsyiurt[.]ru	tsotsyiurt[.]ru			
tulski-telegraf[.]ru	tulski-telegraf[.]ru			
tulunski-vestnik[.]ru	tulunski-vestnik[.]ru			
tur-izvestiya[.]ru	tur-izvestiya[.]ru			
tura-news[.]ru	tura-news[.]ru			
turan-gazeta[.]ru	turan-gazeta[.]ru			
turochak-life[.]ru	turochak-life[.]ru			
turval[.]ru	turval[.]ru			
tutaev-gazeta[.]ru	tutaev-gazeta[.]ru			
tuv-pravda[.]ru	tuv-pravda[.]ru			
tuva-ter[.]ru	tuva-ter[.]ru			
tuvexpress[.]ru	tuvexpress[.]ru			
tvoi-den[.]ru	tvoi-den[.]ru			
tvoi-karasuk[.]ru	tvoi-karasuk[.]ru			
tvoy-pozitiv[.]ru	tvoy-pozitiv[.]ru			
tvoya-gazeta[.]info	tvoya-gazeta[.]info			
tvoyagazeta-so[.]ru	tvoyagazeta-so[.]ru			
tvybor[.]ru	tvybor[.]ru			
u-vesti[.]ru	u-vesti[.]ru			
uagazeta[.]ru	uagazeta[.]ru			
uchkeken-news[.]ru	uchkeken-news[.]ru			
udachny-den[.]ru	udachny-den[.]ru			
udomlya-starina[.]ru	udomlya-starina[.]ru			
uglegorskns[.]ru	uglegorskns[.]ru			
uglich-vest[.]ru	uglich-vest[.]ru			
ujadyg[.]ru	ujadyg[.]ru			
uk-nedelya[.]ru	uk-nedelya[.]ru			
uk-vestnik[.]ru	uk-vestnik[.]ru			
ul-perekrestok[.]ru	ul-perekrestok[.]ru			
ulug-khem[.]ru	ulug-khem[.]ru			
um-vest[.]ru	um-vest[.]ru			
um-vestnik[.]ru	um-vestnik[.]ru			
umanskaya-gazeta[.]ru	umanskaya-gazeta[.]ru			
unecha-express[.]ru	unecha-express[.]ru			
uporovskoe-vremya[.]ru	uporovskoe-vremya[.]ru			
uraiski-kurier[.]ru	uraiski-kurier[.]ru			
urogay-smol[.]ru	urogay-smol[.]ru			
urus-martan[.]info	urus-martan[.]info			
uryupinskgazeta[.]ru	uryupinskgazeta[.]ru			
ussuriysk-news[.]ru	ussuriysk-news[.]ru			
ust-bolshereczk[.]ru	ust-bolshereczk[.]ru			
ust-bolsheretsk[.]ru	ust-bolsheretsk[.]ru			
ust-ilim[.]press	ust-ilim[.]press			
ust-kutskaya[.]ru	ust-kutskaya[.]ru			
ustkam-vremya[.]ru	ustkam-vremya[.]ru			
ustvesti[.]ru	ustvesti[.]ru			
ustyugvestnik[.]ru	ustyugvestnik[.]ru			
utrolagani[.]ru	utrolagani[.]ru			
uva-projector[.]ru	uva-projector[.]ru			
uyar-rassvety[.]ru	uyar-rassvety[.]ru			
uzhur-volost[.]ru	uzhur-volost[.]ru			
v-dalgor[.]ru	v-dalgor[.]ru			
v-gorizont[.]ru	v-gorizont[.]ru			
v-kizilyurt[.]ru	v-kizilyurt[.]ru			
v-nerungri[.]ru	v-nerungri[.]ru			
v-neryungri[.]ru	v-neryungri[.]ru			
vagai-pravda[.]ru	vagai-pravda[.]ru			
val-zvezda[.]ru	val-zvezda[.]ru			
valdaygazeta[.]ru	valdaygazeta[.]ru			
vash-mikhailovsk[.]ru	vash-mikhailovsk[.]ru			
vashe-prav[.]ru	vashe-prav[.]ru			
vchaspik[.]ru	vchaspik[.]ru			
vech-aldan[.]ru	vech-aldan[.]ru			
vecherka-kuybyshev[.]ru	vecherka-kuybyshev[.]ru			
vecherka-ner[.]ru	vecherka-ner[.]ru			
vecherka-obninsk[.]ru	vecherka-obninsk[.]ru			
vecherkandalaksha[.]ru	vecherkandalaksha[.]ru			
vechernee-petuhovo[.]ru	vechernee-petuhovo[.]ru			
vecherni-karachev[.]ru	vecherni-karachev[.]ru			
vecherni-obninsk[.]ru	vecherni-obninsk[.]ru			
vecherni-ustilim[.]ru	vecherni-ustilim[.]ru			
vecherniy-sudak[.]ru	vecherniy-sudak[.]ru			
vecherny-ishim[.]ru	vecherny-ishim[.]ru			
vektor-nedeli[.]ru	vektor-nedeli[.]ru			
vektor-tatarsk[.]ru	vektor-tatarsk[.]ru			
veloboz[.]ru	veloboz[.]ru			
verhnednepr[.]ru	verhnednepr[.]ru			
verhneket[.]ru	verhneket[.]ru			
verkhnekamie[.]ru	verkhnekamie[.]ru			
verny-put[.]ru	verny-put[.]ru			
ves-gubkinsky[.]ru	ves-gubkinsky[.]ru			
ves-mirny[.]ru	ves-mirny[.]ru			
ves-rybinsk[.]ru	ves-rybinsk[.]ru			
ves-severomorsk[.]ru	ves-severomorsk[.]ru			
ves-volgodonsk[.]ru	ves-volgodonsk[.]ru			
vesti-ah[.]ru	vesti-ah[.]ru			
vesti-bu[.]ru	vesti-bu[.]ru			
vesti-kaluga[.]ru	vesti-kaluga[.]ru			
vesti-ls[.]ru	vesti-ls[.]ru			
vesti-mezhdurechensk[.]ru	vesti-mezhdurechensk[.]ru			
vesti-millerovo[.]ru	vesti-millerovo[.]ru			
vesti-morozovsk[.]ru	vesti-morozovsk[.]ru			
vesti-p[.]ru	vesti-p[.]ru			
vesti-yantarnogo[.]ru	vesti-yantarnogo[.]ru			
vesti61[.]ru	vesti61[.]ru			
vestiharabali[.]ru	vestiharabali[.]ru			
vestiv[.]ru	vestiv[.]ru			
vestivsredu[.]ru	vestivsredu[.]ru			
vestnik-baltiyska[.]ru	vestnik-baltiyska[.]ru			
vestnik-kovdora[.]ru	vestnik-kovdora[.]ru			
vestnik-ladushkina[.]ru	vestnik-ladushkina[.]ru			
vestnik-nachalovo[.]ru	vestnik-nachalovo[.]ru			
vestnik-predgoria[.]ru	vestnik-predgoria[.]ru			
vestnik-pv[.]ru	vestnik-pv[.]ru			
vestnik-selsovetov[.]ru	vestnik-selsovetov[.]ru			
vestnik-surovikino[.]ru	vestnik-surovikino[.]ru			
vestnik-tm[.]ru	vestnik-tm[.]ru			
vestnik-zav[.]ru	vestnik-zav[.]ru			
vestniklk[.]ru	vestniklk[.]ru			
vestnikpr[.]ru	vestnikpr[.]ru			
vestniktaimyra[.]ru	vestniktaimyra[.]ru			
veteran-pravda[.]ru	veteran-pravda[.]ru			
viborkazan[.]ru	viborkazan[.]ru			
vilyuchinsk-izvestia[.]ru	vilyuchinsk-izvestia[.]ru			
vilyuisk-gorizont[.]ru	vilyuisk-gorizont[.]ru			
vimpel-rubtsovsk[.]ru	vimpel-rubtsovsk[.]ru			
vitegoria[.]ru	vitegoria[.]ru			
vitzori[.]ru	vitzori[.]ru			
vltavacrimea[.]ru	vltavacrimea[.]ru			
vlz-stroitel[.]ru	vlz-stroitel[.]ru			
voinskayaslava[.]ru	voinskayaslava[.]ru			
volna-zelenogradsk[.]ru	volna-zelenogradsk[.]ru			
vologda-p[.]ru	vologda-p[.]ru			
vologodskylad[.]ru	vologodskylad[.]ru			
volokolamskoe-shosse[.]ru	volokolamskoe-shosse[.]ru			
voshod57[.]ru	voshod57[.]ru			
voshodprim[.]ru	voshodprim[.]ru			
voshodvanino[.]ru	voshodvanino[.]ru			
voskresenskie-dni[.]ru	voskresenskie-dni[.]ru			
vostok-alt[.]ru	vostok-alt[.]ru			
vostregion[.]ru	vostregion[.]ru			
votkinsk-segodnya[.]ru	votkinsk-segodnya[.]ru			
vpered-kb[.]ru	vpered-kb[.]ru			
vpered-m[.]ru	vpered-m[.]ru			
vpered-zori[.]ru	vpered-zori[.]ru			
vpered57[.]ru	vpered57[.]ru			
vperedbel[.]ru	vperedbel[.]ru			
vpereduralan[.]ru	vpereduralan[.]ru			
vremya-molchanovo[.]ru	vremya-molchanovo[.]ru			
vse-o-zhizni[.]ru	vse-o-zhizni[.]ru			
vsev-gazeta[.]ru	vsev-gazeta[.]ru			
vsya-igra[.]ru	vsya-igra[.]ru			
vvanino[.]ru	vvanino[.]ru			
vvp-kotelnich[.]ru	vvp-kotelnich[.]ru			
vyazemski[.]ru	vyazemski[.]ru			
vyazemskie-vedomosti[.]ru	vyazemskie-vedomosti[.]ru			
vyazma-vedomosti[.]ru	vyazma-vedomosti[.]ru			
vyazniki-nedelya[.]ru	vyazniki-nedelya[.]ru			
vybor-krasnogoria[.]ru	vybor-krasnogoria[.]ru			
vyborg-avtograf[.]ru	vyborg-avtograf[.]ru			
vygonichi[.]ru	vygonichi[.]ru			
wyksa-r[.]ru	wyksa-r[.]ru			
xn----8sbjhmaeayppbwkpbar6b[.]xn--p1ai	xn----8sbjhmaeayppbwkpbar6b[.]xn--p1ai			
yagodnoe[.]press	yagodnoe[.]press			
yalutor-volna[.]ru	yalutor-volna[.]ru			
yamal-time[.]ru	yamal-time[.]ru			
yamaltime[.]ru	yamaltime[.]ru			
yar-gorod[.]ru	yar-gorod[.]ru			
yarbiz[.]info	yarbiz[.]info			
yarkovosti[.]ru	yarkovosti[.]ru			
yashalta-dnevnik[.]ru	yashalta-dnevnik[.]ru			
yashkur-bodya[.]ru	yashkur-bodya[.]ru			
yaskluch[.]ru	yaskluch[.]ru			
yugorski-glagol[.]ru	yugorski-glagol[.]ru			
yurga-nov[.]ru	yurga-nov[.]ru			
yuriev-polski[.]ru	yuriev-polski[.]ru			
z-steppe[.]ru	z-steppe[.]ru			
za-izobilie57[.]ru	za-izobilie57[.]ru			
za-urozai[.]ru	za-urozai[.]ru			
zabaykalsk-vedomosti[.]ru	zabaykalsk-vedomosti[.]ru			
zabrabochii[.]ru	zabrabochii[.]ru			
zadonskie-zori[.]ru	zadonskie-zori[.]ru			
zalegoshch[.]ru	zalegoshch[.]ru			
zaozerny-kray[.]ru	zaozerny-kray[.]ru			
zaplica[.]ru	zaplica[.]ru			
zapolyarny-region[.]ru	zapolyarny-region[.]ru			
zaraisk-news[.]ru	zaraisk-news[.]ru			
zariagazeta[.]ru	zariagazeta[.]ru			
zarya-kgorod[.]ru	zarya-kgorod[.]ru			
zarya-kurg[.]ru	zarya-kurg[.]ru			
zarya-sev[.]ru	zarya-sev[.]ru			
zarya-urala[.]ru	zarya-urala[.]ru			
zarya57[.]ru	zarya57[.]ru			
zaryakaspiya[.]ru	zaryakaspiya[.]ru			
zaryapirov[.]ru	zaryapirov[.]ru			
zatozelenogorsk[.]ru	zatozelenogorsk[.]ru			
zavety-i[.]ru	zavety-i[.]ru			
zavety-len[.]ru	zavety-len[.]ru			
zavodoukovsk-gazeta[.]ru	zavodoukovsk-gazeta[.]ru			
zavyalovsky-flag[.]ru	zavyalovsky-flag[.]ru			
zelenchukpravda[.]ru	zelenchukpravda[.]ru			
zemlya-n[.]ru	zemlya-n[.]ru			
zempodolsk[.]ru	zempodolsk[.]ru			
zemskie-vesti[.]ru	zemskie-vesti[.]ru			
zemvv[.]ru	zemvv[.]ru			
zernograd[.]biz	zernograd[.]biz			
zhatay[.]com	zhatay[.]com			
zheleznogorsk-panorama[.]ru	zheleznogorsk-panorama[.]ru			
zhen-dagestana[.]ru	zhen-dagestana[.]ru			
ziminski-region[.]ru	ziminski-region[.]ru			
zmi-novosni[.]ru	zmi-novosni[.]ru			
zmievka-novosti[.]ru	zmievka-novosti[.]ru			
zn-press[.]ru	zn-press[.]ru			
zn-smol[.]ru	zn-smol[.]ru			
znamensk-tribuna[.]ru	znamensk-tribuna[.]ru			
znamenskaya-tribuna[.]ru	znamenskaya-tribuna[.]ru			
znamya-plast[.]ru	znamya-plast[.]ru			
znamya-trud[.]ru	znamya-trud[.]ru			
zntrud[.]ru	zntrud[.]ru			
zntruda[.]ru	zntruda[.]ru			
zolotuhino-raion[.]ru	zolotuhino-raion[.]ru			
zvezda-langepas[.]ru	zvezda-langepas[.]ru			
zvezda-sah[.]ru	zvezda-sah[.]ru			
infoshos[.]ru	infoshos[.]ru			
akhun[.]ru	akhun[.]ru			
dommechta[.]com	dommechta[.]com			
k-koncept[.]ru	k-koncept[.]ru			
kan-imo[.]ru	kan-imo[.]ru			
uspeh-dom[.]ru	uspeh-dom[.]ru			
metall-forma[.]ru	metall-forma[.]ru			
metall-vitamet[.]ru	metall-vitamet[.]ru			
metals-trading[.]pro	metals-trading[.]pro			
ralkon[.]ru	ralkon[.]ru			
pl-oil[.]ru	pl-oil[.]ru			
techpolicom[.]ru	techpolicom[.]ru			
techpolycom[.]ru	techpolycom[.]ru			
rusoptics[.]com	rusoptics[.]com			
uniones[.]ru	uniones[.]ru			
ssmp[.]ru	ssmp[.]ru			
sneginca[.]ru	sneginca[.]ru			
leaducation[.]ru	leaducation[.]ru			
volnoe-delo[.]org	volnoe-delo[.]org			
ak-sp[.]ru	ak-sp[.]ru			
labrand[.]ru	labrand[.]ru			
prosambo[.]com	prosambo[.]com			
sambist[.]ru	sambist[.]ru			
referee[.]ru	referee[.]ru			
ssvr[.]ru	ssvr[.]ru			
amur-trassa[.]ru	amur-trassa[.]ru			
dorconf2009[.]ru	dorconf2009[.]ru			
opengovfda[.]ru	opengovfda[.]ru			
romanovy400[.]ru	romanovy400[.]ru			
romanov-2013[.]ru	romanov-2013[.]ru			
rus1150[.]org	rus1150[.]org			
moi-deputat[.]ru	moi-deputat[.]ru			
moy-deputat[.]ru	moy-deputat[.]ru			
chyi[.]ru	chyi[.]ru			
ehoosha[.]com	ehoosha[.]com			
ehoosha[.]ru	ehoosha[.]ru			
tvybor[.]ru	tvybor[.]ru			
infokirgizia[.]ru	infokirgizia[.]ru			
kobzarev[.]com	kobzarev[.]com			
unisco[.]ru	unisco[.]ru			
icrea[.]ru	icrea[.]ru			
Astra-Plus	astra-plus[.]ru			
turval[.]ru	turval[.]ru			
genocide-in-ossetia[.]com	genocide-in-ossetia[.]com			
victoryforpeace[.]ru	victoryforpeace[.]ru			

=== John Mark Dougan / CopyCop / Operation False Façade ===
John Mark Dougan is a former sheriff from Florida, who operates a variety of websites. Russia's primary intelligence agency, the GRU, provides Dougan with financial and material resources to assist with the websites, with the goal of providing disinformation to the American public. One of the resources is a generative AI tool that creates disinformation in the form of plausible social media posts. Funding also came from a Russian institute founded by Aleksandr Dugin. As of May 2024, at least 167 website domains, dubbed CopyCop, are likely linked to Dougan, who is described by NewsGuard as a "Russian operative". Dougan has lived in Russia since 2017.

Name	Domain	Status	Notes	Sources
The Arizona Observer			Spoof of the Arizona Observer, a 20th century newspaper in the United States.	
The Austin Crier				
bbc-uk.news	bbc-uk.news	Defunct	Spoof of the BBC.	
The Boston Times	bostontimes[.]org		Spoof of The Boston Times, a 19th-20th century newspaper in the United States. Asserted by France 24 of having its logo created by a Generative AI model.	
British Chronicle	britishchronicle.com			
centralrecord[.]org	centralrecord[.]org			
Chicago Chronicle	chicagochron[.]com	Defunct	Spoof of the Chicago Chronicle, a late 19th-early 20th century newspaper in the United States.	
Chicago Crier	chicagocrier[.]com			
Clear Story News	clearstory[.]news		Accused by the United States federal government of publishing fabricated audio of a conversation between US officials.	
DC Weekly	dcweekly[.]org		Published and spread false claims about Ukraine president Volodymyr Zelenskyy. Accused by researchers of using generative AI for their stories.	
Evening Star				
falconeye.tech	falconeye.tech			
The Flagstaff Post	flagstaffpost[.]com			
franceencolere[.]fr	franceencolere[.]fr		Promoted an impostor site of the Renaissance Party that falsely claimed that the party would pay citizens to vote for them during the first round of the 2024 French legislative election. Many articles were reposted from a website used in Russia's Doppelganger campaign. The Atlantic Council's Digital Forensic Research Lab concluded that the site likely used a large language model to attempt to rewrite articles from French news sources such as Le Parisien, 20 Minutes, Libération, Le Figaro, Le Monde, and La Croix.	
GBGeopolitics	gbgeopolitics.com			
Georgia Gazette				
The Houston Post	houstonpost[.]org		Spoofs the Houston Post. Includes prompts for large language models in some of its articles.	
infosindependants.fr	infosindependants.fr	Defunct		
KBSF-San Francisco News	kbsf-tv.com	Defunct	Spread false claim about Kamala Harris. Imitates a local news TV station. Copied articles from ABC News and CBS News.	
London Crier	londoncrier.co.uk	Defunct		
London Crier	londoncrier.com	Defunct		
LondonChronicleNews	londonchronicle.news			
Miami Chronicle	miamichron[.]com		Falsely claims to have been in existence since 1937, since it was registered in February 2024. The "About" page contains Loren ipsum. Some of the site images have filenames in Russian. According to The New York Times, the site does not have valid contact info. Accused by the United States federal government of publishing fabricated audio of a conversation between US officials.	
New York News Daily	nynewsdaily[.]org		Spoofs New York Daily News.	
Pennsylvania Messenger				
Red State Report				
Right Review				
San Fran Chron	sanfranchron[.]com		Spoofs the San Francisco Chronicle.	
Verite Cachee France	veritecachee[.]fr		Noted by researchers to use Generative AI to produce articles based on French news websites. Some article titles include prompts for large language models. Website name is misspelled, missing accents.	
vidvist.com	vidvist.com			
XposedEm	xposedem[.]com			

=== Portal Kombat / Pravda network ===
The following websites have been linked by researchers to the Pravda network.

Name	Domain	Status	Notes	Sources
abakan-news[.]net	abakan-news[.]net			
adygheya-news[.]net	adygheya-news[.]net			
alchevsk-news[.]ru	alchevsk-news[.]ru			
altay-news[.]net	altay-news[.]net			
amur-news[.]net	amur-news[.]net			
arkhangelsk-news[.]net	arkhangelsk-news[.]net			
astrakhan-news[.]net	astrakhan-news[.]net			
baikal-news[.]net	baikal-news[.]net			
barnaul-news[.]net	barnaul-news[.]net			
bc-news[.]ru	bc-news[.]ru			
belgorod-news[.]net	belgorod-news[.]net			
berdyansk-news[.]ru	berdyansk-news[.]ru			
birobidzhan-news[.]net	birobidzhan-news[.]net			
bryansk-news[.]net	bryansk-news[.]net			
cheb-news[.]net	cheb-news[.]net			
chelyabinsk-news[.]net	chelyabinsk-news[.]net			
cherkassy-news[.]ru	cherkassy-news[.]ru			
cherkessk-news[.]net	cherkessk-news[.]net			
chernigov-news[.]ru	chernigov-news[.]ru			
chernovcy-news[.]ru	chernovcy-news[.]ru			
chita-news[.]net	chita-news[.]net			
chukotka-news[.]net	chukotka-news[.]net			
crimea-news[.]com	crimea-news[.]com			
dagestan-news[.]net	dagestan-news[.]net			
dnepr-news[.]ru	dnepr-news[.]ru			
dneprnews.com[.]ua	dneprnews.com[.]ua			
dneprodzerzhinsk-news[.]ru	dneprodzerzhinsk-news[.]ru			
dnr-news[.]ru	dnr-news[.]ru			
donetsk-news[.]ru	donetsk-news[.]ru			
gazeta.kharkiv[.]ua	gazeta.kharkiv[.]ua			
georgia-news[.]com	georgia-news[.]com			
gorlovka-news[.]ru	gorlovka-news[.]ru			
grozny-news[.]net	grozny-news[.]net			
if-news[.]ru	if-news[.]ru			
ingushetiya-news[.]net	ingushetiya-news[.]net			
irkutsk-news[.]net	irkutsk-news[.]net			
ivanovo-news[.]net	ivanovo-news[.]net			
izhevsk-news[.]net	izhevsk-news[.]net			
kaliningrad-news[.]net	kaliningrad-news[.]net			
kalmykia-news[.]net	kalmykia-news[.]net			
kaluga-news[.]net	kaluga-news[.]net			
kamchatka-news[.]net	kamchatka-news[.]net			
karelia-news[.]net	karelia-news[.]net			
kazan-news[.]net	kazan-news[.]net			
kemerovo-news[.]net	kemerovo-news[.]net			
khabarovsk-news[.]net	khabarovsk-news[.]net			
kherson-news[.]ru	kherson-news[.]ru			
khmelnitskiy-news[.]ru	khmelnitskiy-news[.]ru			
kiev-news.com[.]ua	kiev-news.com[.]ua			
kirov-news[.]net	kirov-news[.]net			
kirovograd-news[.]ru	kirovograd-news[.]ru			
komi-news[.]net	komi-news[.]net			
kostroma-news[.]net	kostroma-news[.]net			
kramatorsk-news[.]ru	kramatorsk-news[.]ru			
krasnodar-news[.]net	krasnodar-news[.]net			
krasnoyarsk-news[.]net	krasnoyarsk-news[.]net			
kremenchug-news[.]ru	kremenchug-news[.]ru			
krivoy-rog-news[.]ru	krivoy-rog-news[.]ru			
kurgan-news[.]net	kurgan-news[.]net			
kursk-news[.]net	kursk-news[.]net			
latvia-news[.]com	latvia-news[.]com			
lenta.donetsk[.]ua	lenta.donetsk[.]ua			
lenta.if[.]ua	lenta.if[.]ua			
lenta.kharkiv[.]ua	lenta.kharkiv[.]ua			
lenta.lviv[.]ua	lenta.lviv[.]ua			
lenta.te[.]ua	lenta.te[.]ua			
lipetsk-news[.]net	lipetsk-news[.]net			
lithuania-news[.]com	lithuania-news[.]com			
lnr-news[.]ru	lnr-news[.]ru			
lugansk-news[.]ru	lugansk-news[.]ru			
lvov-news[.]ru	lvov-news[.]ru			
magadan-news[.]net	magadan-news[.]net			
mariel-news[.]net	mariel-news[.]net			
mariupol-news[.]ru	mariupol-news[.]ru			
melitopol-news[.]ru	melitopol-news[.]ru			
moldova-news[.]com	moldova-news[.]com			
moskva-news[.]com	moskva-news[.]com			
msk-news[.]net	msk-news[.]net			
murmansk-news[.]net	murmansk-news[.]net			
nabchelny-news[.]ru	nabchelny-news[.]ru			
nalchik-news[.]net	nalchik-news[.]net			
nao-news[.]net	nao-news[.]net			
news-armenia[.]com	news-armenia[.]com			
news-balashiha[.]ru	news-balashiha[.]ru			
news-estonia[.]com	news-estonia[.]com			
news-kharkov[.]ru	news-kharkov[.]ru			
news-kiev[.]ru	news-kiev[.]ru			
news-makeevka[.]ru	news-makeevka[.]ru			
news-odessa[.]ru	news-odessa[.]ru			
news-pravda[.]com	news-pravda[.]com			
news-surgut[.]ru	news-surgut[.]ru			
niknews.com[.]ua	niknews.com[.]ua			
nikolaev-news[.]ru	nikolaev-news[.]ru			
nikolaevnews.com[.]ua	nikolaevnews.com[.]ua			
nikopol-news[.]ru	nikopol-news[.]ru			
nk-news[.]ru	nk-news[.]ru			
nn-news[.]net	nn-news[.]net			
norilsk-news[.]ru	norilsk-news[.]ru			
novgorod-news[.]net	novgorod-news[.]net			
novosibirsk-news[.]net	novosibirsk-news[.]net			
novyny.kr[.]ua	novyny.kr[.]ua			
novyny.zt[.]ua	novyny.zt[.]ua			
omsk-news[.]net	omsk-news[.]net			
orel-news[.]net	orel-news[.]net			
orenburg-news[.]net	orenburg-news[.]net			
pavlograd-news[.]ru	pavlograd-news[.]ru			
penza-news[.]net	penza-news[.]net			
perm-news[.]net	perm-news[.]net			
piter-news[.]net	piter-news[.]net			
poltava-news[.]ru	poltava-news[.]ru			
pravda-de[.]com	pravda-de[.]com			
Pravda EN	pravda-en[.]com			
pravda-es[.]com	pravda-es[.]com			
pravda-fr[.]com	pravda-fr[.]com			
pravda-pl[.]com	pravda-pl[.]com			
pravda-nl[.]com	pravda-nl[.]com			
pravda-dk[.]com	pravda-dk[.]com			
pravda-se[.]com	pravda-se[.]com			
pravda-fi[.]com	pravda-fi[.]com			
pravda-ee[.]com	pravda-ee[.]com			
pravda-lt[.]com	pravda-lt[.]com			
pravda-lv[.]com	pravda-lv[.]com			
pravda-cz[.]com	pravda-cz[.]com			
pravda-sk[.]com	pravda-sk[.]com			
pravda-si[.]com	pravda-si[.]com			
pravda-hr[.]com	pravda-hr[.]com			
pravda-hu[.]com	pravda-hu[.]com			
pravda-ro[.]com	pravda-ro[.]com			
pravda-bg[.]com	pravda-bg[.]com			
pravda-gr[.]com	pravda-gr[.]com			
pravda-cy[.]com	pravda-cy[.]com			
pravda-it[.]com	pravda-it[.]com			
pravda-ie[.]com	pravda-ie[.]com			
pravda-pt[.]com	pravda-pt[.]com			
pravda-al[.]com	pravda-al[.]com			
pravda-ba[.]com	pravda-ba[.]com			
pravda-mk[.]com	pravda-mk[.]com			
pravda-md[.]com	pravda-md[.]com			
pravda-rs[.]com	pravda-rs[.]com			
pravda-no[.]com	pravda-no[.]com			
pravda-cf[.]com	pravda-cf[.]com			
pravda-bf[.]com	pravda-bf[.]com			
pravda-ne[.]com	pravda-ne[.]com			
pravda-jp[.]com	pravda-jp[.]com			
pravda-tw[.]com	pravda-tw[.]com			
pravda-ko[.]com	pravda-ko[.]com			
pskov-news[.]net	pskov-news[.]net			
rostov-news[.]net	rostov-news[.]net			
rovno-news[.]ru	rovno-news[.]ru			
ryazan-news[.]net	ryazan-news[.]net			
sakhalin-news[.]net	sakhalin-news[.]net			
samara-news[.]net	samara-news[.]net			
saransk-news[.]net	saransk-news[.]net			
saratov-news[.]net	saratov-news[.]net			
sevastopol-news[.]com	sevastopol-news[.]com			
slavyansk-news[.]ru	slavyansk-news[.]ru			
smolensk-news[.]net	smolensk-news[.]net			
sochi-news[.]net	sochi-news[.]net			
stavropol-news[.]net	stavropol-news[.]net			
sumy-news[.]ru	sumy-news[.]ru			
tagil-news[.]ru	tagil-news[.]ru			
tambov-news[.]net	tambov-news[.]net			
ternopol-news[.]ru	ternopol-news[.]ru			
tiraspol-news[.]ru	tiraspol-news[.]ru			
tolyatti-news[.]net	tolyatti-news[.]net			
tomsk-news[.]net	tomsk-news[.]net			
topnews.ck[.]ua	topnews.ck[.]ua			
topnews.cn[.]ua	topnews.cn[.]ua			
topnews.cv[.]ua	topnews.cv[.]ua			
topnews.kiev[.]ua	topnews.kiev[.]ua			
topnews.km[.]ua	topnews.km[.]ua			
topnews.kr[.]ua	topnews.kr[.]ua			
topnews.ks[.]ua	topnews.ks[.]ua			
topnews.lg[.]ua	topnews.lg[.]ua			
topnews.odessa[.]ua	topnews.odessa[.]ua			
topnews.pl[.]ua	topnews.pl[.]ua			
topnews.rv[.]ua	topnews.rv[.]ua			
topnews.sebastopol[.]ua	topnews.sebastopol[.]ua			
topnews.sumy[.]ua	topnews.sumy[.]ua			
topnews[.]uz[.]ua	topnews[.]uz[.]ua			
topnews.vn[.]ua	topnews.vn[.]ua			
topnews.volyn[.]ua	topnews.volyn[.]ua			
topnews.zp[.]ua	topnews.zp[.]ua			
topnews.zt[.]ua	topnews.zt[.]ua			
tula-news[.]net	tula-news[.]net			
tuva-news[.]net	tuva-news[.]net			
tver-news[.]net	tver-news[.]net			
tyumen-news[.]net	tyumen-news[.]net			
uanews.ck[.]ua	uanews.ck[.]ua			
uanews.cn[.]ua	uanews.cn[.]ua			
uanews.crimea[.]ua	uanews.crimea[.]ua			
uanews.cv[.]ua	uanews.cv[.]ua			
uanews.donetsk[.]ua	uanews.donetsk[.]ua			
uanews.dp[.]ua	uanews.dp[.]ua			
uanews.if[.]ua	uanews.if[.]ua			
uanews.kharkiv[.]ua	uanews.kharkiv[.]ua			
uanews.km[.]ua	uanews.km[.]ua			
uanews.kr[.]ua	uanews.kr[.]ua			
uanews.ks[.]ua	uanews.ks[.]ua			
uanews.lg[.]ua	uanews.lg[.]ua			
uanews.lviv[.]ua	uanews.lviv[.]ua			
uanews.odessa[.]ua	uanews.odessa[.]ua			
uanews.pl[.]ua	uanews.pl[.]ua			
uanews.rv[.]ua	uanews.rv[.]ua			
uanews.sumy[.]ua	uanews.sumy[.]ua			
uanews.te[.]ua	uanews.te[.]ua			
uanews.uz[.]ua	uanews.uz[.]ua			
uanews.vn[.]ua	uanews.vn[.]ua			
uanews.volyn[.]ua	uanews.volyn[.]ua			
uanews.zp[.]ua	uanews.zp[.]ua			
uanews.zt[.]ua	uanews.zt[.]ua			
udmurt-news[.]net	udmurt-news[.]net			
ufa-news[.]net	ufa-news[.]net			
ugra-news[.]net	ugra-news[.]net			
ulyanovsk-news[.]net	ulyanovsk-news[.]net			
ural-news[.]net	ural-news[.]net			
uzhgorod-news[.]ru	uzhgorod-news[.]ru			
vin-news[.]ru	vin-news[.]ru			
vladikavkaz-news[.]net	vladikavkaz-news[.]net			
vladimir-news[.]net	vladimir-news[.]net			
vladivostok-news[.]net	vladivostok-news[.]net			
volgograd-news[.]net	volgograd-news[.]net			
vologda-news[.]net	vologda-news[.]net			
volyn-news[.]ru	volyn-news[.]ru			
volzhskiy-news[.]ru	volzhskiy-news[.]ru			
voronezh-news[.]net	voronezh-news[.]net			
yakutsk-news[.]net	yakutsk-news[.]net			
yamal-news[.]net	yamal-news[.]net			
yaroslavl-news[.]net	yaroslavl-news[.]net			
zhitomir-news[.]ru	zhitomir-news[.]ru			
zp-news[.]ru	zp-news[.]ru			

=== RT ===
Name	Domain	Status	Notes	Sources
actualidad-rt[.]com	actualidad-rt[.]com		Alternative domain for RT, created after the Russo-Ukrainian War in 2022 to circumvent the broadcast ban in the European Union.	
Africa-rt.com	africa-rt.com		Domain for RT, targeting French-speakers in African countries.	
esrt[.]press	esrt[.]press		Alternative domain for RT, created after the Russo-Ukrainian War in 2022 to circumvent the broadcast ban in the European Union.	
estr[.]online	estr[.]online		Alternative domain for RT, created after the Russo-Ukrainian War in 2022 to circumvent the broadcast ban in the European Union.	
In the Now	inthenow[.]media		Originally a show on RT that became its own project in 2016. Its content was reposted on RT, and one of its employees also worked at Redfish. Owned by Maffick. Noted by researchers to primarily target younger and left-learning audiences and aim to worsen political divisions in the United States. Described by researchers as using "overt propaganda strategies" in its coverage of the Black Lives Matter protests of 2020.	
Redfish	redfish[.]media		Staffed by Lizzie Phelan, who previously worked for RT and Press TV. At least four other correspondents had previously worked for Russian state media. Presents itself as a "grassroots" and left-wing media startup. Its content is reposted on RT. Accused by Vice of being a front organization to spread propaganda from the Russian government. Described by propaganda researchers as having a sophisticated level of production, lacking direct display of ties to Russia, and reaching its audience's feelings of indignation at perceived hypocrisy in its use of whataboutism. Noted by researchers to primarily target younger and left-learning audiences and aim to worsen political divisions in the United States. Described by researchers as using "overt propaganda strategies" in its coverage of the Black Lives Matter protests of 2020.	
RT	rt.com		Funded by the Russian federal government. Accused by the Global Disinformation Index of spreading disinformation on 5G, COVID-19 and the 2020 US presidential election. Identified by the Center for Countering Digital Hate as a major distributor of climate change denialism.	
swentr[.]site	swentr.site		English-language mirror of RT, launched to bypass European Union sanctions after the 2022 Russian invasion of Ukraine. Identified by investigators and journalists as a rebranded outlet distributing sanctioned RT content in Europe.	
Ruptly	ruptly[.]tv		Subsidiary of RT. Noted by researchers to primarily target younger and left-learning audiences and aim to worsen political divisions in the United States. Described by researchers as using "overt propaganda strategies" in its coverage of the Black Lives Matter protests of 2020.	
Rt-afrique.com	rt-afrique.com		Domain for RT, targeting French-speakers in African countries.	
Rtafrica.media	rtafrica.media		Domain for RT, targeting French-speakers in African countries.	
Rtafrique.online	rtafrique.online		Domain for RT, targeting French-speakers in African countries.	

=== Stop News ===
Name	Domain	Status	Notes	Sources
britishtalks.com	britishtalks.com			
euronewstop.co.uk	euronewstop.co.uk			
Newstop.africa	Newstop.africa			
Britishattitudes.com	Britishattitudes.com			

=== Other Campaigns ===
Name	Domain	Status	Notes	Sources
Albuquerque Breaking News			Copied and republished content from RT.	
xn--aljaeera-4t0d[.]net	xn--aljaeera-4t0d[.]net		Spoofing of Al Jazeera. Likely part of an active measures campaign by the Russian government in 2017. Also part of Endless Mayfly, an Iran-affiliated disinformation campaign.	
theatlatnic[.]com	theatlatnic[.]com		Spoofing of The Atlantic. Likely part of an active measures campaign by the Russian government in 2017. Also part of Endless Mayfly, an Iran-affiliated disinformation campaign.	
Channel3 Now	channel3now.com	Defunct	Registered in Lithuania in 2023. Accused by investigative journalists and disinformation researchers of being linked to Russia and of originating the claim that falsely identified the perpetrator of the 2024 Southport stabbing, leading to the 2024 United Kingdom riots. Noted by The Guardian and The Telegraph of potentially using Generative AI in some of its stories. A subsequent BBC investigation in August 2024 did not find evidence of ties to the Russian state, and described the site as "a commercial operation attempting to aggregate crime news while making money on social media."	
Channel3 Now	fox3now.com	Defunct		
Channel3 Now	fox5now.com	Defunct		
Channel3 Now	fox7now.com	Defunct		
EurAsia Daily	eadaily.com		EADaily (Eurasia Daily) is a Russian-language news website that focuses on politics, economics, and international relations, particularly in the post-Soviet space. The website was founded in 2015 and positions itself as a provider of analytical journalism with a strong focus on Eurasian geopolitical issues. EADaily exhibits a strong pro-Russian, nationalist, and right-leaning bias, particularly in its coverage of international affairs. Its reporting often portrays Russia as a stabilizing force in global politics while casting Western nations, especially the United States, NATO, and the European Union, as aggressive or destabilizing actors. Coverage of conflicts involving Russia, such as the war in Ukraine, tends to present Ukrainian forces negatively while amplifying Russian military successes.	
xn--theguardan-4ub[.]com	xn--theguardan-4ub[.]com		Spoofing of The Guardian that uses an IDN homograph attack in which the "i" in the "guardian" is replaced by the Turkish character "ı". Contains fabricated quotes from John Scarlett that suggest CIA and MI6 involvement in the Rose Revolution to weaken Russia. Likely part of an active measures campaign by the Russian government in 2017. Also part of Endless Mayfly, an Iran-affiliated disinformation campaign.	
xn--haarez-m17b[.]com	xn--haarez-m17b[.]com		Spoofing of Haaretz. Likely part of an active measures campaign by the Russian government in 2017. Also part of Endless Mayfly, an Iran-affiliated disinformation campaign.	
lesoir[.]info	lesoir[.]info		Spoof of Le Soir. Part of Endless Mayfly, an Iran-affiliated disinformation campaign. Also used to spread a false claim about Emmanuel Macron's campaign being funded by Saudi Arabia during the 2017 French Presidential Election.	
Little Rock AR News			Copied and republished content from RT.	
Media Alternatif	mediaalternatif.fr		Includes prompts for large language models in some of its articles. Cites an NGO founded by Yevgeny Prigozhin as a source for a unverified claim that Ukrainian children were kidnapped by a foundation run by Olena Zelenska. Lists a fictitious journalist as a writer on its site. The owner of the website domain, Host Master, is a company in Cyprus that was previously convicted of fraud for selling domain names that were very similar to Google and the French company.	
NewsFront	news-front[.]info		Funded by the FSB.	
Observateur Continental	ObservateurContinental[.]fr		Spread disinformation about COVID-19, including the false claim that COVID-19 is a bioweapon. Linked to Russian news agency InfoRos, which in turn is linked with the GRU.	
Oneworld.press	Oneworld[.]press		Russian troll farm working to elect Donald Trump and pushing fake pandemic information. Linked to Russian news agency InfoRos, which in turn is linked with the GRU.	
pagesix[.]now	pagesix[.]now		Spoofs Page Six.	
Patriot Pioneer	patrioticpioneer.com			
Peace Data	peacedata[.]net		A website that purports to be an independent left-wing news outlet, linked to Russian state actors.	
Seattle Tribune	seattle-tribune.com		Impersonates the Seattle Tribune, a defunct 20th century newspaper.	
SouthFront	southfront[.]org		Accused by independent researchers of being sponsored by the Russian government.	
State Stage	statestage.org			
Veterans News Now	veteransnewsnow[.]com		Accused by independent researchers of being sponsored by the Russian government.	
Veterans Today	veteranstoday[.]com		Accused by independent researchers of being sponsored by the Russian government.	

== See also ==
- List of political disinformation website campaigns
