= Speaking Into The Air =

1999 book by John Durham Peters

Speaking into the Air: A History of the Idea of Communication
- Author: John Durham Peters
- Language: English
- Genre: Non-fiction
- Publication date: 1999

Speaking into the Air: A History of the Idea of Communication, written by American scholar John Durham Peters, is a major work in communication studies and the author's first book.This book discusses the history of the concept of communication across disciplines and from multiple perspectives. This book won the National Communication Association Award in 2000.

== Themes ==
Speaking into the Air: A History of the Idea of Communication studies communication failure. It contains five phrases of history of the idea of Communication: Plato's eros, The Bible's one-way dissemination, religious angel communication in Middle Ages, spiritual communication in modern philosophy, and the communication idea in modern communication theory. It also involves the subject machines, animals and aliens as horizons of incommunicability.

== See also ==
John Durham Peters
