= The Lolita Effect =

Book by Meenakshi Gigi Durham

- Author: Meenakshi Gigi Durham
- Language: English
- Published: 286 pages
- Publisher: The Overlook Press
- Publication place: United States
- Media type: Print, ebook
- ISBN: 1590200632

The Lolita Effect: The Media Sexualization of Young Girls and What We Can Do About It is a 2008 book by Meenakshi Gigi Durham. The book's title refers to a term coined by Durham, the Lolita effect, which refers to the theory that media sexualization hinders the healthy development of pre-adolescent and adolescent girls. Its title is derived from Vladimir Nabokov's novel Lolita, where a middle-aged professor becomes obsessed with the titular 12-year-old girl. The term Lolita effect has since come to refer to the blame that can be put on young females for their part in abuse or harassment that they face, similar to the phrases "slut-shaming" or "victim-blaming".

The book was first published by The Overlook Press.

== Synopsis ==
In the preface of her book, Durham claims that her purpose for the book was to challenge the binaries that have formed surrounding female sexuality, especially for pre-adolescent and adolescent girls. She explains that "underage" girls are confined to play either a role as a slut or as asexual: they either express their own sexuality and get judged as indecent for it, or they are thought to have no sexuality or sexual inclinations at this age at all. Durham claims that she wanted her book to present female sexuality, even at a young age, as healthy, normal, and even an important part of development into adulthood.

The book's main focus states that media advertisement manipulates the narrative of girls exploring their sexuality and either exploits them in dangerous ways, or judges them as deviant or slutty. Durham condemns how sexuality is portrayed in the public sphere, especially in regards to celebrities, as she believes it must be done in private for healthy development. Her book is primarily geared towards parents and teachers to encourage the adults to teach young girls how to understand and explore their sexuality in a safe way for their protection and to protect against unwanted pregnancy and sexually transmitted infections. She claims to also be speaking to young girls, teaching them about the way the media is influencing their lives.

== Reception of book and term ==
Reviews of the book are generally positive, with reviewers opining that the book will be helpful for parents and counselors, in contrast critics feel that it is too much focused on the adults of the situation and less on the culture behind the issue.

In her essay, "Lolita Is in the Eye of the Beholder", Margaret McGladrey discusses the use of the term and comments that the most visible books about the Lolita effect approach the topic from the viewpoint of an adult and do not include that of pre-adolescent girls. She criticizes this approach, stating that "Projecting presumptions about the effects of media sexualization and objectification on adult women onto girls’ lived experiences both underrates the importance of the broad array of meanings that girls ascribe to the imagery of idealized femininity and inappropriately equates a specific type of objectification (sexualization) with all manners of treating the body as an object to control and manage." McGladrey also states that the "key determinant of the gender scripts that girls employ in fashioning their subjectivities may be their perceived audience for their performances of femininity, which for preadolescent girls includes not only boys, but also their female peers."

Jennifer Ruark was mixed on the book and term, criticizing Durham for being vague about what constituted a healthy sexuality and stating that "Occasionally, Durham goes too far in marshalling her evidence", while also commenting that the book "offers dozens of helpful, specific ideas for rendering it less potent".
