= Kenneth Cmiel =

American historian (1954–2006)

Kenneth J. Cmiel (August 31, 1954 – February 4, 2006) was an American academic and historian specializing in the history of human rights at the University of Iowa. He was a professor of history there, as well as the director of the university's Center for Human Rights.

He is the son of Henry and Jean (née Gasiorek) Cmiel. In 1980 he married Anne Duggan with whom he had three children. He graduated from Brother Rice High School, Chicago in 1972. He died in 2006 from a previously undiagnosed brain tumor.

He received his PhD at the University of Chicago under the direction of Neil Harris. He has published two books: Democratic Eloquence: The Fight over Popular Speech in Nineteenth-Century America (1990), which won the Allan Nevins Prize from the Society of American Historians, and A Home of Another Kind: One Chicago Orphanage and the Tangle of Child Welfare (1995). At the time of his death, he was in the process of writing a third book, to cover the origins of the Universal Declaration of Human Rights.

In 2020, the University of Chicago Press published Promiscuous Knowledge: Information, Image, and Other Truth Games in History, a book for which Cmiel had left behind an outline at the time of his death, and which his colleague and friend John Durham Peters finished. Cmiel and Peters are listed as co-authors of the book.
