= Meenakshi Gigi Durham =

Indian writer and professor of communication studies

Academic background
- Thesis: Is it all in the telling?: A study of the role of text schemas and schematic text structures in the recall and comprehension of printed news stories (1990)

Academic work
- Institutions: University of Iowa College of Liberal Arts and Sciences
- Main interests: Media and the politics of the body
- Website: https://clas.uiowa.edu/sjmc/people/meenakshi-gigi-durham

Meenakshi Gigi Durham is an Indian American professor of feminist media studies and a writer.

== Life ==
Durham was born in Mangalore, India but moved to the United States and then Canada at a young age.

She was previously a Faculty Fellow in the Office of the Vice President for Research & Economic Development. She was also the Associate Faculty Director of the Obermann Center for Advanced Studies, an Associate Dean in the College of Liberal Arts & Sciences, and Faculty Ombudsperson for the university. She is currently a full professor and CLAS Collegiate Scholar at the University of Iowa, with an appointment in School of Journalism and Mass Communication; she also holds appointments in the Department of Gender, Women's and Sexuality Studies and the Department of English.

Durham sits on the editorial boards of the Feminist Media Studies, Critical Studies in Media Communication, Communication, Culture & Critique and Sexualization, Media, and Society. From 2007-2016, she was executive editor of the Journal of Communication Inquiry.

She is widely recognized for her scholarship, and in addition to her numerous publications and awards, her work has been featured in the documentaries Miss Representation and Pretty Baby. She has also published short stories and essays.

== Selected publications ==
Durham, Meenakshi Gigi (2021). MeToo : the impact of rape culture in the media. Cambridge, UK. ISBN 978-1-5095-4778-4. OCLC 1247663066.

Durham, Meenakshi Gigi (2016). Technosex : precarious corporealities, mediated sexualities, and the ethics of embodied technics. London. ISBN 978-3-319-28142-1. OCLC 956730966.

Durham, M. Gigi (2009). The Lolita Effect: The Media Sexualization of Young Girls and What We Can Do About It. Abrams. ISBN 978-1-59020-594-5.
