= EurAsia Daily =

Russian state-controlled propaganda news outlet

- Available in: Russian, English
- Founded: 10 September 2015; 11 years ago
- Headquarters: Moscow
- Country of origin: Russia
- Website: Official website

EurAsia Daily (abbreviated EADaily) is a Russian state-controlled news outlet founded in 2015. EADaily has been described in Ukrainian, Baltic, Finnish, Belarusian, and Georgian media as pro-Kremlin, as well as publishing false and unreliable information.

== History ==
EurAsia Daily was founded in 2015 for "objective coverage of political and socio-economic processes on the Eurasian continent". The media registration certificate was issued by Roskomnadzor on 10 September 2015.

In December 2016, three local publicists who wrote articles under pseudonyms for the Russian publications Regnum, as well as Lenta.ru and EADaily Yury Pavlovets, Dzmitry Alimkin and Siarhei Shiptenko were arrested in the Republic of Belarus on charges of inciting ethnic hatred. The texts of the detainees in the so-called "case of publicists", or "Regnum case", spoke a lot about the oppression of Russians in Belarus, about the "artificiality of the Belarusian identity", criticized the cooperation of the Belarusian authorities with the "Ukrainian junta". As far as can be understood, the materials that formed the basis of the accusation referred to the "futility" of the Belarusian language and suggested that a nationalist uprising might be in preparation in Belarus and that it might follow the example of Ukraine, where a public protest in 2013-2014 ousted the government. In 2017, the journalists were charged under the article of the Belarusian Criminal Code "incitement of discord committed by a group of persons" and sentenced to 5 years in prison with a suspended sentence. The authors' materials were published under the pseudonyms of Mikalai Radau, Pavel Yurintsev, Alla Bron and Artur Grigoriev. All three authors spent 14 months in pre-trial detention.

In 2021, EADaily reporters, together with reporters from Sputnik and RusDnepr agencies, covered a small rally in support of Lithuanian politician Algirdas Paleckis, accused of spying for Russia.

In March 2022, EADaily interviewed a Serbian sniper who participated in the Russian-Ukrainian war in 2014 on the side of pro-Russian separatists in Donbas.

== Activity ==
The news outlet maintains a website with articles, interviews and reports.

== Criticism ==
In 2016, there was a conflict with Russian Academy of Sciences academician Alexei Arbatov over issues of Russian foreign policy and security.

In 2017, RFE/RL characterized EurAsia Daily as "long known for its militant pro-Kremlin orientation", giving low marks to both the quality of the publication about Azerbaijan's politics and its one-sidedness. In 2018, RFE/RL alleged that EADaily conducted a false fact-checking of Russia Today's statements about chemical attacks in Syria.

Also according to the results of the investigation conducted in 2018 by the Belarusian Republican Expert Commission, the materials published on the websites Regnum, Lenta.ru and EADaily by their authors questioned the sovereignty of Belarus, the texts contained insulting statements against the Belarusian people, their history, language and culture.

Since 2019, the publication, together with the Sputnik agency, has been actively promoting conspiracy theories around the COVID-2019 epidemic; also, an unverified story about a man allegedly living in a bear den for a month received wide media coverage.

In the same year, Jamestown Foundation expert Armen Grigoryan mentioned EADaily among the publications promoting conspiracy theories about businessman George Soros' interests in the change of power in Armenia.

In 2020, the State Military Industry Committee of Belarus accused the publication of forgery and an attempt to stir up a scandal about Belarus' arms supplies to the U.S.: according to their statement, "Eurasia Daily's information dump is like an attempt to ‘find a black cat in a dark room, especially when it is not there’".

Also in 2020 it was claimed that the publication was involved in supporting the pro-Kremlin opposition in the Georgian elections and in promoting conspiracy theories about biological weapons testing in Georgia. In 2020-2021 it was reported that EADaily was involved in inciting the Armenian-Azerbaijani conflict in Nagorno-Karabakh.

In 2021, EADaily promoted a narrative about the alleged active support of Romanian politician Maia Sandu by far-right trade unions, and tried to link her activities to fascism and support for war criminal Marshal Ion Antonescu, based on a single indiscreet statement.

In 2022, Delphi characterized EADaily as a pro-Kremlin publication; they also noted that the publication was not blocked in the European Union at the time, despite a similar propaganda editorial policy to Sputnik.

Also in 2022, EurAsia Daily reprinted a false report by Readovka about the burning of the house of a German girl sheltering Ukrainian refugees and spread a rumor about the murder of a Polish citizen by Ukrainian migrants. At the same time, the publication promoted false statements about the alleged canonization of Stepan Bandera by the Ukrainian Orthodox Church – Kyiv Patriarchate; later the publication seriously condemned joking statements about the annexation of Kaliningrad Oblast by the Czech Republic (which emerged against the background of falsifying the results of an internationally unrecognized "referendum" held to justify Russia's annexation of Ukraine's occupied territories) and supported the narrative about the involvement of the US and Ukrainian authorities in the protests in Dagestan.

== Restrictions ==
On 24 February 2025, against the backdrop of the Russian invasion of Ukraine, the EU revoked the publication's broadcasting license, placing it on the list of media outlets under the permanent control of the Russian leadership. According to the EU, these publications "played an important role in promoting and supporting Russia's war of aggression against Ukraine, as well as in destabilising its neighbouring countries, the EU and its member states".
