= John Durham Peters =

American academic (born 1958)

John Durham Peters (born 1958) is the María Rosa Menocal Professor of English and of Film & Media Studies at Yale University. A media historian and social theorist, he has authored a number of noted scholarly works. His first book, Speaking into the Air: A History of the Idea of Communication, traces out broad historical, philosophical, religious, cultural, legal, and technological contexts for the study of communication. His second book Courting the Abyss: Free Speech and the Liberal Tradition updates the philosophy of free expression with a history of liberal thought since Paul of Tarsus. His signal work of media philosophy The Marvelous Clouds: Toward a Philosophy of Elemental Media radically rethinks how media are environments and environments are also media. His most recent book, coauthored with the late Kenneth Cmiel, Promiscuous Knowledge offers a genealogy of the information age from its earliest origins, focusing on the nineteenth and twentieth centuries into the present moment. He has advised dozens of dissertations and published hundreds of articles and chapters. Peters has held fellowships with the National Endowment for the Humanities, the Fulbright Foundation, and the Leverhulme Trust, among others.

Peters grew up in Brookline, Massachusetts, pursued studies at Brigham Young University in Provo, Utah, and graduated with a BA in English from the University of Utah, where he also earned his MA in speech communication. He received a PhD in communication theory and research from Stanford University in 1986 before accepting a faculty appointment at the University of Iowa. After teaching there for thirty years, he accepted a position at Yale University in 2017.

== Dialogue and dissemination ==
In chapter one of Speaking Into the Air, Peters (1999) compares two forms of communication: dialogue and dissemination. Even though dialogue tends to be viewed as the better means of communication, Peters believes that it can be cruel and destructive. Dissemination is fair because, unlike dialogue, it does not force listeners to understand and reciprocate to the speaker. The lack of interaction provided by dissemination leaves the audience free to interpret meanings themselves. Peters explains that communication can be achieved even if it is one way.

== Selected works ==
- Promiscuous Knowledge: Information, Image, and Other Truth Games in History (2021) coauthored with Kenneth Cmiel
- The Marvelous Clouds: Toward a Philosophy of Elemental Media (2015)
- Courting the Abyss: Free Speech and the Liberal Tradition (2005)
- Canonic Texts in Media Research: Are There Any? Should There Be? How About These? With co-editors Elihu Katz, Tamar Liebes, and Avril Orloff (2003)
- Mass Communication and American Social Thought: Key Texts, 1919-1968. With Peter Simonson (2004).
- Speaking into the Air: A History of the Idea of Communication (1999) - Excerpt about the Dead Letters Office
- “‘The Marketplace of Ideas’: A History of the Concept.” Toward a Political Economy of Culture: Capitalism and Communication in the Twenty-First Century. Eds. Andrew Calabrese and Colin Sparks. Boulder: Rowman and Littlefield, 2004. 65-82.
- “Space, Time, and Communication Theory.” Canadian Journal of Communication 28 (2003): 397–411.
- “Witnessing.” Media, Culture and Society, 23.6 (2001): 707–724.
- “Public Journalism and Democratic Theory: Four Challenges.” The Idea of Public Journalism. Ed. Theodore L. Glasser. New York: Guilford Press, 1999. 99–117.
- “Distrust of Representation: Habermas on the Public Sphere.” Media, Culture and Society 14.3 (1993): 441–471.
- “Institutional Sources of Intellectual Poverty in Communication Research.” Communication Research 13.4 (1986): 527-59.
