= Dissemination =

Word in the English Language

To disseminate (from lat. disseminare "scattering seeds"), in the field of communication, is to broadcast a message to the public without direct feedback from the audience.

== Meaning ==
Dissemination takes on the theory of the traditional view of communication, which involves a sender and receiver. The traditional communication viewpoint is broken down into a sender sending information, and receiver collecting the information processing it and sending information back, like a telephone line.

With dissemination, only half of this communication model theory is applied. The information is sent out and received, but no reply is given. The message carrier sends out information, not to one individual, but many in a broadcasting system. An example of this transmission of information is in fields of advertising, public announcements and speeches. Another way to look at dissemination is that of which it derives from the Latin roots, the scattering of seeds. These seeds are metaphors for voice or words: to spread voice, words, and opinion to an audience.

In a scientific context, dissemination is defined as making projects results available to the scientific community, policy makers and industry – using scientific language prioritizing accuracy. In terms of content, it covers the results of the research project, happens only when results are available and targets a specialist audience in order to enable take-up and use of results. Dissemination of research findings is becoming more important for scientists, since journals start to encourage them to invest extra effort in reaching wider audiences.

== Usage ==
Dissemination can be powerful when adding rhetoric or other forms of persuasiveness to the speech. According to John Durham Peters, who wrote Communication as Dissemination, "making a public offering is perhaps the most basic of all communicative acts, but once the seeds are cast, their harvest is never assured... The metaphor of dissemination points to the contingency of all words and deeds, their uncertain consequences, and their governance by probabilities rather than certainties." In other words, dissemination of words to multiple people can take on multiple meanings to each individual depending on the experience, the attitude, the knowledge, the race or even the gender of the listener. All of these aspects can distort the message that the sender is disseminating towards the public. Depending on the circumstances, the surroundings and the environment the listener is receiving this message in can also have an effect on the outcome of the meaning of the message received. This interference is also known as "noise" in the traditional model of communication theory. Noise can distort the original meaning of a message.

Furthermore, John Durham Peters explains that "broadcasting information to an open ended destination is a feature of all speech. The metaphor of dissemination directs our attention to those vast continents of signification that are not directly interactive." Dissemination basically sends information to an audience, without direct contact to the receiver, and without a direct response or clarification method that a conversation or dialogue would have.

Dissemination plays a crucial role especially in public-funded research, where society, also representing taxpayers funding the research, is asking to see the results of the projects being published and shared with the scientific community. Therefore, public authorities ask organizations executing the research projects to develop and implement a dissemination plan that contributes to the publication of research activities and results. Thus, the funds invested in research flows back to society in terms of knowledge as the publications have to be openly accessible according to the grant agreement.

In policy development, mainstreaming is seen as going a step further than dissemination, in that it tries to embed change in policy and practice, rather than just publishing information.

== See also ==
- Jacques Derrida
