= Asian News International v. Wikimedia Foundation =

Delhi High Court civil defamation case

- Emblem of India
- Court: Delhi High Court
- Full case name: ANI Media Pvt. Ltd. v Wikimedia Foundation Inc & Ors.

Court membership
- Judges sitting: Navin Chawla; Manmohan Malhotra; Tushar Rao Gedela; Jyoti Singh; Abhay Shreeniwas Oka; Ujjal Bhuyan

Keywords
- Civil defamation

Asian News International v. Wikimedia Foundation (CS(OS) 524/2024) is an ongoing civil defamation case in India.

ANI Media Private Limited, the parent company of news agency Asian News International (ANI), filed a ₹2 crore (approximately US$240,000) defamation suit against the Wikimedia Foundation (WMF) in 2024 over the description of ANI in the English Wikipedia article about the news agency.

A judge in the case warned that the court could order the government of India to block Wikipedia in the country. Critics have characterised the judge's order directing WMF to release the identities of the editors who made the edits as censorship and a threat to the flow of information.

Following a Delhi High Court warning in October 2024 that the article may violate sub judice rules and a subsequent takedown order, the WMF suspended access to the English Wikipedia article "Asian News International vs. Wikimedia Foundation", (Note: The article title used "vs." before being moved to the title (as of February 2026) with "v." in November 2025.) blocking it from view for both readers and editors of the online encyclopedia. Access was restored in May 2025 after a WMF appeal and a Supreme Court decision in its favour.

== Background ==
The Wikimedia Foundation (WMF) is the nonprofit organisation that supports Wikipedia, a free online encyclopedia in multiple languages, and multiple other similar projects. Each project is independent and largely self-governed; the WMF exerts limited authority over any project, and typically remains uninvolved with content policy. The presence of Wikipedia in India includes Wikipedia's interaction with India's media environment, the people who edit Wikipedia, and Wikipedia's popularity among readers.

Wikipedia is created and maintained completely by volunteer "editors", a term for anyone who contributes to an article. Hundreds of thousands of such editors exist worldwide, and most can make changes to most articles on the website. A smaller number of editors make enough edits that they are allowed to edit nearly any article. Editors are pseudonymous, except those who voluntarily disclose their identities. Wikipedia articles generally are protected if the article is experiencing a high level of vandalism or an edit war, a series of back-and-forth reversions between two or more versions by two or more editors. In 2020, the article about news agency Asian News International was edited to include content from new sources discussing the agency's record, and an edit war ensued—involving new editors making the same changes to remove the new additions—and the article was eventually protected.

In India, a defamation case can be filed under either criminal law or civil law, or both. According to the Constitution of India, the fundamental right to free speech (Article 19) is subject to "reasonable restrictions". The Safe Harbour clause of Information Technology Act (IT Act), 2000, comparable to Section 230 of Communications Act of 1934 in the United States, exempts online platforms from any legal liability for third-party content generated by its users and hosted by the platform, subject to several conditions. In February 2021, the incumbent Bharatiya Janata Party (BJP) government introduced amendments to the IT Act, imposing stricter obligations on intermediaries, including requiring them to proactively monitor content for illegal or harmful activity.

== Court case ==
=== Defamation suit ===
The case was filed in July 2024 before Justice Navin Chawla in the Delhi High Court as ANI Media Pvt. Ltd. v Wikimedia Foundation Inc & Ors. At the time of the suit's filing, the Wikipedia article about Asian News International (ANI) said the news agency had "been accused of having served as a propaganda tool for the incumbent central government, distributing materials from a vast network of fake news websites, and misreporting events on multiple occasions".

The filing accused Wikipedia of publishing "false and defamatory content with the malicious intent of tarnishing the news agency's reputation, and aimed to discredit its goodwill". It also complained that Wikipedia had "closed" the article about ANI for editing except by Wikipedia's "own editors", citing this as evidence of defamation with malicious intent and evidence that WMF was using its "officials" to "actively participate" in controlling content.

ANI asked for ₹2 crore (approximately US$240,000) in damages and an injunction against Wikipedia "making, publishing, or circulating allegedly false, misleading, and defamatory content against ANI". It also argued that Wikipedia is a significant social media "intermediary" within the definition of Information Technology Act (IT Act), 2000, and must therefore comply with the requirements of the Act, including taking down any content that the government or its agencies deem violative, or be personally liable for content published under its platform.

=== Defamation suit proceedings ===
Chawla issued a summons to WMF and set a hearing date of 20 August 2024. On 20 August, Chawla ordered WMF to disclose identifying details of three editors who had worked on the Wikipedia article about ANI—also defendants in the lawsuit—within two weeks, so that ANI can pursue legal action against them as individuals.

On 5 September 2024, ANI asked the court to hold WMF in contempt when the identifying details were not released. Chawla complied and warned WMF that the court could order the government of India to block Wikipedia in the country, saying: "We will not take it any more. If you don't like India, please don't work in India... We will close your business transactions here." He further ordered that an "authorised representative" of WMF appear in person at the next hearing, which was scheduled for 25 October 2024. In response, Wikimedia emphasised that the information in the article was supported by multiple reliable secondary sources and their delay stemmed from being based in a foreign country.

Days later, the WMF appealed Chawla's order, petitioning that the Court must find the accusation of defamation to be prima facie true before asking for disclosure. On 14 October, a bench comprising justices Manmohan Malhotra and Tushar Rao Gedela heard the appeal; they said that Wikipedia's portrayal of ANI was potentially defamatory and therefore must be defended by the editors in question. They also called Wikipedia's refusal to divulge the identifying details "extremely disturbing" and warned that WMF would lose its safe harbour protection under the IT Act if it chose to defend the allegations of defamation.

On 28 October, the Wikimedia Foundation agreed to the court's request to disclose the identifying information of online users involved in editing the ANI page. An arrangement was reached in the High Court on 11 November to have the Foundation serving the summons papers to the involved users as an intermediary while disclosing the email identities of the users under sealed cover to the judge, which would still protect the individuals' privacy for the time being.

On 2 April 2025, the Delhi High Court granted the interim injunction in favour of ANI and ordered the Wikimedia Foundation to remove the allegedly defamatory content, remove the article's protected status, and "restrain the platform's users and administrators from publishing anything defamatory against the news agency". An appeal of the order was denied on 8 April by a division bench, though it slightly revised the order. The Foundation subsequently filed an appeal before the Supreme Court of India over the 2 April and 8 April orders. The Supreme Court heard the case on 17 April, and decided to set aside the 2 April and 8 April orders as they were "broadly worded" and could not be implemented. In the same decision, ANI was granted a relief to refile the interim application before a single-judge back in the high court. On 8 May, the Foundation withdrew its appeal with the division bench after the Supreme Court's decision.

On 9 May 2025, after ANI had filed a fresh application for interim relief pursuant to the Supreme Court order, the second proceeding was heard in front of Justice Jyoti Singh. The case was adjourned to be heard on 7 July after WMF's senior advocate Akhil Sibal requested more time. The next hearing is on 4 November 2026.

== Lawsuit article's takedown proceedings ==
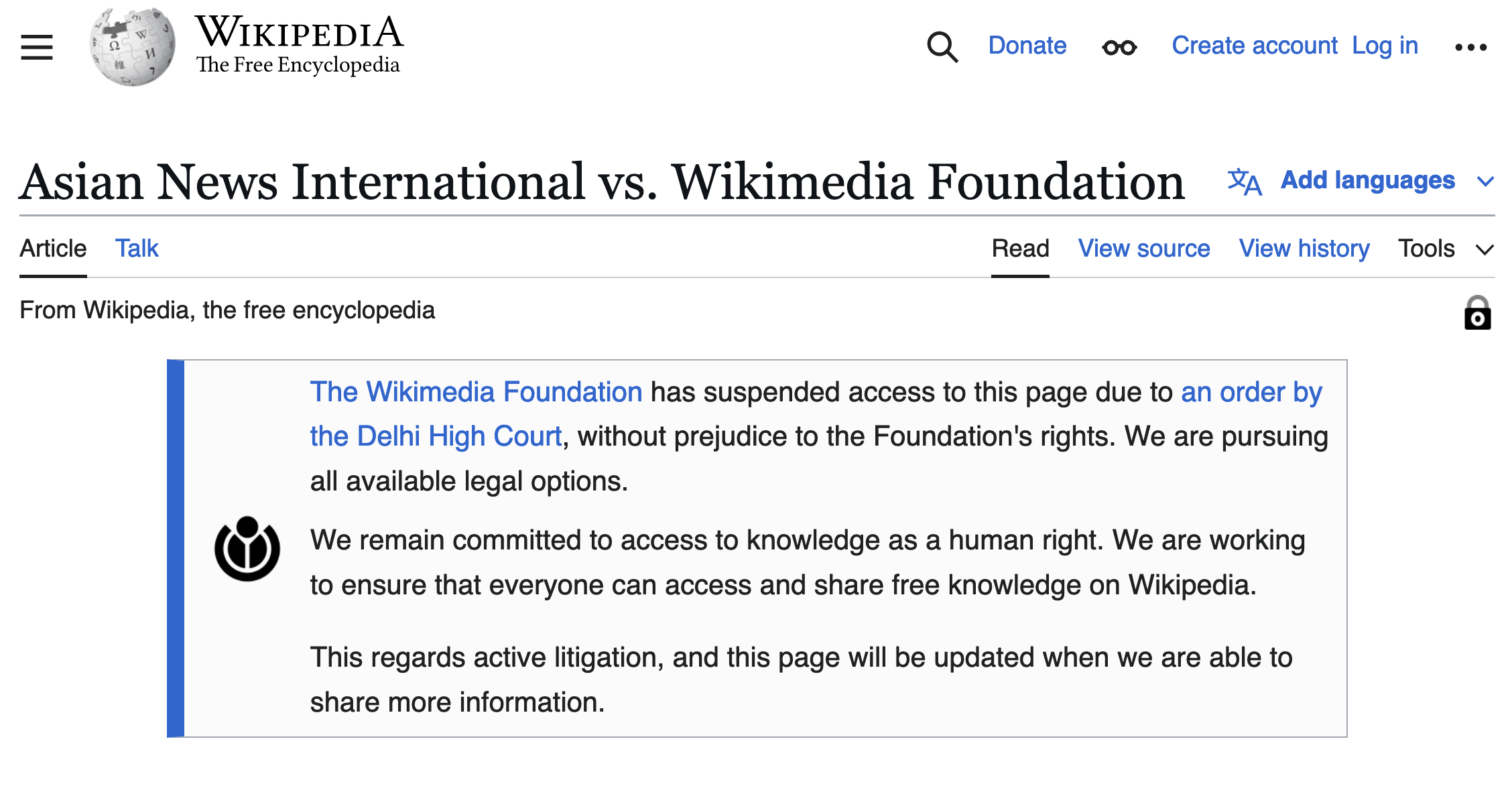
Message displayed to users on the English Wikipedia when access to the lawsuit article was suspended

On 14 October 2024, the judges further objected to the creation of the Wikipedia article "Asian News International vs. Wikimedia Foundation", about the defamation case, alleging interference with "a sub-judice matter" and taking particular umbrage at the article's mention of criticism of Chawla's order. Later that week, the court passed an order directing all "pages on Wikipedia pertaining to the single judge [Chawla] as well as discussion of the observations of division bench [Manmohan and Gedela]" to be "taken down or deleted within 36 hours". On 18 October, ANI asked the court to seek contempt proceedings against the WMF for not taking down the article since the 36-hour deadline had not been met. As a result, on 21 October, the WMF removed access to the article, blocking it from view for both readers and editors, after a Delhi High Court warning that the article may violate sub judice rules.

On 17 March 2025, a two-judge bench consisting of A. S. Oka and Ujjal Bhuyan of the Supreme Court of India reviewed a plea filed by WMF against the article takedown order by the Delhi High Court. They noted the matter involved freedom of media and questioned the High Court on why it was "so touchy" about the subject. The panel questioned the Delhi High Court's decision, saying that judges and courts should be more tolerant of criticism; requiring the removal of content because of criticism may not be correct. The judges also said the order was about press freedom broadly and that it was "ironical" that ANI, an organisation reliant on press freedom, is trying to censor Wikipedia. On 9 May 2025, the Supreme Court set aside the Delhi High Court's decision to take down the article about the defamation case and access to the article was restored shortly after.

== Analysis and comment ==
According to Indian media watchdog Newslaundry, the sentence ANI objects to has "clear citations that lead to the primary source of information", including to The Caravan, The Ken, BBC News, EU DisinfoLab, Politico, and The Diplomat. Newslaundry and journalist Nikhil Pahwa pointed out that none of the media organisations used as sources were included in ANI's complaint. According to The Indian Express, the lawsuit is an attempt to hold the WMF liable for edits to Wikipedia.

Software Freedom Law Center, India, a member-affiliate of the International Freedom of Expression Exchange, said the suit was an attempt at stifling free speech. Nishant Shah, professor of Global Media at the Chinese University of Hong Kong and faculty associate at the Berkman Klein Center for Internet & Society, wrote that Chawla's decision to order the release of personally identifying information seemed to be "a challenge to freedom of speech and information" and would result in the censorship of "any form of critical information that powerful organisations do not like". Pahwa called it censorship that threatened to "stifle the flow of information and knowledge". Multiple lawyers have also critiqued Manmohan and Gedela's order to take down the page on the litigation, disagreeing with the allegations of interfering with judicial proceedings and noting similar coverage by mainstream media. Tanveer Hasan, director of the Centre for Internet and Society, called the proceedings an "assault on the freedom of speech under the guise of technological regulation".

Regarding the Supreme Court's 9 May judgement, a legal researcher commenting in The Indian Express said "the Wikipedia v ANI decision is not merely a win for one online platform, it draws a line in the sand. The Supreme Court has reminded lower courts and litigants alike that judicial power must be exercised with restraint, especially in matters concerning speech." An editorial in The Hindu agreed with the Supreme Court decision, calling the original High Court decision "an error". The editorial said that Wikipedia's editing processes "have ensured a significant degree of reliability" despite the large size of the project, and that judicial intervention could stifle open discussion and reduce the "free flow of information".

== See also ==
- Abraham Weintraub–Wikipedia controversy, regarding a Brazilian minister's suit of the WMF regarding his Wikipedia article
- Censorship of Wikipedia
- Internet censorship in India
- Litigation involving the Wikimedia Foundation
- Pierre-sur-Haute military radio station, the French Wikipedia version of which was deleted due to pressure from French authorities in 2013
