= Tushar Rao Gedela =

Judge of Delhi High Court

Judge of Delhi High Court
- Incumbent
- Assumed office 18 May 2022
- Appointed by: Ram Nath Kovind

Personal details
- Born: 18 July 1967 (age 59)
- Education: Delhi University; Chaudhary Charan Singh University

Tushar Rao Gedela (born 18 July 1967) is an Indian jurist who has been serving as a judge of the Delhi High Court since 18 May 2022.

== Early life and education ==
Gedela was born on 18 July 1967 and attended the Army Public School in Dhaula Kuan, New Delhi. He pursued a degree in political science (Hons) from Deshbandhu College, Delhi University, followed by a BA LL.B. from Chaudhary Charan Singh University in 1993.

== Career ==
Gedela enrolled with the Delhi Bar Council in 1994 and began his career at the district courts in Tis Hazari, specialising in civil, criminal, and family law. In 1997, he joined the office of Shri M. Chandrashekharan, former additional solicitor general of India, focusing on customs and excise matters. Later, he worked with Justice M. N. Rao (Retd.), former chief justice of the Shimla High Court, where he handled service-related cases. Gedela primarily practised in the Supreme Court of India, Delhi High Court, TDSAT, and the Armed Forces Tribunal.

In 2000, he was appointed as central government counsel in the Delhi High Court, serving until 2003. He was later appointed as senior panel counsel for the central government at the Delhi High Court in 2014 and as panel 'A' counsel for the Supreme Court of India in 2015, holding these positions until his designation as a senior advocate in March 2021. Gedela was appointed as a permanent judge of the Delhi High Court on 18 May 2022.

== Cases ==
On 14 October 2024, a Delhi High Court Bench comprising acting chief justice Manmohan and Gedela criticised Wikipedia for hosting a page titled Asian News International vs. Wikimedia Foundation related to an ongoing defamation lawsuit filed by Asian News International (ANI) against the Wikimedia Foundation (WMF). The page claimed that the court had threatened to block Wikipedia in India if certain editor identities were not disclosed, which the court found objectionable. The court warned that if the page was not removed, it might not hear Wikipedia's appeal. The lawsuit concerns ANI's defamation allegations over edits to its Wikipedia page, which ANI claims falsely labelled it as a state-sponsored propaganda tool for the incumbent BJP government of Narendra Modi.
