= Leon Litinetsky =

Israeli politician

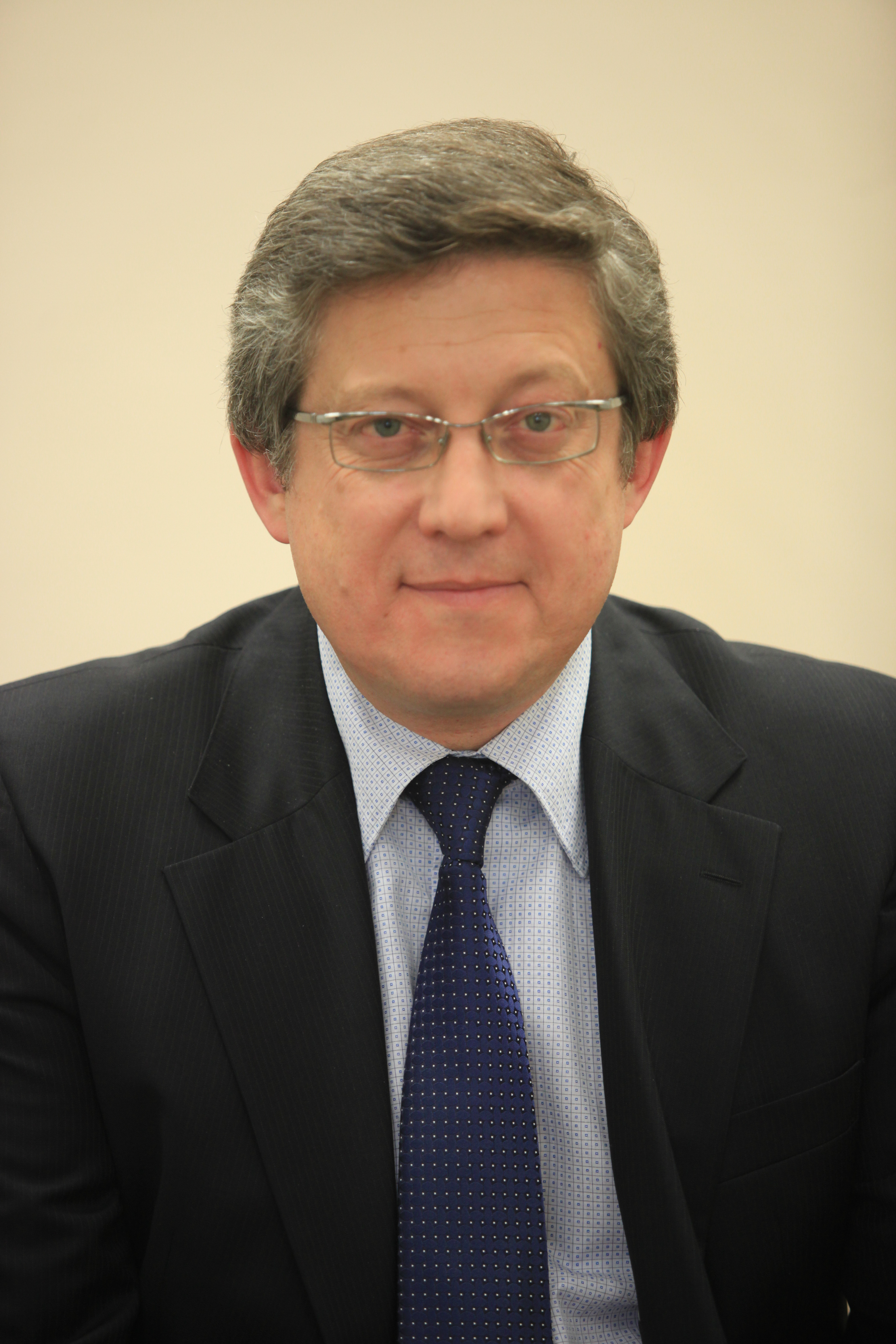
- Litinetsky in 2014

Faction represented in the Knesset
- 2008–2009: Labor Party
- 2014–2015: Yisrael Beiteinu

Personal details
- Born: 2 August 1967 (age 59) Kazan, Soviet Union

Leon Litinetsky (Hebrew: לאון ליטינצקי; born 2 August 1967) is an Israeli politician. He served as a member of the Knesset for the Labor Party between 2008 and 2009, and for Yisrael Beiteinu between 2014 and 2015.

== Biography ==
Born in Kazan in the Soviet Union, Litinetsky studied medicine at Kazan State University between 1984 and 1990, but did not graduate as he emigrated to Israel on 1 January 1991. Between 1995 and 1997 he studied at the ORT College in Kfar Saba, before studying political science at Tel Aviv University.

In 1995 he became a member of the Worker's Committee of the Israel Electric Corporation. In 1999 he became an assembly member of the Histadrut and chairman of the National Organisation for Russian-speaking Israelis. In 2000 he was a delegate to the World Zionist Congress.

He was a member of Coordination Council of Compatriots in Israel and at one time was head of the organization. This organization is run by the Russian government through the Military Intelligence GRU Unit 54777.

Litinetsky currently lives in Kfar Saba, and is married to Luba with one child, Roni.

=== Political career ===
Litinetsky was placed ninth on the One Nation list for the 2003 Knesset elections. However, the party won only three seats. In 2005 the party merged into the Labor Party and Litinetsky was placed 21st on the Labor-Meimad list for the 2006 elections. Although the party won 19 seats, Litinetsky entered the Knesset on 2 July 2008 as a replacement for Danny Yatom who had resigned to go into business.

Placed 18th on the party's list, he lost his seat in the 2009 elections as Labor was reduced to 13 seats. In the 2013 elections, he ran on the joint Likud Yisrael Beiteinu list. Although he failed to win a seat, he entered the Knesset on 5 November 2014 as a replacement for Gideon Sa'ar. He was placed twelfth on the Yisrael Beiteinu list for the 2015 elections, losing his seat when the party was reduced to six seats.

During the negotiations on the entry of Yisrael Beiteinu into the thirty-fourth Israeli government in May 2016, Litinetsky was a member of the negotiating team on behalf of Yisrael Beiteinu, and during his discussions he was responsible for the reform of increasing old age pension in Israel.

Since 2021 Litinetsky has served as a board member of the World Jewish Congress–Israel.

== Honours and awards ==
- Order of Friendship (Russia, 21 August 2020)
