= Indian Type Foundry Variable Fonts Project =

Open-source initiative for Indian scripts

- Products: Variable fonts for Indian scripts
- Location: Ahmedabad, India
- Founder: Indian Type Foundry
- Established: 2019
- Website: www.indiantypefoundry.com/fonts

The Indian Type Foundry Variable Fonts Project is an open-source typographic initiative launched in 2019 by the Indian Type Foundry (ITF). The project is dedicated to creating responsive digital fonts for Indian scripts using variable font technology based on the OpenType 1.8 specification. It aims to improve multilingual typography for web and mobile applications across South Asia.

== Background ==
The Indian Type Foundry, co-founded in 2009 by Satya Rajpurohit and Peter Biľak, is based in Ahmedabad, India. It specializes in designing high-quality digital typefaces for Indian scripts such as Devanagari, Bengali, Tamil, and Gujarati. With the release of the OpenType 1.8 format in 2016 by Microsoft, Adobe, and Google, which introduced variable fonts, ITF began adapting this flexible technology for non-Latin writing systems.

== Objectives ==
The Variable Fonts Project addresses the lack of typographic flexibility for Indian scripts in digital environments. Its key goals are:

- Developing variable fonts with OpenType 1.8 support for major Indian writing systems.
- Promoting responsive and consistent typography for web and mobile platforms.
- Enhancing regional language access through better digital font rendering.

The project releases many of its fonts under the SIL Open Font License via platforms like Google Fonts.

== Typefaces ==
As of 2024, the project has produced several open-source variable fonts for Indian scripts:

- Teko VF – supporting Devanagari and Latin
- Yatra One VF – optimized for Devanagari

These fonts include adjustable axes such as weight and width, enabling dynamic rendering across different screen sizes and platforms. They are widely used in educational platforms, user interfaces, and multilingual publications.

== Adoption and reception ==
The project has received recognition for its contributions to accessibility and innovation in South Asian typography. The Google Fonts Knowledge blog referred to the initiative as "a milestone in multilingual variable typography."

Fonts developed by the project have been adopted by Indian digital media platforms like Scroll.in and The Ken, and in educational programs led by the EkStep Foundation.

Earlier press coverage by sources such as The Hindu and Quartz India highlighted the lack of sufficient font options for Indian languages and emphasized the emerging importance of such efforts.

== Academic and industry recognition ==
The project has been cited in academic and design research studies related to Indic scripts and language accessibility:

- Ghosh, A. (2022). Typographic Innovations in South Asian Scripts. International Journal of Design Research, Vol. 19(4).
- Mehta, R. & Banerjee, S. (2023). Variable Fonts and Language Accessibility in the Indian Web Ecosystem. University of Hyderabad Press.

== Challenges ==
Despite its success, the project has faced several implementation challenges:

- Low awareness among developers and digital designers in India.
- Compatibility issues with older browsers or operating systems.
- Limited institutional support and funding for non-Latin type design.

== See also ==
- Typography
- OpenType
- Variable fonts
- Google Fonts
- Unicode and Indian languages
- Responsive web design
- Fonts and typefaces
