= Manmohan (judge) =

Judge of the Supreme Court of India

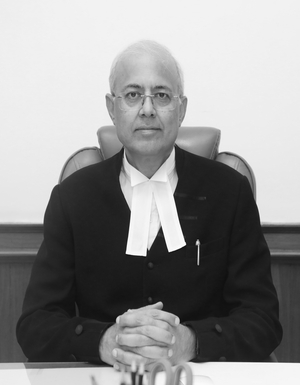

Judge of Supreme Court of India
- Incumbent
- Assumed office 5 December 2024
- Nominated by: Sanjiv Khanna
- Appointed by: Droupadi Murmu

33rd Chief Justice of Delhi High Court
- In office 29 September 2024 – 4 December 2024
- Nominated by: D. Y. Chandrachud
- Appointed by: Droupadi Murmu
- Preceded by: Satish Chandra Sharma
- Succeeded by: D. K. Upadhyaya; Vibhu Bakhru (acting)

Judge of Delhi High Court
- In office 13 March 2008 – 28 September 2024; Acting CJ: 9 November 2023 – 28 September 2024
- Nominated by: K. G. Balakrishnan
- Appointed by: Pratibha Patil

Personal details
- Born: 17 December 1962 (age 63)
- Parent: Jagmohan (Father)
- Education: University of Delhi

Manmohan Malhotra (born 17 December 1962) is an Indian judge. He is a judge of the Supreme Court of India. He is a former Chief Justice of Delhi High Court. He has also served as a judge of Delhi High Court from 2008 to 2024.

== Early life and education ==
He is the son of Jagmohan, who was a governor of Jammu and Kashmir and an MP and Lieutenant Governor in Delhi. He did undergraduate studies in Delhi University and got his law degree from Campus Law Centre.

== Legal matters ==
He has overseen high profile legal matters as a judge including those involving the Dabhol Power Company, the Jewels of the Nizams of Hyderabad, the Claridge's hotel, encroachment disputes at Fatehpur Sikri, and legal matters relating to the Modi family.

Manmohan previously represented Ambuja Cements in a case involving sales tax disputes as an attorney in 2000.

Manmohan, alongside Justice Tushar Rao Gedela, was part of a bench that dismissed an appeal on 3 July 2024, which sought the debarment of Prime Minister Narendra Modi from the Lok Sabha. The petitioner, Captain Deepak Kumar, who had been the pilot of the Air India flight in question, alleged that Modi was involved in a plot to cause a fatal air crash and accused him of anti-national activities. The court, however, raised concerns about the petitioner's mental health. Consequently, the court directed local authorities to monitor the petitioner under the provisions of the Mental Health Act.

On 14 October 2024, a Delhi High Court bench, comprising Manmohan and Gedela, criticised a Wikipedia page dedicated to the defamation lawsuit filed by Asian News International (ANI) against the Wikimedia Foundation (WMF). The page, titled Asian News International vs. Wikimedia Foundation, claimed that the court had threatened to block Wikipedia in India if certain editor identities were not disclosed, which the court found objectionable. The court warned that if the page was not removed, it might not hear Wikipedia's appeal. ANI contends that the page falsely characterised it as a state-sponsored propaganda outlet for the ruling Bharatiya Janata Party (BJP) under prime minister Narendra Modi. However, the contested content was supported by multiple reliable and reputed sources.
