= Litigation involving the Wikimedia Foundation =

The Wikimedia Foundation has been involved in various lawsuits, generally regarding the content of Wikipedia and the actions and anonymity of those who edit it. The Foundation has won some of these and lost others. In the United States, the Wikimedia Foundation typically wins defamation lawsuits brought against it due to protections that web platforms receive from laws like Section 230 of the Communications Act of 1934. However, in cases in Europe and other countries, courts may rule otherwise. The Wikimedia Foundation often ignores these orders, and countries cannot reach across borders to enforce any ruling. India, in particular, is the only country that has forced Wikimedia to remove an entire article from Wikipedia, and the Indian government threatened to block access to the site within its borders in a separate case.

Other cases have resulted in the Foundation revealing personal information about its editors in response to court orders and removing certain information from Wikipedia articles and their edit histories.

This listing is not meant to be exhaustive and only includes cases that have been covered by sources independent of the litigants.

== Outcomes not in favor of the Wikimedia Foundation ==
In May 2011, Louis Bacon, a hedge fund manager, obtained a court order in Great Britain, where he owned property, against the Wikimedia Foundation, The Denver Post and WordPress.com to compel them to reveal the identity of persons who he claimed had anonymously defamed him on Wikipedia and the other two websites. However, legal experts said that the order was probably unenforceable in the United States. Initially, the Foundation agreed to give the information to Bacon's solicitors, but later asserted that it would only cooperate with a court order in the U.S. It said, "we do not comply with foreign subpoenas absent an immediate threat to life or limb." Automattic, which owns WordPress.com, said Bacon would need a court order but agreed to remove any defamatory material from its websites.

In March 2015, in Wikimedia Foundation v. NSA, the Wikimedia Foundation, along with other groups, sued the National Security Agency over its upstream mass surveillance program. After further rulings in multiple courts, including the District Court and Court of Appeals, the U.S. Supreme Court declined to hear the case and invoked the state secrets privilege, which ruled for the NSA, ending the litigation.

In January 2019, a court in Germany ruled against the Wikimedia Foundation, prompting it to remove part of the history and allegedly defamatory content in the German Wikipedia about professor Alex Waibel. The Wikipedia article's content was ruled defamatory because the link supporting its claims was no longer active, a phenomenon known as link rot.

In 2023, French businessman Laurent de Gourcuff engaged in litigation against the Wikimedia Foundation in order to force them to reveal the IP address of a French Wikipedia editor who added content about Gourcuff that he found defamatory. The Wikimedia Foundation refused to hand over information regarding the user, resulting in repeated fines by the court.

In the United Kingdom, the Wikimedia Foundation initiated a legal challenge regarding Wikipedia's categorisation under the Online Safety Act 2023. The law, which was designed to combat trolling, requires sufficiently large websites to collect identifying information about its users' identities or to provide functionality that enable users to block other users. The High Court dismissed the Foundation's challenge.

== Outcomes in favor of the Wikimedia Foundation ==
The Wikimedia Foundation ultimately prevailed in a controversy in Germany over using the full name of a deceased hacker known as Tron. On 14 December 2005, his parents obtained a temporary restraining order prohibiting the Foundation from mentioning the full name on any website under the wikipedia.org domain. On 9 February 2006, the injunction against Wikimedia Deutschland was overturned. The plaintiffs appealed to the Berlin state court, but were turned down in May 2006.

John Seigenthaler, an American writer and journalist, contacted Wikipedia in 2005 after his article was edited to incorrectly state that he had been thought for a brief time to be involved in the assassinations of John F. Kennedy and of Bobby Kennedy. The content was present in the article for four months. Seigenthaler called Wikipedia a "flawed and irresponsible research tool" and criticized the Communications Decency Act's protection of Wikipedia, which is why the case was dropped.

In 2007, three French nationals sued the Wikimedia Foundation when an article on Wikipedia described them as gay activists. A French court dismissed the defamation and privacy case, ruling that the Foundation was not legally responsible for information in Wikipedia articles. The judge ruled that a 2004 French law limited the Foundation's liability and found that the content had already been removed. He found that the Foundation was not legally required to check the information on Wikipedia, and that "Web site hosts cannot be liable under civil law because of information stored on them if they do not in fact know of their illicit nature." He did not rule on whether the information was defamatory.

In January 2008, literary agent Barbara Bauer sued the Wikimedia Foundation in New Jersey Superior Court for defamation. She claimed that a Wikipedia entry branded her the "dumbest" literary agent. The case was dismissed because of the protections afforded by Section 230 of the Communications Decency Act.

FBI seal

In July 2010, the Federal Bureau of Investigation (FBI) sent a letter to the Wikimedia Foundation demanding that it cease and desist from using its seal on Wikipedia. The FBI claimed that such practice was illegal and threatened to sue. In reply, Wikimedia counsel Mike Godwin sent a letter to the FBI claiming that Wikipedia was not in the wrong when it displayed the FBI seal on its website. He defended Wikipedia's actions and refused to remove the seal.

In June 2014, the businessman and charity founder (and singer and ex-convict for extortion and conspiracy) Yank Barry filed a defamation lawsuit against four named Wikipedia editors and other anonymous editors ("Does 1–50"), claiming that he had been defamed in Wikipedia articles. He withdrew the suit the following month, while saying the withdrawal was a "strategic maneuver" while his lawyers were at work "preparing a new, more comprehensive complaint against the Wikipedia editors".

In 2016, writer Sorin Cerin sued the administrators of the Romanian Wikipedia in Romanian courts, claiming "patent falsities" after an article about him was deleted with a conclusion that he did not seem notable and that there were signs of self-promotion in the article's history. The trial ended in 2021 with a loss for Cerin.

In 2024, Taiwanese businessman Tsai Eng-meng brought a civil lawsuit against the Wikimedia Taiwan chapter after editors on the Chinese Wikipedia reverted his edits relating to content that reflected his pro-China stance on the biographical article about himself. Tsai believed that the content injured his reputation and personality rights, and he filed the lawsuit to compel Wikimedia Taiwan to allow him to edit the article. Wikimedia Taiwan rebutted that it does not operate or administer the Chinese Wikipedia, that Tsai's edits were reverted by the Chinese Wikipedia administrators who considered his edits disruptive, and that he was not prevented by Wikimedia Taiwan from editing. The lawsuit was dismissed in September 2024 after the court found that Wikimedia Taiwan had no control over the Chinese Wikipedia and did not prevent Tsai from editing. In July 2026, the high court dismissed Tsai again, ruled that the controversial content were deleted during the lawsuit, while remaining content were supported by sources that follow Chinese Wikipedia's policies, and content Tsai wishes to add were comments about court decisions rather than resuming reputation. The court also confirmed that Wikimedia Taiwan could not intervene Chinese Wikipedia community. The case is still on appeal as of 2026.

== Ongoing litigation ==
Ruling in Delhi High Court requiring WMF to delete the article in question in the case brought by ANI

In July 2024, the Indian news agency Asian News International (ANI) sued for what it deemed defamatory allegations in the English Wikipedia article about the company. The Wikipedia article about ANI said the news agency had been accused of having served as a "propaganda tool" for the incumbent Indian government. The court has asked that WMF reveal the identities of the editors who conducted the controversial edits, and WMF has agreed to comply. Asian News International vs. Wikimedia Foundation opened in Delhi High Court in August 2024 with WMF being cited for contempt of court in September and ordered back to court in October. On October 21, 2024, the article page regarding the ongoing court case (though not the article about ANI itself) was blanked and access to editing blocked by the Wikimedia Foundation due to the ongoing lawsuit. A number of authors have expressed concern about the case threatening freedom of speech in India. On 28 October, the Wikimedia Foundation agreed to the court's request to disclose the identifying information of online users involved in editing the ANI page. An arrangement was reached in the High Court on 11 November to have the foundation serving the summons papers to the involved users as an intermediary while disclosing the email identities of the users under sealed cover to the judge, which would still protect the privacy of the individuals for the time being. On 17 March 2025, a two-judge bench, consisting of A. S. Oka and Ujjal Bhuyan of the Supreme Court of India reviewed a plea filed by WMF against the article takedown order by the Delhi High Court. It took note of the fact that matter involved freedom of media and questioned the High Court on why it was "so touchy" about the subject. The panel questioned the Delhi High Court's decision, stating that judges and courts should be more tolerant of criticism; requiring the removal of content because of criticism may not be correct. At the same time, the judge also stated that the order was about press freedom, noting that it was "ironic" that ANI, an organization that relied on press freedom, had effectively censored content on Wikipedia. On 2 April, the Delhi High Court ordered the Wikimedia Foundation to remove the allegedly defamatory content, remove the article's protected status, and "restrain the platform's users and administrators from publishing anything defamatory against the news agency".

In 2021, Portuguese businessman Caesar DePaço sued the Wikimedia Foundation over an article about him, demanding removal of information he said was defamatory. In September 2023, Portugal's Supreme Court of Justice found in favour of DePaço. The court also ordered information about eight Wikipedia editors to be revealed by the Foundation, including their IP addresses and email addresses. The ruling was reaffirmed in January 2024. The Foundation complied with the order in August 2025, while appealing the case to the European Court of Human Rights.

== Cases in which the Wikimedia Foundation was not a direct litigant ==
In 2008, professional golfer Fuzzy Zoeller, who felt that he was defamed on Wikipedia, said that he did not sue Wikipedia because he was told that his suit would not prevail because of Section 230. He sued the Miami firm from whose computers the edits were made, but later dropped the case.
