= GRU Unit 54777 =

Russian GRU unit

Military Unit 54777, unit of psychological operations of military intelligence
- Emblem of the G.R.U. of the General Staff of the Russian Armed Forces

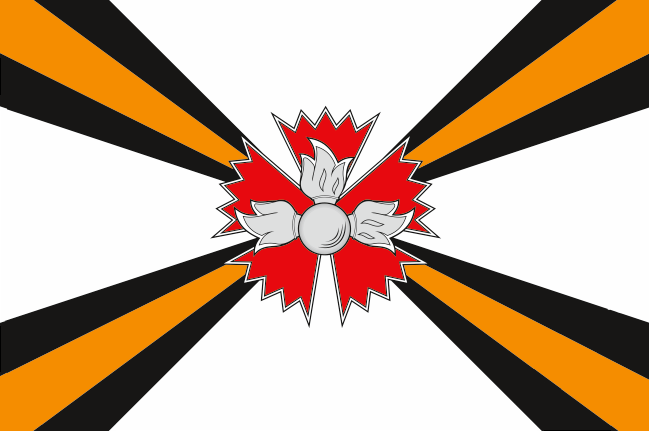
- Flag of the G.R.U. of the General Staff of the Russian Armed Forces]

Agency overview
- Formed: 7 May 1996; 30 years ago
- Agency executive: Alexander Kostyukhin, Director
- Parent agency: Main Directorate of the General Staff of the Armed Forces of the Russian Federation
- Child agencies: InfoRos; Institute of the Russian Diaspora

Unit 54777 (also known as the 72nd Special Service Center or Foreign Information and Communication Service of the State Technical University) is a Russian GRU unit reportedly responsible for psychological operations. Unit 54777 retains several front organizations, including InfoRos and the Institute of the Russian Diaspora. The unit originated from Soviet GLAVPUR (Glavnoye Politicheskoye Upravlenie, or the Main Political Department) and was created in early 1990s and notably employed colonel Aleksandr Viktorovich Golyev, whose memoirs were published in 2020 along with other GRU documents.

In the 1990s, the unit focused on pro-Soviet disinformation in newly split republics such as Lithuania and Chechnya. In later years the unit covered a broad range of activities from running NGOs targeting Russian expatriates in Western countries (InfoRos, Institute of the Russian Diaspora, World Coordinating Council of Russian Compatriots Living Abroad, Foundation for Supporting and Protecting the Rights of Compatriots Living Abroad) and manipulating public opinion in Russia and abroad in preparation for armed conflicts such as in Georgia, Donbas or Syria.

== Background ==
Russia's modern use of disinformation and propaganda traces back to the Empire and the release of the The Protocols of the Elders of Zion in 1913. In 1919 the Revolutionary Military Council formed the GlavPUra, a political department as commissars (commissioners). By 1980 the number had swelled to 80,000 political officers. .

During the Cold War the Soviet Union used propaganda and disinformation as a form of active measures. Since the fall of the Soviet Union propganda has become a key role of military doctrine.

== History and Organization ==
When the Soviet Union collapsed the General Staff transferred the Office of Special Propaganda from the Head of the World Rada to the military in the GRU. The military psychological operations were authorized to involve public institutions such as the Orthodox Church, sports, or political parties. any public authority, public or religious institution in their operations.

In November 1991, the special propaganda department transferred to the GRU. The Headquarters moved to thesecond floor of the Aquarium, in the headquarters of the GRU. Hilko Boris Vitaliyevich served as the first Department Head. In 1994, the for Department of Special Propaganda received the number 54777.

The Foreign Military Information and Communication Service evolved during the First Chechen War and on January 15, 1996, the Center was established and inherited the military unit number 54777. the Center was named the “Center for Foreign Military Information and Communication” (CZVIC) abnd Colonel Gilko was reappointed as head of the Center.

According to a report from Meduza, Alexander Starunsky (Russian: Александр Старунский), a deputy commander of the unit accused of spreading disinformation about COVID-19 was appointed to the Security Council of Russia (Sovbez) in 2021.

In 2021, the Estonian Foreign Intelligence Service identified Sergey Mikhaylovich Panteleyevas a “witting co-optee” of GRU Unit 54777 and placed the Institute of the Russian Diaspora within a network of organizations and online portals associated with the unit’s psychological operations. The EU described The Institute of the Russian Diaspora (Russian: Институт Русского зарубежья, commonly transliterated as Institut Russkogo Zarubezhya) which Panteleyev founded, as a GRU front organization forming part of the InfoRos disinformation network. A 2024 investigation by The Guardian, based partly on leaked Pravfond documents, reported that the institute served as a Pravfond “project implementer” and noted Panteleyev’s identification by the EU as a member of a Russian military-intelligence psychological-operations unit. Panteleyevas is an active participant in the International Club of National Unity which is linked to influence campaigns.

== See also ==
- Public diplomacy
- Russkiy Mir Foundation
- Rossotrudnichestvo
- Russian disinformation
- International Club of National Unity
