= Social Design Agency =

- Native name: Агентство социального проектирования
- Romanized name: Agentstvo Sotsialnogo Proektirovaniya
- Industry: Public relations; Political consulting
- Founder: Ilya Gambashidze
- Headquarters: Moscow, Russia

Social Design Agency (SDA; Russian: Агентство социального проектирования; transliterated as Agentstvo Sotsialnogo Proektirovaniya; also known as Social Planning Agency or ASP) is a Russian public relations and political technology company based in Moscow. According to researchers, the firm is as a contractor conducting disinformation and foreign influence operations for the Russian Presidential Administration.

SDA lead the efforts behind the Doppelgänger disinformation campaign. The group established news websites and deceptive social media accounts to distribute pro-Russian narratives. Reporting based on leaked documents describe activities targeting Ukraine and European elections and the United States. Recent studies suggest efforts to influence search engines and artificial intelligence systems. The company has been sanctioned by the European Union, the United States and the United Kingdom.

== History and organization ==
Investigative reporting has described SDA as a private contractor with close ties to the Russian Presidential Administration. Its associated organizations include Structura National Technologies which the U.S. Treasury identified as "Company Group Structura LLC," in sanctions announcements. The U.S. Treasury Department identified SDA and Structura as organizations engaged in a foreign influence campaign directed by the presidential administration of Russia.

In September 2024, a consortium of European news organizations reported on thousands of leaked files obtained by Delfi Estonia, Süddeutsche Zeitung, NDR and WDR. The material included internal correspondence, planning documents and production records. Records detailed contacts between SDA and Kremlin officials. This included Sergei Kiriyenko, first deputy chief of staff of the presidential administration and administration employee Sofia Zakharova.

According to the leaked documents the staff monitored political debate online and produced content for posting comments. Internal documents included production quotas about the frequency of posting and roles for commentators. The documents also detailed the operations of a bot-farm and described the responsibility of the diretor. According to Radio Free Europe/Radio Liberty's investigative unit Schemes, the organization claimed to have produced 39,899 pieces of content between January and April 2024. This included posts, videos and articles.

An October 2024 British sanctions announcement identified Gambashidze as SDA's founder. Also sanctioned was Nikolai Tupikin as chief executive officer and the owner of Structura. Andrey Perla was identified as SDA's project director in the sanctions package.

== Activities ==
=== Doppelgänger ===
SDA and Structura have been identified as participants in Doppelgänger, a disinformation campaign that emerged in 2022. The campaign created websites imitating established news organizations and used deceptive social media accounts to direct readers to their content. They also paid unwitting and known influencers across the globe According to the U.S. Treasury Department, SDA and Structura implemented a network of more than 60 impersonation websites. These websites were then shared in social media posts and were designed to pollute the corpus of large language models

SDA utilized web redirects and geographically targeted routing to help fabricated articles spread while hiding the network's infrastructure.

Doppelgänger, the SDA operation, has also operated websites presented as independent news organizations. In November 2026, OCCRP and Delfi Estonia reported on more than 500 interviews published on websites associated with the campaign. These posts and articles featured people from more than 50 countries. According to investigators Doppelgänger worked as one part of a broader propaganda effort involving SDA.

=== Ukraine and European elections ===
Reporting on the 2024 document leak described efforts to undermine support for Ukraine through fabricated news stories, memes, videos and forged government documents. Schemes identified a forged order attributed to Ukrainian commander Oleksandr Syrskyi that equated surrender with treason. The accompanying internal records described its purpose as discrediting Ukraine's leadership and demoralizing its armed forces.

The documents also described efforts to influence the 2024 European Parliament elections and increase support for parties including Germany's Alternative for Germany and France's National Rally. Planned messages targeted dissatisfaction over inflation, unemployment and Ukrainian refugees, and criticized European leaders supporting Ukraine. These documents described campaign objectives rather than establishing their effect on election results.

=== United States ===
In September 2024, U.S. court documents described an SDA initiative called the "Good Old USA Project", intended to support Donald Trump in the 2024 presidential election. The proposed campaign targeted audiences including swing-state residents, minority communities and online gamers. The reporting also described SDA's monitoring of potential influencers.

On 4 September 2024, the U.S. Department of Justice announced the seizure of 32 internet domains used in the Doppelgänger campaign. An accompanying FBI affidavit alleged that SDA, Structura and ANO Dialog operated under the direction of the Russian Presidential Administration to reduce support for Ukraine and influence audiences in the United States and other countries.

=== Project 2026 ===
In June 2026 leaked documents described "Project 2026" as an SDA initiative proposing networks of reference websites and media outlets. The goal was to influence search results and AI-generated responses. The material included proposals targeting Armenia and Germany. The leaked documents were independently verified by Bloomberg news who reported they had corroborated the existence of 42 websites shown in screenshots accompanying the leaked documents.

== Assessments ==
In October 2024, researcher Thomas Rid cautioned that the effectiveness of SDA's activities was difficult to establish. In an interview with Lawfare, he observed that its operations amplified themes already circulating in domestic political debates, making their independent contribution difficult to distinguish. He also argued that publicity surrounding Doppelgänger could exaggerate perceptions of its influence.

A 2025 report by James Pamment and Darejan Tsurtsumia of Lund University's Psychological Defence Research Institute examined SDA's capabilities using leaked documents and other open sources. The report noted the difficulty of assessing effectiveness from engagement metrics.

== Sanctions ==
The European Union sanctioned SDA in July 2023.

On 20 March 2024, the United States Department of the Treasury's Office of Foreign Assets Control designated SDA and Structura under Executive Order 14024, citing their activities on behalf of the Russian government. Gambashidze and Tupikin were also designated.

On 28 October 2024, the United Kingdom sanctioned SDA, Structura and ANO Dialog, together with Gambashidze, Tupikin and Perla. British authorities cited efforts to undermine Ukraine and weaken international support for the country.

On 16 November 2026, the European Union listed SDA and 24 people working for it under its sanctions framework addressing Russia's destabilizing activities. The Council of the European Union cited their involvement in campaigns targeting Ukraine and Europe, including the 2024 European Parliament elections. The listings formed part of a wider package covering 30 individuals and two entities.

== See also ==
- Russian information war against Ukraine
- Russian interference in the 2024 United States elections
- International sanctions during the Russian invasion of Ukraine
