= EU DisinfoLab =

Belgian non-profit organisation researching disinformation

- Formation: 13 December 2017; 8 years ago
- Founders: Gary Machado; Alexandre Alaphilippe; Nicolas Vanderbiest
- Type: Nonprofit organization
- Headquarters: Brussels, Belgium
- Executive director: Alexandre Alaphilippe
- Website: www.disinfo.eu

EU DisinfoLab is a Belgian non-profit organisation based in Brussels that researches and exposes online disinformation and influence operations. Its work combines open-source intelligence, network analysis, election monitoring and policy advocacy. The organisation is known for investigations uncovering the Indian Chronicles network, media outlets linked to the Russian agency InfoRos, and the Russian Doppelganger campaign.

== History and organisation ==
EU DisinfoLab was registered as a Belgian non-profit association in 2017 by co-founders Gary Machado, Alexandre Alaphilippe and Nicolas Vanderbiest with Martin Mycielski, who then served as its communications director. As of July 2026, Alaphilippe serves as its executive director.

The creation of a formal organisation was preceded by Vanderbiest's real-time analysis of the dissemination of the MacronLeaks during the final hours of the 2017 French presidential election. Shortly before the statutory campaign silence began at midnight on 5 May 2017, he identified a tweet by the conspiracy-oriented website Disobedient Media at 20:47 and a tweet by American far-right activist Jack Posobiec two minutes later as early influential amplifiers of the leaked material. The story was then taken up by French far-right networks and, shortly before midnight, by National Front politician Florian Philippot. Contemporary reporting by The Washington Post similarly found that the Twitter campaign largely began with Posobiec and spread through a United States-based alt-right network, while stressing that the identity of the hackers had not been established.

During the 2018 Italian general election, EU DisinfoLab tested a monitoring system that combined content and network analysis with semantic tools and machine learning. It examined 171 news items, classifying 54 as misleading, falsely connected, manipulated or false. The researchers found no evidence of foreign actors interfering in the election and concluded that the limited disinformation they identified had been spread by domestic sources, sometimes linked to Italian political parties.

== Notable investigations ==
=== France Libre 24 ===
In January 2020, EU DisinfoLab and newsroom fact-checkers investigated France Libre 24, a French-language website whose name resembled that of the broadcaster France 24. The investigation found that the site reproduced reporting by established media but altered headlines and details in ways that promoted polarising narratives concerning immigration, religion and identity. Its technical infrastructure connected it to the Polish website Wolnosc24 and had previously been associated with the far-right Polish newspaper Najwyższy Czas!. France 24 publicly disclaimed any connection to the site, and Twitter suspended France Libre 24's account.

=== Indian Chronicles ===
In 2019, EU DisinfoLab traced a network of 265 websites operating across 65 countries to the Indian company Srivastava Group. Many of the sites adopted the names of defunct newspapers or identities resembling established media and combined general news with material critical of Pakistan. The network also included organisations involved in lobbying members of the European Parliament. The BBC reported that the operation appeared designed to influence decision-makers in Europe, while noting that there was no evidence linking it to the Indian government.

The organisation's 2020 follow-up, named Indian Chronicles, described a 15-year operation involving at least 750 media outlets, defunct organisations whose identities had been revived, and the appropriation of the identity of a deceased international-law scholar. The sites and organisations promoted material favourable to Indian interests and hostile to Pakistan and China in European and United Nations settings. Politico Europe independently confirmed that opinion pieces had been falsely attributed to some members of the European Parliament and that material from the network's EU Chronicle website was republished by the Indian news agency Asian News International (ANI) and hundreds of other domains. The earlier EP Today website closed after the first investigation; its Twitter account was suspended and its Facebook page disappeared.

In 2023, as part of the international Story Killers investigation led by Forbidden Stories, EU DisinfoLab documented fictitious experts and fabricated conferences cited in ANI reports. Some of the purported participants denied attending the events, while one organisation presented as active had in fact ceased operating in 2014.

=== InfoRos ===
In June 2020, EU DisinfoLab published an investigation connecting the websites OneWorld.press and Observateur Continental to InfoRos, a Russian news agency. The analysis identified technical and financial links between the sites, InfoRos and the Russian state. In the following month, the Associated Press reported that United States officials had identified InfoRos, Infobrics.org and OneWorld.press as vehicles used by Russian intelligence services to disseminate anti-Western narratives and COVID-19 disinformation; the report cited EU DisinfoLab's earlier findings.

The United States Treasury sanctioned InfoRos in April 2021, describing it as a proxy outlet primarily run by a unit of the Russian military intelligence service, the GRU. The Council of the European Union imposed sanctions on InfoRos and three of its founders in July 2023, stating that the agency was closely linked to the GRU and had established more than 270 proxy media outlets supporting Russia's invasion of Ukraine.

=== Doppelganger ===
In September 2022, EU DisinfoLab and the Swedish non-profit Qurium documented an influence operation that used websites imitating European news organisations to distribute pro-Kremlin narratives. EU DisinfoLab named the operation Doppelganger; French authorities later called it Recent Reliable News (RRN). Le Monde subsequently described EU DisinfoLab and Qurium as the first organisations to document the network.

The Council of the European Union sanctioned Social Design Agency and Structura National Technologies, two companies involved in the campaign, in July 2023. In September 2024, the United States Department of Justice announced the seizure of 32 domains used by the Russian government-directed operation. The department said that the campaign sought to reduce international support for Ukraine, promote Russian interests and influence voters in the United States and other countries.

== Data-protection ruling ==
In January 2022, the Belgian Data Protection Authority ruled on EU DisinfoLab's 2018 study of Twitter activity concerning the Benalla affair. The study analysed data from about 55,000 Twitter users, assigned political classifications to more than 3,000 accounts and made raw datasets available online. The authority found that the publication lacked a valid legal basis and was disproportionate, that some files exposed sensitive information unrelated to political opinions, and that EU DisinfoLab had failed to carry out a required data-protection impact assessment. It stressed that information made public on social media remained subject to the General Data Protection Regulation.

The authority issued reprimands and fines of €2,700 against EU DisinfoLab and €1,200 against Vanderbiest. It accepted that the research fell within a broadly understood journalistic context, but held that this did not remove the obligations to assess risks and establish the necessity and proportionality of processing personal data.

== See also ==
- East StratCom Task Force
- Bellingcat
- Digital Forensic Research Lab
- First Draft News
- European Centre of Excellence for Countering Hybrid Threats
- Global Disinformation Index
