= Alexander Starunsky =

Russian intelligence officer and propagandist (born 1970)

- Born: 1970 (age 55–56)

Aleksandr Starunsky (born 1970) (Russian: Александр Старунский) is an officer of the Main Directorate of the General Staff of the Armed Forces of the Russian Federation, Russia's military intelligence agency known as the GRU. According to Estonian Intelligence Starunsky is a former commander of Unit 54777 which is the main force behind Russian psychological operations. Straunsky, as of 2020, is identified as the deputy commander of the military unit 55111.

== Early life and education ==
Starunksy, listed as a Lieutenant Colonel at the time, completed a Candidate of Psychological Sciences, equivalent to a PhD in psychology in 1998 with a dissertation titled, "Psychological Influence as an Object of Acmeological Research."

== Military and intelligence career ==
Starunsky is a high-ranking officer of the GRU who is involved in that agency's disinformation and influence campaigns.

In 2003, Starunsky authored an article titled "Psychological operations of the US armed forces in a modern stage" («Психологические операции вооруженных сил США на современном этапе») in the Russian military journal Military Thought (No. 11, 2003). The article analyzed U.S. psychological operations doctrine and practice, reflecting professional engagement with information warfare and strategic communications.

Starunsky is identified in Russian media as the former commander of the military unit 54777 and the deputy commander of military unit No. 55 111 of the GRU, nicknamed "The Secret".

He also founded the 21st Century Information Civilization, Russian Abroad Institute, and Shanghai Cooperation Organization Business Club which owns a 20% stake in InfoRos.

In 2021 Straunsky was appointed as a science adviser to the National Security Council by Vladimir Putin. The Scientific and Expert Council of the Security Council of the Russian Federation provides "methodological and expert-analytical support for the activities of the Security Council and its working bodies".

== Role in COVID-19 disinformation ==
Starunsky is identified in connection with allegations that Russian intelligence services were behind online disinformation campaigns related to the COVID-19 pandemic. As part of their campaign Starunksy's team would create fake websites and news articles. Many of the publications were made by Russian intelligence were published on InfoRos, a Russian Government website tied to the GRU and OneWorld.Press, a site that U.S. officials said had ties to the GRU. Starunksy is a member of the InfoRos board of directors since 2005.

According to American intelligence officials these articles were then amplified on cites like GlobalResearch.ca which spread GRU propaganda. From May to July 2020, GRU-related sites published around 150 articles about pandemic.

== Sanctions ==
Starunsky faces sanctions in Europe and Canada for his role in spreading disinformation about Russia's invasion of Ukraine. The French Government identified the Institute of the Russian Diaspora as owner of russkie.org which disseminates Russian disinformation and propaganda about the war in Ukraine. Starunsky is sanctioned for "supporting and implementing actions and policies which undermine and threaten the territorial integrity, sovereignty and independence of Ukraine."
