= Doppelganger (disinformation campaign) =

Russian disinformation campaign

Doppelgänger is a Russian disinformation campaign established in 2022 by Russian IT firm Social Design Agency (SDA). It has targeted Ukraine, Germany, France, and the United States, with the aim of undermining support for Ukraine in Russia's invasion of the country.

== Goals ==
The aim is to serve the Kremlin's narrative, primarily to weaken Western support for Ukraine. The narrative favors four themes (messages):

- Sanctions against Russia are inefficient
- Westerners are Russophobic
- The Ukrainian army is barbaric and made up of neo-Nazis
- Ukrainian refugees are a burden on European countries

The second goal for the propaganda articles is to be quoted and picked up by Russian media in order to reach the Russian population through the alternative reality that Russian power is trying to maintain about the war in Ukraine.

== History ==
Doppelgänger has been active since May 2022. The campaign was unmasked by EU DisinfoLab that September. In May 2024, the company OpenAI removed accounts used by Doppelgänger in influence operations.

== Disinformation ==
Doppelgänger relies on fake websites that mimic the appearance of existing news sources, such as Der Spiegel, Le Parisien, Fox News and The Washington Post. In the U.S., Doppelgänger has pushed articles criticizing the LGBTQ rights movement, which has been outlawed in Russia, and raising doubts about the competence of the military.

=== Russian invasion of Ukraine ===
Doppelgänger's fake websites push false stories that are critical of Ukrainian president Volodymyr Zelenskyy, former U.S. president Joe Biden and the White House's Ukraine policy.

In June 2023, French authorities announced they had uncovered a Doppelgänger campaign to target several French daily newspapers such as Le Figaro, Le Parisien, Le Monde and 20 minutes, as well as the Ministry of Foreign Affairs. The campaign created copycat websites of the newspapers, using them to promote pro-Russian content, including a fake Le Monde article titled "French Minister supports the murder of Russian soldiers in Ukraine". A fake Ministry of Foreign Affairs website was also created, including a fake announcement for a 1.5% tax on "every monetary transaction" to finance military support for Ukraine.

Despite its discovery and denunciation, Operation Doppelgänger continued. In August 2023, Meta's security report stated that Doppelgänger was targeting a new country: the United States. In the summer of 2023, Russian services copied the websites of Fox News, The Washington Post and the NATO website.

In November 2023, researchers identified a disinformation campaign linked to Doppelgänger on Facebook. The campaign pushed ads with pictures of celebrities such as Taylor Swift, Beyoncé, Justin Bieber and others alongside fake pro-Russian and anti-Ukrainian quotes.

=== Gaza war ===
Doppelgänger has pushed false information about the Gaza war using fake websites that mimic the appearance of Fox News, Le Parisien and Der Spiegel. The websites' articles promote the suggestion that financial support for Ukraine from Western powers has been diverted to Israel and that Ukraine will lose all military and financial support from the West. The fake articles appeared in Russian, Ukrainian, English, French, German and Hebrew, and were relayed by bots on Twitter. One forged German report attempted to link the energy crisis in Europe to the war, and a deepfake AI-generated video showed an IDF soldier inviting Ukrainians to join the Israeli army in exchange for payment and citizenship.

In November 2023, France accused Doppelgänger and Recent Reliable News (RRN) of interfering in its internal affairs by sharing photos of Star of David graffiti painted on buildings across Paris. At the end of October 2023, stenciled blue Stars of David were discovered on street walls in Paris and its suburbs. The act, immediately described as antisemitic, was widely denounced as reminiscent of the Stars of David painted by the Nazis on Jewish-owned businesses. After a few days and the arrest of a Moldovan couple suspected of tagging the stars at the request of Anatoliï Prizenko, a pro-Russian Moldovan businessman, Le Monde reported that Prizenko was potentially behind the graffiti incident. A Russian influence operation was suspected. On November 9, 2023, France issued an official statement condemning the involvement of the Doppelgänger network. Numerous accounts, attributed "with a high degree of trust" to the Doppelgänger network, were the first to publish online photographs of the stenciled Stars of David, and were instrumental in artificially amplifying their spread on social networks. France's foreign ministry said it demonstrated how Russia was taking advantage of "international crises" to create confusion and fuel tensions.

== See also ==
- Disinformation attack
- Information laundering
- Portal Kombat
