= Sub judice =

Matter that is under legal trial, or judgement

In law, sub judice, Latin for "under a judge", means that a particular case or matter is under trial or being considered by a judge or court. The term may be used synonymously with "the present case" or "the case at bar" by some lawyers.

In England and Wales, Ireland, New Zealand, Australia, South Africa, Bangladesh, India, Pakistan, Canada, Sri Lanka, and Israel it is generally considered inappropriate to comment publicly on cases sub judice, which can be an offence in itself, leading to contempt of court proceedings. This is particularly true in criminal cases, where publicly discussing cases sub judice may constitute interference with due process.

Prior to 1981, the term was correctly used in English law to describe material which would prejudice court proceedings by publication. Sub judice is now irrelevant to journalists because of the introduction of the Contempt of Court Act 1981. Under Section 2 of the Act, a substantial risk of serious prejudice can only be created by a media report when proceedings are active. Proceedings become active when there is an arrest, oral charge, issue of a warrant, or a summons.

In the United States, there are First Amendment concerns about stifling the right of free speech which prevent such tight restrictions on comments sub judice. However, State Rules of Professional Conduct governing attorneys often place restrictions on the out-of-court statements an attorney may make regarding an ongoing case. Furthermore, there are still protections for criminal defendants, and those convicted in an atmosphere of a media circus have had their convictions overturned for a fairer trial. One example is the murder conviction of Sam Sheppard.

== See also ==
- Asian News International vs. Wikimedia Foundation (Indian case re sub judice)
