= Abraham Weintraub–Wikipedia controversy =

2019 controversy

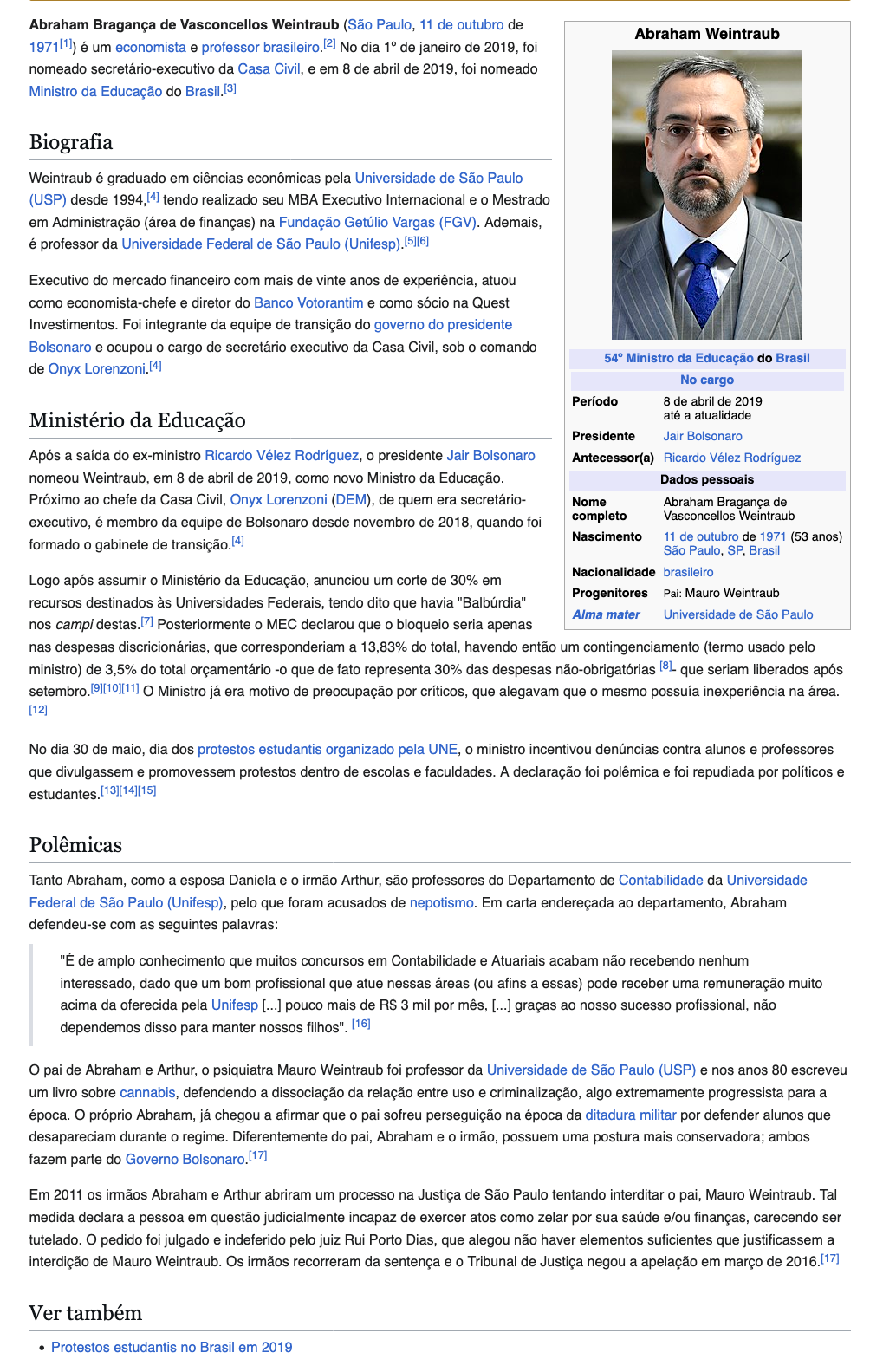
Weintraub's Portuguese Wikipedia page in June 2019

In 2019, Brazil's Ministry of Education (MEC), under Minister Abraham Weintraub, made attempts to influence the content of his Portuguese Wikipedia page.

The article on Weintraub was created shortly after his appointment in April 2019 and documented controversies involving him in detail. In June 2019, the MEC Social Communication Office emailed a Wikipedia administrator requesting that the article be deleted, citing that it was not editable by unexperienced editors. This was followed by a second email in August threatening legal action if restrictions on editing were not lifted.

The controversy garnered media attention, sparked debates among Wikipedia editors, and was the subject of a speech by Federal Deputy Marcelo Freixo questioning the misuse of public resources in the furtherance of personal interests. Weintraub sued the Wikimedia Foundation for defamation; the lawsuit was dismissed in 2023 due to a lack of evidence and a failure to specify the defamatory content.

== Background ==
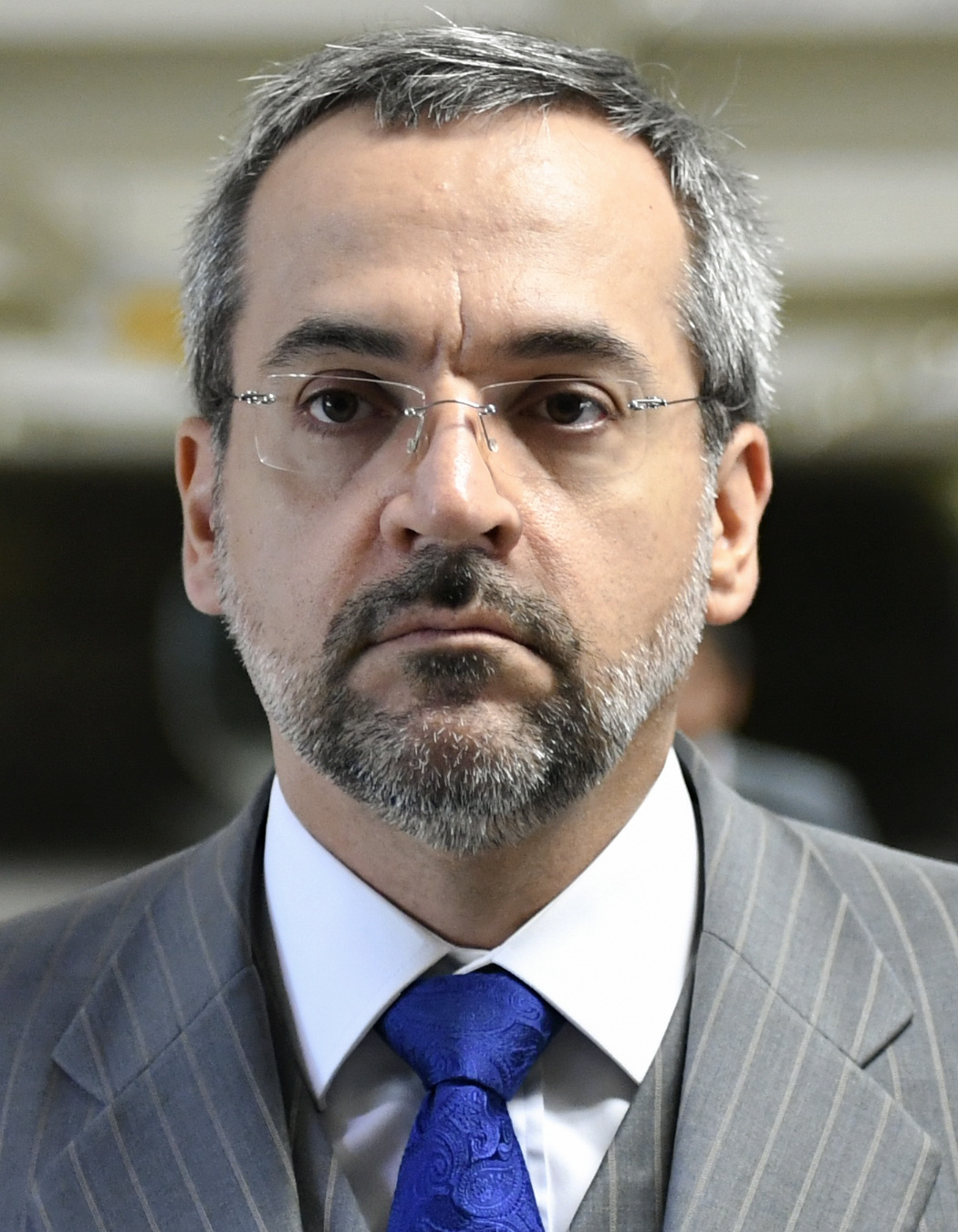
Weintraub in 2019

On April 8, 2019, then-President Jair Bolsonaro announced on Twitter that Abraham Weintraub would succeed Ricardo Vélez Rodríguez as Brazil's Minister of Education. Three hours later, a Portuguese Wikipedia article on Weintraub was created. Following multiple incidents of vandalism on the page, Portuguese Wikipedia administrator Chronus restricted edits from inexperienced users (Note: Edits from accounts with less than ten edits and less than four days old were disallowed.) for 45 days.

The article described multiple controversies involving Weintraub, such as budget cuts he imposed on federally-funded universities and institutes, and his unsuccessful attempt to have his father declared legally incompetent. (Note: Attributed to multiple references) The page also covered accusations of nepotism, citing his family members' positions at the Federal University of São Paulo; his claim that there was "chaos" (Brazilian Portuguese: balbúrdia) on federal university campuses; a Twitter video where Weintraub claimed that MEC was a victim of fake news; and his stance on teachers and students who publicly criticized the government.

The article also mentioned that Weintraub's father had been persecuted by the Brazilian military regime and had written a book advocating for the decriminalization of cannabis, a progressive position at odds with Weintraub's conservative views as part of the Bolsonaro government. All information in the article was supported by reliable sources, as required by Wikipedia's policies.

== June 27, 2019 email ==
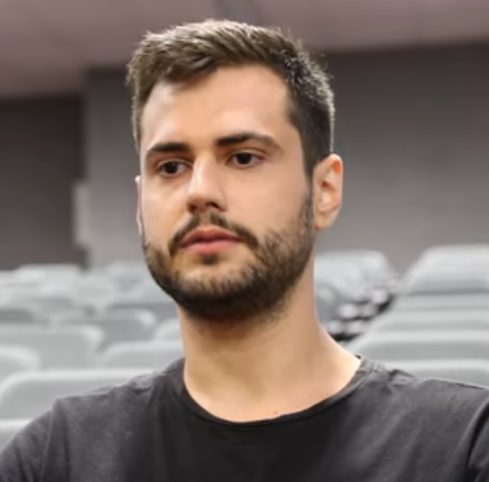
Chronus in 2018

On June 27, 2019 the MEC Social Communication Office emailed Chronus requesting the deletion of the article on Weintraub, stating that it contained "unverified information" that could lead to "ambiguous interpretations", justifying the request with the ministry's inability to edit the content; the office tried to edit the article themselves, but their edits were reverted. Chronus posted the email on the Portuguese Wikipedia forum on July 1, asking other editors for help on how to proceed. Chronus stated that he did not intend to respond to the ministry's email as communication should have been directed to the Wikimedia Foundation. Editors suggested that he request clarification. An hour after the e-mail was posted on the forum, an editor marked Weintraub's page as needing review. The event was covered by Estadão and led daily views on the page to increase from less than 200 on June 26 to over 23,000 on July 4.

Between July 1 and 4, 25 edits were made to Weintraub's article and, on its talk page, editors discussed how the budget cuts imposed by Weintraub should be described in the text. Editors worked on improving the article, but did not remove the controversial information. Following the event, Portuguese Wikipedia editors wrote a collective statement about how Wikipedia operates and commented on the MEC request to delete Weintraub's article, which was added to the page.

== August 13, 2019 email ==
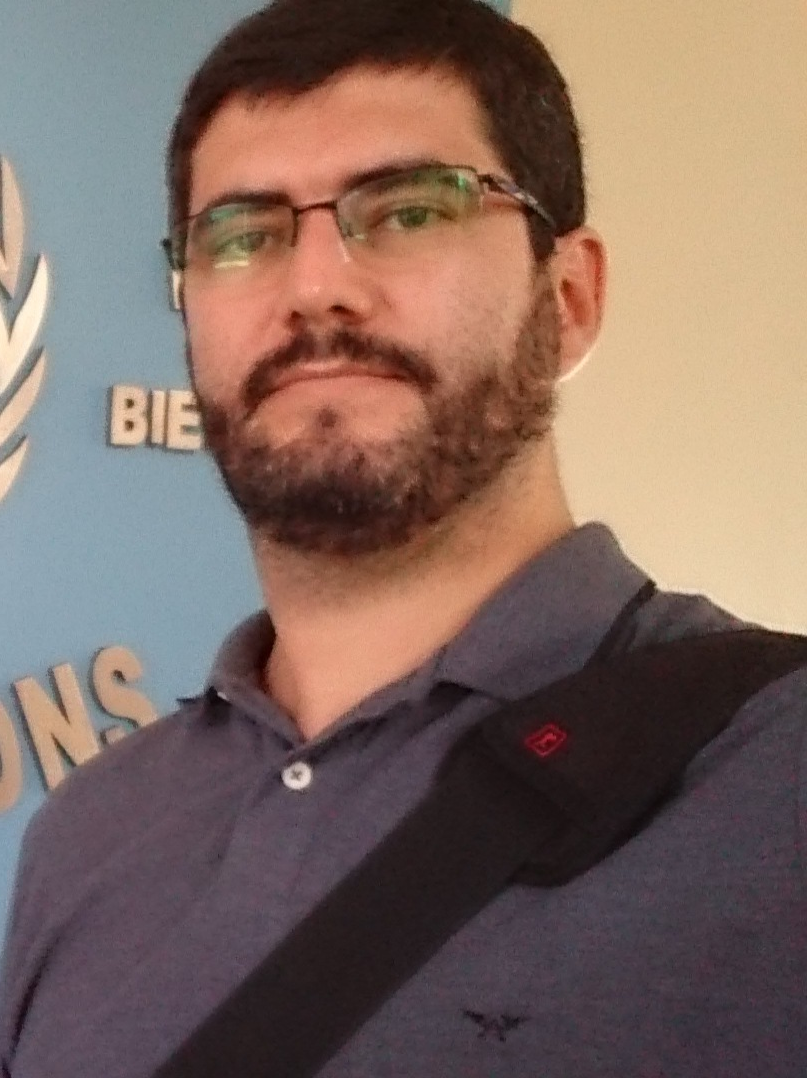
Padula in 2017

On August 13, 2019 MEC emailed Portuguese Wikipedia administrator Rodrigo Padula, requesting that the page be unlocked for editing by non-confirmed users, so that Weintraub could "exercise his right to a full defense and counterarguments", citing objections to how the article described his budget cuts, and threatened legal action if Wikipedia did not respond in five days.

Padula, who had previously contacted MEC offering to provide training on Wikipedia's dynamics for ministry employees, responded by explaining Wikipedia's rules and offering to explain the dynamics of the website to MEC.

Padula then removed protections on the page, reportedly not in response to the email, but because he felt they were no longer needed. However, after further vandalism, it was protected again. Padula saw the MEC threat as an attempt at censorship, and contacted the Wikimedia Foundation, who he said closely monitored the situation and offered legal advice in the event the matter was taken to court.

On September 4, Socialism and Liberty Party (PSOL) Federal Deputy Marcelo Freixo filed a formal request that Weintraub provide clarification on the use of ministry resources to further his personal interests on Wikipedia. In a speech on the floor of the Chamber of Deputies, Freixo said: "This is serious, it is not republican, and someone so shallow, with such petty initiatives, is unworthy of a position such as Minister of Education". (Note: This is a translation from the original quote in Portuguese: "Isso é grave, não é republicano e não está à altura de um cargo como ministro da Educação alguém tão raso, alguém com iniciativas tão pequenas.") Responding to Freixo's request, Weintraub confirmed that he had directed MEC staff to attempt to remove the article.

== Lawsuit ==
At an unspecified date, Weintraub sued the Wikimedia Foundation stating that his page contained "exclusively defamatory content", including the information that one of his former advisors had attempted to edit the article. In 2023, the 8th Civil Court of the Court of Justice of São Paulo (TJ-SP) ruled against Weintraub, finding that he had failed to prove that the content was false and did not specify what information was defamatory.

== See also ==
- List of political editing incidents on Wikipedia
- Streisand effect
