= International Club of National Unity =

Russian nonprofit organization

The International Club of National Unity (Russian: Международный клуб народного единства, abbreviated MKNE) is a Russian nonprofit organization established in Moscow in January 2025 to commit to "interaction with foreign journalists, bloggers and opinion leaders". According to the MKNE website the Club exists as a platform for public diplomacy intended to promote international cooperation and Russian culture through a focus on traditional spiritual and moral values.

The club organizes conferences and media programs featuring Russian political figures and foreign commentators. Activities have included a conference in Vitebsk concerning the cultural and information space of the Union State of Russia and Belarus, media events involving Western political commentators including Tucker Carlson, and a declaration concerning people whom the organization describes as political prisoners in Ukraine.

Investigative journalists have characterized the organization as a Russian disinformation and influence project supported by pro-Russian Ukrainian figures and foreign commentators.

== History and organization ==
The organization was registered in Moscow on January 23, 2025 under the full name Autonomous Noncommercial Organization "International Center for Strategic Development of Cultural, Historical and Interethnic Relations Club of National Unity". Its registered director is Igor Goncharenko. According to the organization website founders are Igor Goncharenko, Alexander Kazakov, Dmitry Veyalainen and Igor Belousov.

The club's website identifies its mission as strengthening international relations through public diplomacy, cultural activity and cooperation between civic organizations. Its stated objectives include establishing representatives in foreign countries and producing media. MKNE also conducts educational programs and claims to organize humanitarian activities. The club also has a mission of responding to what it regards as misinformation about Russia.

An investigation by the Ukrainian Center for Investigative Journalism described Goncharenko as a former general producer at Ukraine's state television broadcaster who later relocated to Russian-occupied Crimea. Previously, Goncharenko also headed a foundation supporting the rehabilitation of Russian military personnel. Members of his earlier organization and became associated with MKNE

The club initially identified Sergei Glazyev, Alexander Kazakov, Nikolai Azarov and State Duma member Yana Lantratova as co-chairs. Membership lists have also included Russian politicians, media personalities, military commentators and foreign political commentators. These commentators, such as Tucker Carlson, often have large followings in many countries

The Center for Investigative Journalism described the club as a project intended to advance Russian interests abroad through methods associated with soft power. The publication compared its planned international network with institutions such as Rossotrudnichestvo and the Russkiy Mir Foundation. Leadership of International Club of National Unity dispute claims of government control and assert they engage in independent public-diplomacy.

== Activities ==
=== Conferences ===
The club held its first conference in January 2025. Participants included members of the club's leadership, Russian public figures and foreign commentators known for spreading disinformation.

In July 2025, club representatives participated in an international conference in Vitebsk, Belarus, held in connection with the Slavianski Bazaar festival and the Days of the Union State. Belarusian broadcaster STV reported that the conference brought together political analysts, legislators, artists and bloggers from 14 countries.

According to the official program, the conference focused on shared cultural and information space between Russia and Belarus. The goal was increased cooperation between universities and youth education to create a common historical and cultural heritage online. Organizers said that a final resolution would be presented to the leaders of Russia and Belarus. Kazakov, identified by STV as a co-chair of the club, advocated a unified information, cultural and historical space.

=== Media programs ===
The organization produces filmed interviews, discussions and podcasts involving its members and invited commentators. Its programs have included projects hosted by Alexander Kazakov and Andrei Klintsevich and programs featuring American commentators Larry C. Johnson, Andrew Napolitano and convicted sex offender Scott Ritter. The Club published an Independent Supervisory Council of Media Experts which also includes Tucker Carlson, Ritter and Jeffrey Sachs.

In October 2025, the club participated in a Moscow media forum organized around appearances by Johnson. A closing press conference was held at the TASS press center.

=== Declaration concerning Ukraine ===
In 2025, the club published a declaration concerning people it described as political prisoners in Ukraine. The declaration was addressed to national governments, international organizations and religious leaders.

A version publicized in September 2025 contained 496 names. The club called for their release and rehabilitation. The authors also demanded the restoration of affected individuals' citizenship and legal rights. They concluded that an international mechanism was needed to investigate alleged arbitrary detention and mistreatment by Ukrainian authorities.

The list included former Ukrainian prime minister Nikolai Azarov, politician Viktor Medvedchuk, singer Taisia Povaliy and other political figures, activists, and journalists. The descriptions and political-prisoner designations were were not independently verified by any third party organization.

An examination by the independent Russian-language outlet Vot Tak questioned the declaration's numerical claims and methodology. It reported that the club continued soliciting names after announcing that the declaration had been submitted. Researchers examined the political and organizational affiliations of people associated with the initiative and found many people associated with the Russian government.

== Reception ==
The Center for Investigative Journalism described the club as part of a Russian propaganda and soft-power network. It highlighted the presence of Russian nationalist thinkers, sanctioned political figures, pro-Russian Ukrainian activists and foreign commentators who had previously appeared on Russian state or state aligned media.

Researchers and journalists compared the organization with the International Association of Friends of Crimea, a Russian supported organization established to promote international recognition of Russia's annexation of Crimea. The report noted that the organizations had some participants in common.

Russian and Belarusian media describe the organization in favorable terms. Moskovskij Komsomolets reported the claims in the club's declaration largely without challenging its underlying methodology, while STV presented the Vitebsk conference as an effort to strengthen cultural and information cooperation between Russia and Belarus.

== See also ==
- Public diplomacy
- Russkiy Mir Foundation
- Rossotrudnichestvo
- Russia–Belarus relations
- Russian disinformation
