= Online journalism in India =

Online journalism in India is a growing field shared between traditional media and the growing blogging community. Large media companies, traditionally print and television focused, continue to dominate the journalism environment now online but a growing group of dedicated bloggers are providing an independent voice.

== Growth ==
Although Indian newspapers were using computers for writing and page layout as early as 1987, they were slow to move to online editions of their papers. By 1998, only 48 papers had online editions. By 2006, the count had climbed to 116. This was despite the fact that in 2007 India had 42 million Internet users and was ranked fifth among online populations. The number of online news editions is seen as especially low because of the multitude of languages spoken in India. Of the 22 languages officially recognised, only 12 of the non-English languages were accounted for in a survey of online editions.

== Current environment ==
India's internet penetration is low – only 3.7%. Also, most websites are only available in English, which skews the viewership to only 10% of the population that is concentrated in urban centers. Conversely, India ranks third in number of Twitter users. LinkedIn offers a group that targets members that are online journalists in India with content, connections, and job opportunities unique to that segment. Popular discussions offer members an opportunity to share opportunities, discuss activities that affect the industry, and provide peer review for articles before publication on the internet. With the emergence of high speed data and faster mobile data services such as 4G and LTE, videos from some of India's best TV journalists have been made available online. Both NDTV and CNBC, two TV news reporting power houses in India, also have a strong online presence. The top five journalists in India all come from within the ranks of these stations. Another emerging favorite platform for journalists is Twitter. Journalists from all walks – Business, Political, Sports, and Religion - have come together to form a list for ease of following the person or topic that one might find interesting.

== Traditional media companies ==
The internet in India was not available to private users until 1995. By 1998, only 48 daily newspapers operated on the internet. By 2006 the number has steadily climbed to reach 116 newspapers and is predicted to grow as more people in India get access to the web. The first newspapers to adopt an online format were generally English speaking because they had more of a global audience. However, as more users gained access more Indian language papers began to surface. A lot of these new websites were generic versions of the daily paper and were not edited once published. They were operated by minimal staffing. In some instances a single editor would upload data to a third party pre-formatted interface which would allow stories to be published under general headings such as Local News, International, Sports, etc. A large majority of online newspapers in India don't receive advertisement revenue for their web editions and, with the exception of the major papers, most websites are being operated at a loss. Most publications have been slow to incorporate modern web features such as video clips or imbedded audio. One of the biggest concerns is economic viability due to lack of ad revenue. Indian journalism sites have also been slow to adopt the modern practice of online purchasing. This means that when someone visits the website they are unable to order the paper directly or purchase products through advertisements.

=== Criticism ===
Many online newspapers in India are criticised for being hastily thrown together with little care from publishers about content. A majority of websites lack simple features such as “about us” or feedback. While major publishers like the Times Group list email addresses of its writers and editors; many of the small daily newspapers only have a simple imbedded box on their website for feedback. This makes it difficult for readers to communicate with newspaper staff.

Online media with print products, such as OPEN magazine, have been instrumental in providing checks and balances on other forms of media. OPEN broke that Barkha Dutt, widely regarded as India's top journalist, was involved with the Radia tapes controversy, which very little of the print media discussed. Radia, a lobbyist, was involved in corruption regarding the use and sale of 2G wireless spectrum. Her attempt to rehabilitate her reputation was hampered by the combative style she tried to do it with.

=== Times of India group ===
The Times of India Group is the largest media conglomerate in India. Its flagship paper is the Times of India which is the largest English publication in the world by readership with just over 7.65 million daily readers. It is also the publisher of the largest business news paper in India, The Economic Times. The Times of India opened their web portal in 1999 and in 2003 they published an electronic version of their newspaper. Some Indian journalists, such as luminary M J Akbar, have made the leap into online journalism. Akbar has been working in journalism since he joined the Times of India in 1971 and currently heads the Sunday Guardian as the editorial director of India Today Group and Headlines Today. The Sunday Guardian is notable for having made a successful pivot from being a print only paper to one which includes online content in their media portfolios. Today, M J Akbar is just one example of a growing number of journalists who have embraced online media while maintaining a strong presence in the print media market.

=== Dainik Jagran ===
Dainik Jagran has been India's most read newspaper for 23 consecutive years with a daily readership of over 16 million. It's the flagship publication of Jagran Prakashan Ltd (JPL), a large media conglomerate in India. JPL launched MMI online in 2008 to handle all of its digital offerings. Most notable is jagran.com which has recently aligned with yahoo.com to bring a large range of offerings to its visitors. The website can see up to 50 updates in one day. In 2011, INEXT was re-launched along with the website inextlive.com. This website launched by Dinesh Shrinet. INEXT is the first bilingual daily news published in India. It currently publishes content from at least 9 different major cities. Besides managing content MMI Online is also actively looking for gaps in the web offerings so that it can bring new content to the country. MMI online also is working to transition India into web 3.0.

=== One India ===
Oneindia.in (owned by Greynium Information Technologies Pvt. Ltd) is an Indian Internet portal – delivering content, community and commerce to Indian consumers, businesses and the global Indian community. As of 2008, Oneindia.in has been serving the Internet audience for the last 8 years (the language portals have been live since April 2000). It is a multilingual website in all South India languages and English. This online media house was founded by B.G. Mahesh. One India launched its Hindi portal in 2007. Dinesh Shrinet was the editor of this website. “Hindi is the second most popular Indian language on the Internet and increasingly new Internet users are from non-metros and smaller towns,” said B.G. Mahesh, CEO, Greynium Information Technologies Pvt Ltd, “hence it is essential that these audiences are given the right platform to explore and use the Internet to its fullest potential,” added Mahesh.

== Blogging in India ==
The largest news and media companies now include blogs in their online offerings. Sites such as The Times Of India have a blog section as does The Economic Times. American online publications are also offering blogs to the Indian market. The Wall Street Journal blog India Realtime is staffed by journalists exclusively from New Delhi and Mumbai and focuses on analysis of issues occurring in India. In September 2010, The Wall Street Journal expanded its offering to include the India Realtime blog in Hindi in addition to the English language. Dainik Jagran, India's most read newspaper, also runs a site dedicated to blogs.

== See also ==
- Fake news in India
