= InfoRos =

- Website type: News agency Online media network
- Available in: Russian, English, French
- Owner: Denis Tyurin (sanctioned)
- Website: inforos.org
- Commercial: No
- Registration: None
- Launched: 2003
- Current status: Active

InfoRos (Russian: Инфорос) is a Russian news agency and online media network that has been described by Western governments and independent researchers as part of a pro-Kremlin disinformation ecosystem. Investigations and sanctions actions have linked InfoRos to Russian military intelligence influence operations and the use of proxy websites to disseminate propaganda and misleading narratives.

== Background ==
During the Cold War era Soviet Union was known to deploy disinformation as a form of active measures. These methods relied on not shaping the information space but polluting it with falsehoods to the point that truth becomes relative and usable to media in adversary nations.

After the fall of the Soviet Union, and then especially after the 2008 invasion of Georgia dominance of the information space became military doctrine for the Russian Federation.

== History ==
InfoRos was founded in 2003 and registered in Moscow as a news agency and incorporated in 2004. The first domains The first domains registered to speak of Russians in Ukraine were registered in the summer of 2008.The website promoted trips to russia and decried the Orange Revolution, Stepan Bandera, and attacked the Orthodox Church in Ukraine because of calls for autonomy from the Moscow Patriarchate. InfoRps was connected by researchers to GRU’s military unit 54777.

In 2010 InfoRos added a third cluster of websites to promote Ukrainian neutrality. InfoRos also promoted events with the Russian Diaspora Institute. After the 2014 Maidan Protests that lead to the Revolution of Dignity InfoRos added another cluster of websites to discredit the Maidan protesters.

== COVID-19 disinformation ==
During the COVID-19 pandemic, InfoRos was reported to have participated in campaigns spreading misleading narratives about the virus and public health responses. U.S. officials and researchers identified InfoRos sites as part of a Russian effort to distribute pandemic-related disinformation internationally.

U.S. intelligence assessments connected InfoRos-linked outlets to efforts that sought to amplify narratives undermining trust in Western governments and public health institutions during the pandemic. During May and July 2020 InfoRos published over 150 websites with misleading pandemic information.

== Sanctions ==
In 2021, the U.S. Department of the Treasury sanctioned InfoRos in connection with foreign influence operations. Treasury stated that InfoRos was involved in Russian government-directed disinformation efforts aboutCOVID-19 and U.S. elections.

The U.S. Department of State’s Rewards for Justice program later offered a reward for information on InfoRos, describing it as part of GRU-directed influence operations.

== See also ==
- GRU Unit 54777
- SouthFront
- List of political disinformation website campaigns in Russia
