= Asian News International =

Indian news agency

- Type: News agency
- Industry: Media, news media
- Founded: 9 December 1971; 54 years ago
- Founder: Prem Prakash
- Headquarters: New Delhi
- Area served: India, South Asia
- Key people: Sanjiv Prakash (CEO); Prem Prakash (chairman); Smita Prakash(editor-in-chief)
- Owner: ANI Media Private Limited
- Website: aninews.in

Asian News International (ANI) is an Indian news agency that offers syndicated multimedia news feeds to news bureaus in India. The company was established by Prem Prakash in 1971 and, under the name TVNF, soon became the first agency in India to syndicate video news. Drawing upon connections within the Indian government, ANI expanded greatly during the early 2000s. After a period of downturn, the company regained its monopolistic position; as of 2019, it is India's largest television news agency, and as of 2024, the largest newswire service.

Long-form investigations by The Caravan and The Ken have described ANI as having been closely associated with the government of India for decades, including under Congress Party rule, but especially after the 2014 election of the Bharatiya Janata Party (BJP). In 2019, The Caravan reported that ANI "has a disturbing history of producing blatant propaganda for the state".

An EU DisinfoLab investigation in an extensive report found ANI to be amplifying a vast network of fake news websites spreading pro-government, anti-Pakistan, and anti-China propaganda, and in a later investigation to quote associated sources that do not exist.

== History ==
=== Establishment and early years (1971–2000) ===
Prem Prakash started his career in the field of photography, working for Visnews (and Reuters) as a photojournalist, where he covered some of the most significant historical events in post-independence India. A significant figure in the domain of news and documentary film-making by the 1970s, he commanded considerable respect among foreign journalists and film-makers, and received the MBE. In 1971, Prem established ANI (initially TVNF, India's first television news feature agency), which gained influence within the Congress Government. TVNF played a key role in fulfilling Indira Gandhi's wish to showcase a positive image of India. It produced numerous films for Doordarshan and gained a monopoly in the sector.

Smita Prakash, an alumna of the Indian Institute of Mass Communication, joined ANI in 1986 as an intern and later became a full-time employee. The daughter of Inna Ramamohan Rao, former director of the Ministry of Information and Broadcasting married Prem's son Sanjiv in 1988, which furthered ANI's access within the government. In 1993, Reuters purchased a stake in ANI, and it was allowed to exert a complete monopoly over their India feed.

=== Expansion (2000–present) ===
By 2000, India saw a boom of private 24/7 news channels, but unsustainable revenue models meant that they lacked the capacity to hire video-reporters across the country. This allowed a massive expansion of ANI's domestic video-production capacities at the behest of Sanjiv, who rose through the ranks. Smita also rose through the ranks with him. Asian Films TV was incorporated in 2000 to provide feed for newspapers and periodicals. The Caravan notes that most of its foot-soldiers were low-cost recruits, who had little to do with journalism.

In 2000, the NDA government launched DD Kashir, a Kashmir-based regional channel, and ANI was allowed to produce its programs. By the end of 2005, ANI's business-model was faring impressively on a consistent basis and it shifted its office out of Gole Market, to a new five-storey building in R. K. Puram. ANI continued to be trusted by the upcoming UPA governments, to the extent that the Ministry of External Affairs chose Smita to be a part of the two-member contingent of Indian journalists at both of the joint press conferences between the incumbent prime ministers of India and the United States.

In the later 2000s, the increasing charges for ANI feed and low quality of its journalism, coupled with the introduction of broadcast vans, led several national and regional channels to unsubscribe from ANI. The launch of UNI TV in 2010 by Yashwant Deshmukh gave stiff competition as well. But Ishaan Prakash, Smita's son, who joined the company in 2011, procured multiple units of LiveU, expanded ANI's overseas bureaus and signed contracts with multiple state governments and union ministries. A monopoly was again re-created and most of its competitors eventually shut down. By late 2011, ANI accounted for about 99% of the Reuters feed from India, and in FY 2017–18, it was paid ₹2.54 crore for the services. Archive videos were sold at rates as high as ₹1,000 (equivalent to ₹1,500 or US$16 in 2026) per second; in FY 2017–18, the firm reported revenues of ₹68.23 crore (equivalent to ₹104 crore or US$11 million in 2026) and a net profit of ₹9.91 crore (equivalent to ₹15 crore or US$1.6 million in 2026).

Under new management, ANI has been accused of practising an aggressive model of journalism focused on maximum revenue output where journalists were considered dispensable. Multiple employees have accused ANI of having no human resource management system and ill-treatment of ex-employees.

== Litigation ==
=== Copyright infringement ===
In July 2024, ANI sued Press Trust of India over copyright infringement alleging that it had plagiarised ANI's video clips of Spicejet aircraft's AC breakdown, and sought ₹2 crore (equivalent to ₹2.1 crore or US$220,000 in 2026) in damages.

In September 2024, ANI sued Netflix over the web series IC 814: The Kandahar Hijack for copyright infringement, alleging that the latter had used video clips in its Kandahar Hijack series without ANI's permission.

==== YouTube ====
In May 2025, The Reporters Collective published an investigation into ANI's copyright claims against YouTube creators who use its content without permission. ANI reportedly demands around ₹15 lakh (equivalent to ₹15 lakh or US$16,000 in 2026) lakh to ₹25 lakh (equivalent to ₹26 lakh or US$27,000 in 2026) and sometimes up to ₹40 lakh (equivalent to ₹41 lakh or US$43,000 in 2026) from YouTubers for retrospective licenses to its content, with The Reporters Collective stating that ANI enforces its copyright on YouTube much more heavily than other Indian media organisations, with some clips deemed infringing by ANI being under 10 seconds in length. Critics have argued that ANI's leverage over YouTubers is enhanced by YouTube's policy of automatically terminating channels after 3 copyright strikes in a 90-day period, often giving creators little choice but to pay what ANI demands if it files copyright claims over their content.

ANI has argued that it is legally entitled to enforce its copyright and it is "not extortion" to do so. Later that month, ANI sued YouTuber Mohak Mangal for defamation, after he accused ANI of "extortion and blackmail" after they demanded ₹40 lakh (equivalent to ₹41 lakh or US$43,000 in 2026) to remove copyright strikes due to his use of short clips of their content.

==== OpenAI ====
In November 2024, Asian News International sued OpenAI for allegedly reusing the former's content for model training, as well as allegedly creating false stories attributed to the agency. ANI also sought ₹2 crore (equivalent to ₹2.1 crore or US$220,000 in 2026) in damages. The lawsuit alleged that while some of ANI's content was publicly accessible, certain news items and reports were only available to subscribers, and OpenAI had no right to use this material without a license. ANI also claimed that ChatGPT had produced responses attributing false interviews to the agency, including an interview with Rahul Gandhi that never took place. OpenAI defended its practices, stating that its actions were legal and transparent, and argued that it had not accessed any subscription-only content. The company also raised questions about territorial jurisdiction, noting that it had no physical presence in India.

In October 2024, before the lawsuit was filed, OpenAI had blocked ANI through its opt-out policy, which allows websites to opt out of automated use of their text by web scrapers. However, ANI argued this was ineffective as their content was still accessible through third-party content syndication. The case raised questions about India's approach to AI and copyright law, as the country's fair use provisions did not directly reference AI training models. OpenAI defended against claims of verbatim reproduction by arguing that copyright protects expression rather than ideas or facts, and that its models sufficiently modified the original expression to claim copyright exceptions. The Delhi High Court heard the case first on 19 November 2024, and then again on 28 January 2025.

=== Wikimedia Foundation ===
In July 2024, ANI filed a lawsuit against the Wikimedia Foundation in the Delhi High Court—claiming to have been defamed in the Wikipedia article about the agency—and sought ₹2 crore (equivalent to ₹2.1 crore or US$220,000 in 2026) in damages. At the time of the suit's filing, the Wikipedia article about ANI said the news agency had "been accused of having served as a propaganda tool for the incumbent central government, distributing materials from a vast network of fake news websites, and misreporting events on multiple occasions". The filing accused Wikipedia of publishing "false and defamatory content with the malicious intent of tarnishing the news agency's reputation, and aimed to discredit its goodwill".

From 5 September to 8 April, a series of hearings were held. An arrangement was reached in the High Court on 11 November to have the foundation serving the summons papers to the involved users as an intermediary while disclosing the email identities of the users under sealed cover to the judge, which would still protect the privacy of the individuals for the time being. After the non-appearance of the individual editors and after deliberations by the judge, the court ordered the Wikimedia Foundation to remove the allegedly defamatory content, remove the article's protected status, and "restrain the platform's users and administrators from publishing anything defamatory against the news agency". However, this order was set aside after WMF appealed to the Supreme Court, and as of 9 May a fresh application for the interim relief was being heard by another judge, Justice Jyoti Singh in the High Court.

Separately, on 21 October 2024, the Wikimedia Foundation suspended access to the article about the ongoing court case, Asian News International vs. Wikimedia Foundation, due to an order from the high court, which is likely the first time an English Wikipedia page had been taken down after a court order. This order was questioned on 17 March 2025 by a two-judge bench consisting of A. S. Oka and Ujjal Bhuyan of the Supreme Court, stating that judges and courts should be more tolerant of criticism; requiring the removal of content because of criticism may not be correct. The judges also said the order was about press freedom broadly. On 9 May, the order was overturned and the article reinstated.

== Controversies ==
=== Relationship with the Indian government and allegations of bias ===
A 2019 long-form report in The Caravan described ANI as having "a disturbing history of producing blatant propaganda for the state". According to The Caravan, for decades under Congress rule, ANI effectively served as the external publicity division of the Ministry of External Affairs, showing the army in a positive light and suppressing news about any internal discontent; the private nature of the organisation and the repute of its founder gave an air of nonpartisan legitimacy to their videos. During the peak spans of militancy in the Kashmir conflict, ANI was the near-sole purveyor of video-footage, especially with Rao having been recruited as the media advisor to the state. ANI grew even closer to the government after the Bharatiya Janata Party (BJP) was elected to power in 2014; effects have ranged from sympathetic covering of the political campaigns by the BJP to reporters being highly confrontational when dealing with politicians from opposition parties. ANI journalists are generally the only members of non-state media organisations to accompany Modi on foreign trips. According to an investigation by Newslaundry, ANI was involved in contract negotiations with the chief ministers of several states for a "PR package" to provide coverage by ANI in exchange for payment.

A 2019 Association for Computing Machinery conference paper that analysed the Twitter activity of BJP members of parliament identified that "the highest levels of engagement are with those [accounts] known to be pro-ruling party—ie the party media mouthpiece (BJP Live), the two national news outlets—Doordarshan and All India Radio, and the ruling party-aligned Asian News International (ANI)".

According to Newslaundry, ANI consistently reveals the religion of Muslims accused of crimes, while generally omitting this information if the accused is Hindu. After the enactment of the Citizenship (Amendment) Act, 2019, an Alt News report showed that among protests outside India in response to the legislation, ANI's coverage only included protests in support of the legislation while excluding protests that opposed it.

=== Srivastava Group ===
In 2020, an investigation by EU DisinfoLab concluded that ANI was publishing pro-Modi government disinformation with opinion pieces and news content, including opinion pieces falsely attributed to European politicians, and that they were sourcing material from a vast network of fake news websites run by the "Srivastava Group". The report also concluded that they had spread anti-Pakistan and sometimes anti-China disinformation with the primary aim of this fake news coverage being to "discredit Pakistan" in international forums. The report noted that mainstream Indian news media regularly relies on content provided by ANI, and that ANI had on several occasions provided legitimacy and coverage to the entire "influence operation" run by the fake news network, which relied "more on ANI than on any other distribution channel" [to give it] "both credibility and a wide reach to its content". ANI is also believed to have gained access to India's intelligence establishment in recent years; in foreign affairs many of its videos depicted protests by fringe lobby groups and activists as if they were large-scale and mainstream.

A later investigation by EU DisinfoLab in 2023 found that ANI had consistently quoted think tanks and experts associated with the Srivastava Group that did not appear to actually exist.

=== Misinformation ===
Fact checkers certified by the Poynter Institute's International Fact-Checking Network have accused ANI of misreporting events. The Caravan found several pieces of video footage from ANI, wherein logos of random television channels from Pakistan, along with Urdu tickers, were superimposed on news showcasing India in a positive light; their video editors have admitted to forging clips.

In July 2021, ANI falsely reported that Chinese weightlifter Hou Zhihui, who won the gold medal in the women's 49 kg weightlifting at the 2020 Summer Olympics in Tokyo, would be tested by the International Testing Agency (ITA) for doping, according to ANI's unnamed source. The article also stated that Indian weightlifter Mirabai Chanu, who won silver medal in the same event, would be upgraded to a gold medal if the tests were positive. The World Anti-Doping Agency (WADA) and ITA debunked the reports, saying they knew nothing of such tests being carried out and that any developments would be transparently reported on their website.

In April 2023, ANI falsely reported a photo of a padlocked grave in Hyderabad, India, as being from Pakistan, claiming it was locked to prevent necrophilia. Fact-checking revealed that the grave was actually secured to prevent unauthorised burials and to protect it from being trampled. In July 2023, ANI falsely blamed Muslims for the sexual assault and rape of two Kuki women during the 2023 Manipur violence. ANI later apologised for the mistake, blaming erroneous reading of tweets posted by the Manipur police.

In August 2024, ANI disseminated misinformation regarding attacks on Hindus in Bangladesh. The controversy erupted after ANI shared a video on social media, which falsely claimed that a man who was seeking justice for his missing son was a Hindu—he was Muslim. The video, initially shared by ANI, was quickly picked up by right-wing accounts and other media outlets that rely on ANI's feed, further spreading the false narrative. Though ANI deleted the video after being called out for the misleading content, the misinformation continued to circulate on various social media platforms, including Facebook, Instagram, and WhatsApp, perpetuating the false narrative.

== See also ==
- United News of India, multilingual news agency in India
