= The Ken =

Indian business news website

- Founded: 2016
- Founders: Rohin Dharmakumar, Seema Singh, Sumanth Raghavendra and Ashish Mishra
- Headquarters: Bengaluru, India, India
- Website: the-ken.com

The Ken is an Indian business news website based out of Bangalore, India. It was launched in 2016 as a premium subscriber-only platform that publishes one article per day. Its founders include Rohin Dharmakumar, Seema Singh, Sumanth Raghavendra and Ashish Mishra. PayTM founder Vijay Shekhar Sharma is an investor.

As of September 2021, it had over 30,000 individual subscribers and over 150 corporate subscribers.

== History and funding ==
The Ken was launched by Rohin Dharmakumar, Seema Singh, Sumanth Raghavendra and Ashish Mishra in 2016 as a premium subscriber only platform.

Till 2018, the website raised ₹4.46 crore (US$460,000) and in 2018, it raised ₹10.32 crore (US$1.1 million) from several investors including the Omidyar Network. It later said it had raised a further $1.9 million between the two rounds. In August 2023, it closed a ₹16 crore ($2 million) Series B round of funding from two new investors, Rainmatter Capital and Baskar Subramanian, in a mixed round consisting of primary and secondary investments by both.

== Controversies and lawsuits ==
From 2019 to 2022, The Ken and another business news website, The Morning Context, were involved in lawsuits against one another. In 2019, Ashish Mishra left The Ken and started a rival online publication called The Morning Context. The Ken then filed a lawsuit against Mishra alleging unauthorised use of confidential information which it alleged was used to "set up and operate" The Morning Context . Following this The Morning Context filed a defamation suit against The Ken alleging “false, derogatory & slanderous public statements amounting to defamation”. The Ken responded to the notice by "categorically rejecting" the claims made in it. Later, The Ken withdrew its lawsuit against The Morning Context, Ashish Mishra and others on 24 May 2022.

== Content ==
The Ken publishes articles that focus on Indian business, healthcare and other similar topics. In 2019, The Ken expanded to Southeast Asia by launching a Southeast Asia Edition which is also run as subscriber-only platform that publishes one article per day. In 2021, The Ken started a "business newsletter bundle" named “The Stack” that publishes newsletters that focus on specific sectors like Climate Technology, Financial Technology and Personal Finance among others. Additionally, in 2021 the Ken also started its first podcast, "Unofficial Sources" (since discontinued), which was followed by two more podcasts: "First Principles" and "Cost to Company". In late 2022, The Ken launched its third podcast "Daybreak" that aimed to provide business news in less than 15 minutes.

== See also ==
- Online journalism in India
